= Nanjing Dinghuaimen Yangtze River Tunnel =

Road tunnel under the Yangtze River in Nanjing, China

Nanjing Dinghuaimen Yangtze River Tunnel 南京定淮门长江隧道
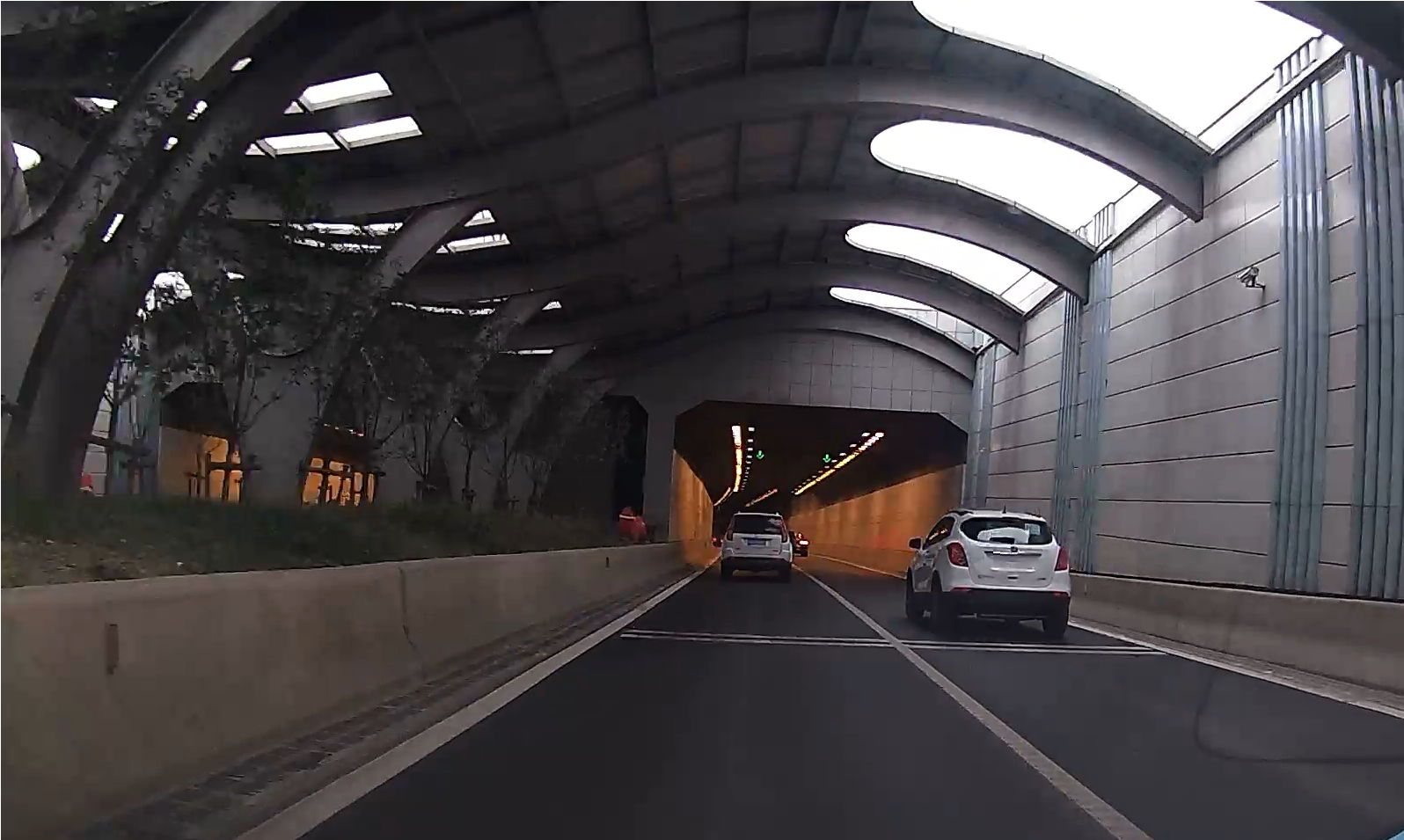
- Entrance to the tunnel
- Interactive map of Nanjing Dinghuaimen Yangtze River Tunnel 南京定淮门长江隧道

Overview
- Location: Nanjing, Jiangsu - under the Yangtze River
- Coordinates: 32°4′49.8″N 118°42′41.4″E
- Start: Gulou District
- End: Jiangbei New District

Operation
- Constructed: 2010 - 2016
- Opened: January 1, 2016

Technical
- Length: 7,360 metres (24,150 ft) (south route); 7,340 metres (24,080 ft) (north route)

The Nanjing Dinghuaimen Yangtze River Tunnel, formerly Nanjing Yangzijiang Tunnel, is a set of two tunnels under the Yangtze River in Nanjing, China. The tunnel connects the Gulou District to Jiangbei New District in the city of Nanjing. Construction of the tunnels began in 2010. The tunnel broke through in 2015 and was opened on 1 January 2016. The tunnel was renamed on 20 December 2019.

== See also ==
- Yangtze River bridges and tunnels
