= Shiban'gou Yangtze River Bridge =

Fuling Shibangou Yangtze River Bridge 涪陵石板沟长江大桥
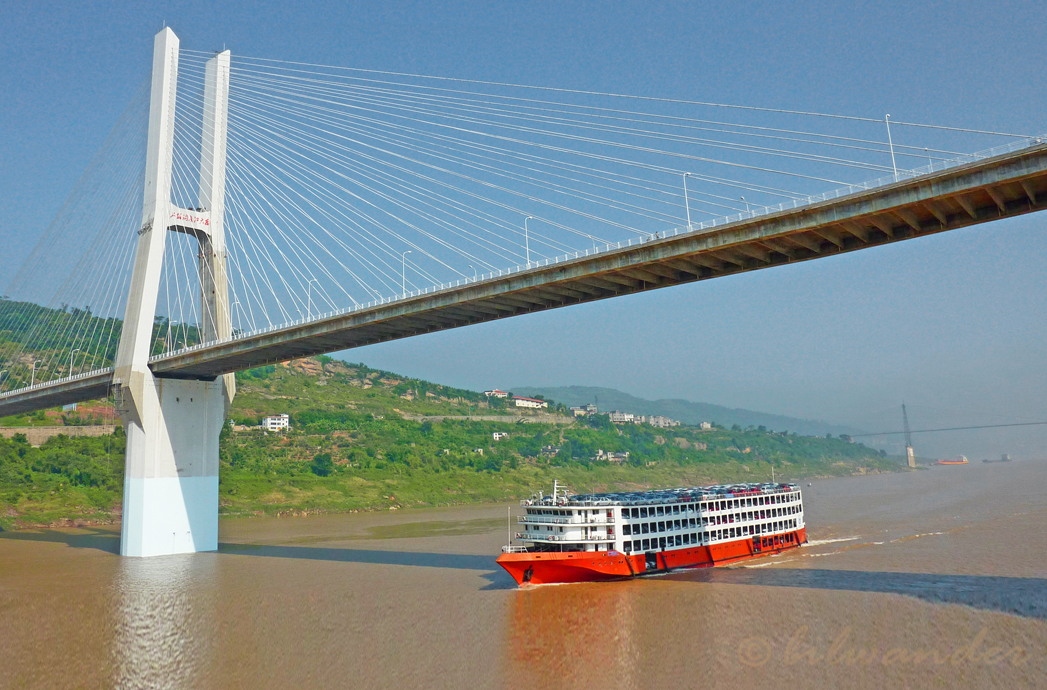
- Coordinates: 29.730694°N 107.405944°E
- Crosses: Yangtze River
- Locale: Fuling District, Chongqing, China

Characteristics
- Design: Cable-stayed
- Material: Steel/concrete
- Total length: 975 metres (3,199 ft)
- Longest span: 450 metres (1,480 ft)

History
- Construction end: 2009

Location
- Interactive map of Fuling Shibangou Yangtze River Bridge

The Fuling Shibangou Yangtze River Bridge is a cable-stayed bridge over the Yangtze River in Fuling District, Chongqing, China. Completed in 2009, it has a main span of 450 metres (1,480 ft) placing it among the longest cable-stayed bridges in the world.

== See also ==
- List of largest cable-stayed bridges
- Yangtze River bridges and tunnels
