= Wuxue Yangtze River Bridge =

Cable-stayed bridge, China

Wuxue Yangtze River Bridge 武穴长江大桥
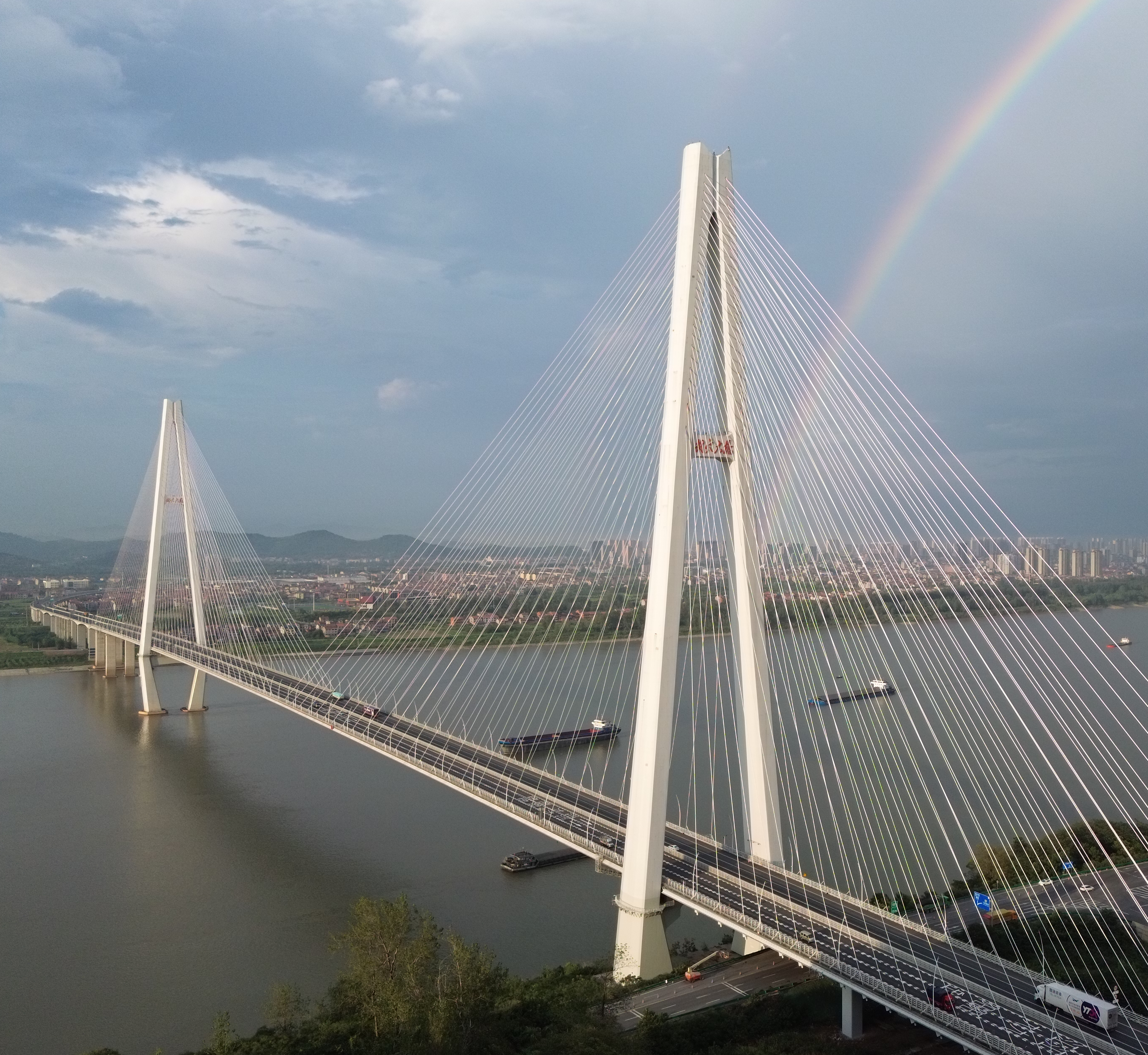
- Coordinates: 29°50′30″N 115°30′07″E
- Carries: Hubei S29
- Crosses: Yangtze River
- Locale: Wuxue–Yangxin County, Hubei, China

Characteristics
- Design: Cable-stayed
- Material: Steel, concrete
- Width: 38.5 m (126 ft)
- Height: 275 m (902 ft) (north tower); 215 m (705 ft) (south tower)
- Longest span: 808 m (2,651 ft)

History
- Inaugurated: 25 September 2021

Location
- Interactive map of Wuxue Yangtze River Bridge

The Wuxue Yangtze River Bridge (Chinese: 武穴长江大桥) is a cable-stayed bridge in Wuxue, Hubei province.

When it opened, it is one of the longest cable-stayed bridge with a 808 metres (2,651 ft) main spans.

== See also ==
- Bridges and tunnels across the Yangtze River
- List of bridges in China
- List of longest cable-stayed bridge spans
- List of tallest bridges in the world
