= Lidu Yangtze River Bridge =

Lidu Bridge 涪陵李渡长江大桥
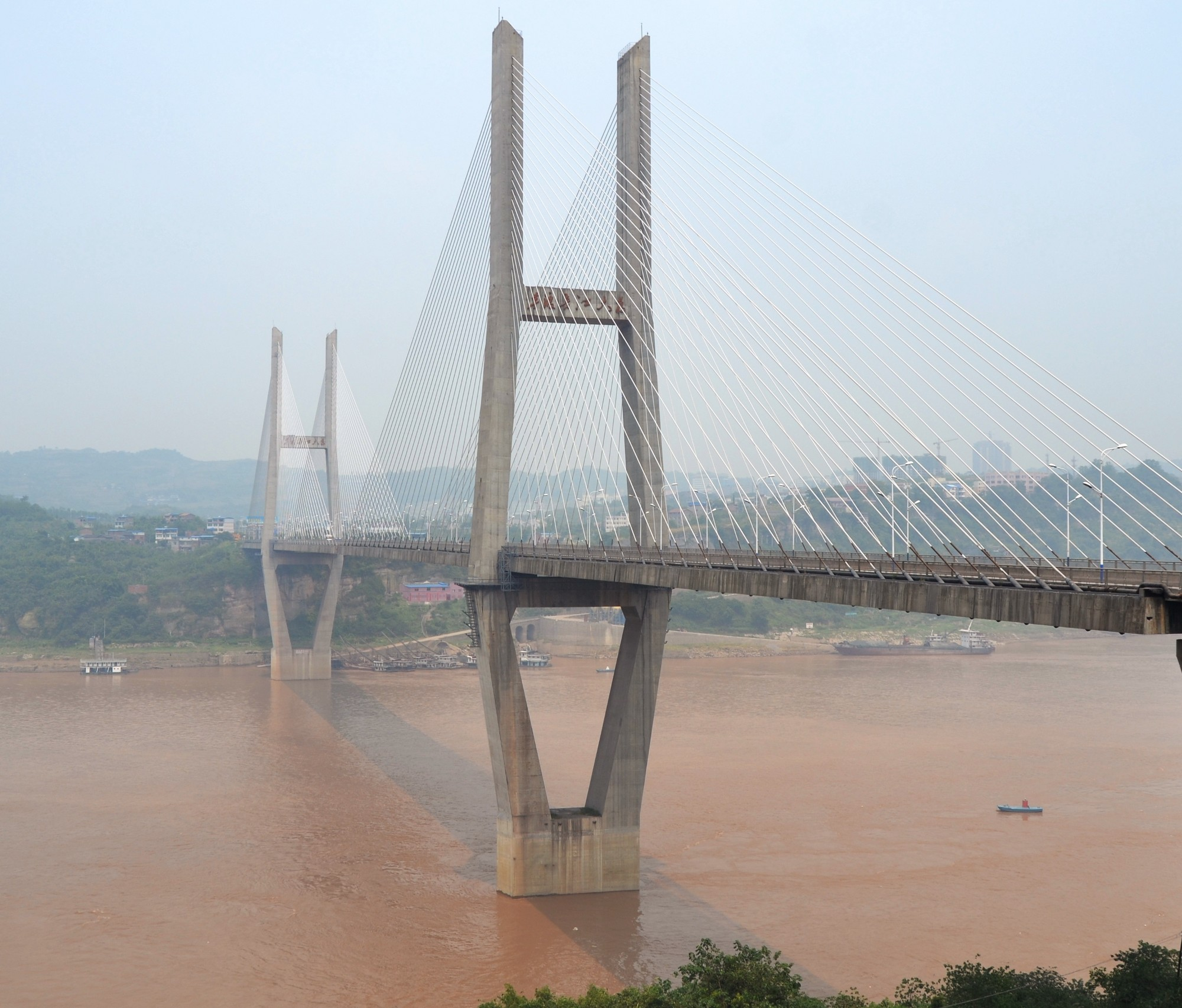
- Coordinates: 29.727028°N 107.293472°E
- Crosses: Yangtze River
- Locale: Fuling, Chongqing, China

Characteristics
- Design: Cable-stayed
- Material: Steel/concrete
- Total length: 822 metres (2,697 ft)
- Width: 25.1 metres (82 ft)
- Height: 173 metres (568 ft)
- Longest span: 392 metres (1,286 ft)

History
- Constructed by: CCCC Fourth Harbor Engineering Co., Ltd
- Construction end: 20 October 2007
- Construction cost: ¥350 million
- Opened: 27 October 2007

Location
- Interactive map of Lidu Bridge

The Lidu Bridge is a cable-stayed bridge which crosses the Yangtze River in the Fuling District of Chongqing, China. Completed in 2007, the bridge cost ¥350 million and has a main span of 398 metres (1,306 ft).

== See also ==
- Yangtze River bridges and tunnels
