= Fuling Yangtze River Bridge =

Fuling Yangtze River Bridge 涪陵长江大桥
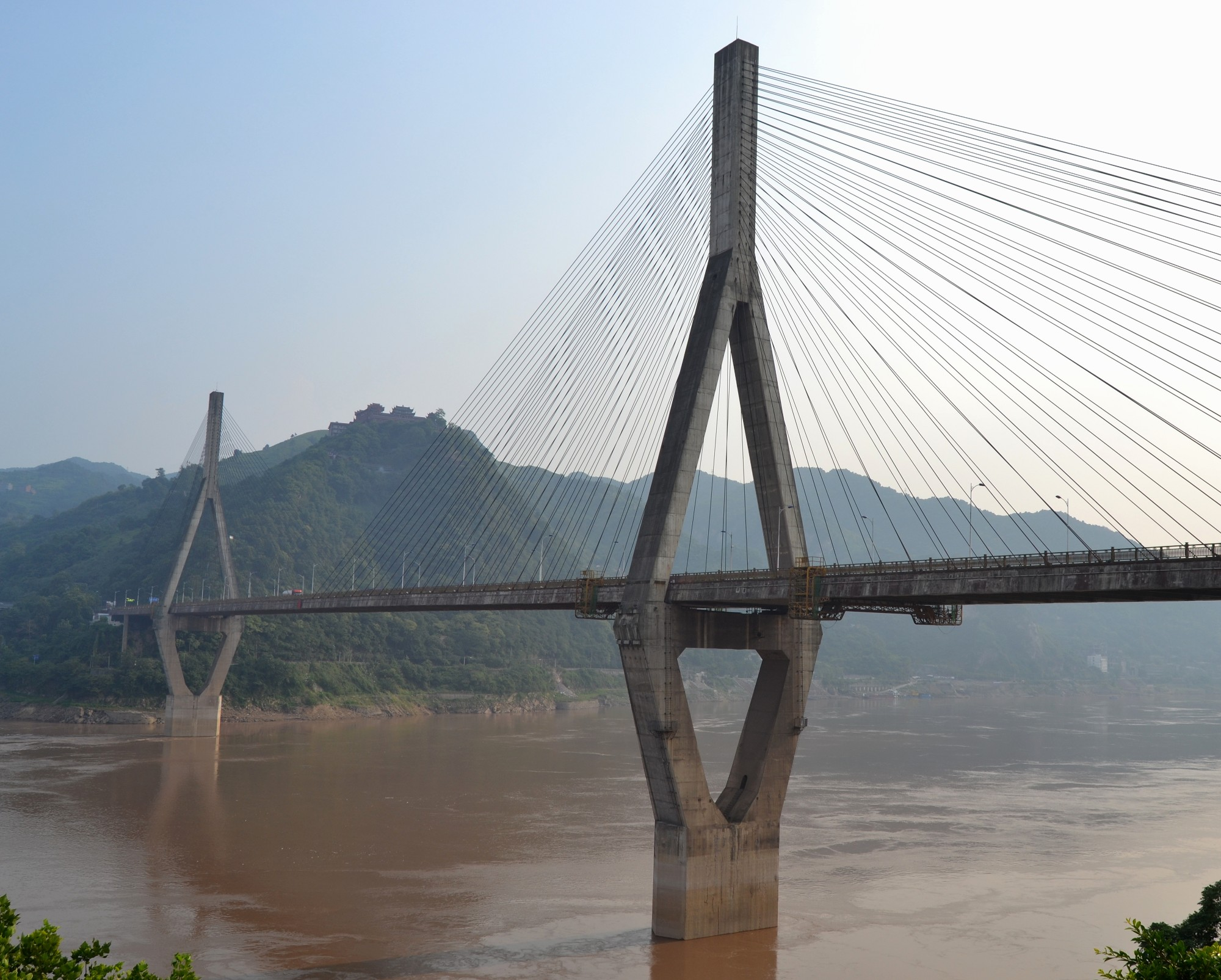
- Coordinates: 29.7365°N 107.346806°E
- Carries: China National Highway 319
- Crosses: Yangtze River
- Locale: Fuling, Chongqing, China

Characteristics
- Design: Cable-stayed
- Material: Steel/concrete
- Total length: 631 metres (2,070 ft)
- Longest span: 330 metres (1,080 ft)

History
- Construction end: 1997

Location
- Interactive map of Fuling Yangtze River Bridge

The Fuling Yangtze River Bridge is a cable-stayed bridge over the Yangtze River in Fuling District of Chongqing, China. Completed in 1997, it was the first bridge over the Yangtze in the Fuling district. The bridge carries four lanes of the China National Highway 319 and is 631 metres (2,070 ft) long including a main span of 330 metres (1,080 ft).

== See also ==
- Yangtze River bridges and tunnels
