= Zigui Yangtze River Bridge =

Zigui Yangtze River Bridge 秭归长江大桥
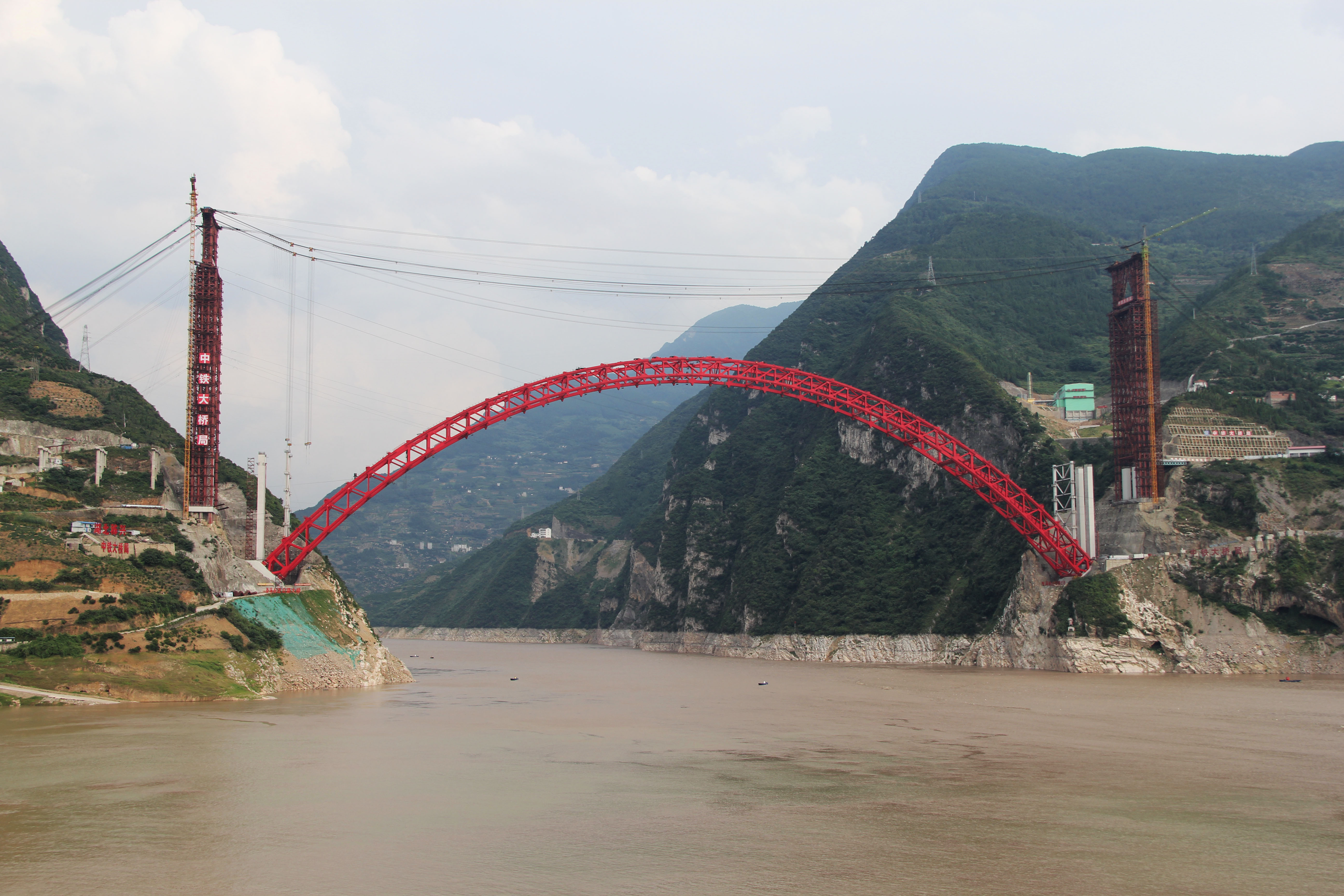
- Coordinates: 30°57′34″N 110°45′33″E
- Carries: Xingshan to Wufeng Expressway
- Crosses: Yangtze River
- Locale: Zigui County, Hubei, China

Characteristics
- Design: Half-through steel box truss arch bridge
- Material: Steel, concrete
- Total length: 883.2 m (2,898 ft)
- Longest span: 519 m (1,703 ft)
- Clearance below: 118 m (387 ft) (to full reservoir); 233 m (764 ft) (to original level of the Yangtze river)

History
- Construction start: 28 August 2015
- Opened: 27 September 2019

Location
- Interactive map of Zigui Yangtze River Bridge

The Zigui Yangtze River Bridge (Chinese: 秭归长江大桥) is an expressway bridge over the Yangtze River in Zigui County, Hubei, China. It was one of the longest arch bridge in the world when opened with a span of 519 m (1,703 ft). This is the nearest bridge upstream from the Three Gorges Dam.

== See also ==
- Bridges and tunnels across the Yangtze River
- List of bridges in China
- List of longest arch bridge spans
