= Wuhan Yangtze River Tunnel =

Road tunnel in Wuhan, China

Wuhan Yangtze River Tunnel 武汉长江隧道
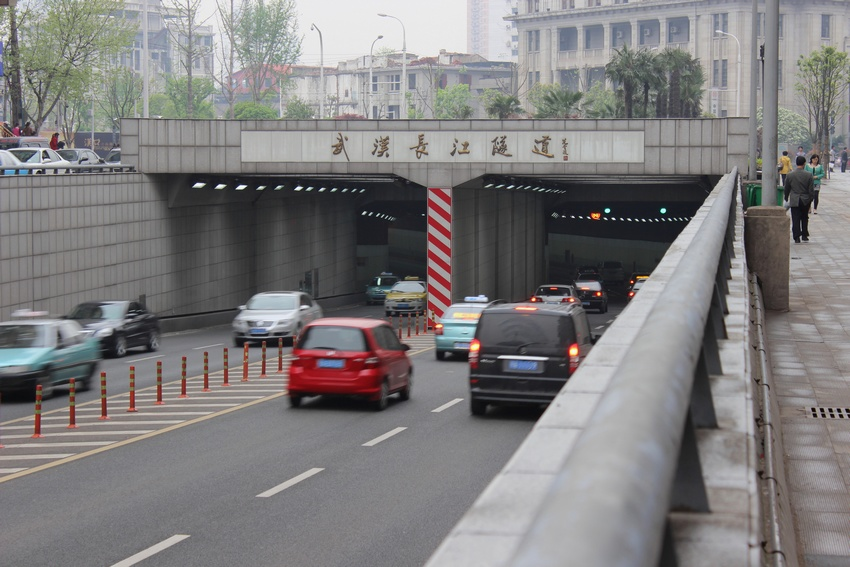
- Entrance to the tunnel
- Interactive map of Wuhan Yangtze River Tunnel 武汉长江隧道

Overview
- Location: Wuhan, Hubei - under the Yangtze River
- Coordinates: 30°34′45″N 114°18′26″E
- Start: Wuchang District
- End: Jianghan District

Operation
- Constructed: 2004 - 2008
- Opened: December 28, 2008

Technical
- Length: 2,550 metres (8,370 ft)
- No. of lanes: 2 x 2
- Operating speed: 50 kilometres per hour (31 mph)
- Width: 11.38 metres (37.3 ft) each side
- Grade: 4.3%

The Wuhan Yangtze River Tunnel (also known as the Wuhan Changjiang Tunnel), is the first tunnel under the Yangtze River. Trial operation commenced on December 28, 2008. It takes about seven minutes to cross the Yangtze River by car using the tunnel.

The tunnel connects Hankou and Wuchang districts in the city of Wuhan. Construction commenced in 2004.

Its length is 3,630 meters.

== See also ==
- Yangtze River bridges and tunnels
