= Bridges and tunnels across the Yangtze River =

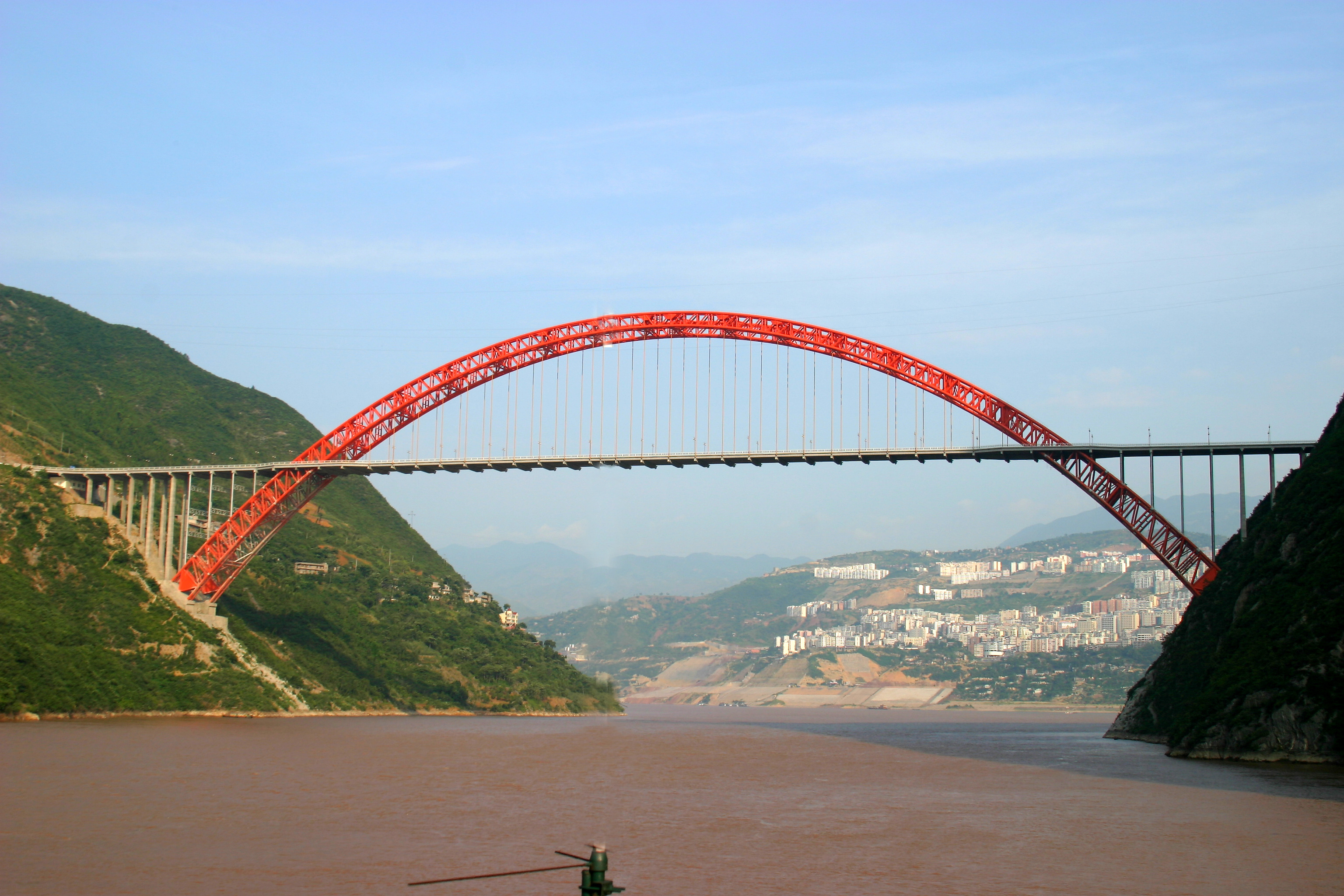
The Wushan Yangtze River Bridge in the Three Gorges of Chongqing.

The bridges and tunnels across the Yangtze River carry rail and road traffic across China's longest and largest river and form a vital part of the country's transportation infrastructure. The river bisects China proper from west to east, and every major north–south bound highway and railway must cross the Yangtze. Large urban centers along the river such as Chongqing, Wuhan, and Nanjing also have urban mass transit rail lines crossing the Yangtze.

Pontoon bridges have been used by militaries for two thousand years on the Yangtze, but until the completion of the Wuhan Yangtze River Bridge in 1957, there were no permanent bridges along the main stretch of the river known as Chang Jiang (the "Long River"), from Yibin to the river mouth in Shanghai, a distance of 2,884 km (1,792 mi). Since then, over 75 bridges and six tunnels have been built over this stretch, the overwhelming majority since 1990. They reflect a broad array of bridge designs and, in many cases, represent significant achievements in modern bridge engineering. Several rank among the world's longest suspension, cable-stayed, arch bridges, truss and box girder bridges as well as some of the highest and tallest bridges.

Upriver from Yibin, bridge spans are more common along the Jinsha and Tongtian sections where the Yangtze is much narrower, although numerous new bridges are being added. The oldest bridge still in use is the Jinlong, a simple suspension bridge over the Jinsha section of the river in Lijiang, Yunnan that was originally built in 1880 and rebuilt in 1936.

== Section names of the Yangtze ==
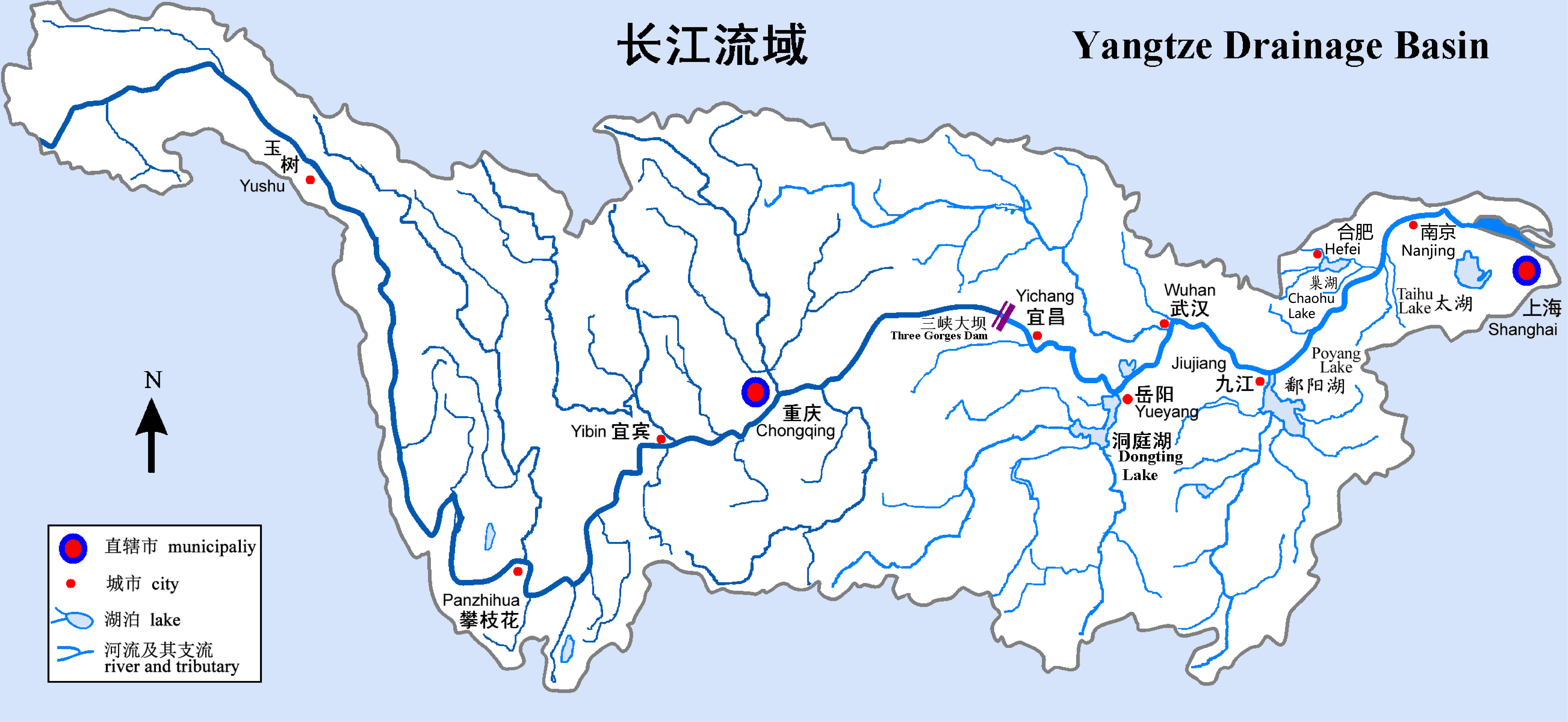
Map of the Yangtze River Basin, showing the location of Shanghai, Jiujiang, Wuhan, Yueyang, Yichang, the Three Gorges Dam, Chongqing, Yibin, Panzhihua and Yushu along the river.

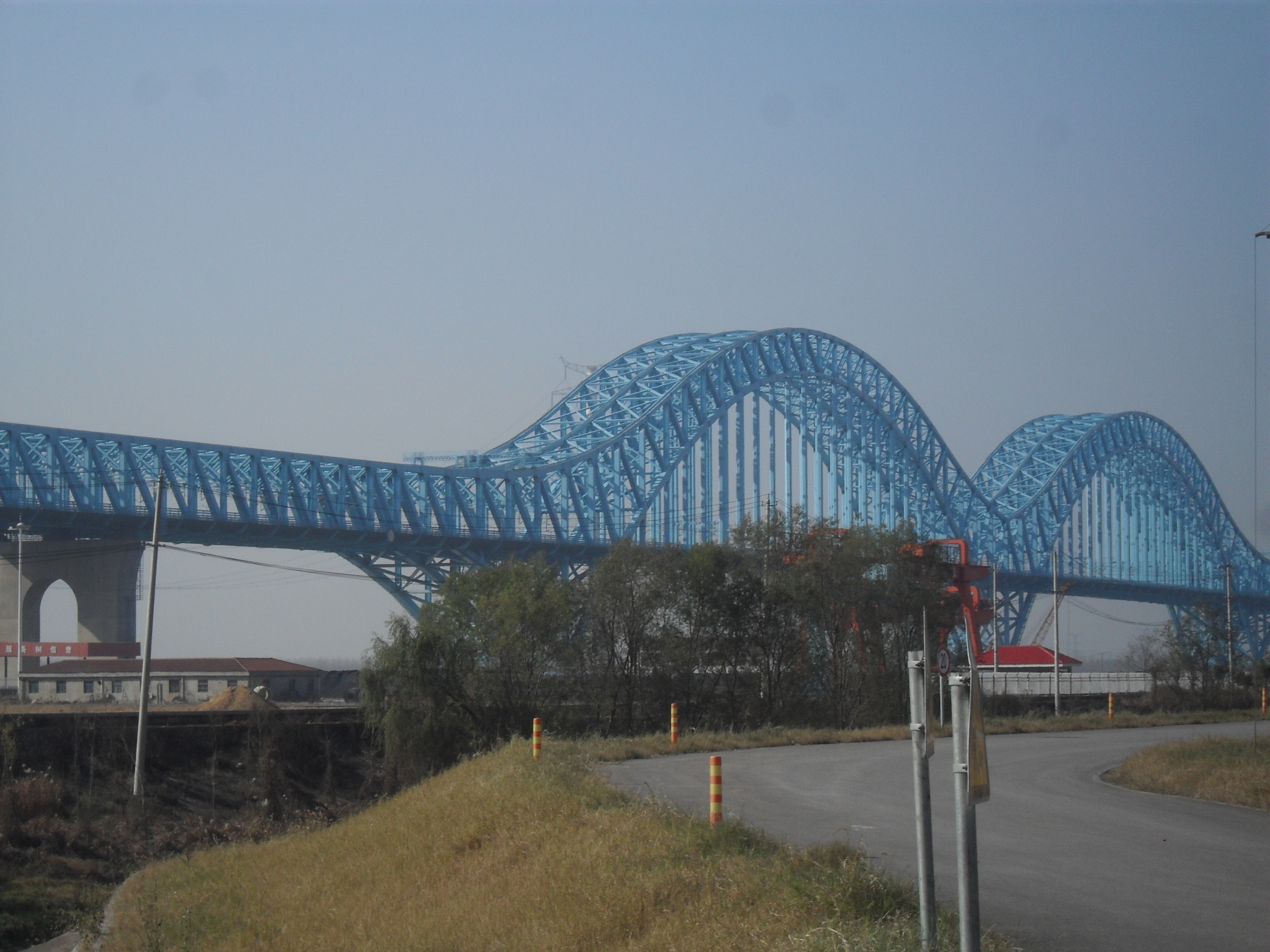
The Dashengguan Yangtze River Bridge in Nanjing

A high-speed train ride on the Beijing–Shanghai High-Speed Railway across the Dashengguan Bridge

Due to changes in the designation of the source of the Yangtze, various sections of the river have been thought of as distinct rivers with different names. The bridges and tunnels of the Yangtze have compound names consisting of the location name and the river section name. Today, the river has four sectional names in (in Chinese) : (1) Tuotuo, (2) Tongtian, (3) Jinsha and (4) Chang Jiang.

1. The Tuotuo River, considered the official headstream of the Yangtze, flows 358 km (222 mi) from the glaciers of the Gelaindong massif in the Tanggula Mountains of southwestern Qinghai to the confluence with the Dangqu River to form the Tongtian River.
2. The Tongtian continues for 813 km (505 mi) to the confluence with the Batang River at Yushu in south central Qinghai.
3. The Jinsha or Gold Sands River continues for 2,308 km (1,434 mi) along the border of western Sichuan with Qinghai, Tibet, and Yunnan, through northern Yunnan and southern Sichuan to the confluence with the Min River at Yibin in south central Sichuan.
4. Chang Jiang or the "Long River" refers to the final 2,884 km (1,792 mi) of the Yangtze from Yibin through southeastern Sichuan, Chongqing, western Hubei, northern Hunan, eastern Hubei, northern Jiangxi, Anhui and Jiangsu to the river's mouth in Shanghai. Chang Jiang is generally substituted by "Yangtze" in English usage.

For example, the Nanjing Chang Jiang Bridge is translated as the Nanjing Yangtze River Bridge. The Taku Jinsha River Bridge is a bridge along the Jinsha section of the Yangtze.

== History ==
The Yangtze River forms a major geographic barrier dividing northern and southern China. For millennia, travelers crossed the Yangtze by ferry. In the first half of the 20th century, rail passengers from Beijing to Guangzhou and Shanghai had to disembark, respectively, at Hanyang and Pukou, and cross the river by steam ferry before resuming journeys by train.

=== Bridges in antiquity ===
==== Pontoon bridges ====
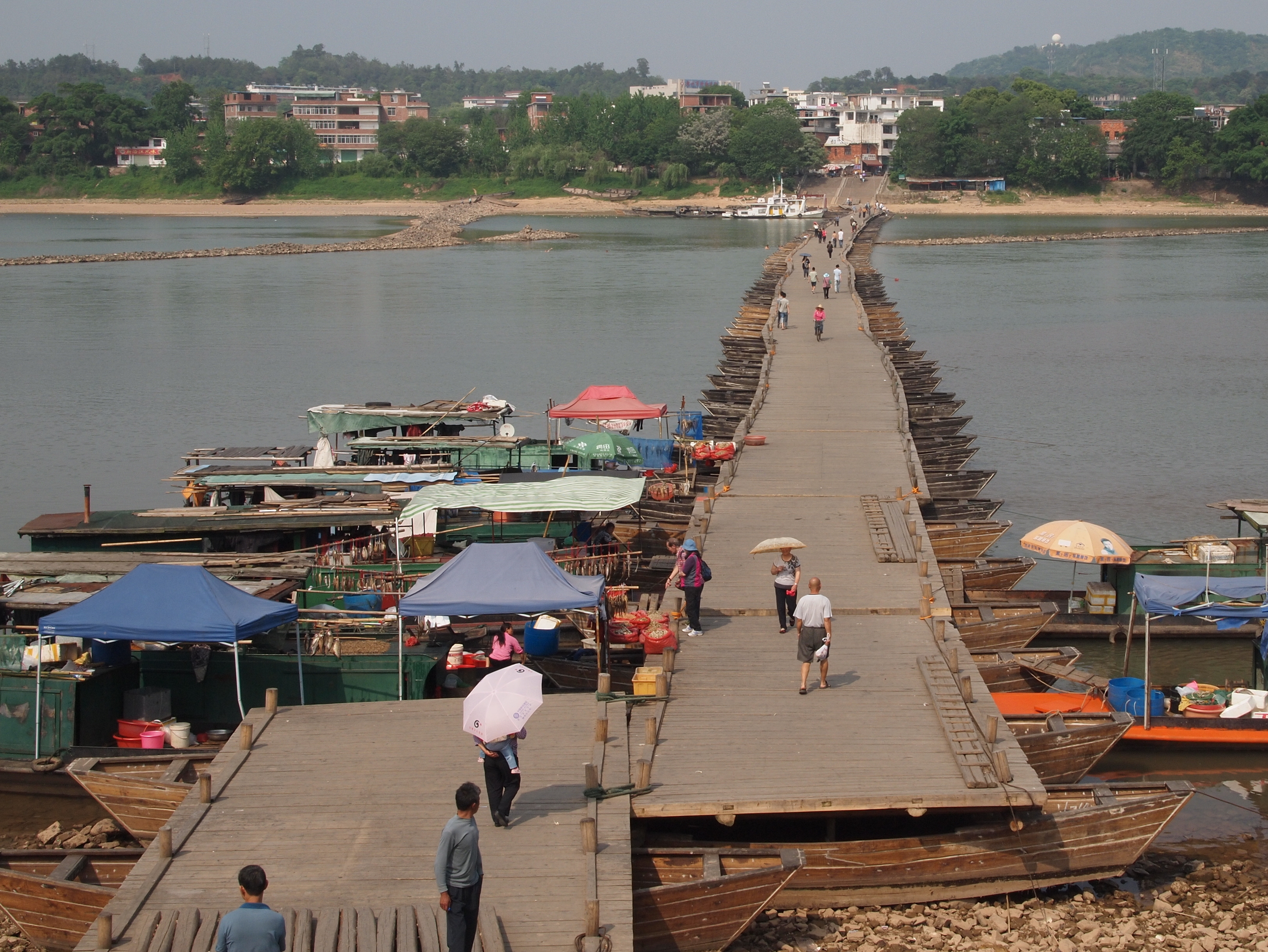
The Song dynasty Dongjin Bridge over the Gan River, a Yangtze tributary in Jiangxi.

The earliest recorded pontoon bridge over the Yangtze was the Jiangguan Pontoon Bridge built in AD 35 by Gongsun Shu, the ruler of Sichuan, in the war with the Han Emperor Liu Xiu. Gongsun Shu built the pontoon across a narrow part of the river between Jingmen and Yichang in (modern Hubei Province) to block the Han Emperor's navy from sailing upriver into Sichuan. The pontoon was burned in battle and Liu Xiu went on to capture Sichuan.

In 570, the Northern Zhou general Chen Teng built a crude suspension bridge across the Xiling Gorge using thick rope and reeds to carry food and provisions for his troops on the south bank. The bridge was cut apart by boats lined with sharp knives sent down river by the Chen general Zhang Shaoda.

During the Tang dynasty, a pontoon bridge was built in Sangouzhen in the Qutang Gorge in 619.

In 974, during the Song Emperor Zhao Kuangyin's conquest of the Southern Tang, a pontoon over 1,000 meters long linked together by bamboo chains was erected in just three days at Caishiji (Ma'anshan, Anhui Province) and enabled the Song Army to advance swiftly across the river and capture Nanjing, the Southern Tang capital.

The Taiping rebels made extensive use of pontoons on the Yangtze in their campaign against the Qing dynasty in the Yangtze Basin. On 30 December 1852, they built two pontoons nearly 3,000 meters long in a fortnight's time at Baishazhou and Yingwuzhou in Wuhan to move troops from Hanyang on the north bank to the Wuchang on the south bank. The Taipings tied together small boats into twos and threes and steered these preassembled pieces simultaneously into the river, and used iron anchors to set the pontoons instead of chains. They added leather-covered walls to the bridges and added towers and firing positions.

Pontoon bridges have not been a feasible long-term solution to cross river transport because they block boat traffic on the Yangtze, a major conduit for travelers and cargo between the coast and the Chinese interior.

==== Iron chain bridges ====
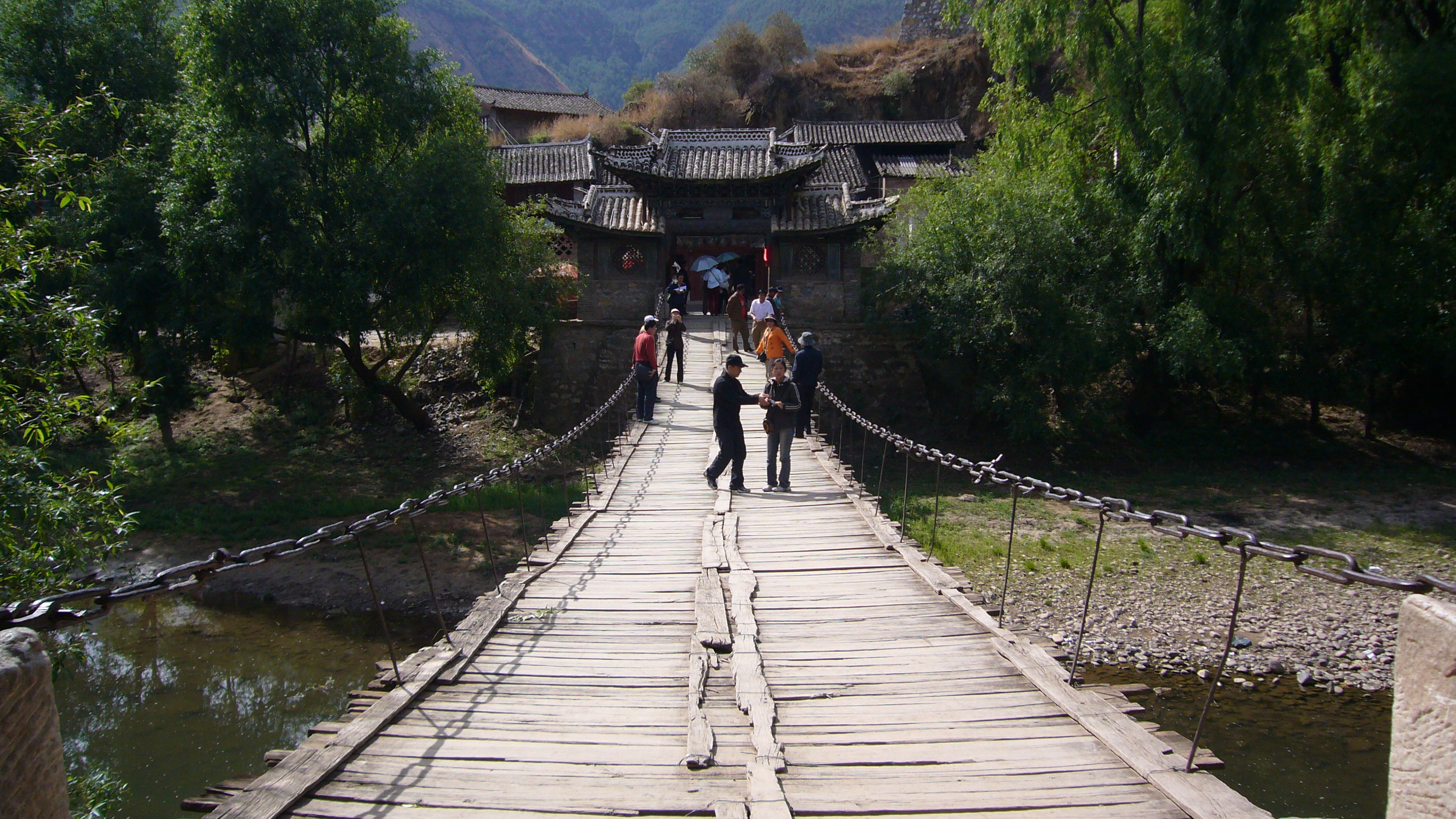
The Iron Rainbow (Tiehong) Bridge is a contemporary of the Jinlong Bridge over the Chongjiang River, a Yangtze tributary near the Great Bend in Shigu Town, Yulong Naxi Autonomous County, Lijiang, Yunnan.

Dating back to 3rd century, militaries of antiquity have stretched iron chains across the Yangtze in the Three Gorges to block invading armies. Notable examples include the iron chain defense of the Wu Kingdom in the Xiling Gorge against the Jin dynasty in 280, the Former Shu's chain across Kuimen in the Qutang Gorge against the Jingnan in 925, and Song general Xu Zongwu's seven-link chain at the same location against the Mongols in 1264.

The first documented iron chain bridge across the river was built in the 7th century by the Tibetan Empire over the Jinsha. The Shenchuan Iron Bridge, a simple suspension bridge, stood at what is today Tacun of Weixi Lisu Autonomous County in the Dêqên Tibetan Autonomous Prefecture of northwestern Yunnan Province, and was probably built to help the Tibetan military advance against the Kingdom of Nanzhao during its invasions between 682 and 704. The Tibetans stationed a frontier command office in the town called the Shenchuan Iron Bridge jiedushi. The bridge facilitated trade between the two countries until 794 when the Nanzhao realigned with the Tang dynasty and destroyed the bridge in a war with the Tibetan Empire.

The oldest bridge still in use on the Yangtze is the Jinlong Bridge in Lijiang, a simple iron chain suspension bridge first built during the Qing dynasty from 1876 to 1880. It was destroyed in a flood in 1935 and rebuilt the following year. The bridge was named a National Historical Site in 2006.

Iron chain bridges are more durable than pontoon bridges and allow for year-round use, although when the river level is high during the flood season, boards on the bridge deck must be removed.

=== Modern bridges ===
==== Chang Jiang ====
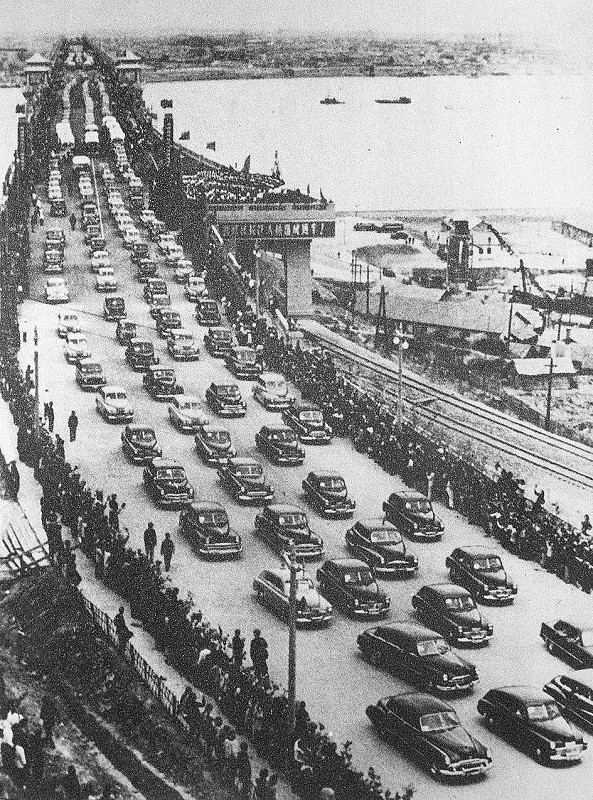
The opening of the Wuhan Yangtze River Bridge on 15 October 1957.

The first permanent bridge to cross the Chang Jiang section of the river was the Wuhan Yangtze River Bridge, built from 1955 to 1957. The dual-use road-rail bridge was a major infrastructural project in the early years of the People's Republic and was completed with Soviet assistance. The second bridge was a single-track railway bridge built in Chongqing in 1959. The Nanjing Yangtze River Bridge, also a road-rail bridge, was the first bridge to cross the lower reaches of the Yangtze. It was built from 1960 to 1968, after the Sino-Soviet split, and did not receive foreign assistance. The Zhicheng Road-Rail Bridge followed in 1971.

Only two bridges opened in the 1980s, the Chongqing's First Shibanpo Bridge in 1980 and the Luzhou Road Bridge in 1982. Both were in the upper reaches of Changjiang in Sichuan Province, to which Chongqing Municipality belonged at the time.

Bridge-building resumed in the 1990s and accelerated in the first decade of the 21st century due to the rapid growth of the Chinese economy. Jiangxi Province had its first bridge in 1993 with the opening of the Jiujiang Bridge. The first bridge in Anhui Province, the Tongling Bridge, opened in 1995. Six of the 11 bridges built in the 1990s and half of the 40 bridge crossings added in the 2000s were built in Chongqing Municipality, which became a directly controlled municipality in 1997 to facilitate the construction of the Three Gorges and experienced a building boom.

By 2005, there were over 50 bridges across the Yangtze River between Yibin and Shanghai. The rapid pace of bridge construction has continued. The first tunnel under the Yangtze opened in Wuhan in 2008.

As of December 2014, urban Chongqing has 18 bridges, Wuhan has nine bridges and three tunnels, and Nanjing has five bridges and two tunnels. About a dozen other bridges are now under construction.

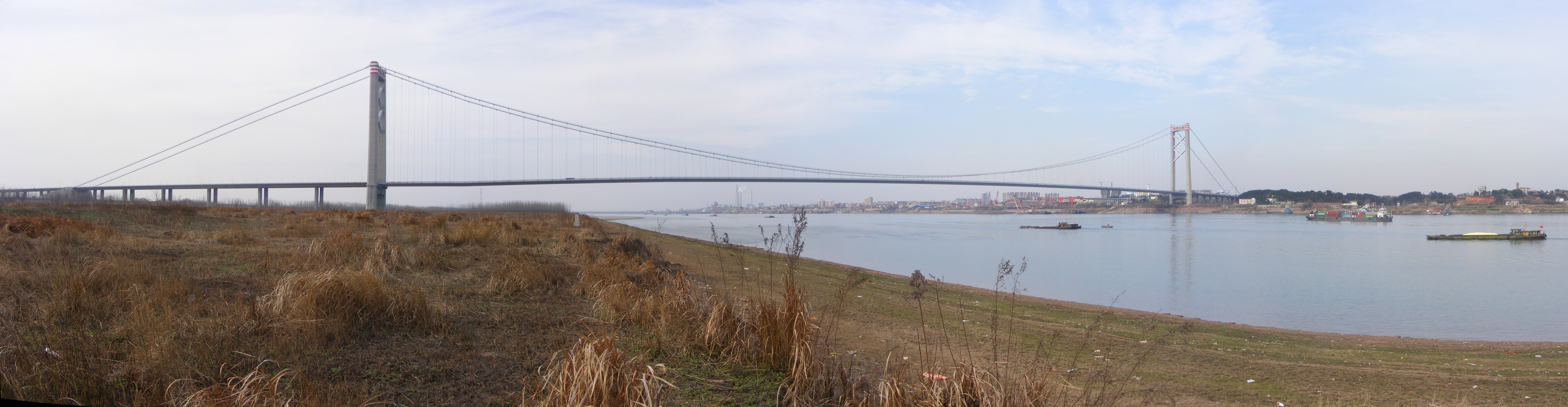
The Yangluo Bridge, which opened in 2007, is one of eight bridges across the Yangtze River in Wuhan, and is tied with the Golden Gate Bridge as the 18th longest suspension bridge in the world.

In December 2020 a new bridge is planned to be opened, the Wufengshan Yangtze River Bridge with 4 + 4 highway lanes on the upper deck and 4 railway tracks in the lower deck.

==== Upstream sections ====
The Jinshajiang Hutiaoxia Road and Railway Bridges over the Jinsha River just upstream from the Tiger Leaping Gorge in Lijiang, Yunnan.

In the upper reaches of the Yangtze above Yibin, the Jinsha (Gold Sands), Tongtian, and Tuotuo sections of the river are narrower and bridges are more numerous. As of December 2014, Yibin had 10 bridges across the Jinsha and Panzhihua had 16.

==== Bridge strain ====
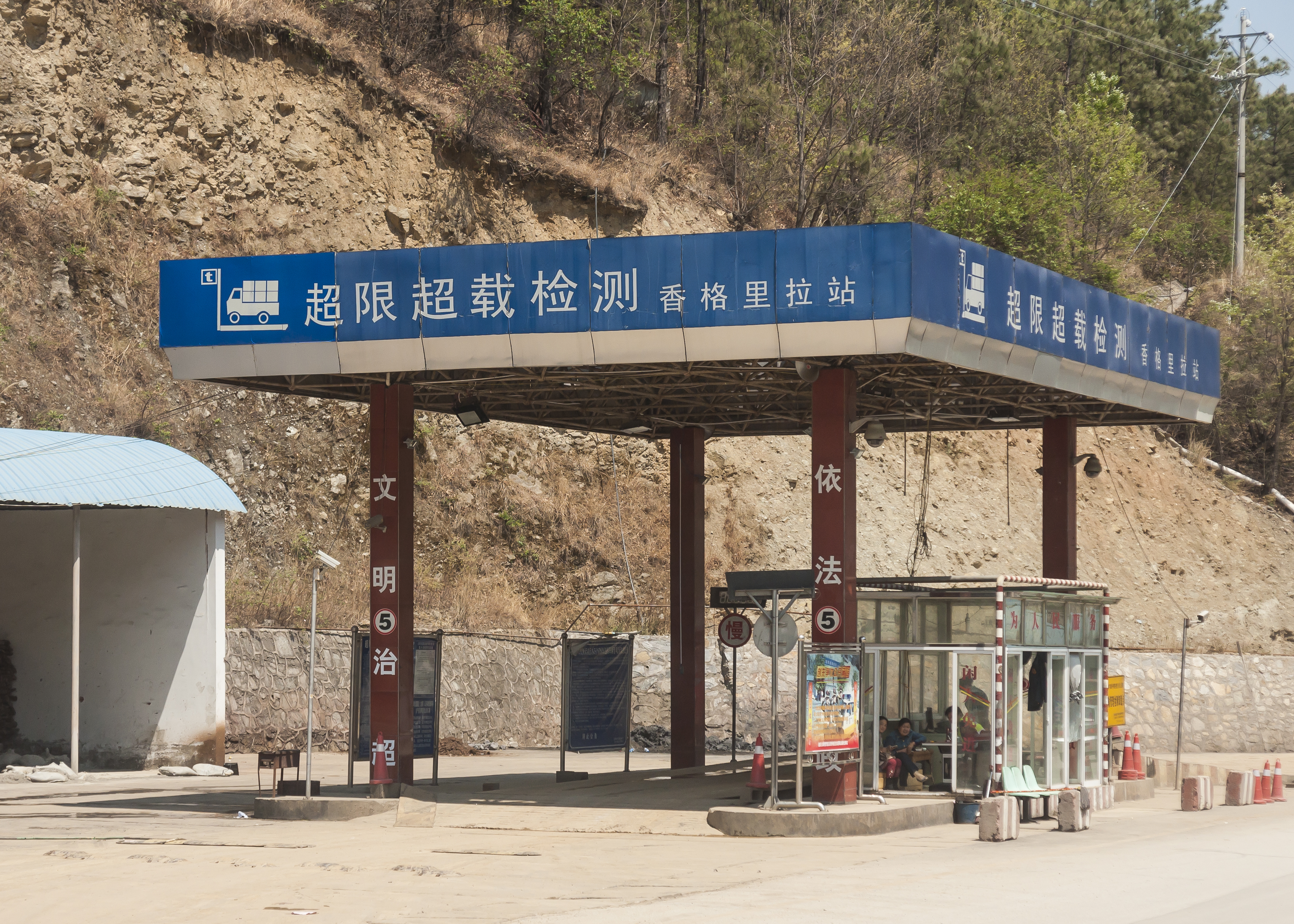
A weigh station for the Songyuan Bridge along the Jinsha River in Yunnan

With the advent of economic growth around the country and widespread use of heavy freight trucks, bridges along the Yangtze have been bearing greater load, leading to greater strain on older bridge structures. The Jiujiang Yangtze River Bridge was originally designed to carry trucks weighing up to 30 t (33 short tons). In 2008, the tonnage limit was raised to 55 t (61 short tons). In November 2011, a crack was discovered in the bridge's steel structure and forced the authorities to close the bridge to freight traffic. In February 2012, the tonnage limit was lowered to 20 t (22 short tons). Truck traffic had to be re-routed to neighboring provinces. In 2012, a crack was discovered in one girder of the Luzhou Yangtze River Bridge, leading to bridge closure and emergency repairs.

== Longest and tallest bridges ==
Bridges over the Yangtze including some of the longest and tallest bridges in the world.

- The Nanjing Xianxin Bridge [2025] (1,760 m (5,770 ft)), Yangsigang Bridge [2019] (1,700 m (5,600 ft)) and Ningyang Bridge [2025] (1,560 m (5,120 ft)) are all among the ten longest suspension bridges in the world. The Zhangjinggao Bridge (2,300 m (7,500 ft)) under construction will have the longest span among all bridges.
- The Changtai Bridge [2025] (1,176 m (3,858 ft)), Husutong Bridge [2020] (1,092 m (3,583 ft)), Sutong Bridge [2008] (1,088 m (3,570 ft)),Qingshan Yangtze River Bridge [2021] (938 m (3,077 ft)), Edong Bridge [2010] (926 m (3,038 ft)) and Jiayu Bridge [2019] (920 m (3,020 ft)) all have cable-stayed bridge spans that rank among the top ten in the world.
- The Chaotianmen Bridge [2009] (552 m (1,811 ft)) was the longest arch bridge in the world until 2020. The Bosideng Bridge [2012] (530 m (1,740 ft)), Zigui Bridge [2019] (519 m (1,703 ft)) and Hejiang Bridge [2021] (507 m (1,663 ft)) also rank in the top ten.
- The Dashengguan Bridge [2010] and Jiujiang Bridge [1992] rank among the longest continuous truss bridges by total truss length.
- The Changtai, Husutong, and Sutong Bridges rank among the ten tallest in the world.
- Chongqing's Second Shibanpo Bridge [2006] set a world record for box girder bridges with a longest span of 330 m (1,080 ft).
- The Yangsigang Bridge is the fourth longest suspension bridge in the world and the longest with a double-deck configuration.

=== Longest span timeline ===
| Year | Bridge | City | Province | Longest span | Type |
|---|---|---|---|---|---|
| 1957 | First Wuhan Bridge | Wuhan | Hubei | 128 m (420 ft) | truss |
| 1968 | First Nanjing Bridge | Nanjing | Jiangsu | 160 m (520 ft) | truss |
| 1971 | Zhicheng Bridge | Zhicheng | Hubei | 160 m (520 ft) | truss |
| 1980 | First Shibanpo Bridge | Chongqing | Sichuan | 174 m (571 ft) | beam |
| 1993 | Jiujiang Bridge | Jiujiang | Jiangxi | 216 m (709 ft) | truss & arch |
| 1995 | Lijiatuo Bridge | Jiulongpo District; Nan'an District | Chongqing | 444 m (1,457 ft) | cable-stayed |
| 1996 | Xiling Bridge | Yichang | Hubei | 900 m (3,000 ft) | suspension |
| 1999 | Jiangyin Bridge | Jingjiang, Jiangyin | Jiangsu | 1,385 m (4,544 ft) | suspension |
| 2005 | Runyang South Bridge | Shiye Island, Zhenjiang | Jiangsu | 1,490 m (4,890 ft) | suspension |
| 2019 | Yangsigang Bridge | Wuhan | Hubei | 1,700 m (5,600 ft) | suspension |

== List of existing bridges and tunnels ==
=== Chang Jiang(Yangtze River) ===
| Name | Image | Location | Province | Opened | Total length | Longest Span | Type | Carries | Coordinates |
|---|---|---|---|---|---|---|---|---|---|
| Shanghai Yangtze River Bridge (Note: Shanghai Yangtze River Tunnel, connecting Pudong on the south bank of the river and Changxing Island, the Shanghai Yangtze River Bridge between Changxing and Chongming Island, and the Chongming–Qidong Yangtze River Bridge linking Chongming with Qidong on the north bank of the river, collectively form one crossing near the river's mouth.) | | Chongming, Changxing | Shanghai | 2009 | 9,970 m (32,710 ft) | 730 m (2,400 ft) | cable-stayed | G40; G228 | 31.435°N 121.7442°E |
| Shanghai Yangtze River Tunnel | | Changxing, Pudong | Shanghai | 2009 | 8,950 m (29,360 ft) | – | tunnel | G40; G228 | 31.3258°N 121.6944°E |
| Chongqi Bridge | | Qidong, Chongming | Jiangsu, Shanghai | 2011 | 7,150 m (23,460 ft) | quadruple 185 m (607 ft) | box girder | G40; G228 | 31.6957°N 121.6663°E |
| Sutong Bridge | | Nantong, Changshu | Jiangsu | 2008 | 8,206 m (26,923 ft) | 1,088 m (3,570 ft) | cable-stayed | G15 | 31.7894°N 121.0022°E |
| Husutong Bridge | | Nantong, Zhangjiagang | Jiangsu | 2020 | 5,838 m (19,154 ft) | 1,092 m (3,583 ft) | cable-stayed | Jiangsu S19 Tonghu Railway, Tongsujiayong Railway | 32.02167°N 120.72500°E |
| Jiangyin Bridge | | Jingjiang, Jiangyin | Jiangsu | 1999 | 3,071 m (10,075 ft) | 1,385 m (4,544 ft) | suspension | G2 | 31.9492°N 120.2674°E |
| Changtai Bridge | | Changzhou, Taizhou | Jiangsu | 2025 | 10,030 m (32,910 ft) | 1,176 m (3,858 ft) | cable-stayed and arch | | |
| Taizhou Bridge Complex (Note: The Taizhou Bridge complex crosses two branch streams of the Yangtze and the Yangzhong island in the middle of the river. The bridge over the left stream is a suspension bridge with three towers and two spans. The bridge over the right stream is a pair of box-girder bridges configured as 85+125x3+85 = 545 m (1,788 ft) and 85+125x2+85=420 m (1,380 ft)) | main bridge | Taizhou, Yangzhong | Jiangsu | 2012 | 9,726 m (31,909 ft) | double 1,080 m (3,540 ft) | suspension | Jiangsu S35 | 32.2466°N 119.8767°E |
| Taizhou Bridge Complex | jiajiang bridge | Yangzhong, Zhenjiang | Jiangsu | 2012 | 9,726 m (31,909 ft) | triple 125 m (410 ft) | box girder | Jiangsu S35 | 32.2466°N 119.8767°E |
| Wufengshan Yangtze River Bridge | | Yangzhong, Zhenjiang | Jiangsu | 2020 | 6,404 m (21,010 ft) | 1,092 m (3,583 ft) | suspension | Jiangsu S39 Lianzhen HSR, Yangma ICR | |
| Runyang Bridge Complex (Note: Runyang Bridge complex crosses the Yangtze via Shiye Island and consists of two main bridges. The Runyang North Bridge is a suspension bridge over the north branch stream between the island and Yangzhou. The Runyang South Bridge is a cable-stayed bridge over the south branch stream between the island and Zhenjiang.) | north stream | Yangzhou, Zhenjiang | Jiangsu | 2005 | 7,210 m (23,650 ft) | 406 m (1,332 ft) | cable-stayed | G4011 | 32.2072°N 119.3637°E |
| Runyang Bridge Complex | south stream | Zhenjiang | Jiangsu | 2005 | 7,210 m (23,650 ft) | 1,490 m (4,890 ft) | suspension | G4011 | 32.2072°N 119.3637°E |
| Ningyang Bridge | | Nanjing | Jiangsu | 2025 | | 1,560 m (5,120 ft) | suspension | | |
| Qixiashan Bridge | | Nanjing | Jiangsu | 2012 | 5,448 m (17,874 ft) | 1,418 m (4,652 ft) | suspension | G25; G2503 | 32.1780°N 118.9401°E |
| Nanjing Xianxin Bridge | | Nanjing | Jiangsu | 2025 | | 1,760 m (5,770 ft) | suspension | | |
| Baguazhou Bridge | north stream | Nanjing | Jiangsu | 2001 | 2,172 m (7,126 ft) | triple 165 m (541 ft) | box girder | G36 | 32.1626°N 118.8362°E |
| Baguazhou Bridge | south stream | Nanjing | Jiangsu | 2001 | 2,938 m (9,639 ft) | 628 m (2,060 ft) | cable-stayed | G36 G104; S001 | 32.1626°N 118.8362°E |
| Nanjing Metro Line 3 Tunnel | | Nanjing | Jiangsu | 2015 | 3,100 m (10,200 ft) | – | tunnel | Line 3 | |
| Nanjing Yangtze River Bridge | | Nanjing | Jiangsu | 1968 | 4,588 m (15,052 ft) (road part) 6,772 m (22,218 ft) (railway part) | triple 160 m (520 ft) | truss | 4-lane highway Jinghu Railway | 32.1153°N 118.7389°E |
| Dinghuaimen Tunnel | | Nanjing | Jiangsu | 2016 | 7,368 m (24,173 ft) | – | tunnel | 8-lane highway | Unknown |
| Yingtian Avenue Tunnel | | Nanjing | Jiangsu | 2009 | 3,828 m (12,559 ft) | – | tunnel | 6-lane highway | 31.9706°N 118.6411°E |
| Jiajiang Bridge | | Nanjing | Jiangsu | 2010 | 665.5 m (2,183 ft) | 248 m (814 ft) | suspension | 6-lane highway | |
| Nanjing Metro Line 10 Tunnel | | Nanjing | Jiangsu | 2014 | 3,345 m (10,974 ft) | – | tunnel | Line 10 | |
| Jiangxinzhou Bridge 南京江心洲长江大桥 | main bridge | Nanjing | Jiangsu | 2020 | 4,300 m (14,100 ft) | double 600 m (2,000 ft) | cable-stayed | G205; G312 S001 | |
| Jiangxinzhou Bridge 南京江心洲长江大桥 | Jiangshan Street tunnel | Nanjing | Jiangsu | 2020 | 1,758 m (5,768 ft) | – | tunnel | G205; G312 S001 | |
| Dashengguan Road Bridge | | Nanjing | Jiangsu | 2005 | 4,788 m (15,709 ft) | 648 m (2,126 ft) | cable-stayed | G42; G2503 | 31.9706°N 118.6411°E |
| Dashengguan Railway Bridge | | Nanjing | Jiangsu | 2009 | 9,270 m (30,410 ft) | double 336 m (1,102 ft) | combined arch and truss | Jinghu HSR; Hening Railway Line S3 | 31.9598°N 118.6310°E |
| Ma'anshan Bridge Complex (Note: The Ma'anshan Bridge complex crosses two branch streams of the Yangtze and the Xiaohuangzhou island in the middle of the river. The bridge over the left stream is a suspension bridge with three towers and two spans. The bridge over the right stream is a cable-stayed bridge with three towers and two spans.) | left stream | He County, Dangtu County | Anhui | 2013 | 10,900 m (35,800 ft) | double 1,080 m (3,540 ft) | suspension | G4221 | 31.6101°N 118.3921°E |
| Ma'anshan Bridge Complex | right stream | Dangtu County, Ma'anshan | Anhui | 2013 | 10,900 m (35,800 ft) | double 260 m (850 ft) | cable-stayed | G4221 | 31.6101°N 118.3921°E |
| Wuhu Bridge | | Wuwei, Wuhu | Anhui | 2000 | 5,681 m (18,638 ft) (road part) 10,521 m (34,518 ft) (railway part) | 312 m (1,024 ft) | combined cable-stayed and truss | G5011; Huainan Railway | 31.3878°N 118.3353°E |
| Third Wuhu Bridge 芜湖长江三桥 | | Wuwei, Wuhu | Anhui | 2020 | 1,218 m (3,996 ft) | 588 m (1,929 ft) | cable-stayed | 8-lane highway Shanghang HSR Wuhu metro line 1 | 31.3519°N 118.3464°E |
| Second Wuhu Bridge | | Wuhu | Anhui | 2017 | 13,975 m (45,850 ft) | 806 m (2,644 ft) | cable-stayed | Anhui S11 | 31.235833°N 118.137222°E |
| Tongling Road-railway Bridge | | Wuwei, Yi'an District | Anhui | 2015 | 16,719 m (54,852 ft) | 630 m (2,070 ft) | combined cable-stayed and truss | Anhui S30 Hefu HSR Lutong Railway | 31.082778°N 117.973889°E |
| Tongling Bridge | | Tongling | Anhui | 1995 | 2,592 m (8,504 ft) | 432 m (1,417 ft) | cable-stayed | G3; G330 | 30.8560°N 117.7268°E |
| Third Tongling Bridge | | Tongling | Anhui | 2025 | | 988 m (3,241 ft) | | | |
| Chizhou Bridge | | Zongyang County, Chizhou | Anhui | 2019 | 10,700 m (35,100 ft) | 828 m (2,717 ft) | cable-stayed | G0321 | 30.6938°N 117.3484°E |
| Anqing Railway Bridge | | Anqing, Chizhou | Anhui | 2015 | 2,996.8 m (9,832 ft) | 580 m (1,900 ft) | combined cable-stayed and truss | Ning'an ICR, Lu'anjing railway | 30.5728°N 117.2472°E |
| Anqing Bridge | | Anqing, Dongzhi County | Anhui | 2004 | 5,985.66 m (19,638.0 ft) | 510 m (1,670 ft) | cable-stayed | G50 G4212 | 30.4991°N 117.0714°E |
| Wangdong Yangtze River Bridge 望东长江大桥 | | Wangjiang County, Dongzhi County | Anhui | 2016 | 4,035 m (13,238 ft) | 638 m (2,093 ft) | cable-stayed | G35 | 30.100278°N 116.790278°E |
| Jiujiang Bridge | | Huangmei, Jiujiang | Hubei, Jiangxi | 1993 | 4,460 m (14,630 ft) (road part) 7,675 m (25,180 ft) (railway part) | 216 m (709 ft) | combined arch and truss | G105; Jingjiu Railway | 29.7502°N 116.0136°E |
| Jiujiang Expressway Bridge | | Huangmei, Jiujiang | Hubei, Jiangxi | 2013 | 8,462 m (27,762 ft) | 818 m (2,684 ft) | cable-stayed | G70 | 29.722306°N 115.908444°E |
| Bianyuzhou Railway Bridge | | Huangmei, Jiujiang | Hubei, Jiangxi | | | | cable-stayed | | |
| Wuxue Bridge | | Wuxue, Yangxin County | Hubei eastern | 2021 | 1,403 m (4,603 ft) | 808 m (2,651 ft) | cable-stayed | Hubei S29 | |
| Qipanzhou Bridge | | Qichun County, Yangxin County | Hubei eastern | 2021 | 3,728 m (12,231 ft) | 1,038 m (3,406 ft) | suspension | Hubei S78 | |
| Huangshi Bridge | | Huangshi, Xishui County | Hubei eastern | 1995 | 2,580 m (8,460 ft) | triple 245 m (804 ft) | beam | S201 | 30.2512°N 115.07201°E |
| Edong Bridge | | Huangshi, Xishui County | Hubei eastern | 2010 | 5,886 m (19,311 ft) | 926 m (3,038 ft) | cable-stayed | G45 G50 G70 | 30.2607°N 115.0744°E |
| Ehuang Bridge | | Huanggang, Ezhou | Hubei eastern | 2002 | 3,245 m (10,646 ft) | 480 m (1,570 ft) | cable-stayed | G106 | 30.4121°N 114.9193°E |
| Huanggang Bridge 黄冈长江大桥 | | Huanggang, Ezhou | Hubei eastern | 2014 | 4,008.2 m (13,150 ft) | 567 m (1,860 ft) | combined cable-stayed and truss | Hubei S31; Wuhuang ICR | 30.4981°N 114.8342°E |
| Shuangliu Bridge | | Huanggang, Ezhou | Hubei eastern | 2026 | | 1,430 m (4,690 ft) | suspension | | |
| Yangluo Bridge | | Wuhan | Hubei eastern | 2007 | 3,425 m (11,237 ft) | 1,280 m (4,200 ft) | suspension | G70 G4201 | 30.6242°N 114.5578°E |
| Qingshan Bridge | north stream | Wuhan | Hubei eastern | 2021 | 5,914 m (19,403 ft) | 110 m (360 ft) | box-girder | Hubei S40 (Wuhan Fourth Ring Road) | |
| Qingshan Bridge | south stream | Wuhan | Hubei eastern | 2021 | 5,914 m (19,403 ft) | 938 m (3,077 ft) | cable-stayed | Hubei S40 (Wuhan Fourth Ring Road) | |
| Tianxingzhou Bridge | | Wuhan | Hubei eastern | 2009 | 4,657 m (15,279 ft) | 504 m (1,654 ft) | combined cable-stayed and truss | G316 Wuhan Third Ring Road; Jingguang HSR; Shewu Railway | 30.6569°N 114.4050°E |
| Erqi Bridge | | Wuhan | Hubei eastern | 2011 | 6,507 m (21,348 ft) | double 616 m (2,021 ft) | cable-stayed | Wuhan Second Ring Road | 30.6276°N 114.3420°E |
| Second Wuhan Bridge | | Wuhan | Hubei eastern | 1995 | 3,971.4 m (13,030 ft) | 400 m (1,300 ft) | cable-stayed | Wuhan Inner Ring Road | 30.6051°N 114.32012°E |
| Wuhan Metro Line 8 Tunnel | | Wuhan | Hubei eastern | 2017 | 3,186 m (10,453 ft) | – | tunnel | Line 8 | |
| Wuhan Yangtze River Road-Railway Tunnel | | Wuhan | Hubei eastern | 2018 | 2,590 m (8,500 ft) | – | tunnel | 6-lane highway Line 7 | |
| Wuhan Yangtze River Tunnel | | Wuhan | Hubei eastern | 2008 | 3,630 m (11,910 ft) | – | tunnel | 4-lane highway | 30.5792°N 114.3072°E |
| Wuhan Metro Line 2 Tunnel | | Wuhan | Hubei eastern | 2012 | 3,098 m (10,164 ft) | – | tunnel | Line 2 | |
| Wuhan Yangtze River Bridge | | Wuhan | Hubei eastern | 1957 | 1,670 m (5,480 ft) | triple 128 m (420 ft) | truss | G107 Wuhan Inner Ring Road; Jingguang Railway | 30.5497°N 114.2882°E |
| Wuhan Metro Line 4 Tunnel | | Wuhan | Hubei eastern | 2014 | 3,003 m (9,852 ft) | – | tunnel | Line 4 | |
| Yingwuzhou Bridge | | Wuhan | Hubei eastern | 2014 | 3,420 m (11,220 ft) | double 850 m (2,790 ft) | suspension | Wuhan Second Ring Road | 30.5308°N 114.2794°E |
| Yangsigang Bridge | | Wuhan | Hubei eastern | 2019 | 4,317.8 m (14,166 ft) | 1,700 m (5,600 ft) | suspension | Yangsigang rapid corridor | 30.5067°N 114.2568°E |
| Baishazhou Bridge | | Wuhan | Hubei eastern | 2000 | 3,586.38 m (11,766.3 ft) | 618 m (2,028 ft) | cable-stayed | G107 Wuhan Third Ring Road | 30.4846°N 114.2455°E |
| Zhuankou Bridge | | Wuhan | Hubei eastern | 2017 | 5,296 m (17,375 ft) | 760 m (2,490 ft) | cable-stayed | Hubei S40 (Wuhan Fourth Ring Road) | |
| Junshan Bridge | | Wuhan | Hubei eastern | 2001 | 2,847 m (9,341 ft) | 460 m (1,510 ft) | cable-stayed | G4 G50 G4201 | 30.374028°N 114.140278°E |
| Jiayu Bridge | | Honghu, Jiayu County | Hubei eastern | 2019 | 4,690 m (15,390 ft) | 920 m (3,020 ft) | cable-stayed | Hubei S43 Hubei S78 | |
| Chibi Bridge | | Honghu, Chibi | Hubei eastern | 2021 | 1,380 m (4,530 ft) | 720 m (2,360 ft) | cable-stayed | G351 Hubei S86 | |
| Jingyue Bridge | | Jianli, Yueyang | Hubei, Hunan | 2010 | 4,302.5 m (14,116 ft) | 816 m (2,677 ft) | cable-stayed | G0421 | 29.54434°N 113.222433°E |
| Shishou Bridge | | Shishou | Hubei western | 2019 | 2,670 m (8,760 ft) | 820 m (2,690 ft) | cable-stayed | G234 Hubei S53 | |
| Jingzhou Yangtze River Road-railway Bridge 荆州长江公铁大桥 | | Jiangling County, Gong'an County | Hubei western | 2019 | 6,317.672 m (20,727.27 ft) | 518 m (1,699 ft) | cable-stayed | G351 Hubei S61 Haoji Railway | |
| Jingzhou Bridge | north stream | Jingzhou, Gong'an County | Hubei western | 2002 | 4,397.5 m (14,427 ft) | 500 m (1,600 ft) | cable-stayed | G55 G207 | 30.308837°N 112.21628°E |
| Jingzhou Bridge | south stream | Jingzhou, Gong'an County | Hubei western | 2002 | 4,397.5 m (14,427 ft) | 300 m (980 ft) | cable-stayed | G55 G207 | 30.308837°N 112.21628°E |
| Zhicheng Bridge | | Zhijiang, Yidu | Hubei western | 1971 | 1,745 m (5,725 ft) (road part) 1,742 m (5,715 ft) (railway part) | quadruple 160 m (520 ft) | truss | S225; Jiaoliu railway | 30.286086°N 111.526442°E |
| Yidu Bridge | | Zhijiang, Yidu | Hubei western | 2021 | 2,216 m (7,270 ft) | 1,000 m (3,300 ft) | suspension | G59 | |
| Yichang Bridge | | Yichang, Yidu | Hubei western | 2001 | 1,188.3 m (3,899 ft) | 960 m (3,150 ft) | suspension | G50 G4223 | 30.569601°N 111.391536°E |
| Wujiagang Bridge | | Yichang | Hubei western | 2021 | 2,813 m (9,229 ft) | 1,160 m (3,810 ft) | suspension | 6-lane highway | 30.617486°N 111.360031°E |
| Yichang Railway Bridge | | Yichang | Hubei western | 2007 | 2,518.7 m (8,263 ft) | double 275 m (902 ft) | combined arch and beam | Yiwan Railway | 30.655944°N 111.325583°E |
| Yiling Bridge | | Yichang | Hubei western | 2001 | 3,246 m (10,650 ft) | double 348 m (1,142 ft) | cable-stayed | S323 | 30.684131°N 111.289515°E |
| Zhixi Yangtze River Bridge 至喜长江大桥 | Yangtze Main Bridge | Yichang | Hubei western | 2016 | 3,234.7 m (10,613 ft) | 838 m (2,749 ft) | suspension | G241 | 30.4252°N 111.1623°E |
| Zhixi Yangtze River Bridge 至喜长江大桥 | Sanjiang Bridge | Yichang | Hubei western | 2016 | 3,234.7 m (10,613 ft) | 210 m (690 ft) | cable-stayed | G241 | 30.4252°N 111.1623°E |
| Xiling Bridge | | Yichang | Hubei western | 1996 | 1,118.66 m (3,670.1 ft) | 900 m (3,000 ft) | suspension | 4-lane highway | 30.8285°N 111.0465°E |
| Zigui Bridge | | Zigui County | Hubei western | 2019 | 883.2 m (2,898 ft) | 531.2 m (1,743 ft) | combined arch and truss | S255 | 30.9575°N 110.763333°E |
| Badong Bridge | | Badong | Hubei western | 2004 | 908 m (2,979 ft) | 388 m (1,273 ft) | cable-stayed | G209 G348 | 31.048556°N 110.328472°E |
| Wushan Bridge | | Wushan County | Chongqing | 2005 | 612.2 m (2,009 ft) | 460 m (1,510 ft) | arch | S301 | 31.063056°N 109.902111°E |
| Fengjie Bridge | | Fengjie | Chongqing | 2006 | 930 m (3,050 ft) | 460 m (1,510 ft) | cable-stayed | G242 | 31.020306°N 109.480944°E |
| Fuxing Bridge | | Yunyang | Chongqing | 2026 | | 1,208 m (3,963 ft) | suspension | | |
| Yunyang Bridge | | Yunyang | Chongqing | 2005 | 637 m (2,090 ft) | 318 m (1,043 ft) | cable-stayed | S305 | 30.9155°N 108.71175°E |
| Fuma Bridge | | Wanzhou | Chongqing | 2017 | 2,003 m (6,572 ft) | 1,050 m (3,440 ft) | suspension | G69 | |
| Second Wanzhou Bridge | | Wanzhou | Chongqing | 2004 | 1,194 m (3,917 ft) | 580 m (1,900 ft) | suspension | 4-lane highway | 30.825889°N 108.404778°E |
| Third Wanzhou Bridge | | Wanzhou | Chongqing | 2019 | 2,200 m (7,200 ft) | 730 m (2,400 ft) | cable-stayed | 6-lane highway | 30.787222°N 108.403056°E |
| Wanzhou Railway Bridge | | Wanzhou | Chongqing | 2005 | 1,106.3 m (3,630 ft) | 360 m (1,180 ft) | combined arch and truss | Yiwan Railway | 30.769778°N 108.416528°E |
| Wanzhou Bridge | | Wanzhou | Chongqing | 1997 | 856 m (2,808 ft) | 420 m (1,380 ft) | arch | G211 G318 | 30.759611°N 108.419278°E |
| Xintian Bridge | | Wanzhou | Chongqing | 2022 | 1,770 m (5,810 ft) | 1,020 m (3,350 ft) | suspension | G5012 | |
| Zhongxian Bridge | | Zhong County | Chongqing | 2001 | 1,200 m (3,900 ft) | 560 m (1,840 ft) | suspension | G350 | 30.301833°N 108.049111°E |
| Zhongzhou Bridge | | Zhong County | Chongqing | 2009 | 2,145.2 m (7,038 ft) | 460 m (1,510 ft) | cable-stayed | G50 G5515 | 30.231944°N 108.005833°E |
| Fengdu Second Bridge 丰都长江二桥 | | Fengdu | Chongqing | 2017 | 2,234 m (7,329 ft) | 680 m (2,230 ft) | cable-stayed | G348 | 29.866073°N 107.712039°E |
| Fengdu Bridge | | Fengdu | Chongqing | 1997 | 620 m (2,030 ft) | 450 m (1,480 ft) | suspension | G351 | 29.855417°N 107.669722°E |
| Hanjiatuo Bridge | | Fuling | Chongqing | 2011 | 1,137.5 m (3,732 ft) | 432 m (1,417 ft) | combined cable-stayed and truss | Yuli Railway | 29.767694°N 107.417278°E |
| Fuling Yangtze River pipeline bridge 涪陵长江管道桥 | | Fuling | Chongqing | 1991 | 730 m (2,400 ft) | 400 m (1,300 ft) | cable-stayed | gas pipeline | |
| Shiban'gou Bridge | | Fuling | Chongqing | 2009 | 1,307 m (4,288 ft) | 450 m (1,480 ft) | cable-stayed | 4-lane highway | 29.730694°N 107.405944°E |
| Fuling Bridge | | Fuling | Chongqing | 1997 | 631 m (2,070 ft) | 303 m (994 ft) | cable-stayed | G319 | 29.7365°N 107.346806°E |
| Lidu Bridge | | Fuling | Chongqing | 2009 | 822 m (2,697 ft) | 398 m (1,306 ft) | cable-stayed | 4-lane highway | 29.727028°N 107.293472°E |
| Qingcaobei Yangtze River Bridge 青草背长江大桥 | | Fuling | Chongqing | 2013 | 1,652 m (5,420 ft) | 788 m (2,585 ft) | suspension | G9909 | 29.5711718°N 107.285541°E |
| Changshou Bridge | | Changshou District | Chongqing | 2009 | 1,146 m (3,760 ft) | 460 m (1,510 ft) | cable-stayed | S103 | 29.816444°N 107.057028°E |
| Changshou Economic Development Area Yangtze River Bridge 长寿经开区长江大桥 | | Changshou District | Chongqing | 2021 | 1,401 m (4,596 ft) | 739 m (2,425 ft) | suspension | 6-lane highway | |
| Changshou Railway Bridge | | Changshou District | Chongqing | 2004 | 898 m (2,946 ft) | double 192 m (630 ft) | truss | Yuhuai Railway | 29.772796°N 106.991546°E |
| Taihong Yangtze River Bridge 太洪长江大桥 | | Yubei District, Banan District | Chongqing | 2020 | 1,436 m (4,711 ft) | 808 m (2,651 ft) | suspension | Chongqing S37 | |
| Mingyuexia Yangtze River Bridge 明月峡长江大桥 | | Jiangbei District, Nan'an District | Chongqing | 2022 | 810 m (2,660 ft) | 425 m (1,394 ft) | cable-stayed | Chongqing east ring railway | |
| Yuzui Bridge | | Jiangbei District, Nan'an District | Chongqing | 2008 | 1,438 m (4,718 ft) | 616 m (2,021 ft) | suspension | G5001 | 29.611306°N 106.772556°E |
| Guojiatuo Yangtze River Bridge 郭家沱长江大桥 | | Jiangbei District, Nan'an District | Chongqing | 2023 | 1,363 m (4,472 ft) | 720 m (2,360 ft) | suspension | 8-lane highway | |
| Cuntan Yangtze River Bridge 寸滩长江大桥 | | Jiangbei District, Nan'an District | Chongqing | 2017 | 1,600 m (5,200 ft) | 880 m (2,890 ft) | suspension | 8-lane highway | 29°37′14.2″N106°36′21.8″E |
| Dafosi Bridge | | Jiangbei District, Nan'an District | Chongqing | 2001 | 1,168 m (3,832 ft) | 450 m (1,480 ft) | cable-stayed | G65 | 29.606667°N 106.582639°E |
| Chaotianmen Bridge | | Jiangbei District, Nan'an District | Chongqing | 2009 | 4,881 m (16,014 ft) | 552 m (1,811 ft) | combined arch and truss | 6-lane highway Loop line | 29.588871°N 106.57721°E |
| Dongshuimen Bridge | | Yuzhong District, Nan'an District | Chongqing | 2014 | 967 m (3,173 ft) | 445 m (1,460 ft) | combined cable-stayed and truss | 4-lane highway Line 6 | 29.5608°N 106.5869°E |
| Nanjimen Yangtze River bridge | | Yuzhong District, Nan'an District | Chongqing | 2023 | 1,224 m (4,016 ft) | 480 m (1,570 ft) | cable-stayed | Line 10 | |
| Shibanpo Bridge | | Yuzhong District, Nan'an District | Chongqing | 1980 | 1,121 m (3,678 ft) | 174 m (571 ft) | beam | 4-lane highway | 29.545556°N 106.559889°E |
| dual roadway bridge of Shibanpo Bridge 石板坡长江大桥复线桥 | | Yuzhong District, Nan'an District | Chongqing | 2006 | 1,103.5 m (3,620 ft) | 330 m (1,080 ft) | beam | 4-lane highway | 29.545556°N 106.559889°E |
| Caiyuanba Bridge | | Yuzhong District, Nan'an District | Chongqing | 2007 | 1,866 m (6,122 ft) | 420 m (1,380 ft) | arch | 6-lane highway Line 3 | 29.543222°N 106.547944°E |
| E'gongyan Bridge | | Jiulongpo District, Nan'an District | Chongqing | 2000 | 1,420 m (4,660 ft) | 600 m (2,000 ft) | suspension | 6-lane highway | 29.52325°N 106.528056°E |
| Egongyan Rail Transit Bridge | | Jiulongpo District, Nan'an District | Chongqing | 2019 | 1,650 m (5,410 ft) | 600 m (2,000 ft) | suspension | Loop line | |
| Lijiatuo Bridge | | Dadukou District, Ba'nan District | Chongqing | 1995 | 1,288 m (4,226 ft) | 444 m (1,457 ft) | cable-stayed | 4-lane highway | 29.479472°N 106.528444°E |
| Lijiatuo Yangtze River Dual-lang Bridge 李家沱长江大桥复线桥 | | Dadukou District, Ba'nan District | Chongqing | 2023 | 1,300 m (4,300 ft) | 454 m (1,490 ft) | cable-stayed | Line 18 | |
| Masangxi Bridge | | Dadukou District, Ba'nan District | Chongqing | 2001 | 1,104.3 m (3,623 ft) | 360 m (1,180 ft) | cable-stayed | G75 | 29.457667°N 106.494194°E |
| Baijusi Bridge | | Dadukou District, Ba'nan District | Chongqing | 2022 | 800 m (2,600 ft) | 660 m (2,170 ft) | cable-stayed | 8-lane highway Line 18 | 29.4312°N 106.5081°E |
| Yudong Bridge | | Dadukou District, Ba'nan District | Chongqing | 2008 | 1,541.6 m (5,058 ft) | double 260 m (850 ft) | beam | G210 Line 2 | 29.402556°N 106.496611°E |
| New Baishatuo Yangtze River Bridge 新白沙沱长江大桥 | | Dadukou District, Jiangjin District | Chongqing | 2018 | 5,320 m (17,450 ft) | 432 m (1,417 ft) | combined cable-stayed and truss | Yugui Railway, Yuchang HSR and Xingluo railway | 29.353714°N 106.425267°E |
| Diwei Bridge | | Dadukou District, Jiangjin District | Chongqing | 2004 | 734.8 m (2,411 ft) | 345 m (1,132 ft) | cable-stayed | 2-lane highway | 29.344667°N 106.404722°E |
| Outer-ring Jiangjin Bridge | | Jiulongpo District, Jiangjin District | Chongqing | 2009 | 1,172 m (3,845 ft) | 436 m (1,430 ft) | cable-stayed | G93 G5001 | 29.263444°N 106.321222°E |
| Dingshan Bridge | | Jiulongpo District, Jiangjin District | Chongqing | 2013 | 897 m (2,943 ft) | 464 m (1,522 ft) | cable-stayed | G212(reserved for Line 5) | 29.274743°N 106.287242°E |
| Jijiang Yangtze River Bridge 几江长江大桥 | | Jiangjin District | Chongqing | 2016 | 1,738 m (5,702 ft) | 600 m (2,000 ft) | suspension | 6-lane highway | 29.294°N 106.261°E |
| Jiangjin Bridge 江津长江大桥 | | Jiangjin District | Chongqing | 1997 | 1,360 m (4,460 ft) | 240 m (790 ft) | beam | G348 | 29.263806°N 106.252528°E |
| Youxi Yangtze River Bridge 油溪长江大桥 | | Jiangjin District | Chongqing | 2024 | 1,178 m (3,865 ft) | 760 m (2,490 ft) | suspension | G9909 Chongqing S49 | 29.225081°N 106.168616°E |
| Jiangjin Baisha Yangtze River Bridge 江津白沙长江大桥 | | Jiangjin District | Chongqing | 2022 | 1,290 m (4,230 ft) | 590 m (1,940 ft) | suspension | 6-lane highway | |
| Yongchuan Yangtze River Bridge 永川长江大桥 | | Jiangjin District, Yongchuan District | Chongqing | 2014 | 1,895.8 m (6,220 ft) | 608 m (1,995 ft) | cable-stayed | Chongqing S53 | 29.041667°N 105.888333°E |
| Bosideng Bridge | | Hejiang County | Sichuan | 2013 | 840.89 m (2,758.8 ft) | 530 m (1,740 ft) | arch | G93 | 28.892182°N 105.879717°E |
| Hejiang Bridge | | Hejiang County | Sichuan | 2021 | 1,420 m (4,660 ft) | 507 m (1,663 ft) | arch | S438 | 28.82420°N 105.83038°E |
| Kangbo Yangtze River Bridge | | Hejiang County | Sichuan | 2013 | 1,695 m (5,561 ft) | 420 m (1,380 ft) | cable-stayed | G93 | 28.84491°N 105.7992°E |
| Shenbicheng Yangtze River Bridge 神臂城长江大桥 | | Hejiang County | Sichuan | 2023 | 1,329.9 m (4,363 ft) | 520 m (1,710 ft) | cable-stayed | S552 | |
| Huangyi Bridge 黄舣长江大桥 | | Luzhou | Sichuan | 2014 | 1,223 m (4,012 ft) | 520 m (1,710 ft) | cable-stayed | G4215 | 28.895259°N 105.548094°E |
| Taian Bridge 泰安长江大桥 | | Luzhou | Sichuan | 2008 | 1,573 m (5,161 ft) | 270 m (890 ft) | cable-stayed | G321 | 28.878326°N 105.526116°E |
| Luzhou Yangtze River Second Bridge 沙茜长江大桥 | | Luzhou | Sichuan | 2023 | 2,189 m (7,182 ft) | 576 m (1,890 ft) | dual-layer suspension | 2F: 6-lane highway 1F: 2-lane highway and Luzhou rail transit | |
| Guojiao Yangtze River Bridge 国窖长江大桥 | | Luzhou | Sichuan | 2012 | 1,190 m (3,900 ft) | 248 m (814 ft) | extradosed | 6-lane highway | 28.888139°N 105.455556°E |
| Luzhou Bridge 泸州长江大桥 | | Luzhou | Sichuan | 1982 | 1,252.5 m (4,109 ft) | triple 170 m (560 ft) | beam | G246 | 28.868494°N 105.440806°E |
| Linyu Yangtze River Bridge 邻玉长江大桥 | | Luzhou | Sichuan | 2023 | 1,763 m (5,784 ft) | double 425 m (1,394 ft) | cable-stayed | 6-lane highway and Luzhou rail transit | |
| Luzhou Railway Bridge 泸州长江铁路大桥 | | Luzhou | Sichuan | 2004 | 1,445 m (4,741 ft) | 144 m (472 ft) | beam | Longhuang railway | 28.772813°N 105.35476°E |
| Longna Expressway Yangtze River Bridge 隆纳高速长江大桥 | | Luzhou | Sichuan | 2000 | 1,408 m (4,619 ft) | 252 m (827 ft) | beam | G76 | 28.764941°N 105.336644°E |
| Jiang'an Bridge 江安长江大桥 | | Jiang'an County | Sichuan | 2007 | 1,092.8 m (3,585 ft) | 252 m (827 ft) | beam | 4-lane highway | 28.729526°N 105.082659°E |
| Nanxi Xianyuan Yangtze River Bridge 南溪仙源长江大桥 | | Yibin | Sichuan | 2019 | 1,508 m (4,948 ft) | 572 m (1,877 ft) | cable-stayed | S437 | 28.76781°N 104.65386°E |
| Nanxi Bridge | | Yibin | Sichuan | 2012 | 1,295.59 m (4,250.6 ft) | 820 m (2,690 ft) | suspension | G93 | 28.783694°N 104.945694°E |
| Lingang Bridge | | Yibin | Sichuan | 2023 | 1,732 m (5,682 ft) | 522 m (1,713 ft) | cable-stayed | highway Chuannan ICR | 28.7789°N 104.7261°E |
| Yanpingba Yangtze River Bridge 盐坪坝长江大桥 | | Yibin | Sichuan | 2021 | 866 m (2,841 ft) | 480 m (1,570 ft) | cable-stayed | 8-lane highway | |
| Yibin Yangtze River Bridge 宜宾长江大桥 | | Yibin | Sichuan | 2008 | 931.31 m (3,055.5 ft) | 460 m (1,510 ft) | cable-stayed | G547 | 28.764494°N 104.656386°E |

=== Jinsha ===
| Name | Image | Location | Province | Opened | Total length | Longest Span | Type | Carries | Coordinates |
|---|---|---|---|---|---|---|---|---|---|
| Jinsha River Rongzhou Bridge 金沙江戎州大桥 | | Yibin | Sichuan eastern | 2004 | 505 m (1,657 ft) | 260 m (850 ft) | arch | road | 28.7667°N 104.6386°E |
| Jinsha River Nanmen Bridge 金沙江南门大桥 | | Yibin | Sichuan eastern | 1990 | 387 m (1,270 ft) | 260 m (850 ft) | arch | road | 28.7639°N 104.625°E |
| Yibin Jinsha River Railway Bridge 宜宾金沙江铁路大桥 | | Yibin | Sichuan eastern | 1968 | 400 m (1,300 ft) | 176 m (577 ft) | beam | Yigong Railway | 28.7592°N 104.6172°E |
| Jinsha River Zhongba Bridge 金沙江中坝大桥 | | Yibin | Sichuan eastern | 2003 | 427 m (1,401 ft) | 252 m (827 ft) | cable-stayed | road | 28.7558°N 104.6108°E |
| Yibin Jinsha River Road-Railway Bridge 宜宾金沙江公铁大桥 | | Yibin | Sichuan eastern | 2019 | 1,874.9 m (6,151 ft) | 336 m (1,102 ft) | arch | road and Chenggui HSR | 28.7287°N 104.5851°E |
| Jinsha River Tianchi Bridge 金沙江天池大桥 | | Yibin | Sichuan eastern | 2011 | 653 m (2,142 ft) | 220 m (720 ft) | beam | road | 28.7069°N 104.5766°E |
| Mamingxi Bridge 马鸣溪大桥 | | Yibin | Sichuan eastern | 1979 | 245 m (804 ft) | 150 m (490 ft) | deck arch | S311 | 28.7011°N 104.5567°E |
| Puhe Jinsha River Bridge 普和金沙江大桥 | | Yibin | Sichuan eastern | 2020 | 268 m (879 ft) | 180 m (590 ft) | beam | G353 | 28.6957°N 104.5487°E |
| Yukun Expressway Jinsha River Bridge 渝昆高速金沙江大桥 | | Yibin | Sichuan eastern | 2005 | 1,712 m (5,617 ft) | 249 m (817 ft) | beam | G85 | 28.6889°N 104.5233°E |
| Shuifu Jinsha River Bridge水富金沙江大桥 | | Yibin, Zhaotong | Sichuan; Yunnan | 1958 | unknown | unknown | truss | Neikun Railway | 28.6975°N 104.4211°E |
| Xiangjiaba Bridge向家坝金沙江大桥 | | Yibin, Zhaotong | Sichuan; Yunnan | 2007 | 443 m (1,453 ft) | 170 m (560 ft) | beam | road | 28.6402°N 104.4094°E |
| Yunchuan Jinsha River Bridge云川金沙江大桥 | | Yibin, Zhaotong | Sichuan; Yunnan | 2015 | 718 m (2,356 ft) | 228 m (748 ft) | beam | road | 28.6138°N 103.9903°E |
| Nan'an Jinsha River Bridge南岸金沙江大桥 | | Yibin, Zhaotong | Sichuan; Yunnan | 2001 | 310 m (1,020 ft) | 150 m (490 ft) | arch | G213 | 28.6625°N 103.87°E |
| Huixi Jinsha River Bridge桧溪金沙江大桥 | | Leibo, Yongshan | Sichuan; Yunnan | 2006 | unknown | 158 m (518 ft) | beam | road | |
| Xiluodu Bridge溪洛渡大桥 | | Liangshan, Zhaotong | Sichuan; Yunnan | 2005 | unknown | unknown | beam | S301 | 28.2417°N 103.6753°E |
| Yueliangwan Bridge月亮湾大桥 | | Liangshan, Zhaotong | Sichuan; Yunnan | 2020 | unknown | 465 m (1,526 ft) | suspension | road | |
| Tongyang Bridge通阳大桥 | | Liangshan, Zhaotong | Sichuan; Yunnan | 2008 | 500 m (1,600 ft) | 180 m (590 ft) | arch | S208 | 27.5317°N 103.1997°E |
| Duiping Bridge对坪桥 | | Liangshan, Zhaotong | Sichuan; Yunnan | 2018 | unknown | 280 m (920 ft) | arch | road | |
| Fengjiaping Bridge冯家坪桥 | | Butuo, Qiaojia | Sichuan; Yunnan | 2018 | unknown | 260 m (850 ft) | arch | S464 | |
| Baihetan Bridge白鹤滩大桥 | | Ningnan, Qiaojia | Sichuan; Yunnan | 2010s | unknown | unknown | beam | road | |
| Baihetan Jinsha River Bridge白鹤滩金沙江大桥 | | Ningnan, Qiaojia | Sichuan; Yunnan | 2010s | unknown | 656 m (2,152 ft) | suspension | road | |
| Jindong Bridge金东大桥 | | Huidong, Kunming | Sichuan; Yunnan | 2018 | 730 m (2,400 ft) | unknown | suspension | road | |
| Wudongde Bridge 乌东德大桥 | | Huidong, Luquan | Sichuan; Yunnan | 2015 | ~400 m (1,300 ft) | 90 m (300 ft) | beam | road | 26.352°N 102.5971°E |
| Hongmendu Bridge 洪门渡大桥 | | Huidong, Luquan | Sichuan; Yunnan | 2019 | 240 m (790 ft) | unknown | beam | road | |
| Jiaopingdu Bridge 皎平渡大桥 | | Huili, Luquan | Sichuan; Yunnan | 2020 | 220 m (720 ft) | unknown | beam | G245 | 26.2928°N 102.3831°E |
| Longjiedu Bridge 龙街渡大桥 | | Yuanmou | Yunnan | 2020 | 220 m (720 ft) | unknown | beam | road | |
| Yuzha Bridge 鱼鲊大桥 | | Huili, Panzhihua | Sichuan southern | 2014 | 398 m (1,306 ft) | 180 m (590 ft) | beam | G108 | 26.3683°N 101.9268°E |
| Xipan Expressway Jinsha River Bridge 西攀高速公路金沙江大桥 | | Yanbian, Panzhihua | Sichuan southern | 2008 | 637 m (2,090 ft) | 324 m (1,063 ft) | cable-stayed | G5 | 26.5728°N 101.8519°E |
| Sanduizi Bridge 三堆子大桥 | | Yanbian, Panzhihua | Sichuan southern | 2019 | 200 m (660 ft) | unknown | beam | road | |
| Chengkun Railway Bridge 成昆铁路金沙江大桥 | | Yanbian, Panzhihua | Sichuan southern | 1970 | 390 m (1,280 ft) | 192 m (630 ft) | beam | Chengkun Railway | 26.5814°N 101.8364°E |
| Eguang Railway Panzhihua Jinsha River Bridge 峨广铁路攀枝花金沙江大桥 | | Yanbian, Panzhihua | Sichuan southern | 2020 | 208 m (682 ft) | unknown | cable-stayed | Eguang Railway | |
| Qinglongshan Bridge 青龙山大桥 | | Panzhihua | Sichuan southern | 2014 | 862 m (2,828 ft) | 230 m (750 ft) | beam | G4216 | 26.6042°N 101.795°E |
| Luoguo Bridge 倮果大桥 | | Panzhihua | Sichuan southern | 1995 | 208 m (682 ft) | 160 m (520 ft) | arch | S214 | 26.6011°N 101.7942°E |
| New Midi Bridge 新密地大桥 | | Panzhihua | Sichuan southern | 2011; 2013 (Note: The upstream span of the New Midi Bridge opened in 2011 and the downstream span opened in 2013) | 296 m (971 ft) | 182 m (597 ft) | arch | road and mine pipeline | 26.5758°N 101.7497°E |
| Guanyinyan water diversion Midi pipeline bridge | | Panzhihua | Sichuan southern | 2020 | 150 m (490 ft) | unknown | suspension | water pipeline | |
| Bingcaogang Bridge 炳草岗大桥 | | Panzhihua | Sichuan southern | 2001 | 516.3 m (1,694 ft) | 200 m (660 ft) | combined cable-stayed and truss | road | 26.5756°N 101.7038°E |
| Dukou Suspension Bridge 渡口吊桥 | | Panzhihua | Sichuan southern | 1965 | 180 m (590 ft) | unknown | suspension | gas pipeline | |
| Dukou Bridge 渡口大桥 | | Panzhihua | Sichuan southern | 2005 | 385.88 m (1,266.0 ft) | 170 m (560 ft) | arch | S310 | 26.557°N 101.697°E |
| Hehuachi Bridge 荷花池大桥 | | Panzhihua | Sichuan southern | 1976 | 252.2 m (827 ft) | 110 m (360 ft) | arch | road | 26.5686°N 101.6627°E |
| Guanyinyan water diversion Hehuachi pipeline bridge | | Panzhihua | Sichuan southern | 2019 | 130 m (430 ft) | unknown | arch | water pipeline | |
| Jinsha River railway bridge of PIS cold mill factory 攀钢冷轧厂专用线金沙江大桥 | | Panzhihua | Sichuan southern | 1995 | 168 m (551 ft) | unknown | beam | railway | 26.5856°N 101.6544°E |
| Guanyinyan water diversion Xinzhuang pipeline bridge | | Panzhihua | Sichuan southern | 2018 | 150 m (490 ft) | unknown | arch | water pipeline | |
| Xinzhuang Bridge 新庄大桥 | | Panzhihua | Sichuan southern | 1972 | 323.7 m (1,062 ft) | 146 m (479 ft) | arch | S310 | 26.5855°N 101.6546°E |
| Lipan Expressway Dashuijing Bridge 丽攀高速公路大水井大桥 | | Panzhihua | Sichuan southern | 2014 | 475 m (1,558 ft) | 230 m (750 ft) | beam | G4216 | 26.5903°N 101.62°E |
| Fala Bridge 法拉大桥 | | Panzhihua | Sichuan southern | 2005 | 233.74 m (766.9 ft) | 190 m (620 ft) | box girder | road | 26.5876°N 101.6002°E |
| Guanyinyan water diversion Taojiadu pipeline bridge | | Panzhihua | Sichuan southern | 2019 | 140 m (460 ft) | unknown | arch | water pipeline | |
| Baoding Bridge 宝鼎大桥 | | Panzhihua | Sichuan southern | 1982 | 392 m (1,286 ft) | 170 m (560 ft) | box girder | road | 26.5966°N 101.5711°E |
| Lipan Expressway Zhuangshang Bridge 丽攀高速公路庄上大桥 | | Panzhihua | Sichuan southern | 2014 | 370 m (1,210 ft) | 180 m (590 ft) | beam | G4216 | 26.5925°N 101.4981°E |
| Guanyinyan water diversion Guanyinyan pipeline bridge | | Panzhihua | Sichuan southern | 2017 | 108 m (354 ft) | unknown | arch | water pipeline | |
| Panzhihua Guanyinyan Bridge 观音岩大桥 | | Panzhihua | Sichuan southern | 2005 | unknown | 114 m (374 ft) | arch | road | 26.5314°N 101.4470°E |
| Jinjiang Bridge 金江大桥 | | Yongsheng | Yunnan | 2012 | 325 m (1,066 ft) | unknown | beam | S220 G554 | 26.1842°N 100.5936°E |
| Taoyuan Jinsha River Bridge涛原金沙江大桥 | | Yongsheng | Yunnan | 2020 | 636 m (2,087 ft) | unknown | suspension | S47 | |
| Maguaidan Bridge 麻拐旦大桥 | | Heqing | Yunnan | unknown | 250 m (820 ft) | 170 m (560 ft) | suspension | road | 26.4831°N 100.4192°E |
| Zhongjiang Bridge 中江大桥 | | Heqing | Yunnan | 2005 | 225 m (738 ft) | 138 m (453 ft) | suspension | road | 26.4958°N 100.4125°E |
| Longkaikou Bridge龙开口大桥 | | Heqing | Yunnan | unknown | unknown | unknown | beam | road | 26.7183°N 100.3914°E |
| Jinlong Bridge 金龙桥 | | Lijiang | Yunnan | 1936 (Note: The Jinlong Bridge was first built in 1880. It was destroyed in a flood in 1935 and rebuilt in 1936.) | 116 m (381 ft) | 90 m (300 ft) | simple suspension | pedestrian | 26.7828°N 100.3858°E |
| Jin'an Bridge arch bridge 金安桥 | | Lijiang | Yunnan | 1982 | 186 m (610 ft) | 110 m (360 ft) | arch | S308 | 26.7964°N 100.4297°E |
| Ping'an Bridge 平安大桥 | | Lijiang | Yunnan | unknown | unknown | unknown | arch | road | 26.7986°N 100.44°E |
| Jin'an Bridge | | Lijiang | Yunnan | 2020 | 1,681 m (5,515 ft) | 1,386 m (4,547 ft) | suspension | G4216 | 26.82°N 100.44°E |
| New Shudi Bridge 新树底大桥 | | Lijiang | Yunnan | 2010 | 179.6 m (589 ft) | 120 m (390 ft) | beam | S991 | 27.0064°N 100.4378°E |
| Ahai Bridge 阿海大桥 | | Lijiang | Yunnan | unknown | 270 m (890 ft) | unknown | arch | road | 27.335°N 100.5067°E |
| Genangdu Bridge 革囊渡大桥 | | Lijiang | Yunnan | unknown | 216 m (709 ft) | 150 m (490 ft) | beam | road | 27.6042°N 100.4436°E |
| Liyuan Bridge 梨园大桥 | | Shangri-La, Yulong | Yunnan | unknown | unknown | unknown | arch | road | 27.6869°N 100.2897°E |
| Jihong Bridge 继红桥 | | Shangri-La, Yulong | Yunnan | 1971 | 150 m (490 ft) | 75 m (246 ft) | arch | road | 27.1314°N 100.0552°E |
| unknown | | Shangri-La, Yulong | Yunnan | unknown | 350 m (1,150 ft) | 200 m (660 ft) | suspension | road, very narrow | 27.0511°N 100.0772°E |
| Songyuan Bridge松园大桥 | | Shangri-La, Yulong | Yunnan | 1996 | unknown | 170 m (560 ft) | arch | G214 | 27.005°N 100.0714°E |
| Jinjiang Bridge金江大桥 | | Shangri-La, Yulong | Yunnan | 2006 | unknown | 200 m (660 ft) | suspension | road | 27.1528°N 99.8244°E |
| Gelan Bridge格兰大桥 | | Shangri-La, Yulong | Yunnan | 2017 | unknown | 200 m (660 ft) | suspension | road | |
| Mugao Bridge 木高大桥 | | Shangri-La, Yulong | Yunnan | 2021 | unknown | unknown | arch | road | |
| Qizong Bridge其宗大桥 | | Shangri-La, Weixi | Yunnan | 1989 | unknown | 95 m (312 ft) | cable-stayed | S225 S226 | 27.576°N 99.5286°E |
| Qichun Bridge 其春大桥 | | Shangri-La, Weixi | Yunnan | 2017 | unknown | unknown | beam | road | |
| Chelige Bridge车里格桥 | | Shangri-La, Dêqên | Yunnan | 2021 | unknown | 100 m (330 ft) | suspension | road | |
| Wujing Bridge五境大桥 | | Shangri-La, Dêqên | Yunnan | unknown | unknown | unknown | arch | road | |
| Tuoding ropeway bridge 拖顶索道桥 | | Shangri-La, Dêqên | Yunnan | 2019 | unknown | unknown | ropeway | road | |
| Tuoding Bridge拖顶大桥 | | Shangri-La, Dêqên | Yunnan | 2019 | unknown | 100 m (330 ft) | beam | road | |
| Jiangdong Bridge江东大桥 | | Shangri-La, Dêqên | Yunnan | 2020 | unknown | unknown | arch | road | |
| Jiangdongnong Bridge江东农大桥 | | Shangri-La, Dêqên | Yunnan | 2021 | unknown | unknown | suspension | road | |
| G214 Xiangde Highway Jinsha River Bridge214国道香德公路金沙江大桥 | | Garzê, Dêqên | Sichuan, Yunnan | 2013 | unknown | 130 m (430 ft) | arch | G214 | |
| Helong Bridge 贺龙桥 | | Garzê, Dêqên | Sichuan, Yunnan | unknown | unknown | unknown | arch | G214 | 28.1711°N 99.3894°E |
| Fulong Bridge伏龙桥 | | Garzê, Dêqên | Sichuan, Yunnan | 1959 | unknown | 108 m (354 ft) | suspension | ~~road~~ | |
| Jinshawan Bridge金沙湾大桥 | | Garzê, Dêqên | Sichuan, Yunnan | unknown | unknown | unknown | suspension | road | |
| Quzong Bridge曲宗大桥 | | Garzê, Dêqên | Sichuan, Yunnan | unknown | unknown | unknown | arch | road | 28.3528°N 99.2296°E |
| Rongxuecun Bridge绒学村桥 | | Garzê, Dêqên | Sichuan, Yunnan | unknown | unknown | unknown | suspension | road | 28.485°N 99.1872°E |
| Yinduba Bridge因都坝大桥 | | Garzê, Dêqên | Sichuan, Yunnan | 2006 | unknown | 90 m (300 ft) | arch | road | 28.6061°N 99.1664°E |
| unknown | | Garzê, Dêqên | Sichuan, Yunnan | unknown | unknown | unknown | simple suspension | pedestrian | 28.7464°N 99.1269°E |
| unknown | | Garzê, Dêqên | Sichuan, Yunnan | unknown | unknown | unknown | simple suspension | pedestrian | |
| unknown | | Garzê, Dêqên | Sichuan, Yunnan | unknown | unknown | unknown | simple suspension | pedestrian | 28.8897°N 99.1175°E |
| unknown | | Garzê, Dêqên | Sichuan, Yunnan | unknown | unknown | unknown | suspension | road | 29.2288°N 99.1153°E |
| unknown | | Garzê, Chamdo | Sichuan, Tibet | unknown | unknown | unknown | suspension | road | 29.3039°N 99.0656°E |
| Sarixi suspension bridge 萨日西吊桥 | | Garzê, Chamdo | Sichuan, Tibet | unknown | unknown | unknown | suspension | pedestrian | |
| Biji suspension bridge 比吉吊桥 | | Garzê, Chamdo | Sichuan, Tibet | unknown | unknown | 130 m (430 ft) | suspension | road | |
| Suoduoxi suspension bridge 索多西吊桥 | | Garzê, Chamdo | Sichuan, Tibet | unknown | unknown | unknown | suspension | pedestrian | |
| Xulongneng suspension bridge 需隆弄吊桥 | | Garzê, Chamdo | Sichuan, Tibet | unknown | unknown | unknown | suspension | pedestrian | 29.4839°N 99.0581°E |
| Jiaobixi suspension bridge 角比西吊桥 | | Garzê, Chamdo | Sichuan, Tibet | unknown | unknown | 140 m (460 ft) | suspension | road | |
| Luoyi suspension bridge 洛益吊桥 | | Garzê, Chamdo | Sichuan, Tibet | unknown | unknown | unknown | suspension | pedestrian | |
| New Zhubalong Bridge 新竹巴龙金沙江大桥 | | Garzê, Chamdo | Sichuan, Tibet | 2007 | unknown | unknown | beam | G318 | 29.7697°N 99.0097°E |
| Old Zhubalong Bridge 老竹巴龙金沙江大桥 | | Garzê, Chamdo | Sichuan, Tibet | 1964 | unknown | unknown | beam | pedestrian (Note: The Old Zhubalong Bridge has been closed to vehicular traffic.) | 29.7747°N 99.0108°E |
| Zilongda suspension bridge 自龙达吊桥 | | Garzê, Chamdo | Sichuan, Tibet | unknown | unknown | 150 m (490 ft) | suspension | road | |
| Nizeng suspension bridge 尼增吊桥 | | Garzê, Chamdo | Sichuan, Tibet | unknown | unknown | unknown | suspension | pedestrian | 29.9361°N 99.0606°E |
| Lawasuo Bridge 拉哇索桥 | | Garzê, Chamdo | Sichuan, Tibet | unknown | unknown | unknown | simple suspension | pedestrian | |
| unknown | | Garzê, Chamdo | Sichuan, Tibet | unknown | unknown | unknown | simple suspension | pedestrian | |
| unknown | | Garzê, Chamdo | Sichuan, Tibet | unknown | unknown | unknown | simple suspension | pedestrian | 30.7442°N 98.9608°E |
| unknown | | Garzê, Chamdo | Sichuan, Tibet | unknown | unknown | unknown | simple suspension | pedestrian | 31.2141°N 98.6235°E |
| unknown | | Garzê, Chamdo | Sichuan, Tibet | unknown | unknown | unknown | simple suspension | pedestrian | 31.3198°N 98.8186°E |
| unknown | | Garzê, Chamdo | Sichuan, Tibet | unknown | unknown | unknown | simple suspension | pedestrian | 31.4356°N 98.8398°E |
| New Gangtuo Bridge 新岗托大桥 | | Garzê, Chamdo | Sichuan, Tibet | unknown | unknown | unknown | beam | G317 | 31.6240°N 98.5931°E |
| Gangtuo Bridge 岗托大桥 | | Garzê, Chamdo | Sichuan, Tibet | 1974 | 140 m (460 ft) | 70 m (230 ft) | arch | road | 31.6256°N 98.5906°E |
| unknown | | Garzê, Chamdo | Sichuan, Tibet | unknown | unknown | unknown | suspension | pedestrian | 31.6921°N 98.5571°E |
| Dengmanusangba Bridge 邓玛奴桑巴桥 | | Garzê, Chamdo | Sichuan, Tibet | 1988 | 150 m (490 ft) | unknown | suspension | road | 32.4603°N 97.9963°E |
| unknown | | Garzê, Yushu | Sichuan, Qinghai | unknown | unknown | unknown | suspension | road | 32.6339°N 97.5399°E |

=== Tongtian ===
| Name | Image | Location | Province | Opened | Total length | Longest Span | Type | Carries | Coordinates |
|---|---|---|---|---|---|---|---|---|---|
| G214 Tongtian River Bridge214国道通天河大桥 | | Chindu County, Yushu County | Qinghai (Yushu) | 2003 | | | beam | G214 | 33.0068°N 97.2479°E |
| Qingkang Highway Tongtian River Bridge青康公路通天河大桥 | | Chindu County, Yushu County | Qinghai (Yushu) | 1963 | 150 m (490 ft) | 50 m (160 ft) | arch | road | 33.0077°N 97.2464°E |
| Zhongda Tongtian River Suspension Bridge仲达通天河索桥 | | Chindu County, Yushu County | Qinghai (Yushu) | | | | simple suspension | pedestrian | 33.2497°N 97.01184°E |
| Zhongda Tongtian River Bridge仲达通天河大桥 | | Chindu County, Yushu County | Qinghai (Yushu) | 2012 | | | beam | road | 33.2649°N 97.0163°E |
| unknown | | Chindu County, Yushu County | Qinghai (Yushu) | | | | beam | road | 33.3390°N 96.9780°E |
| unknown | | Chindu County, Yushu County | Qinghai (Yushu) | | | | simple suspension | pedestrian | 33.3293°N 96.8730°E |
| unknown | | Chindu County, Yushu County | Qinghai (Yushu) | | | | suspension | road | 33.3205°N 96.8236°E |
| unknown | | Chindu County, Yushu County | Qinghai (Yushu) | | | | suspension | road | 33.5538°N 96.6218°E |
| unknown | | Chindu County, Yushu County | Qinghai (Yushu) | | | | simple suspension | pedestrian | 33.5968°N 96.591°E |
| unknown | | Qumarlêb County, Zhidoi County | Qinghai (Yushu) | | | | suspension | road | 33.7383°N 96.2381°E |
| Qumarlêb Tongtian River Bridge曲麻莱通天河大桥 | | Qumarlêb County, Zhidoi County | Qinghai (Yushu) | 2012 (Note: The Qumarlêb Tongtian River Bridge, a rigid frame bridge that built in 2012, replaced a beam bridge built in 1989.) | 600 m (2,000 ft) | 100 m (330 ft) | beam | S308 | 34.0361°N 95.8255°E |

=== Tuotuo ===
| Name | Image | Location | Province | Opened | Total length | Longest Span | Type | Carries | Coordinates |
|---|---|---|---|---|---|---|---|---|---|
| G109 Tuotuo River Bridge109国道沱沱河大桥 | | Tanggula Town (Golmud) | Qinghai (Haixi) | 1958 (Note: The G109 Tuotuo River Bridge, first built in 1958, was rebuilt in 1987 and 2002.) | | | beam | G109 | 34.2193°N 92.4435°E |
| Qinghai-Tibet Railway Tuotuo River Bridge青藏铁路长江源特大桥 | | Tanggula Town (Golmud) | Qinghai (Haixi) | 2006 (Note: The Qinghai-Tibet Railway Tuotuo River Bridge was completed in 2002 and opened to rail traffic in 2006.) | 1,389.6 m (4,559 ft) | | beam | Qinghai–Tibet Railway | 34.222°N 92.4358°E |

=== Nanjing Yangtze River Bridges ===
- Nanjing Yangtze River Bridge, also known as First Nanjing Yangtze Bridge (opened 1968, 160 m longest span)
- Nanjing Baguazhou Yangtze River Bridge, also known as Second Nanjing Yangtze River Bridge (opened 1997, 628 m longest span)
- Nanjing Dashengguan Yangtze River Bridge, also known as Third Nanjing Yangtze Bridge (opened 2005, 648 m longest span)
- Nanjing Qixiashan Yangtze River Bridge, also known as Fourth Nanjing Yangtze River Bridge (opened 2012, 1,418m longest span)
- Nanjing Jiangxinzhou Yangtze River Bridge, also known as Fifth Nanjing Yangtze River Bridge (opened 2020, 600 m longest span)
- Nanjing Xianxin Yangtze River Bridge (opened 2023, 1,760 m longest span)

== Bridges and tunnels under construction ==
=== Chang Jiang ===
| Name | Location | Expected opening | Total length | Longest span | Type | Carries | Coord. |
|---|---|---|---|---|---|---|---|
| Longtan Yangtze River Bridge 龙潭长江大桥 | Yizheng & Nanjing, Jiangsu | 2024 | 5,715 m (18,750 ft) | 1,560 m (5,120 ft) | suspension | G9904 | |
| Nanjing Xinshengwei Yangtze River Bridge 南京新生圩长江大桥 | Nanjing, Jiangsu | 2023 | 2,920 m (9,580 ft) | 1,760 m (5,770 ft) | suspension | road | |
| Nanjing Yanziji Yangtze River Tunnel 南京燕子矶长江隧道 | Nanjing, Jiangsu | 2022 | 3,845 m (12,615 ft) | - | tunnel | 6-lane road | |
| Shangyuanmen tunnel 上元门过江通道 | Nanjing, Jiangsu | 2027 | 14,000 m (46,000 ft) | - | tunnel | Huning ICR, Yangtze River corridor, etc. | |
| Gongan Bridge 公安长江大桥 | Jingzhou, Hubei | 2018 | 2,015.9 m (6,614 ft) | 518 m (1,699 ft) | cable-stayed | Shashi-Gongan Hwy; Jingzhou-Yueyang Railroad | 30.068333°N 112.333056°E, |
| Huangjuetuo Yangtze River Bridge 黄桷沱长江大桥 | Jiangbei & Nan'an, Chongqing | 2027 | 1,260 m (4,130 ft) | 765 m (2,510 ft) | suspension | road and Line 18 | |

=== Upstream sections ===
| Name | Location | Expected opening | Total length | Main span | Type | Carries | Coord. |
|---|---|---|---|---|---|---|---|
| New Hulukou Bridge 新葫芦口大桥 | Liangshan, Sichuan; Zhaotong, Yunnan | 2016 | 959 m (3,146 ft) | 656 m (2,152 ft) | suspension | road | 26.9714°N 102.8918°E |
| Jindong Bridge 金东大桥 | Liangshan, Sichuan; Kunming, Yunnan | 2016 | 941 m (3,087 ft) | 730 m (2,400 ft) | suspension | road | 26.5099°N 103.0406°E |
| Hemenkou Bridge 河门口大桥 | Liangshan, Sichuan; Kunming, Yunnan | 2017 | 522 m (1,713 ft) | 240 m (790 ft) | rigid frame | road | 26.3074°N 102.6344°E |
| Second Chengkun Railway Bridge 成昆二线金沙江大桥 | Panzhihua, Sichuan | 2020 | | | cable-stayed | Second Chengkun Railway | 26.6037°N 101.8139°E |
| G214 New Tongtian River Bridge; 214国道新通天河大桥 | Yushu, Qinghai | ? | ~800 m (2,600 ft) | | rigid frame | road | 33.0055°N 97.249°E |

== Planned bridges ==
| Name | Location | Expected opening | Total length | Main span | Type | Carries | Coord. |
|---|---|---|---|---|---|---|---|
| Wuxue Bridge | Wuxue, Hubei & Yangxin, Hubei | 2018 | 4,331 m (14,209 ft) | 1,328 m (4,357 ft) | cable-stayed | Macheng-Yangxin Hwy | 29.840278°N 115.506111°E |
| Chibi Bridge | Honghu & Chibi, Hubei | 2018 | 4,557 m (14,951 ft) | 720 m (2,360 ft) | cable-stayed | S214 | 29.8525°N 113.578333°E |

== Abandoned ==
| Name | Location | opened | closed | Total length | Main span | Type | Carries | Coord. |
|---|---|---|---|---|---|---|---|---|
| Baishatuo Railway Bridge | Dadukou District and Jiangjin District, Chongqing | 1959 | 2019 | 820 m (2,690 ft) | 4*80 m (260 ft) | truss | Chuanqian Railway (Note: The second track on the Baishatuo Yangtze River Railway Bridge was added in 1978.) | 29.353714°N 106.425267°E |
| Hulukou Bridge 葫芦口大桥 | Ningnan County, Sichuan and Qiaojia County, Yunnan | 1998 | 2021 | 160 m (520 ft) | unknown | arch | S212 S310 S303 | 26.9644°N 102.89°E |
| Midi Bridge 密地大桥 | Panzhihua, Sichuan | 1969 | 2014 (Note: The Midi Bridge closed in 2014.) | 284 m (932 ft) | 181 m (594 ft) | arch | ~~road~~ | 26.5759°N 101.7492°E |

== See also ==
- Yangtze River power line crossings
- List of bridges in China
- List of longest suspension bridge spans
- List of longest cable-stayed bridge spans
- List of longest arch bridge spans
- List of longest continuous truss bridge spans
- List of highest bridges in the world
- List of tallest bridges in the world
