= Qingshan Yangtze River Bridge =

Cable-stayed bridge, China

Qingshan Yangtze River Bridge 青山长江大桥
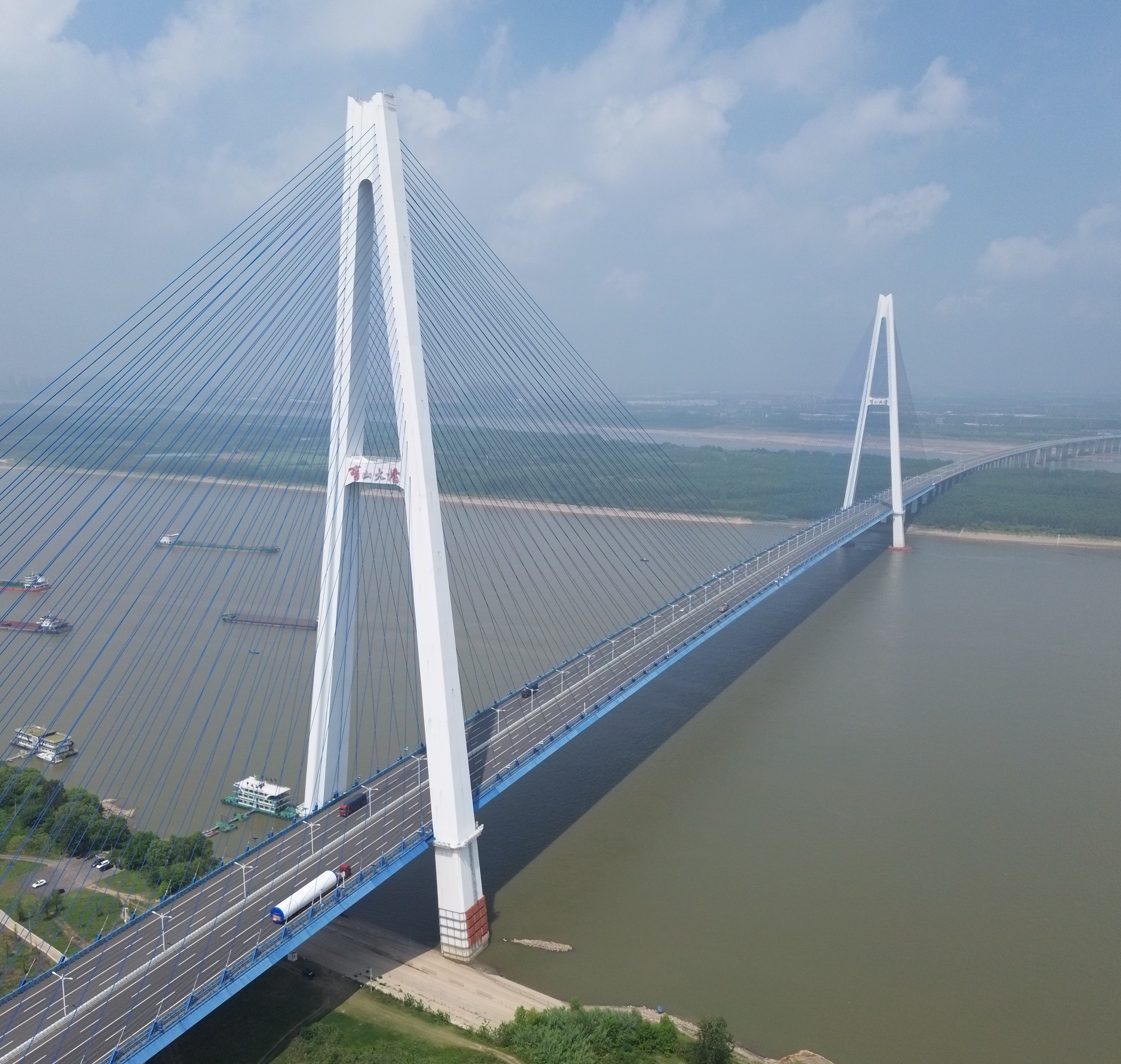
- Coordinates: 30°40′47″N 114°28′00″E
- Carries: Hubei S40 Wuhan Fourth Ring Road
- Crosses: Yangtze River
- Locale: Wuhan, Hubei, China

Characteristics
- Design: Cable-stayed
- Material: Steel, concrete
- Width: 48 m (157 ft)
- Height: 279.5 m (917 ft) (north tower); 271.5 m (891 ft) (south tower)
- Longest span: 938 m (3,077 ft)
- No. of lanes: 8

History
- Construction start: 23 December 2015
- Inaugurated: 30 April 2021

Location
- Interactive map of Qingshan Yangtze River Bridge

The Qingshan Yangtze River Bridge (Chinese: 青山长江大桥 is a cable-stayed bridge in Wuhan, Hubei province, it crosses the Yangtze river between the Tianxingzhou Yangtze River Bridge upstream and the Yangluo Yangtze River Bridge downstream.

When it opened, it is one of the longest cable-stayed bridge with a 938-metre (3,077 ft) main spans.

== See also ==
- Bridges and tunnels across the Yangtze River
- List of bridges in China
- List of longest cable-stayed bridge spans
- List of tallest bridges in the world
