= Lijiatuo Yangtze River Bridge =

Lijiatuo Yangtze River Bridge 重庆李家沱长江大桥
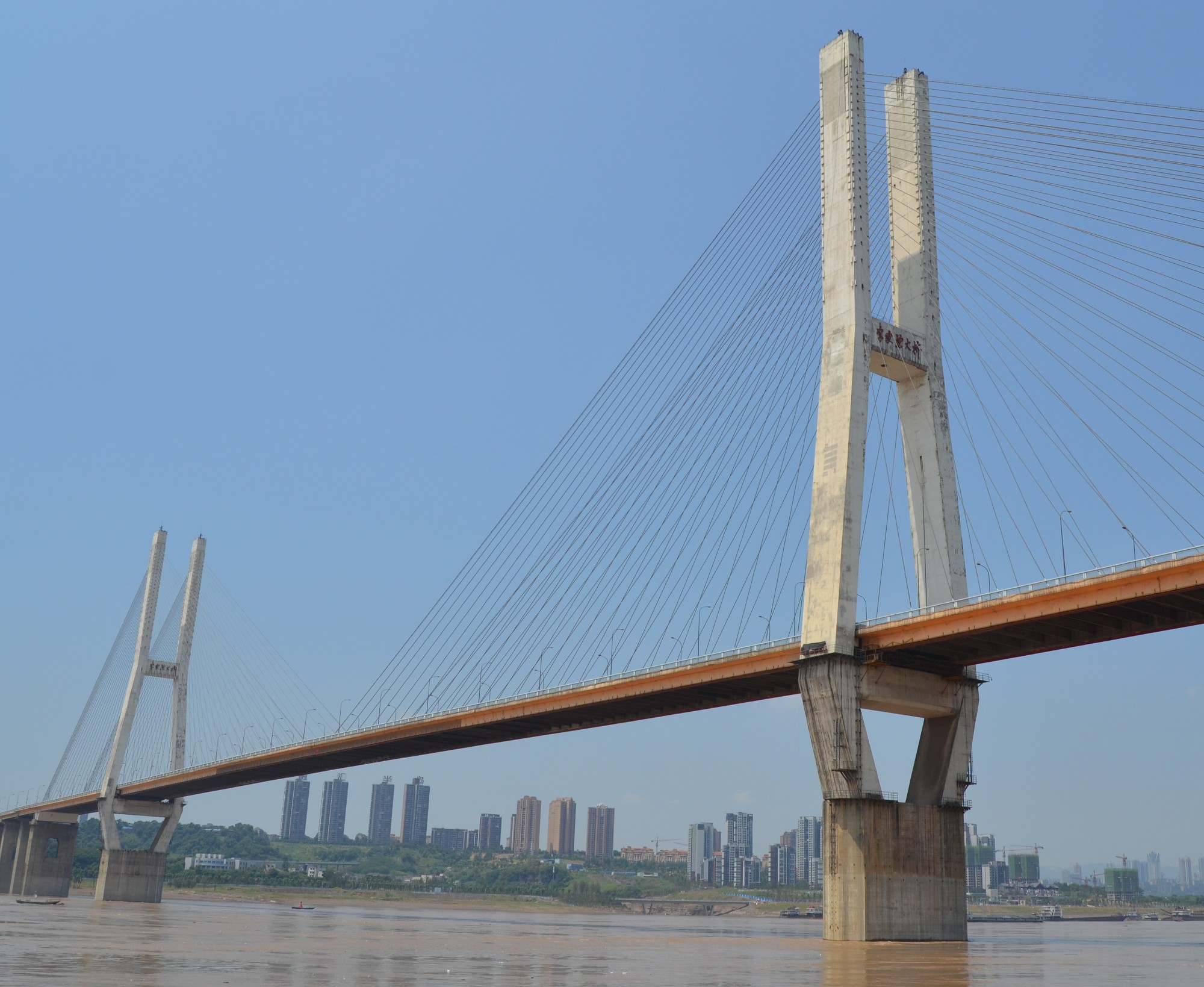
- Coordinates: 29.479472°N 106.528444°E
- Carries: Jinlong Road/Hongguang Avenue
- Crosses: Yangtze River
- Locale: Chongqing, China

Characteristics
- Design: Cable-stayed
- Total length: 1,288 metres (4,226 ft)
- Longest span: 444 metres (1,457 ft)

History
- Opened: 1995

Location
- Interactive map of Lijiatuo Yangtze River Bridge

The Lijiatuo Yangtze River Bridge is a cable-stayed bridge over the Yangtze River in Chongqing, China. Completed in 1995, it has a main span of 444 metres (1,457 ft), placing it among the longest cable-stayed bridges in the world. The bridge carries four lanes of traffic between the Banan District south of the Yangtze River and the Jiulongpo District to the north.

In the summer of 2013, the bridge was closed for five days as its steel cables were replaced. In December 2014, the city government approved another replacement of the bridge's cables.

== See also ==
- List of largest cable-stayed bridges
- Yangtze River bridges and tunnels
