= Diwei Bridge =

Diwei Bridge 地维大桥
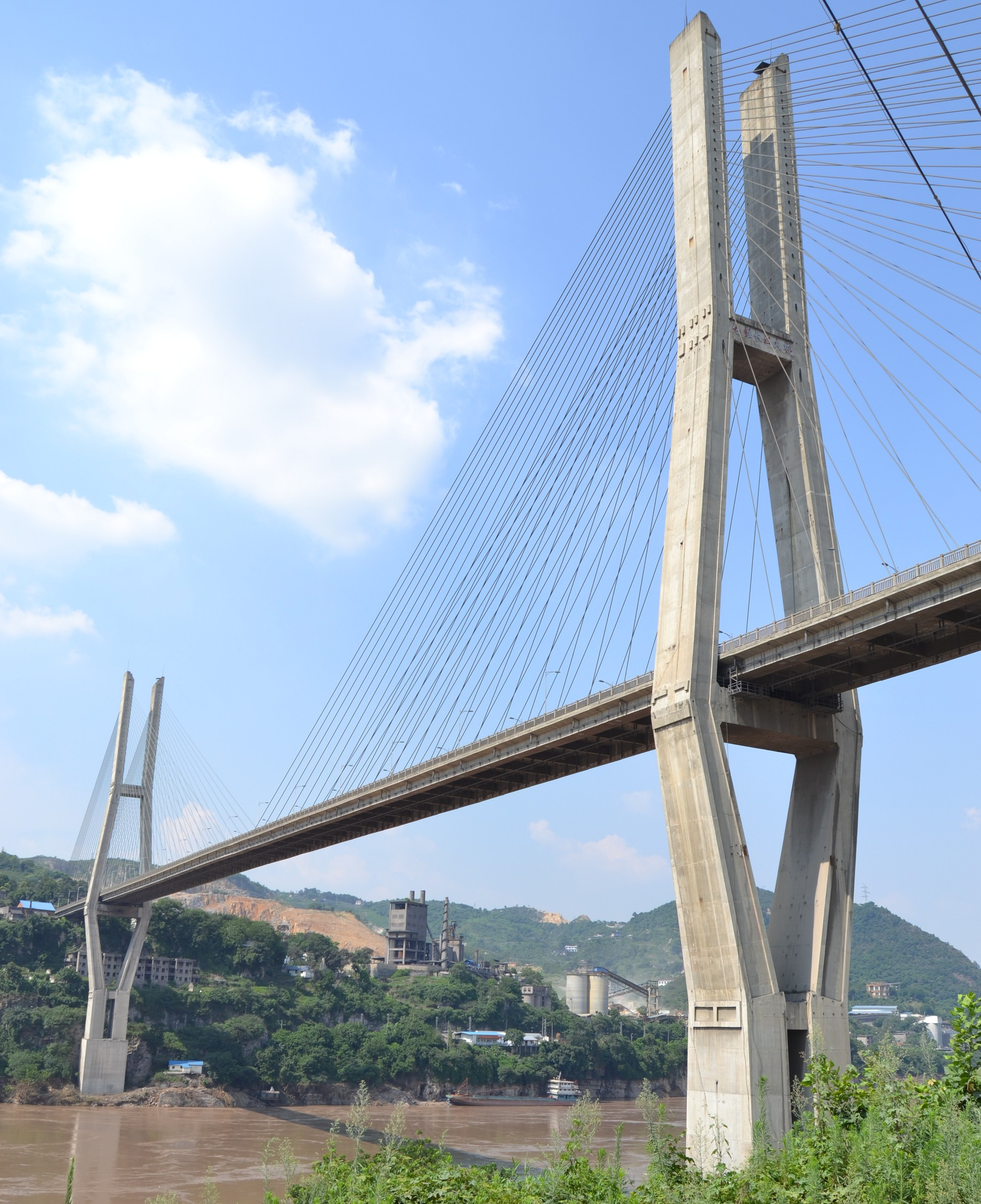
- Coordinates: 29.344667°N 106.404722°E
- Crosses: Yangtze River
- Locale: Chongqing, China

Characteristics
- Design: Cable-stayed
- Total length: 737 metres (2,418 ft)
- Longest span: 345 metres (1,132 ft)

History
- Opened: 2008

Location
- Interactive map of Diwei Bridge

The Diwei Bridge is a cable-stayed bridge which crosses the Yangtze River in Chongqing, China. Completed in 2008, it has a main span of 345 metres (1,132 ft). The bridge carries road of traffic between the Jiangjin District south of the Yangtze River and the Dadukou District to the north.

== See also ==
- Yangtze River bridges and tunnels
