= Masangxi Bridge =

Masangxi Bridge 重庆马桑溪长江大桥
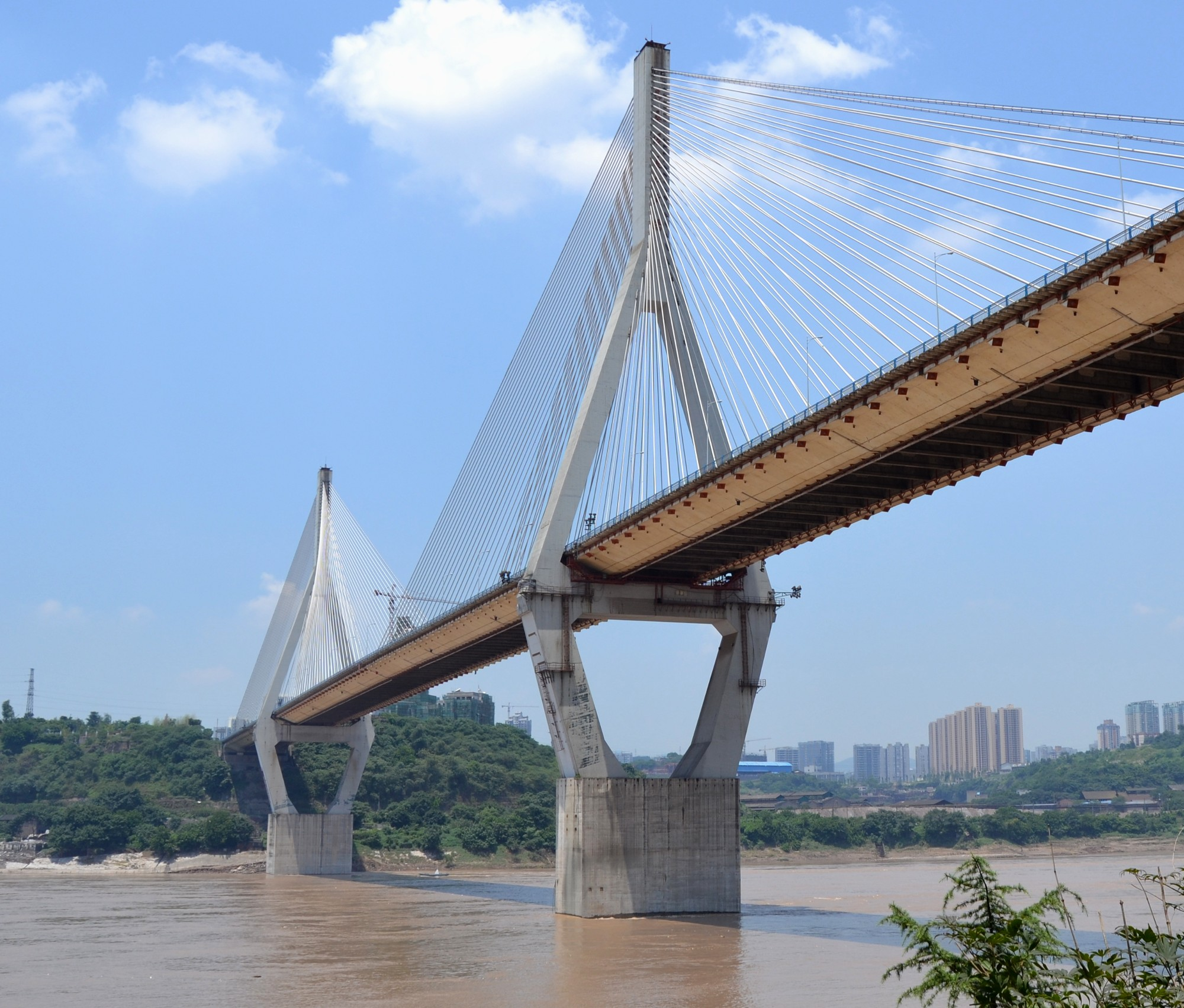
- Coordinates: 29.457667°N 106.494194°E
- Carries: G75 Lanhai Expressway
- Crosses: Yangtze River
- Locale: Chongqing, China

Characteristics
- Design: Cable-stayed
- Total length: 11,104 metres (36,430 ft)
- Width: 30.6 metres (100 ft)
- Longest span: 360 metres (1,180 ft)

History
- Opened: 2001

Location
- Interactive map of Masangxi Bridge

The Masangxi Bridge is a cable-stayed bridge which crosses the Yangtze River in Chongqing, China. Completed in 2001, it has a main span of 360 metres (1,180 ft) and is 30.6 metres (100 ft) wide. The bridge carries 6 lanes of traffic on the G75 Lanzhou–Haikou Expressway between the Banan District east of the Yangtze River and the Dadukou District to the west.

== See also ==
- Yangtze River bridges and tunnels
