= List of bridges in Hubei =

This is a list of bridges in Hubei, China.

== Bridges ==
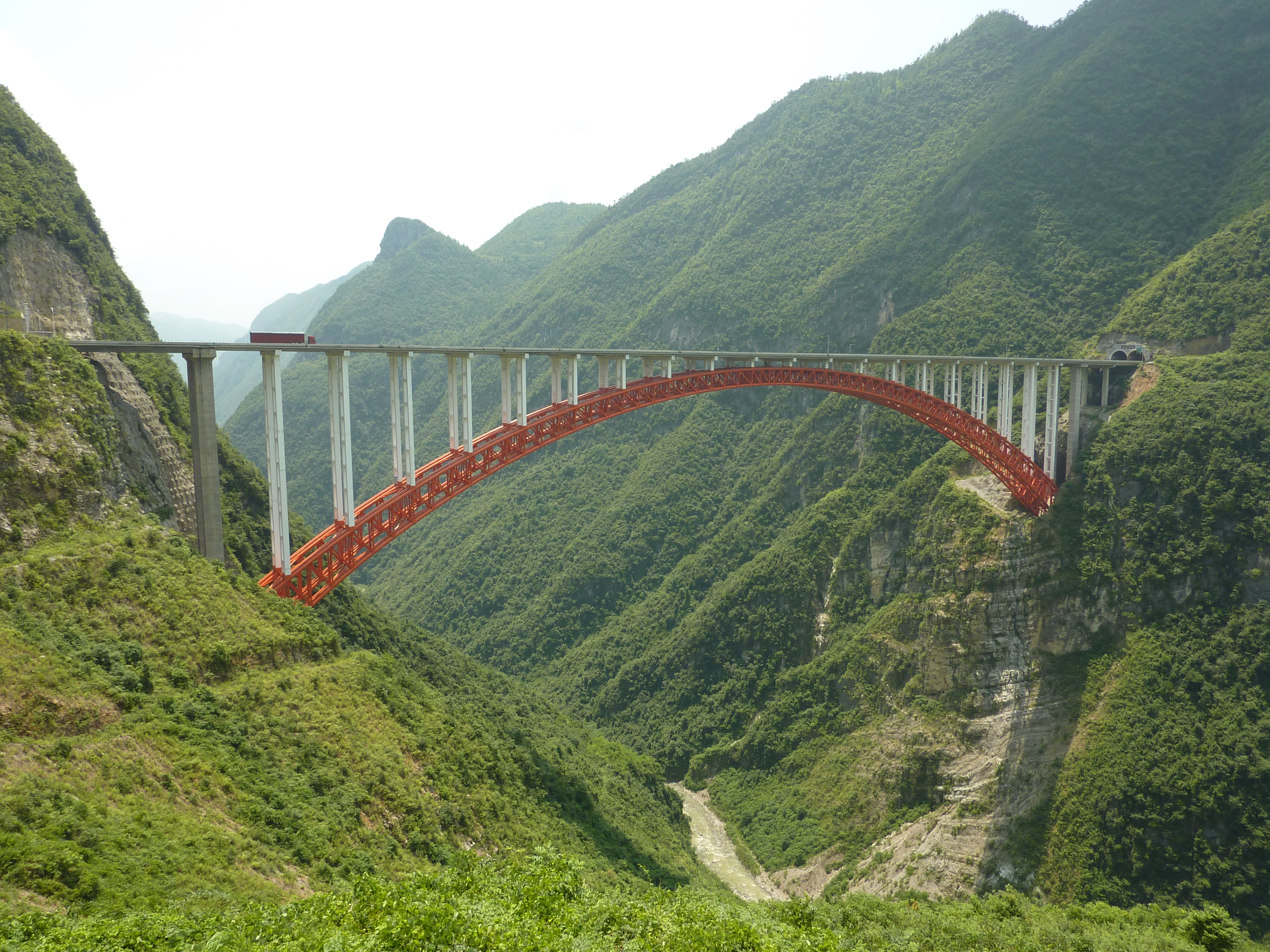
The Zhijinghe River Bridge the highest arch bridge on Earth

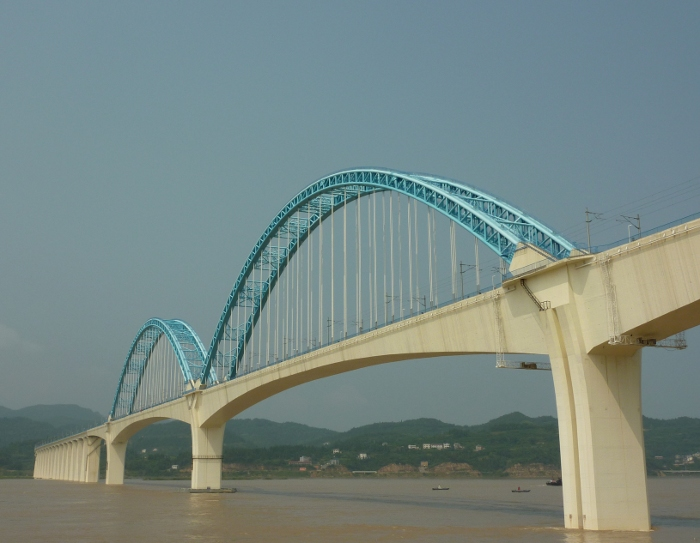
The Yichang Railway Bridge over the Yangtze River

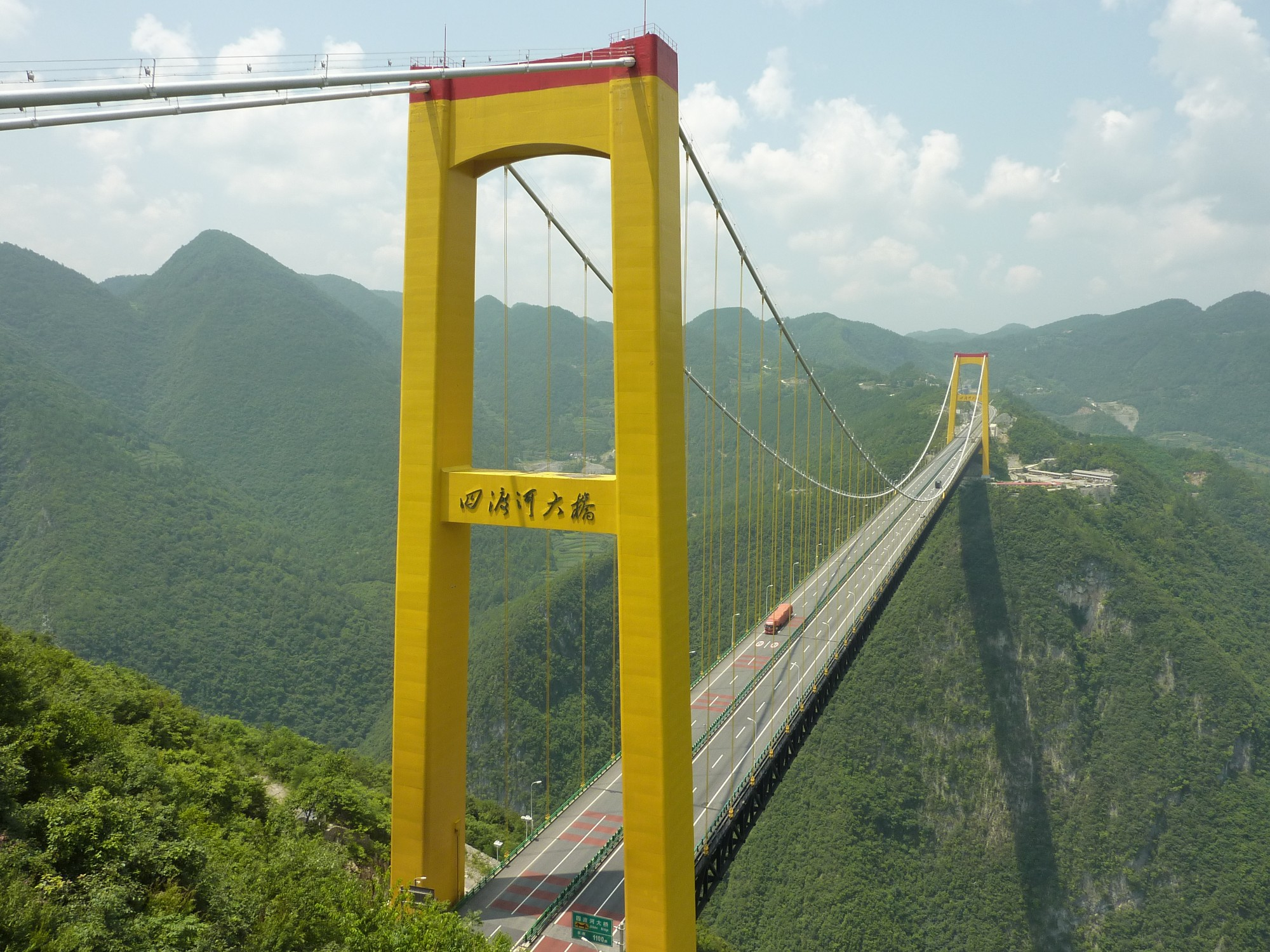
The Sidu River Bridge the highest bridge on Earth

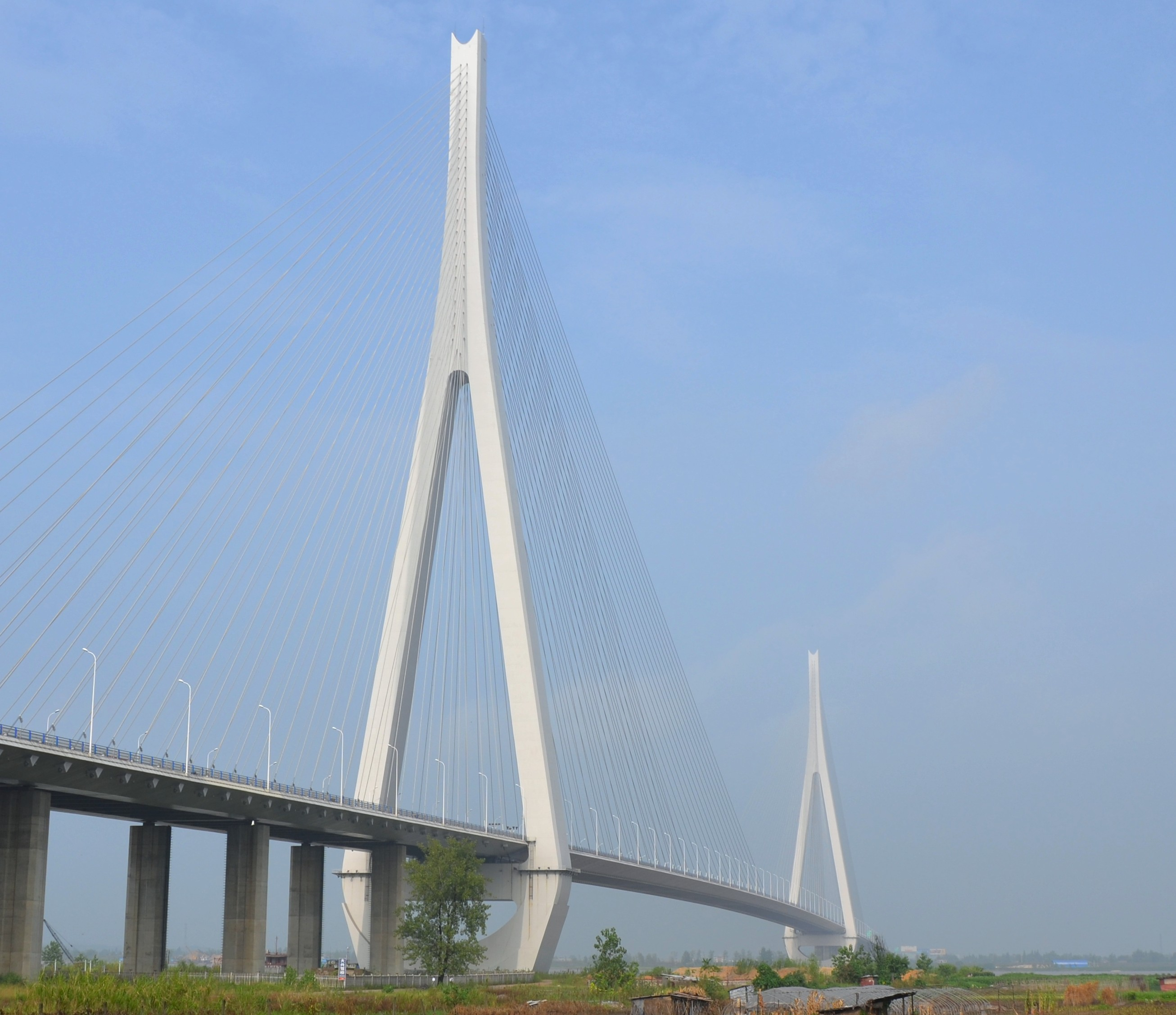
The Edong Bridge over the Yangtze River

- Badong Yangtze River Bridge
- Baishazhou Bridge
- Changfeng (Wuhan) Bridge
- E’dong Bridge
- Ehuang Bridge
- Erqi Bridge
- Huanggang Yangtze River Bridge under construction
- Huangshi Bridge
- Jing Yang Bridge
- Jingyue Bridge
- Jingzhou Bridge
- Jiujiang Bridge
- Jiujiang Fuyin Expressway Bridge
- Junshan Bridge
- Longtanhe Bridge
- Mashuihe River Viaduct
- Nanlidu Bridge
- Qing Jiang Bridge
- Qingchuan Bridge
- Second Wuhan Yangtze River Bridge
- Shennongxi Highway Bridge under construction
- Sidu River Bridge
- Tianxingzhou Bridge
- Tieluoping Bridge
- Weijiazhou Bridge
- Wuhan Yangtze River Bridge
- Xiangfan Hanjiang Bridge under construction
- Xiaohe River Bridge
- Xiling Bridge
- Yangluo Bridge
- Yesanhe Bridge
- Yichang Bridge
- Yichang Railway Bridge
- Yiling Bridge
- Yingwuzhou Bridge
- Yun Yang Hanjiang Bridge
- Zhicheng Bridge
- Zhijinghe River Bridge
- Zigui Bridge

== See also ==
- List of bridges in China
- Yangtze River bridges and tunnels
