= Yangluo Yangtze River Bridge =

Yangluo Bridge 武汉阳逻长江大桥
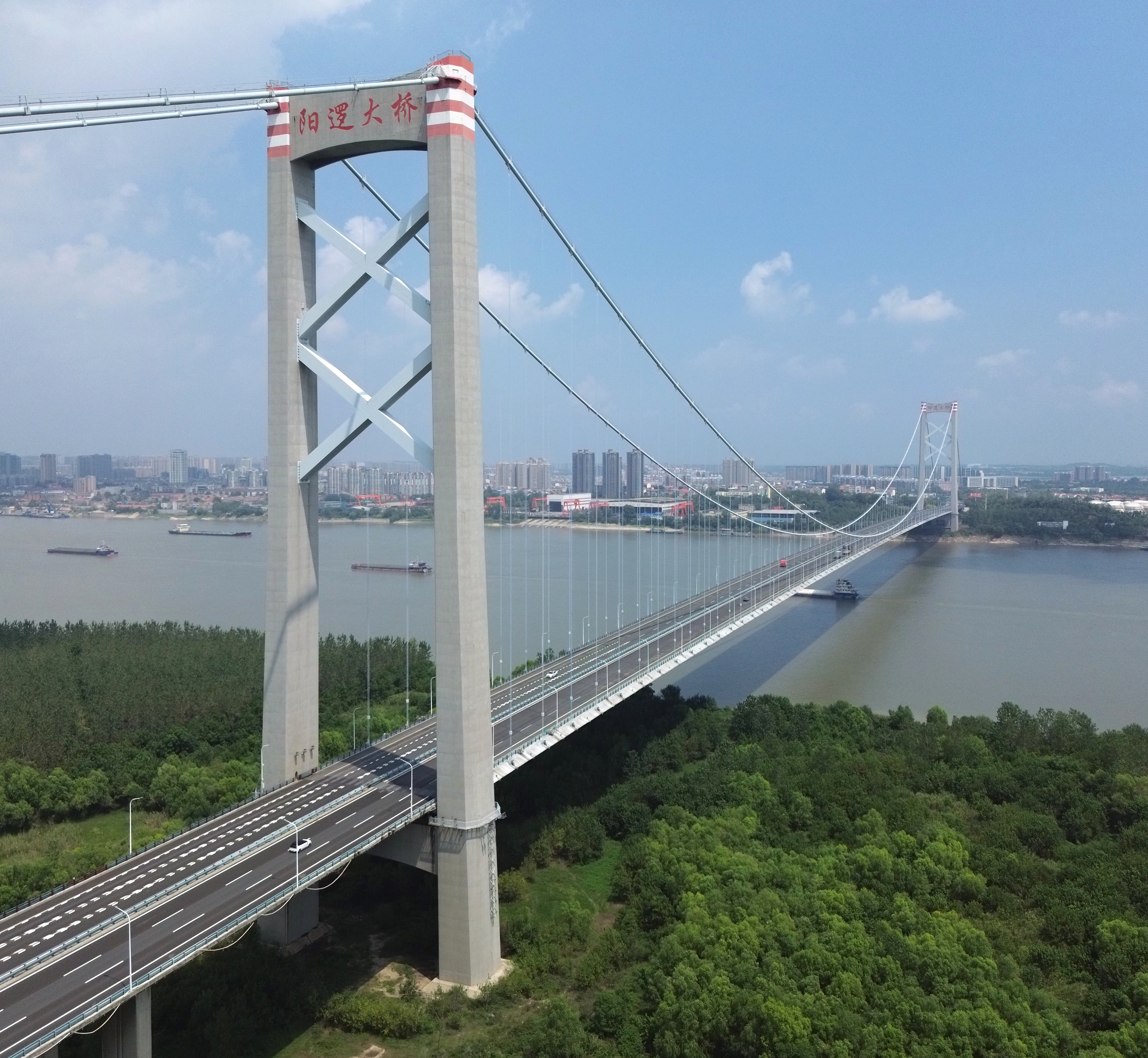
- Coordinates: 30.62416°N 114.557778°E
- Carries: G70 Fuzhou–Yinchuan Expressway; G4201 Wuhan Ring Expressway
- Crosses: Yangtze River
- Locale: Wuhan, Hubei, China
- Maintained by: Wuhan Rao Cheng Highway Management Division

Characteristics
- Design: Suspension bridge
- Total length: 2,725 m (8,940 ft)
- Width: 38.5 m (126 ft)
- Height: 169.8 m (557 ft) (south pylon); 163.3 m (536 ft) (north pylon)
- Longest span: 1,280 m (4,200 ft)

History
- Construction start: November 4, 2003
- Construction cost: $240 million USD
- Opened: December 26, 2007

Location
- Interactive map of Yangluo Bridge

The Yangluo Yangtze River Bridge (Chinese: 武汉阳逻长江大桥) is a suspension bridge over the Yangtze River in Wuhan, Hubei, China. With a main span of 1,280 metres (4,200 ft), at its opening it was tied with the Golden Gate Bridge as the ninth longest suspension bridge in the world. The bridge carries the G70 Fuzhou–Yinchuan Expressway and G4201 Wuhan Ring Expressway over the Yangtze River and provides easy access to both sides of the river as part of a larger plan to promote development in the eastern portion of the city. Construction on the bridge began on November 4, 2003, and it opened to traffic on December 26, 2007.

== History ==
The Yangluo Bridge was the fourth bridge constructed over the Yangtze in Wuhan. The first was the Wuhan Yangtze River Bridge, known locally as the First Bridge, built in 1957. This remained the only land link across the river for the next four decades and it became increasingly congested as the city grew. To alleviate the crowding on the bridge and promote further development in the city, Wuhan's government began an ambitious program in the early 1990s to upgrade the city's infrastructure by building new bridges and expressways around the city. Two further road crossings near the centre of the city, the Second Wuhan Yangtze River Bridge and the Baishazhou Bridge, were completed in 1995 and 2000 respectively. The Yangluo Bridge is located about 25 kilometres (16 mi) downstream from these bridges. Together with the 10 km of new expressway constructed concurrently the bridge was the final major portion of the G4201 Wuhan Ring Expressway.

== Design ==
The bridge was designed by the China Communications Construction Company and built with assistance from Dorman Long, a UK-based heavy-lift construction contractor. It has a total length of 1,970 metres (6,460 ft) with a main span of 1,280 metres (4,200 ft) and approach spans of 250 metres (820 ft) and 440 metres (1,440 ft) on the north and south banks respectively.

The bridge's deck is made of prefabricated concrete sections with an epoxy asphalt roadbed. It includes a 3-metre (9.8 ft) thick steel brace structure with girders at 14 metre intervals under the main deck to stiffen the bridge against the wind. The two main cables that support the deck are 83 centimetres (33 in) in diameter and each consists of 19,558 5.35 mm steel wires arranged in 154 strands. The portion of the cables over the shorter northern approach span include an additional eight strands to withstand the greater force exerted on them because of the smaller ratio in relation to the length of the main span. The north and south support towers for the main cables are 163.3 metres (536 ft) and 169.8 metres (557 ft) tall respectively and constructed of reinforced concrete with two prestressed concrete x-braces on each tower to provide lateral stiffening.

Coincidentally, the bridge's main span of 1,280 metres (4,200 ft) is exactly the same length as the famous Golden Gate Bridge in San Francisco, California that opened 70 years prior.

== See also ==
- Bridges and tunnels across the Yangtze River
- List of bridges in China
- List of longest suspension bridge spans
- List of tallest bridges
