= G5021 Shizhu–Chongqing Expressway =

Road in China

Shizhu–Chongqing Expressway
- 石柱－重庆高速公路
- Hangchang Expressway 石渝高速公路

Route information
- Auxiliary route of G50
- Length: 193.3 km (120.1 mi)

Major junctions
- West end: G5001 in Nan'an District, Chongqing
- East end: G50 in Shizhu Tujia Autonomous County, Chongqing

Location
- Country: China

Highway system
- National Trunk Highway System; Primary; Auxiliary; National Highways; Transport in China
← G5016	→ G55

The G5021 Shizhu–Chongqing Expressway (Chinese: 石柱—重庆高速公路), commonly referred to as the Shizhu Expressway (Chinese: 石渝高速公路), is an expressway in China that connects Shizhu Tujia Autonomous County to the city of Chongqing.

== History ==
Construction started in March 2010, with a four lane roadbed width of 24.5 meters, a design speed of 80 kilometers per hour, and an estimated design budget of 10.7 billion yuan. Among them, the Fufeng section had a total length of 56 kilometers, with an estimated investment of 5.5 billion yuan; the Fengshi section had a total length of 54 kilometers, with an estimated investment of 5.2 billion yuan. It was fully opened to traffic on 23 December 2013.

== Route ==
The expressway starts on the eastern section of the G5001 Chongqing Ring Expressway, passes through the districts of Nan'an, Banan, Fuling, and Fengdu County before terminating at the G50 Shanghai–Chongqing Expressway in Shizhu Tujia Autonomous County. The main route has a total length of 193.3 kilometers.

=== Branch ===
A branch expressway runs parallel to the Yangtze River which connects to Changshou District from a junction in Banan District. The branch has a total length of 16.6 kilometers.
