= G5013 Chongqing–Chengdu Expressway =

Expressway in China

Chongqing–Chengdu Expressway
- 重庆－成都高速公路
- Yurong Expressway 渝蓉高速公路

Route information
- Auxiliary route of G50
- Length: 251 km (156 mi) Length when complete.
- Existed: 25 December 2013–present

Major junctions
- East end: Shapingba District, Chongqing
- West end: Dazu County, Chongqing (current); Chengdu, Sichuan (when complete)

Location
- Country: China

Highway system
- National Trunk Highway System; Primary; Auxiliary; National Highways; Transport in China
| ← G5012 | → G5015 |

The Chongqing–Chengdu Expressway (Chinese: 重庆–成都高速公路), commonly referred to as the Yurong Expressway (Chinese: 渝蓉高速公路) and designated G5013, is a partially completed 251-kilometre-long expressway (156 mi) that connects the cities of Chongqing and Chengdu. The Chongqing section of the expressway opened on 25 December 2013.
