= G5012 Enshi–Guangyuan Expressway =

Expressway in China

Enshi–Guangyuan Expressway
- 恩施－广元高速公路
- Enguang Expressway 恩广高速公路

Route information
- Auxiliary route of G50

Major junctions
- West end: G75 in Guangyuan, Sichuan
- East end: G50 in Lichuan, Enshi Tujia and Miao, Hubei

Location
- Country: China

Highway system
- National Trunk Highway System; Primary; Auxiliary; National Highways; Transport in China
← G5011	→ G5013

The G5012 Enshi–Guangyuan Expressway (Chinese: 恩施—广元高速公路), commonly referred to as the Enguang Expressway (Chinese: 恩广高速公路), is an expressway in China that connects Enshi Tujia and Miao Autonomous Prefecture, Hubei to Guangyuan, Sichuan.

== Route ==
The expressway passes through the cities of Lichuan, Wanzhou, Dazhou, Bazhong and travels through the provinces of Hubei and Sichuan via the direct-administered municipality of Chongqing.

== Accident ==
At on 6 July 2023, a rockslide occurred on an elevated section between Dazhou and Wanzhou. The boulders washed away several bridge piers, causing part of the bridge deck to collapse. Two cars were damaged, and three people were slightly injured.
