= G5016 Yichang–Huarong Expressway =

Road in China

Yichang–Huarong Expressway
- 宜昌－华容高速公路
- Yihua Expressway 宜华高速公路

Route information
- Auxiliary route of G50
- Length: 169.43 km (105.28 mi)

Major junctions
- North end: G50 / Hubei S68 in Yidu, Yichang, Hubei
- South end: G56 in Huarong, Yueyang, Hunan

Location
- Country: China

Highway system
- National Trunk Highway System; Primary; Auxiliary; National Highways; Transport in China
← G5015	→ G5021

The G5016 Yichang–Huarong Expressway (Chinese: 宜昌—华容高速公路), commonly referred to as the Yihua Expressway (Chinese: 宜华高速公路), is an expressway in China that connects the cities of Yichang, Hubei to Yueyang, Hunan.

== Route ==
=== Hubei ===
Map of the S88 Yueyi Expressway in Hubei

In Hubei the expressway is also signposted as the S88 Yueyi Expressway.

==== Yichang to Songzi ====
The first section has a length of 50.72 km, passing through Zhicheng, Yaojiadian, Wuyanquan, Gaobazhou, Honghuatao and other towns. Construction started on 19 December 2012 and opened to traffic on 6 February 2016.

==== Songzi to Shishou ====
Also known as the Jiangnan Expressway, the second section has a length of 105.27 km. Construction started on 27 December 2010 and was opened to traffic on 18 December 2014.

=== Hunan ===
The Huarong section of the original S71 Huachang Expressway, also known as the Shihua Expressway, has a total length of 13.44 km. Construction started on 30 December 2009 and opened to traffic on 30 December 2013.
