= Anqing Yangtze River Bridge =

Anqing Yangtze River Bridge 安庆长江大桥
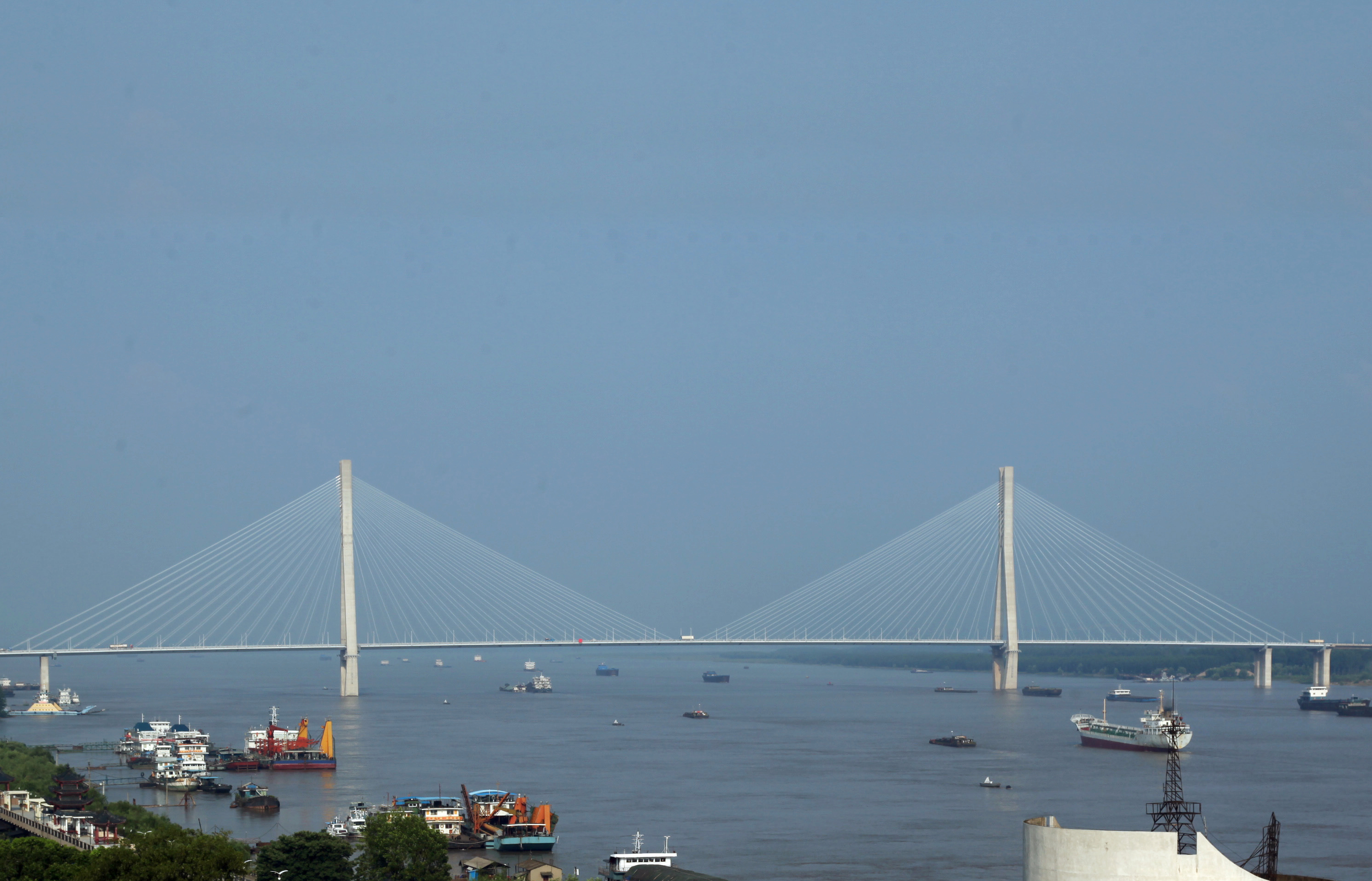
- Coordinates: 30.499056°N 117.071361°E
- Carries: 4-lanes of G50 Huyu Expressway
- Crosses: Yangtze River
- Locale: Anqing, Anhui, China

Characteristics
- Design: Cable-stayed
- Total length: 1,040 metres (3,410 ft); 5,985 metres (19,636 ft) (including approaches)
- Width: 31.2 metres (102 ft)
- Height: 185 metres (607 ft)
- Longest span: 510 metres (1,670 ft)

History
- Construction start: 2001
- Construction end: 2004
- Opened: 2004

Location
- Interactive map of Anqing Yangtze River Bridge

Anqing Yangtze River Bridge is a cable-stayed bridge spanning 1,040 metres (3,410 ft) over the Yangtze River at Anqing, Anhui Province in eastern China. The bridge is 31.2 metres (102 ft) wide and carries four lanes of traffic on the G50 Shanghai–Chongqing Expressway between Anqing north of the river and Dongzhi County in Chizhou prefecture to the south. The bridge opened on December 27, 2004 and was the 35th bridge across the Yangtze River between Yibin and Shanghai. The bridge required investment of ¥1.3174 billion.

The Anqing Yangtze River Bridge is located 164 km (102 mi) downstream from the Jiujiang Yangtze River Bridge and 96 km (60 mi) upstream from the Tongling Yangtze River Bridge.

Wu Bangguo wrote the calligraphy for the bridge's name inscription.

== See also ==
- List of largest cable-stayed bridges
- Yangtze River bridges and tunnels
- List of tallest bridges in the world
