= Zhongzhou Yangtze River Bridge =

Zhongzhou Yangtze River Bridge 忠州长江大桥
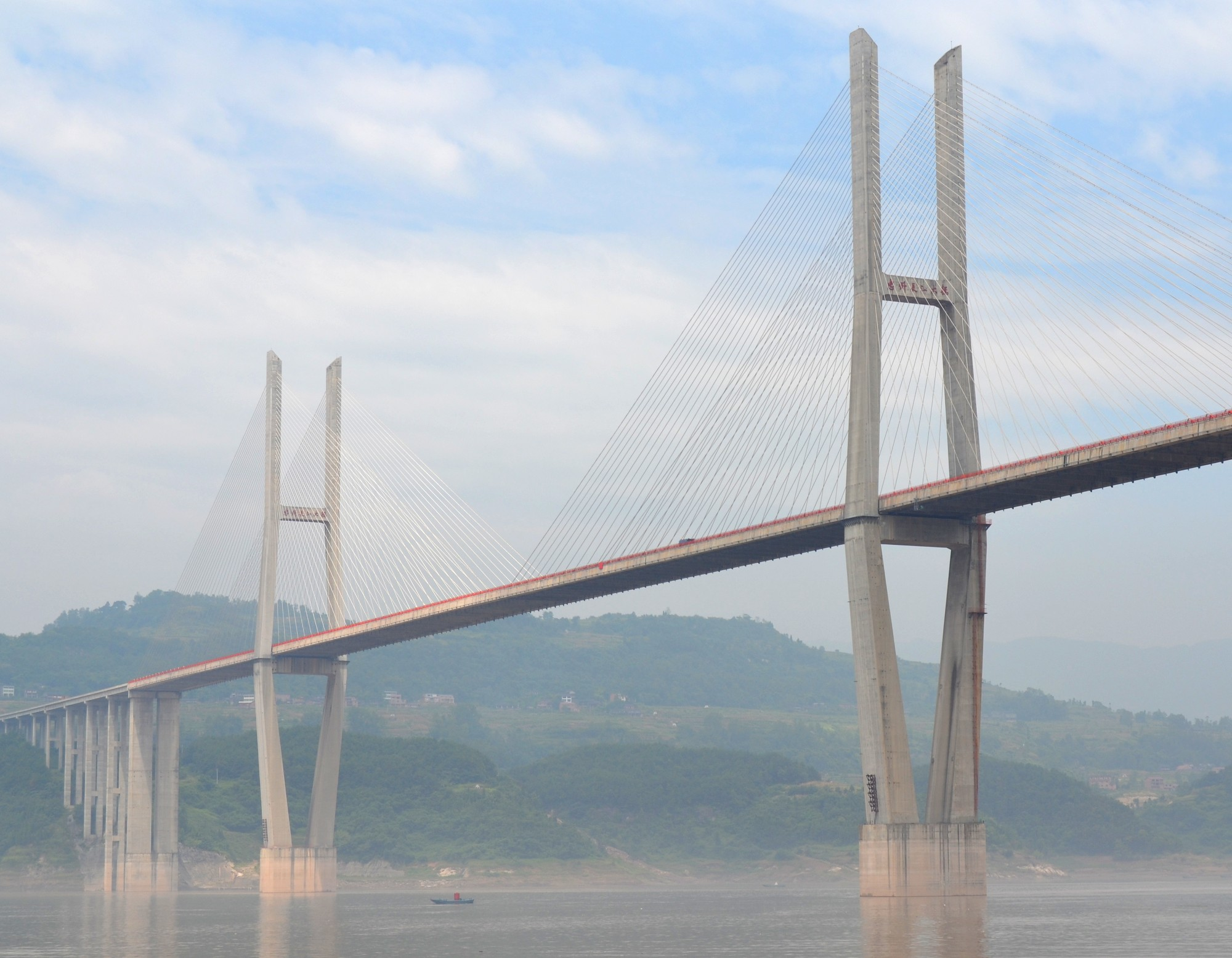
- Coordinates: 30.231944°N 108.005833°E
- Carries: G50 Huyu Expressway
- Crosses: Yangtze River
- Locale: Zhong County, Chongqing, China
- Other name: Zhongzhou Changjiang Bridge

Characteristics
- Design: Cable-stayed
- Total length: 2,174 metres (7,133 ft)
- Height: 247.5 metres (812 ft)
- Longest span: 460 metres (1,510 ft)
- Clearance above: 84–134 metres (276–440 ft)

History
- Opened: 2009

Location
- Interactive map of Zhongzhou Yangtze River Bridge

The Zhongzhou Yangtze River Bridge is a cable-stayed bridge over the Yangtze River in Zhong County of Chongqing, China. Completed in 2009, the bridge carries traffic on the G50 Shanghai–Chongqing Expressway.

With a main span of 460 metres (1,510 ft), the Zhongzhou Yangtze River Bridge was among the longest cable-stayed spans in the world when opened. The bridge was constructed 134 metres (440 ft) above the original river. The reservoir created by the Three Gorges Dam has increased the height of the water below the bridge and the clearance is reduced to 84 metres (276 ft) when the reservoir is at its peak.

== See also ==
- Bridges and tunnels across the Yangtze River
- List of bridges in China
- List of longest cable-stayed bridge spans
- List of tallest bridges in the world
