= G4202 Chengdu Ring Expressway =

Road in China

Chengdu Ring Expressway
- 成都绕城高速公路
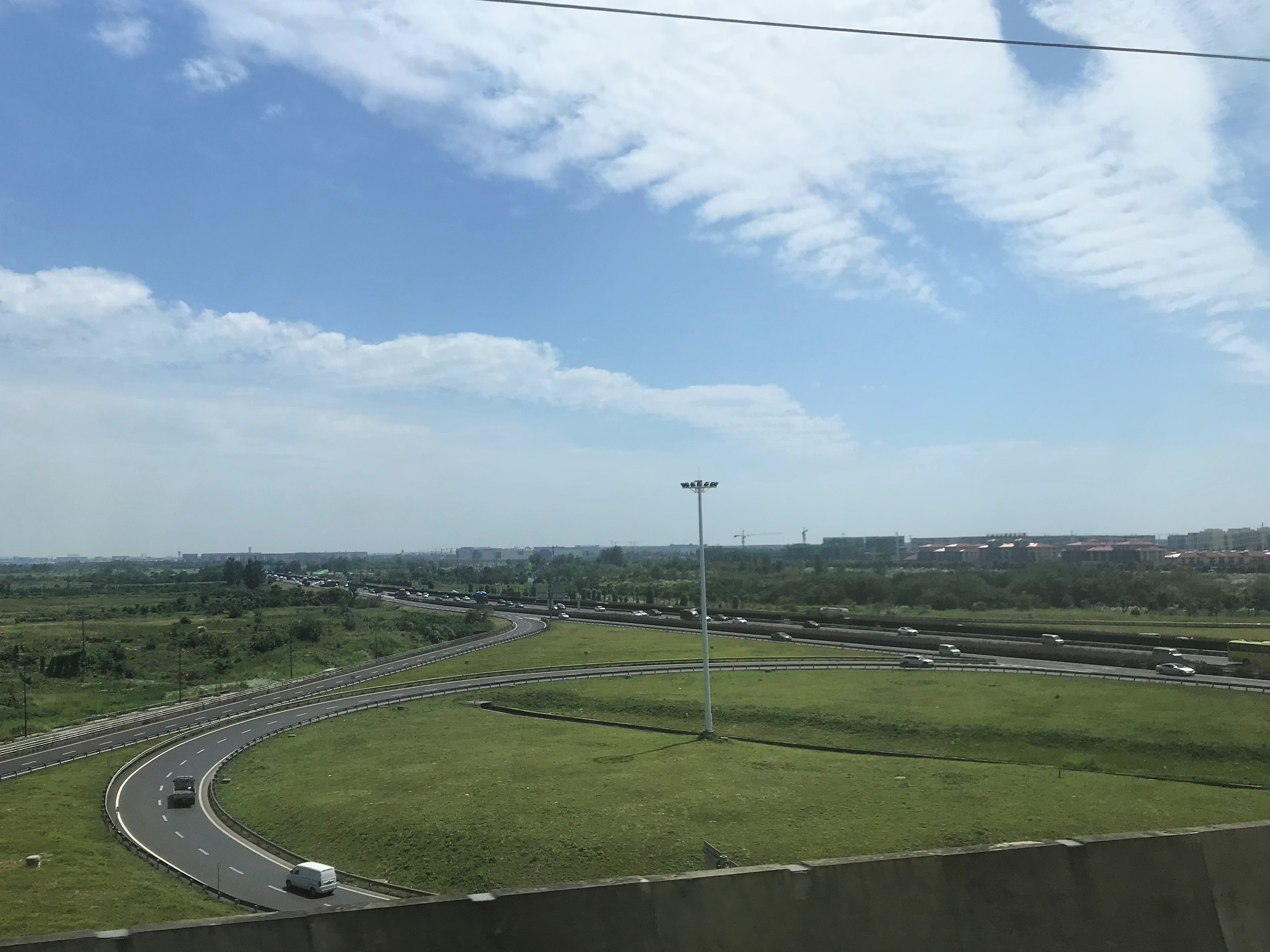
- Chengdu Ring Expressway in August 2019

Route information
- Length: 85 km (53 mi)
- Existed: 2001–present

Location
- Country: China

Highway system
- National Trunk Highway System; Primary; Auxiliary; National Highways; Transport in China
| ← G4201 | → G4211 |

The Chengdu Ring Expressway (Chinese: 成都绕城高速公路), designated as G4202, is a ring expressway in Chengdu, Sichuan, China. The six-lane expressway was opened on 16 December 2001 and it connects multiple expressways in Chengdu.

== History ==
The expressway was originally called Chengdu No. 1 Ring Expressway and had a construction cost of 4.3 billion yuan, with a total length of 85 kilometers, a design speed of 100 kilometers per hour, and emergency shoulder lanes. There are 11 interchange overpasses and 30 separate overpasses along the road, which were officially opened to traffic on 16 December 2001.

== Toll ==
Since 1 December 2019, only vehicles registered in Chengdu that are equipped with ETC devices can enjoy the preferential policy of free passage when passing the above two expressways. The county government finances the unified payment of expressway tolls. Vehicles registered in Chengdu that are not equipped with ETC devices are required to bear the expressway vehicle tolls by themselves.
