= Yuzui Yangtze River Bridge =

Yuzui Yangtze River Bridge 重庆鱼嘴长江大桥
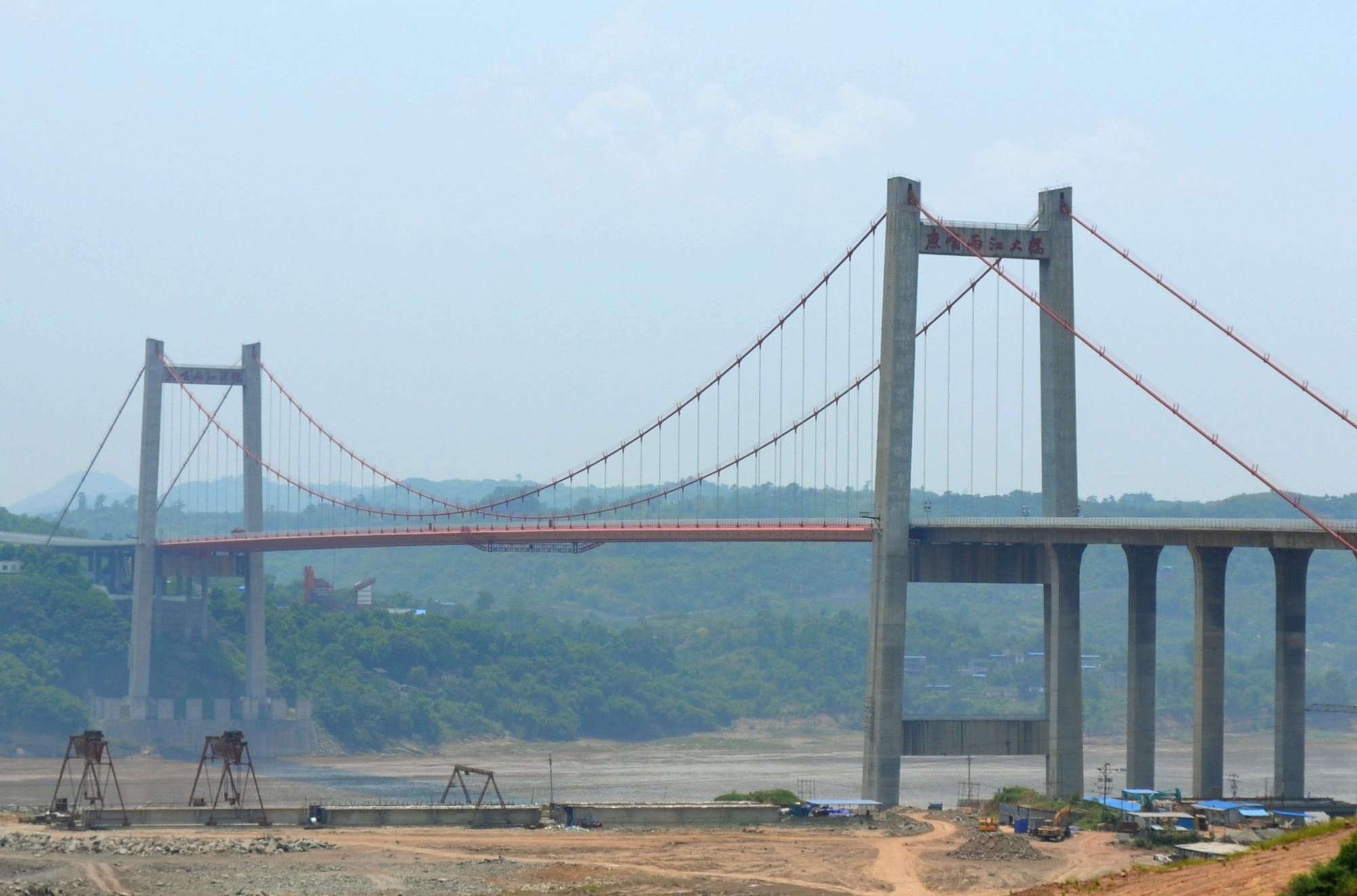
- Coordinates: 29°36′40.7″N 106°46′21.2″E
- Carries: G5001 Chongqing Ring Expressway
- Crosses: Yangtze River
- Locale: Yuzuizhen, Chongqing, China

Characteristics
- Design: Suspension Bridge
- Total length: 1,348 metres (4,423 ft)
- Width: 33 metres (108 ft)
- Longest span: 616 metres (2,021 ft)

History
- Opened: 2009

Location
- Interactive map of Yuzui Yangtze River Bridge

Yuzui Yangtze River Bridge is a suspension bridge spanning 616 metres (2,021 ft) over the Yangtze River near Yuzuizhen, Chongqing, China. The bridge is 33 metres (108 ft) wide and carries the G5001 Chongqing Ring Expressway between the Nan'an District south of the Yangtze River and the Jiangbei District to the north.

== See also ==
- List of longest suspension bridge spans
- Yangtze River bridges and tunnels
