= Zhijing River Bridge =

Zhijing River Bridge 支井河大桥
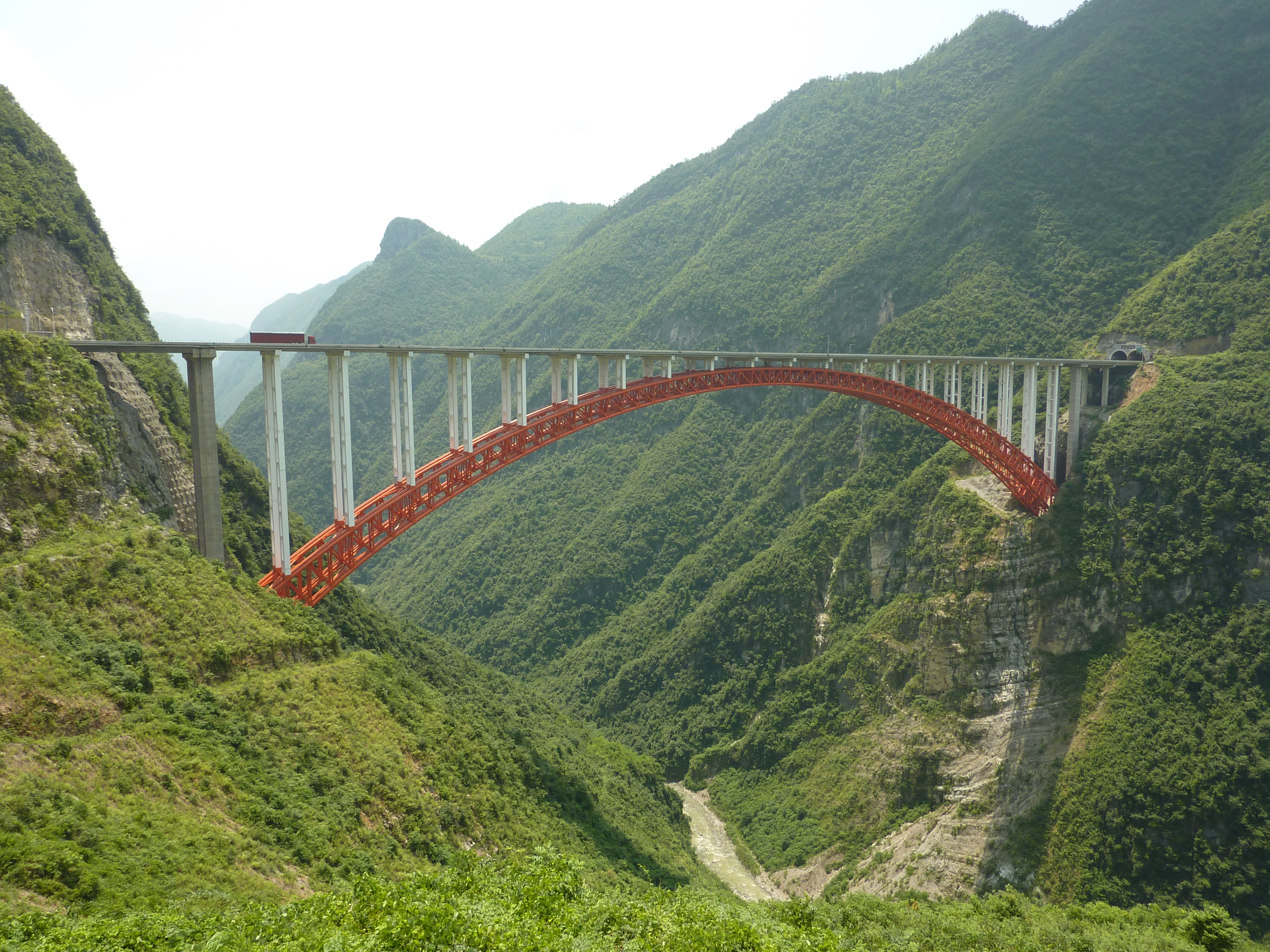
- Coordinates: 30.625846°N 110.196594°E
- Carries: G50 Shanghai–Chongqing Expressway
- Crosses: Zhijinghe River
- Locale: Badong County, Hubei, China
- Official name: Zhijinghe Daqiao

Characteristics
- Design: Arch
- Material: Steel
- Longest span: 430 m (1,410 ft)
- Clearance below: 294 m (965 ft)

History
- Opened: November 28, 2009

Zhijing River Bridge was the highest arch bridge in the world upon its completion in 2009. The 294 metres high bridge in the Three Gorges region of China carries the G50 Shanghai–Chongqing Expressway across the valley of the Zhijing River, a northern tributary of the Qing River. With a main span of 430 metres the bridge is also one of the 20 longest arch bridges in the world. The bridge is located between the towns of Yesanguan and Dazhiping in Badong County of the Enshi Tujia and Miao Autonomous Prefecture of Hubei Province. The world's highest bridge the Sidu River Bridge is situated only 20km eastwards along the G50 Shanghai–Chongqing Expressway.

== See also ==
- List of highest bridges in the world
- List of longest arch bridge spans
