= Wuhan Junshan Yangtze River Bridge =

Wuhan Junshan Yangtze River Bridge 武汉军山长江大桥
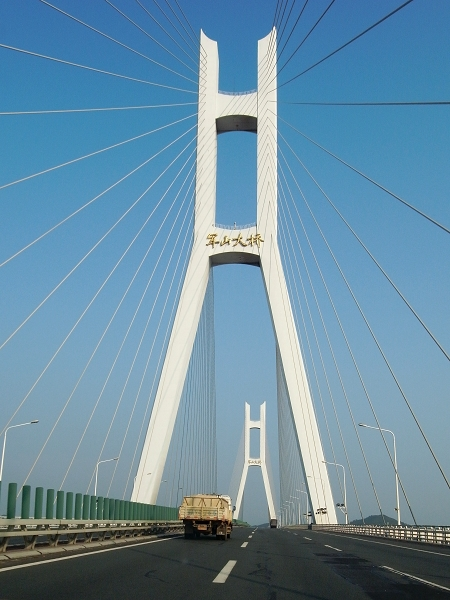
- Coordinates: 30.374028°N 114.140278°E
- Carries: G4 Beijing–Hong Kong and Macau Expressway; G50 Shanghai–Chongqing Expressway; G4201 Wuhan Ring Expressway
- Crosses: Yangtze River
- Locale: Wuhan, Hubei, China
- Other name: Wuhan Bridge No. 4

Characteristics
- Design: Cable-stayed
- Total length: 2,847 metres (9,341 ft)
- Longest span: 460 metres (1,510 ft)

History
- Construction start: 1998
- Construction end: 2001

Location
- Interactive map of Wuhan Junshan Yangtze River Bridge

The Wuhan Junshan Yangtze River Bridge is a large cable-stayed bridge over the Yangtze River. The bridge carries 6 lanes of traffic between Caidian District and Jiangxia District of Wuhan, Hubei. A concurrency of expressways go over the bridge: The G4 Beijing–Hong Kong and Macau Expressway, the G50 Shanghai–Chongqing Expressway, and the G4201 Wuhan Ring Expressway. The bridge, which was opened in 2001, is one of the largest cable-stayed bridges in the world.

The bridge is named for Junshan (军山, "the Army Mountain"), a lone mountain on the left bank of the Yangtze upstream from the bridge.

== See also ==
- Yangtze River bridges and tunnels
- List of largest cable-stayed bridges
