= G5011 Wuhu–Hefei Expressway =

Road in China

Wuhu–Hefei Expressway
- 芜湖－合肥高速公路
- Wuhe Expressway 芜合高速公路

Route information
- Auxiliary route of G50

Major junctions
- Southeast end: G50 / G4211 in Wuhu, Anhui
- Northwest end: G3 / G40 / G42 in Hefei, Anhui

Location
- Country: China

Highway system
- National Trunk Highway System; Primary; Auxiliary; National Highways; Transport in China
← G5001	→ G5012

The G5011 Wuhu–Hefei Expressway (Chinese: 芜湖—合肥高速公路), commonly referred to as the Wuhe Expressway (Chinese: 芜合高速公路), is an expressway in China that connects Wuhu, Anhui and Hefei, Anhui. It is a spur of G50 Shanghai–Chongqing Expressway and is completely in Anhui Province.
