= Ring roads of Wuhan =

Road network in Wuhan, China

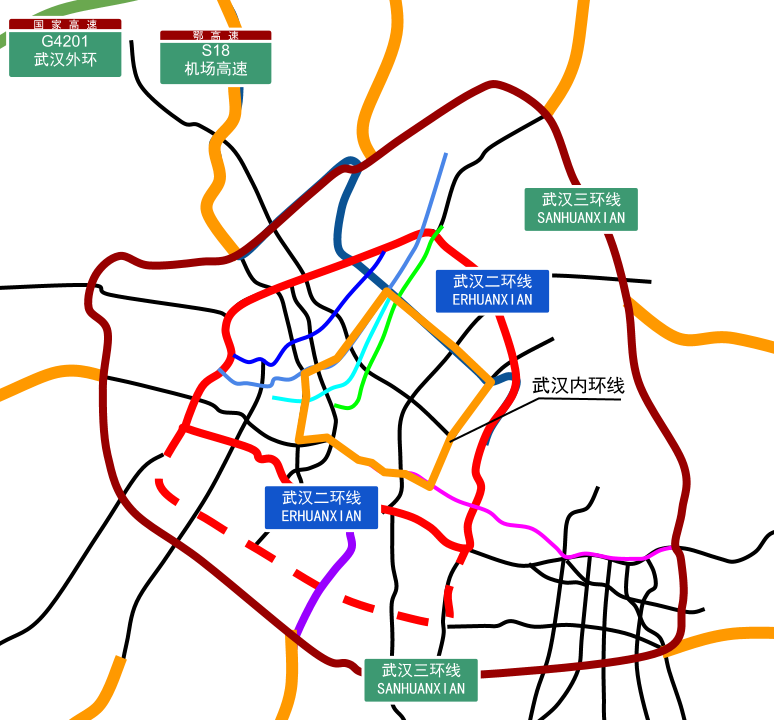
Map of Wuhan with Inner ring road in orange; second ring road in red; third ring road in brown

There are 4 concentric ring roads in Wuhan, China.

== Inner Ring Road ==
The Inner Ring Road (Chinese: 武汉内环线; pinyin: Wǔhàn Nèihuánxiàn; lit. 'Wuhan Inner Ring Line'), is a 28-kilometer (17 mi)-long ring road consisting of a collection of surface arterial roads connecting the busy riverside commercial areas of Wuhan's three main central districts. The ring road was formed when the Second Wuhan Yangtze River Bridge opened, forming a complete loop with the already completed Wuhan Yangtze River Bridge and existing surface streets.

== Second Ring Road ==
The Second Ring Road (Chinese: 武汉二环线; pinyin: Wǔhàn èrhuánxiàn; lit. 'Wuhan Second Ring Line'), is a 48-kilometer (30 mi)-long long elevated ring expressway encircling the downtown areas of Wuhan. It crosses the Yangtze River using the Erqi Yangtze River Bridge in the north and the Yingwuzhou Yangtze River Bridge in the south.

== Third Ring Road ==
The Third Ring Road (Chinese: 武汉三环线; pinyin: Wǔhàn Sānhuánxiàn; literally: "Wuhan Third Ring Line"), formerly known as Middle Ring Road(中环线), is a 91-kilometer (57 mi)-long ring expressway. The western section which includes the Baishazhou Yangtze River Bridge opened in the 2000s. The eastern section includes the Tianxingzhou Yangtze River Bridge. It was fully completed on December 30, 2010.

== Fourth Ring Road ==
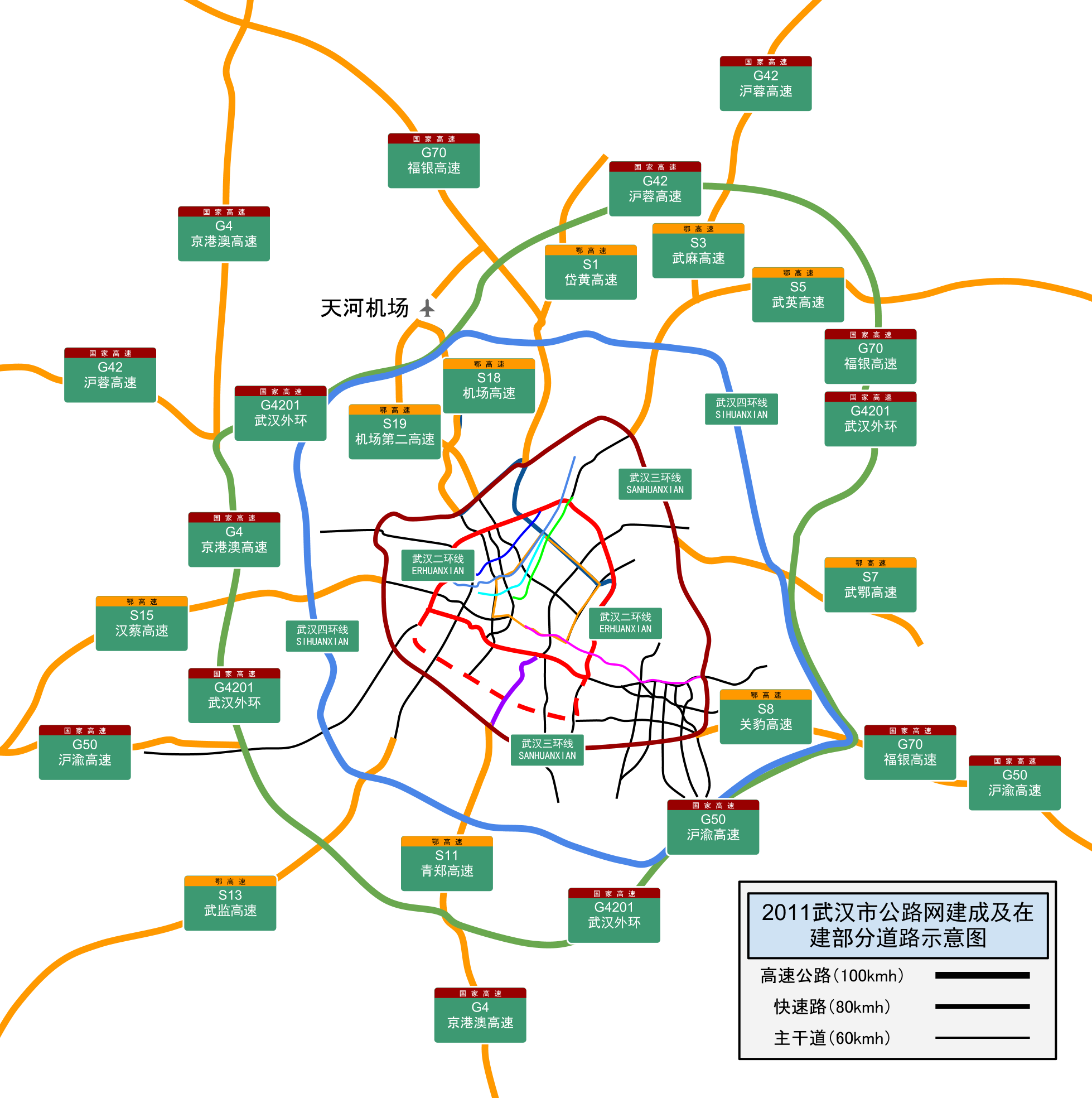
Map of Wuhan with Fourth Ring Road in blue.

The Fourth Ring Road (Chinese: 武汉四环线; pinyin: Wǔhàn Sānhuánxiàn; literally: "Wuhan Fourth Ring Line"), is an under construction 146-kilometer (91 mi)-long ring expressway. Construction of the western section between State Road 107 and the Wuhan Economic and Technological Development Zone started November 20, 2011. On June 19, 2017 the Wuhan Hanjiang Bridge opened, carrying the southern section of the ring road across the Yangtze river.
