= Outer-ring Jiangjin Yangtze River Bridge =

Outer-ring Jiangjin Yangtze River Bridge 外环江津长江大桥
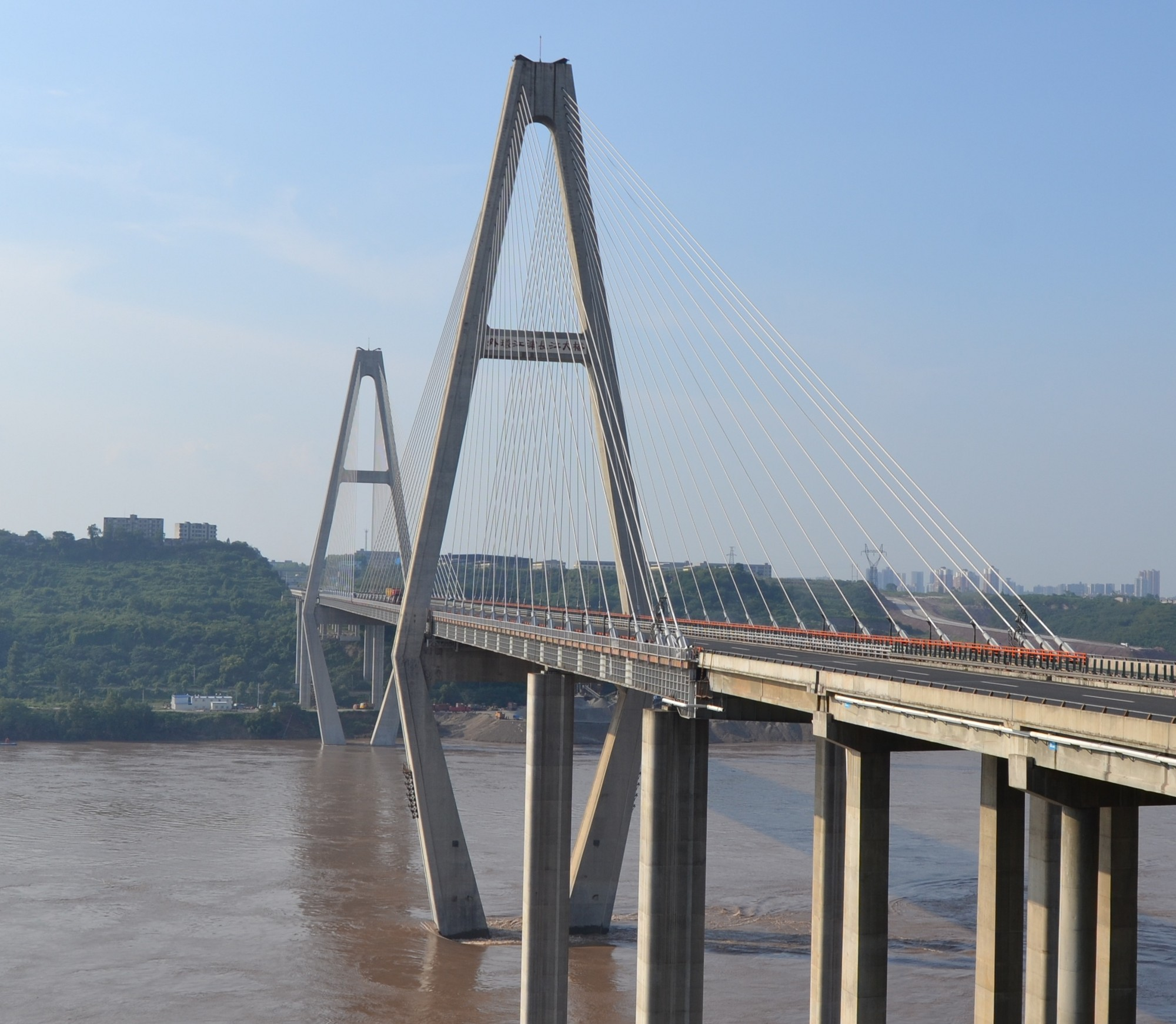
- Coordinates: 29.263444°N 106.321222°E
- Carries: G93 Chengyu Ring Expressway; G5001 Chongqing Ring Expressway
- Crosses: Yangtze River
- Locale: Chongqing, China

Characteristics
- Design: Cable-stayed
- Total length: 1,200 metres (3,900 ft)
- Width: 36.2 metres (119 ft)
- Longest span: 436 metres (1,430 ft)

History
- Opened: 2009

Location
- Interactive map of Outer-ring Jiangjin Yangtze River Bridge

The Outer-ring Jiangjin Yangtze River Bridge, formerly known as Jiangjin Guanyinyan Bridge during construction, is a cable-stayed bridge which crosses the Yangtze River in near Jiangjin, Chongqing, China. Completed in December 2009, it has a main span of 436 metres (1,430 ft) placing it among the longest cable-stayed spans in the world. The bridge carries six lanes of traffic between on the G93 Chengdu–Chongqing Ring Expressway and G5001 Chongqing Ring Expressway between the Jiangjin District south of the Yangtze River and the Jiulongpo District to the north.

== See also ==
- List of largest cable-stayed bridges
- Yangtze River bridges and tunnels
