= G4211 Nanjing–Wuhu Expressway =

Road in China

Nanjing–Wuhu Expressway
- 南京－芜湖高速公路
- Ningwu Expressway 宁芜高速公路

Route information
- Auxiliary route of G42

Major junctions
- North end: G42 / G2501 in Nanjing, Jiangsu
- South end: G50 / G5011 in Wuhu, Anhui

Location
- Country: China

Highway system
- National Trunk Highway System; Primary; Auxiliary; National Highways; Transport in China
← G4202	→ G4212

The G4211 Nanjing–Wuhu Expressway (Chinese: 南京—芜湖高速公路), commonly referred to as the Ningwu Expressway (Chinese: 宁芜高速公路), is a north-south bound expressway that connects Nanjing, the capital city of Jiangsu and Wuhu, Anhui in China. It is an auxiliary route of G42 Shanghai–Chengdu Expressway that connects the parallel G42 and G50 Shanghai-Chongqing Expressway. The expressway spans a length of 75 km (47 mi), passes two provinces and serves the cities of Nanjing, Jiangsu; Ma'anshan, Anhui; and Wuhu, Anhui. The north terminus of G4211 is at Tianbao Bridge in Yuhuatai District, Nanjing, and the south terminus connects to G50 and G5011 Wuhu-Hefei Expressway via a cloverleaf interchange in Wuhu. G4211 is a four-lane limited access tollway for its entire length.

== Route Description ==
Lengths
	mi	km
Jiangsu	17	27
Anhui	30	48
Total	47	75

=== Jiangsu ===
G4211 begins at the G42 exit at Tianbao Bridge. The expressway then turns south through the Liucun Interchange, which connects Jiangsu S005 and G205 National Highway, and begins its concurrence with Jiangsu S105. G4211 is then connected to G2501 via two trumpet interchanges and a connector. From there, the expressway runs parallel to G205, as well as the Nanjing-Wuhu Railway. The route crosses Jiangsu-Anhui border at an exit to G205 and enters Ma'anshan, Anhui.

=== Anhui ===
G4211 continues to run parallel to G205, but bypasses downtown Ma'anshan to its east. At Nanhuanlu Road exit, the two parallel routes are connected via a G205 spur. The expressway then heads still south and bypasses Dangtu County, crossing Guxi River immediately to the south of downtown. It proceeds southbound until eventually terminating at a cloverleaf interchange with G50 and G5011 west to downtown Wuhu.
