= Yichang Yangtze River Highway Bridge =

Yichang Bridge 宜昌长江公路大桥
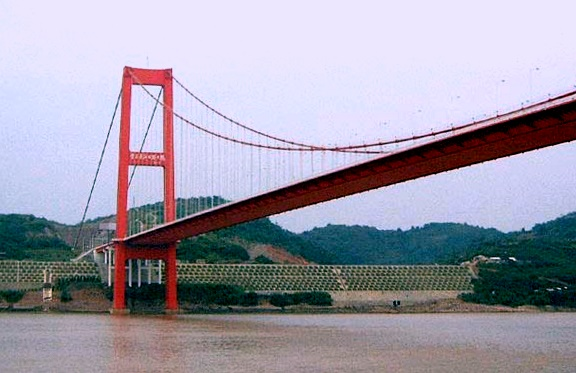
- Coordinates: 30.569601°N 111.391536°E
- Carries: G50 Shanghai–Chongqing Expressway
- Crosses: Yangtze River
- Official name: Yichang Highway Bridge (宜昌长江公路大桥)

Characteristics
- Design: suspension bridge
- Total length: 1,187 metres (3,894 ft)
- Longest span: 960 metres (3,150 ft)

History
- Construction start: February 19, 1998
- Construction end: 2001
- Opened: September 19, 2001

The Yichang Yangtze River Highway Bridge (simplified Chinese: 宜昌长江公路大桥; traditional Chinese: 宜昌長江公路大橋; pinyin: Yíchāng Changjiang Gonglu Dàqiáo) is a suspension bridge that crosses the Yangtze River some 20 km downstream from the center city of Yichang, China. It is located within the prefecture-level city of Yichang, and carries the G50 Shanghai–Chongqing Expressway.

The construction of the bridge started on 19 February 1998, and it was open for traffic on 19 September 2001.

It has a main span of 960 meters (3,150 feet). As of 2012, it is among the 30 longest suspension bridges, based on the length of the main span.

The cost of building the bridge was reported as 895 million yuan.

== See also ==
- List of longest suspension bridge spans
- List of bridges in China
- Yangtze River bridges and tunnels
