= Yingwuzhou Yangtze River Bridge =

Yingwuzhou Yangtze River Bridge 武汉鹦鹉洲长江大桥
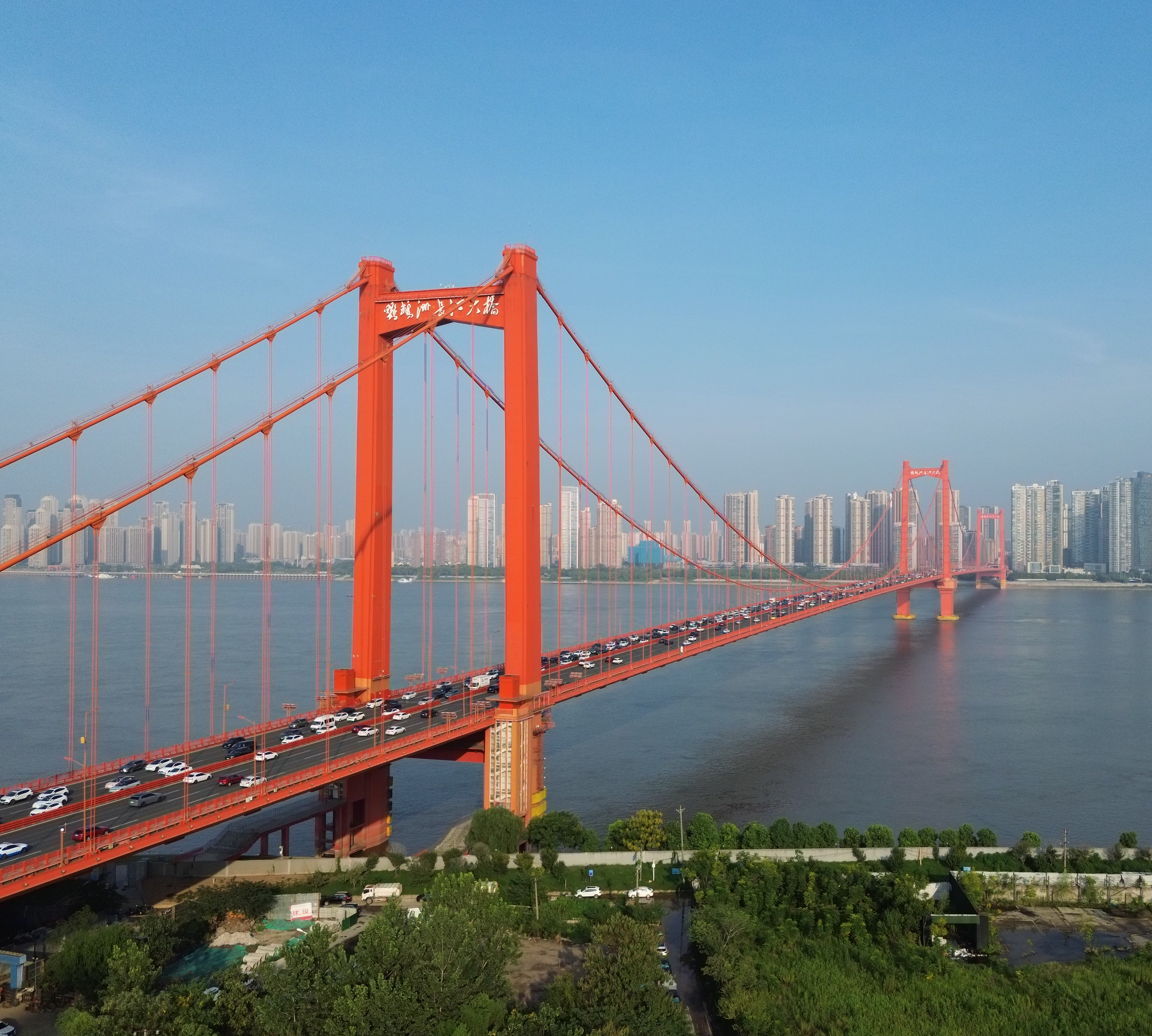
- Coordinates: 30.528028°N 114.27325°E
- Carries: Road traffic
- Crosses: Yangtze River
- Locale: Wuhan, Hubei, China
- Other name(s): Parrot Island Bridge

Characteristics
- Design: Suspension Bridge
- Material: Steel
- Total length: 2,100 metres (6,900 ft)
- Longest span: 850 metres (2,790 ft) x2

History
- Construction start: 2011
- Construction cost: 3.08 billion RMB
- Opened: 28 December 2014

The Yingwuzhou Yangtze River Bridge (Chinese: 鹦鹉洲长江大桥) is a bridge carrying the southern section of the Second Ring Road over the Yangtze River in Wuhan, Hubei Province, China. It is one of the longest suspension bridges in the world with two consecutive 850 m (2,790 ft) spans. The bridge cost 3.08 billion yuan to build and opened on December 28, 2014. Yingwuzhou literally means "parrot island," a famous island that was mentioned many times in Tang dynasty poems, but has now been part of Hanyang due to the redirection of the river.

== See also ==
- Bridges and tunnels across the Yangtze River
- List of longest suspension bridge spans
- List of largest bridges in China
