= Zelin =

Zelin is a surname. Notable people with the surname include:

- Alexander Zelin (born 1953), Russian Air Force colonel-general
- Madeleine Zelin, American sinologist
- Steven Zelin, American singer-songwriter

There are also some places named Zelin:

- Zelin (泽林), a town in Echeng District, Ezhou, Hubei, China
- Zelin Mrzlovodički, a village in Croatia
- Zelin Crnoluški, a village in Croatia
