= G5001 Chongqing Ring Expressway =

Orbital road in Chongqing, China

Chongqing Ring Expressway
- 重庆绕城高速公路
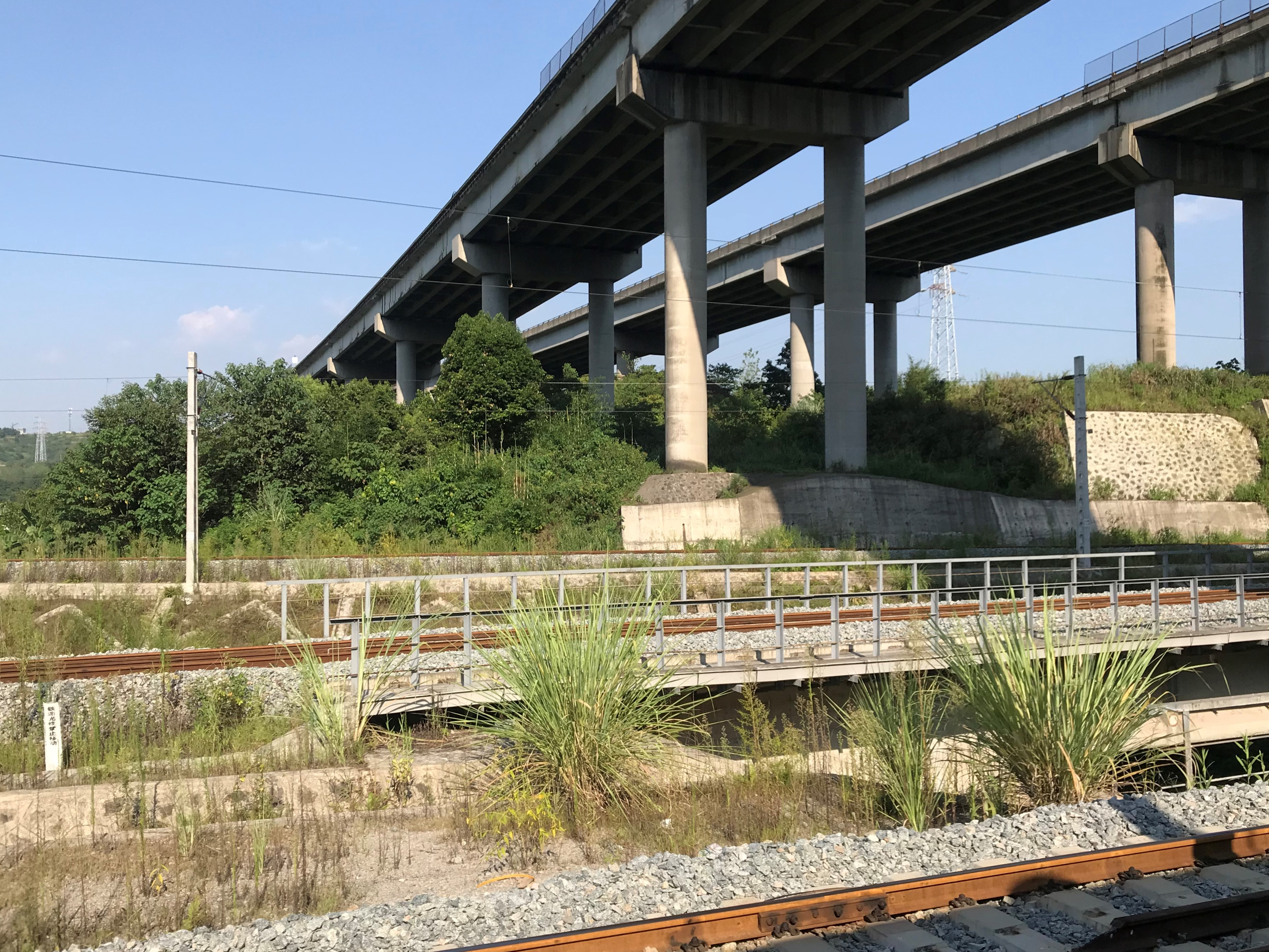
- Chongqing Ring Expressway in August 2019

Route information
- Length: 184.97 km (114.94 mi)
- Existed: 2008–present

Location
- Country: China

Highway system
- National Trunk Highway System; Primary; Auxiliary; National Highways; Transport in China
← G50	→ G5011

The Chongqing Ring Expressway (Chinese: 重庆绕城高速公路), designated as G5001 and also known as the Outer Ring Expressway, is a ring expressway around the main urban area of Chongqing, China.

== Overview ==
The Chongqing Ring Expressway has a total length of 184.97 kilometers and passes through Yubei, Jiangbei, Banan, Jiangjin, Jiulongpo, Shapingba and Beibei District of Chongqing.

The expressway features six-lane lanes, the roadbed is 34.5 meters wide, and the design speed is 100-120km/h. The Yuzui Yangtze River Bridge and the Outer-ring Jiangjin Yangtze River Bridge cross the Yangtze River twice, and the Shuitu Jialing River Bridge crosses the Jialing River once.

On 26 December 2008, the west section of the Chongqing Ring Expressway, namely the section from Beibei to Xipeng, opened to traffic and on 31 December 2009, the Chongqing Ring Expressway was fully opened to traffic.
