= Qingchuan Bridge =

Qingchuan Bridge 晴川桥
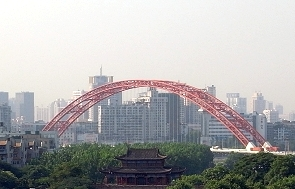
- Coordinates: 30.566111°N 114.278861°E
- Carries: 4 lanes of traffic
- Crosses: Han River
- Locale: Wuhan
- Other name(s): Rainbow Bridge

Characteristics
- Design: Arch
- Material: Steel
- Total length: 989.75 m (3,247.2 ft)
- Longest span: 280 m (920 ft)

History
- Construction start: Dec 20, 1997
- Opened: 2000

The Qingchuan Bridge (simplified Chinese: 晴川桥; traditional Chinese: 晴川橋; pinyin: Qíngchuān Qiáo) is an arch bridge located in Wuhan, People's Republic of China. It is the fourth bridge on the Han River, the third motorway bridge (provisional name being "Third Jianghan Bridge") and also the "Rainbow Bridge" due to its shape and red color. The bridge has a span of 280 m (919 ft), with a full length of 989.75 m (3,247.2 ft). The construction of this bridge begins on Dec 20, 1997, and completed in 2000, which started revenue service to the public. It has four lanes, connects Yanhe Ave in Hankou with Hannan Rd in Hanyang. It used to be a tolled bridge, but after the implementation of electronic toll collection in Wuhan, the toll plaza was razed.

== See also ==
- List of longest arch bridge spans
- Media related to Qingchuan Bridge at Wikimedia Commons
