= Second Wuhan Yangtze River Bridge =

Second Wuhan Yangtze River Bridge 武汉长江二桥
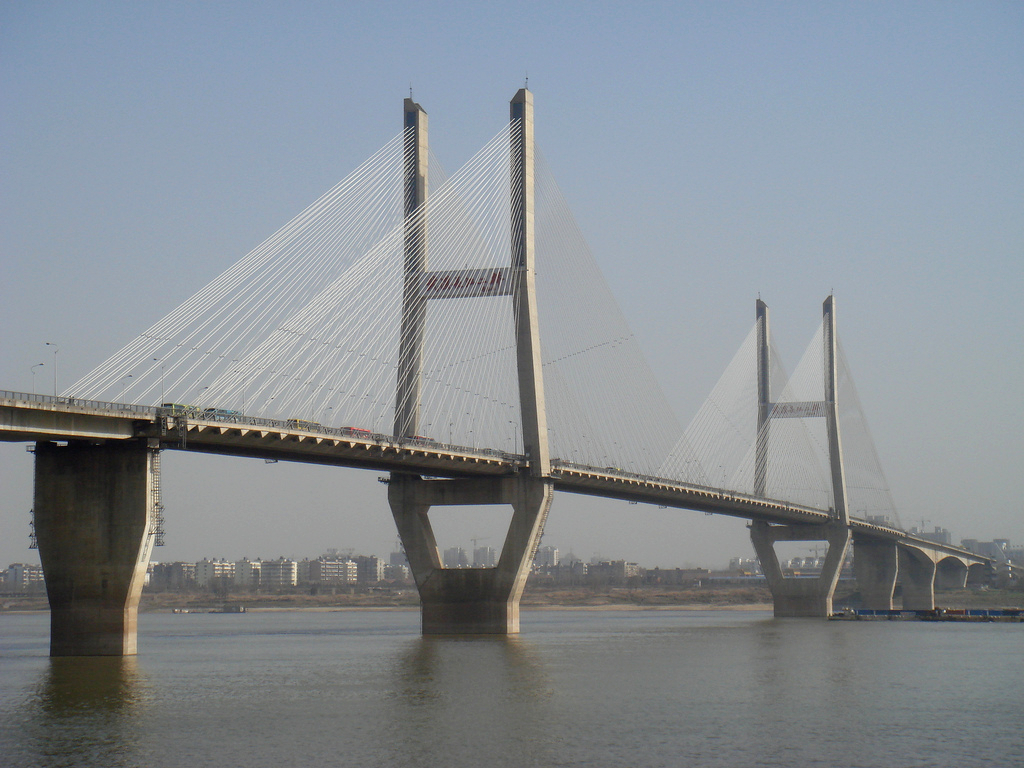
- Coordinates: 30.605152°N 114.320165°E
- Carries: 6 traffic lanes
- Crosses: Yangtze River
- Locale: Wuhan, Hubei, China

Characteristics
- Design: Cable-stayed
- Total length: 1,876 metres (6,155 ft)
- Width: 26 metres (85 ft)
- Longest span: 400 metres (1,300 ft)

History
- Construction start: 1991
- Construction end: 1995

Statistics
- Daily traffic: 50,000 vpd

Location
- Interactive map of Second Wuhan Yangtze River Bridge

The Second Wuhan Yangtze River Bridge (Chinese: 武汉长江二桥, Wuhan Changjiang Er Qiao) is a bridge across the Yangtze River in Wuhan, Hubei province, China. It is located northeast (downstream) of the historic central area of the city's Hankou District and is the northern crossing for the Inner Ring Road. It is a cable-stayed bridge built of pre-stressed concrete, and has a central span of 400 metres (1,300 ft). It is 4.678 kilometres (2.907 mi) in length (including the 1,876-metre (6,155 ft) main span) and is 26 metres (85 ft) wide. Its main bridgeheads are 90 metres (300 ft) high each, pulling 392 thick slanting cables together in the shape of double fans, so that the central span of the bridge is well-balanced on the piers and the bridge's stability and vibration resistance are ensured.

== History ==
The bridge was completed in 1995 with four lanes of traffic capable of handling 50,000 vehicles per day. The bridge featured a median reserved for a branch line of the then planned Wuhan Metro Line 1. By the 2000s, due to growth in population of Wuhan, actual traffic demand using the bridge averaged 100,000 vehicles per day, peaking at 190,000 daily vehicles. The metro line reservation was removed in 2003 when the bridge was renovated and expanded to six lanes. With the opening of the Erqi Yangtze River Bridge downstream in 2011 typical traffic using the Second Wuhan Yangtze River Bridge was 120,000 vehicles per day.

== Photo gallery ==
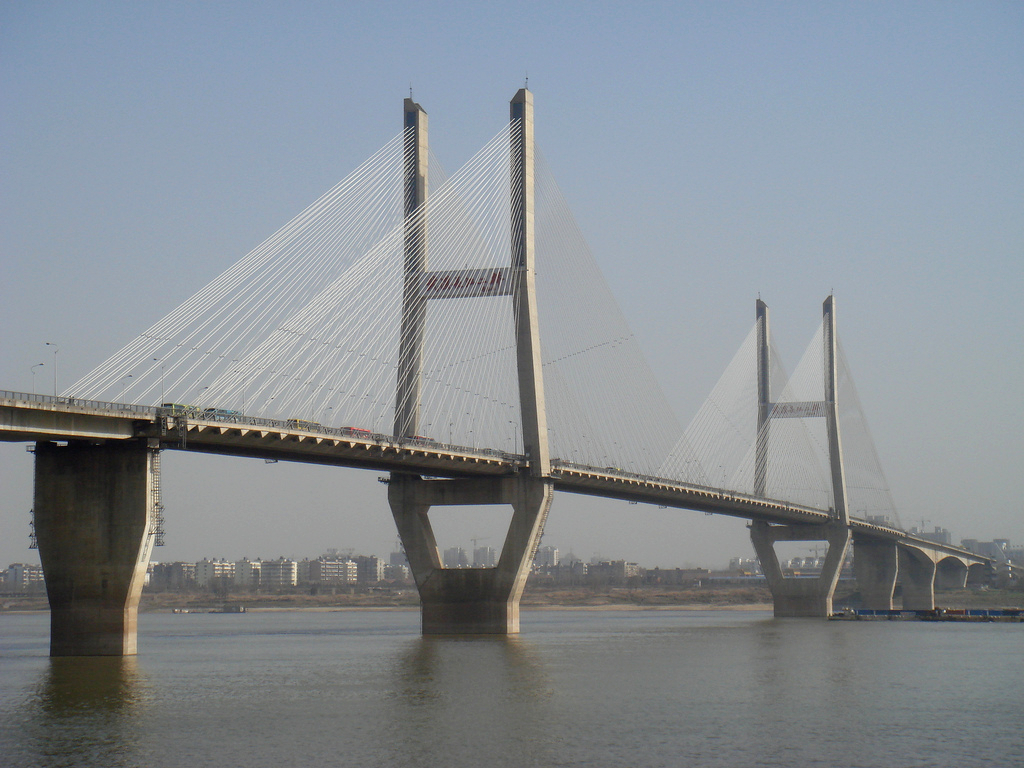

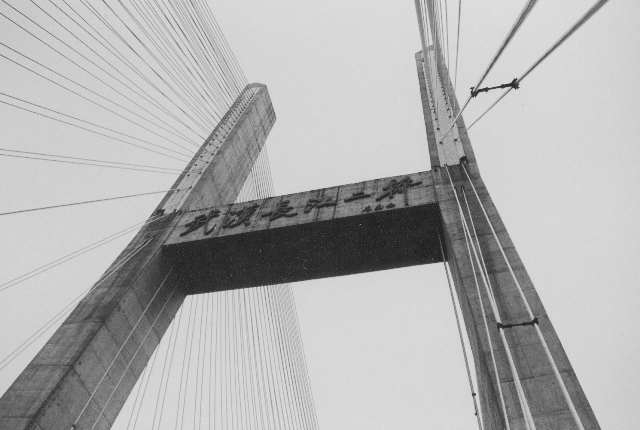

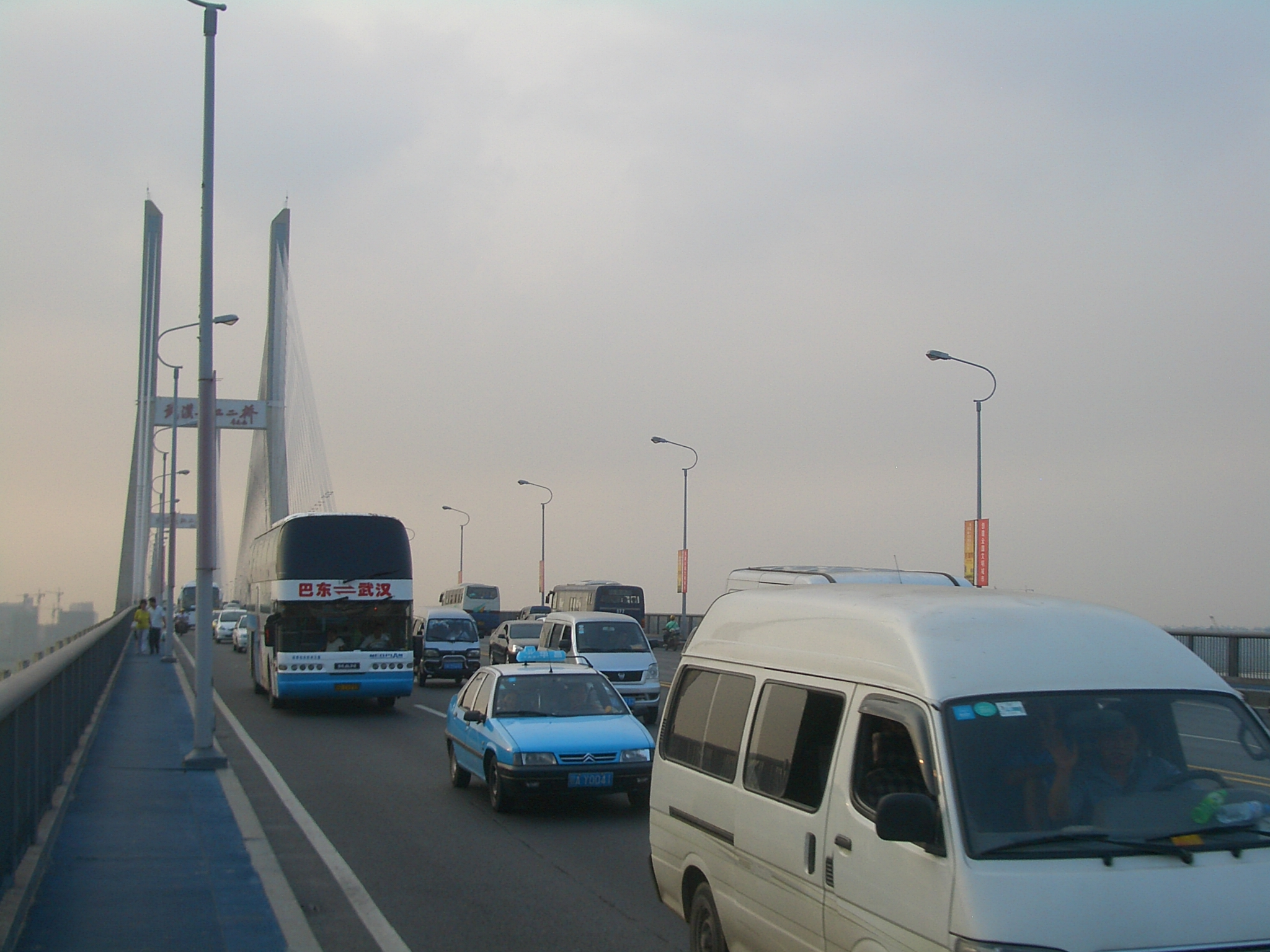

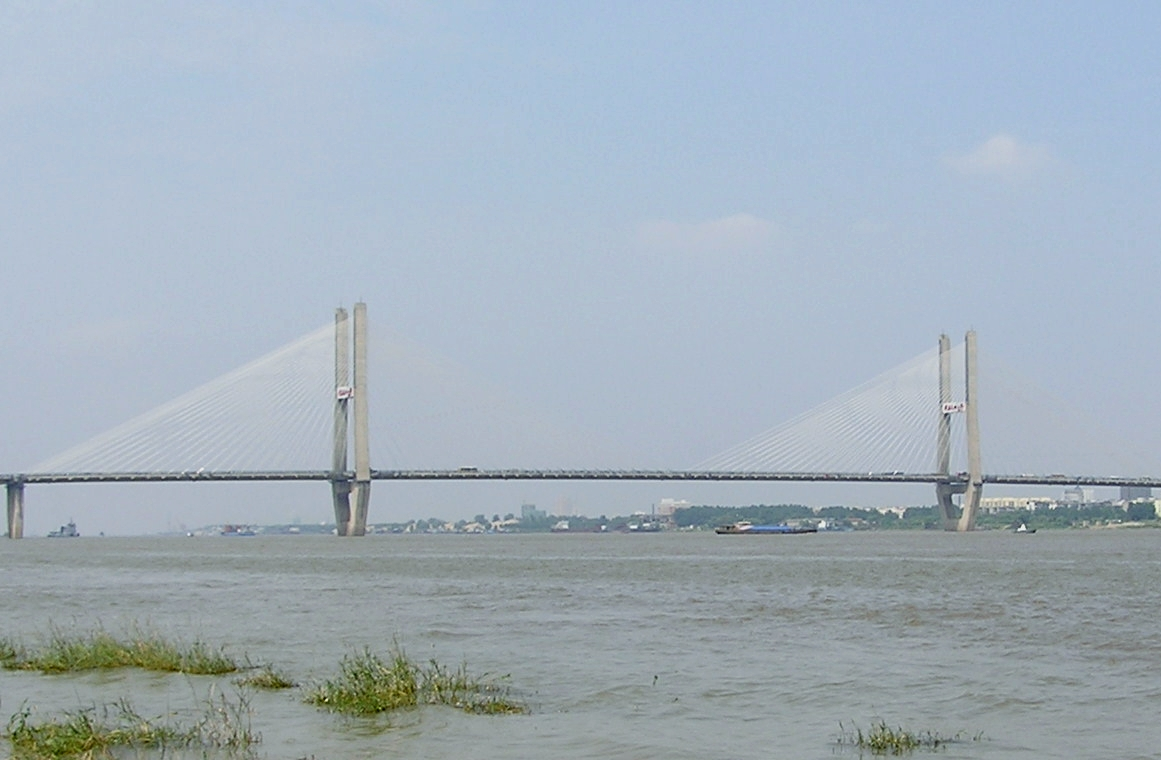

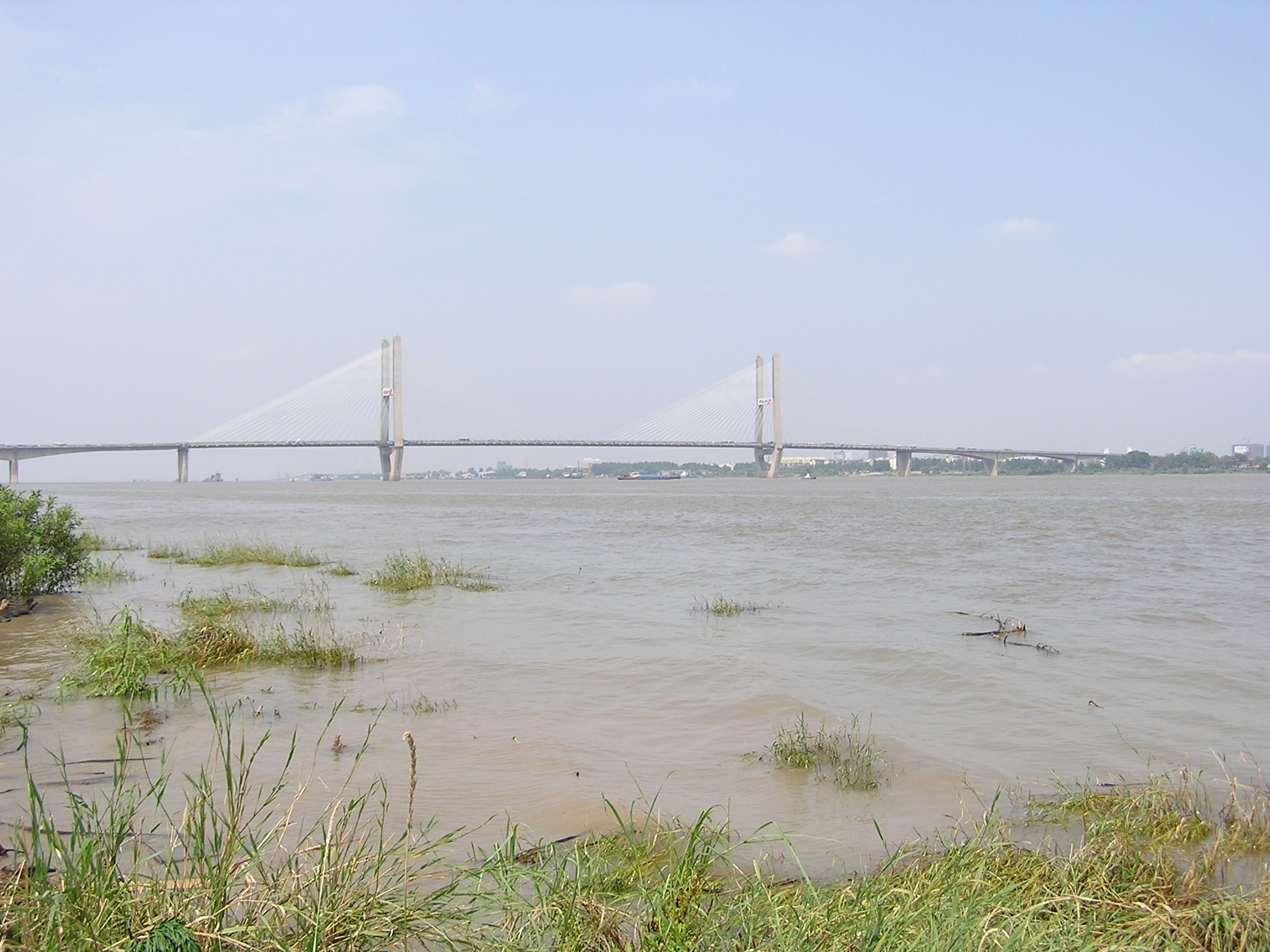

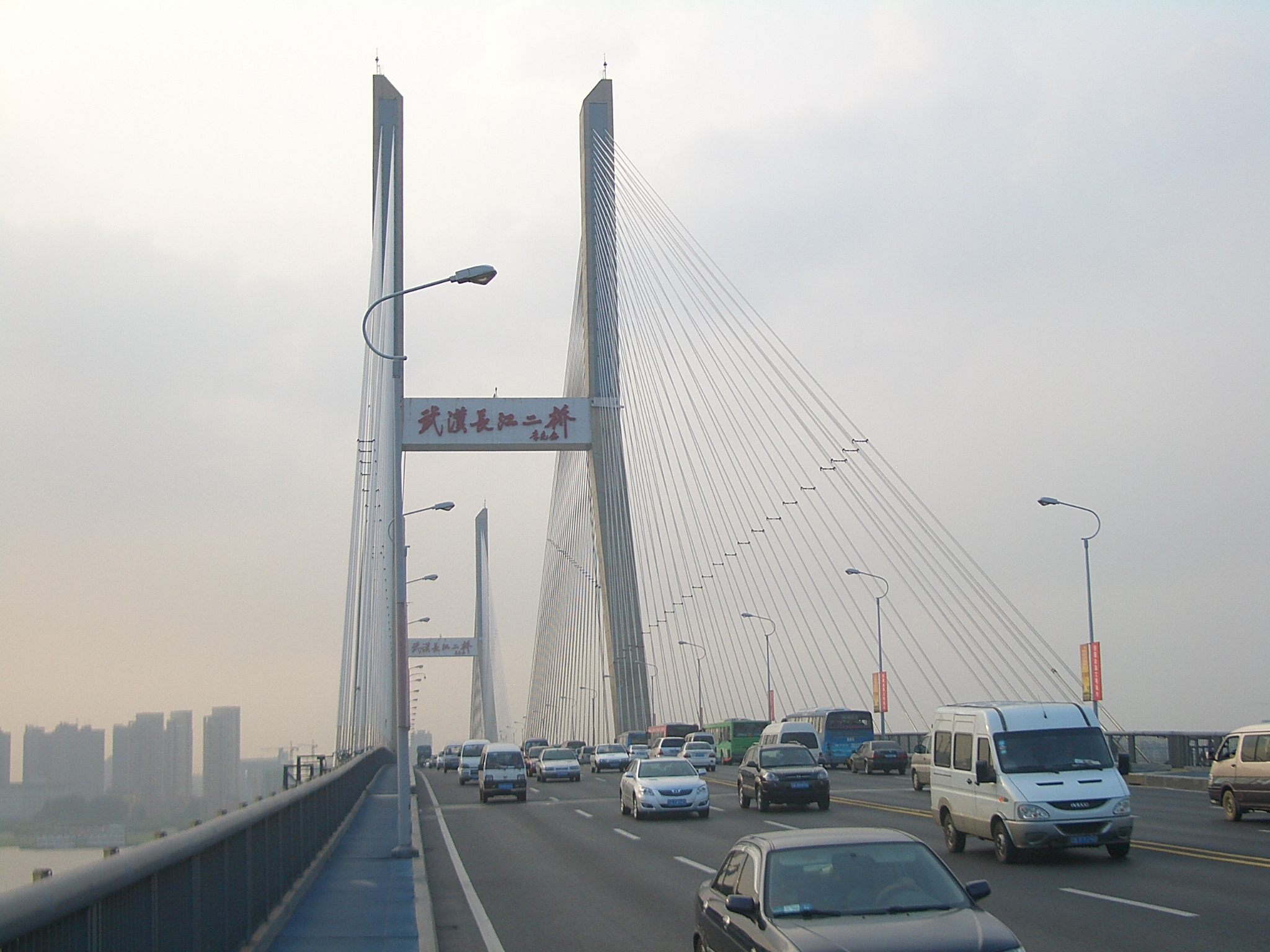

== See also ==
- List of largest cable-stayed bridges
- Yangtze River bridges and tunnels
