= Erqi Yangtze River Bridge =

Bridge in People's Republic of China

Erqi Bridge 武汉二七长江大桥
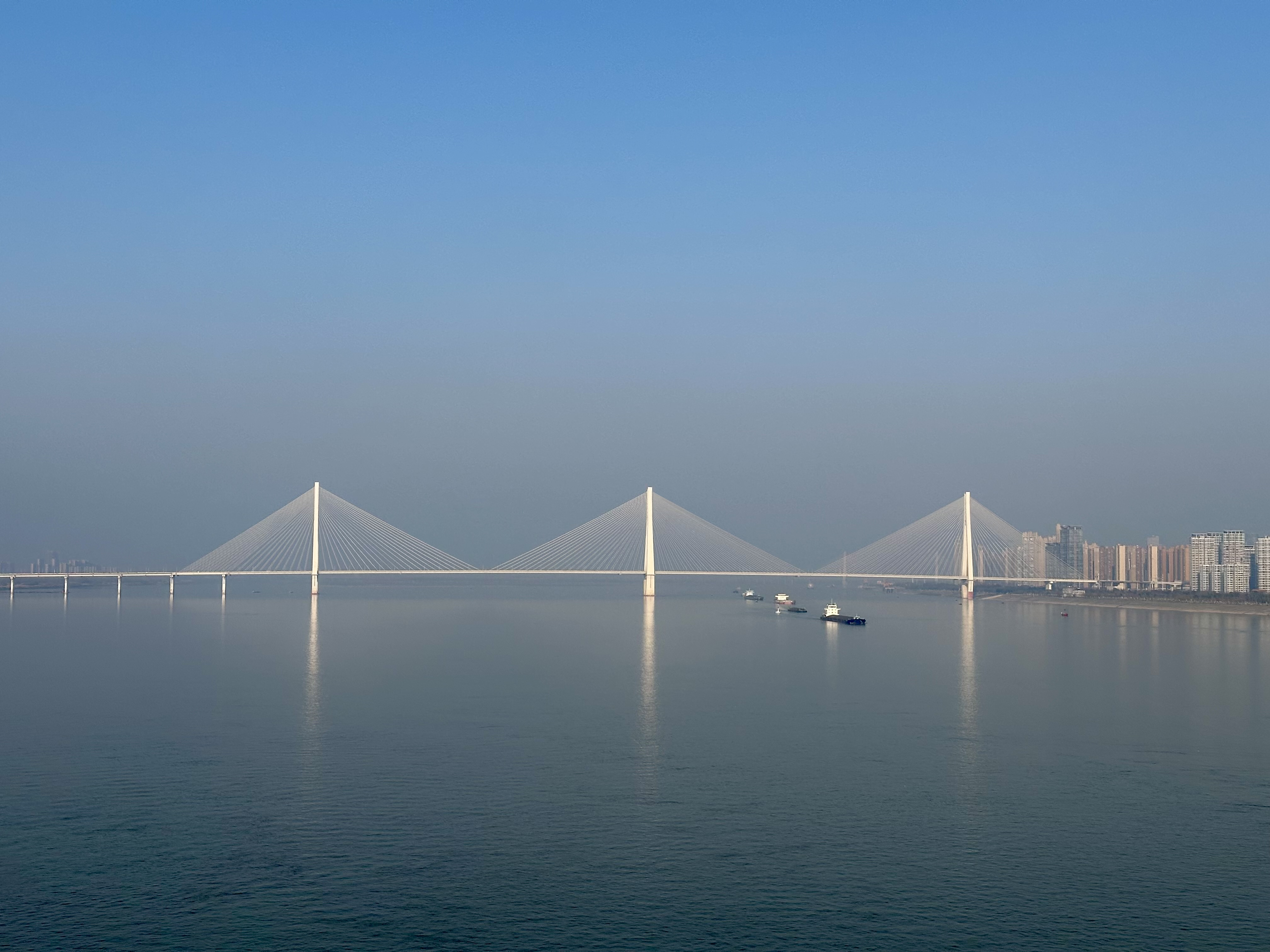
- Coordinates: 30.627605°N 114.342012°E
- Carries: 8 lanes of Wuhan Second Ring Road
- Crosses: Yangtze River
- Locale: Wuhan, Hubei, China

Characteristics
- Design: Cable-stayed
- Total length: 2,922 m (9,586.6 ft)
- Height: 209 m (685.7 ft)
- Longest span: 616 m (2,021.0 ft) x2

History
- Engineering design by: CCCC Second Harbour Engineering Company LTD.
- Construction start: 2008
- Construction cost: 7.284 Billion RMB
- Opened: December 31, 2011

Location
- Interactive map of Erqi Bridge

The Erqi Yangtze River Bridge is a highway bridge over the Yangtze River in Wuhan, Hubei Province, China. The bridge is 2,922 metres (9,587 ft) long and carries eight lanes of traffic on the Second Ring Road. With two main spans of 616 metres (2,021 ft) it is the world's longest double span cable-stayed bridge. Construction of the bridge began in 2008 and the bridge was opened on December 31, 2011.

== See also ==
- Bridges and tunnels across the Yangtze River
- List of bridges in China
- List of longest cable-stayed bridge spans
- List of tallest bridges
