= G4201 Wuhan Ring Expressway =

Road in China

Wuhan Ring Expressway
- 武汉绕城高速公路
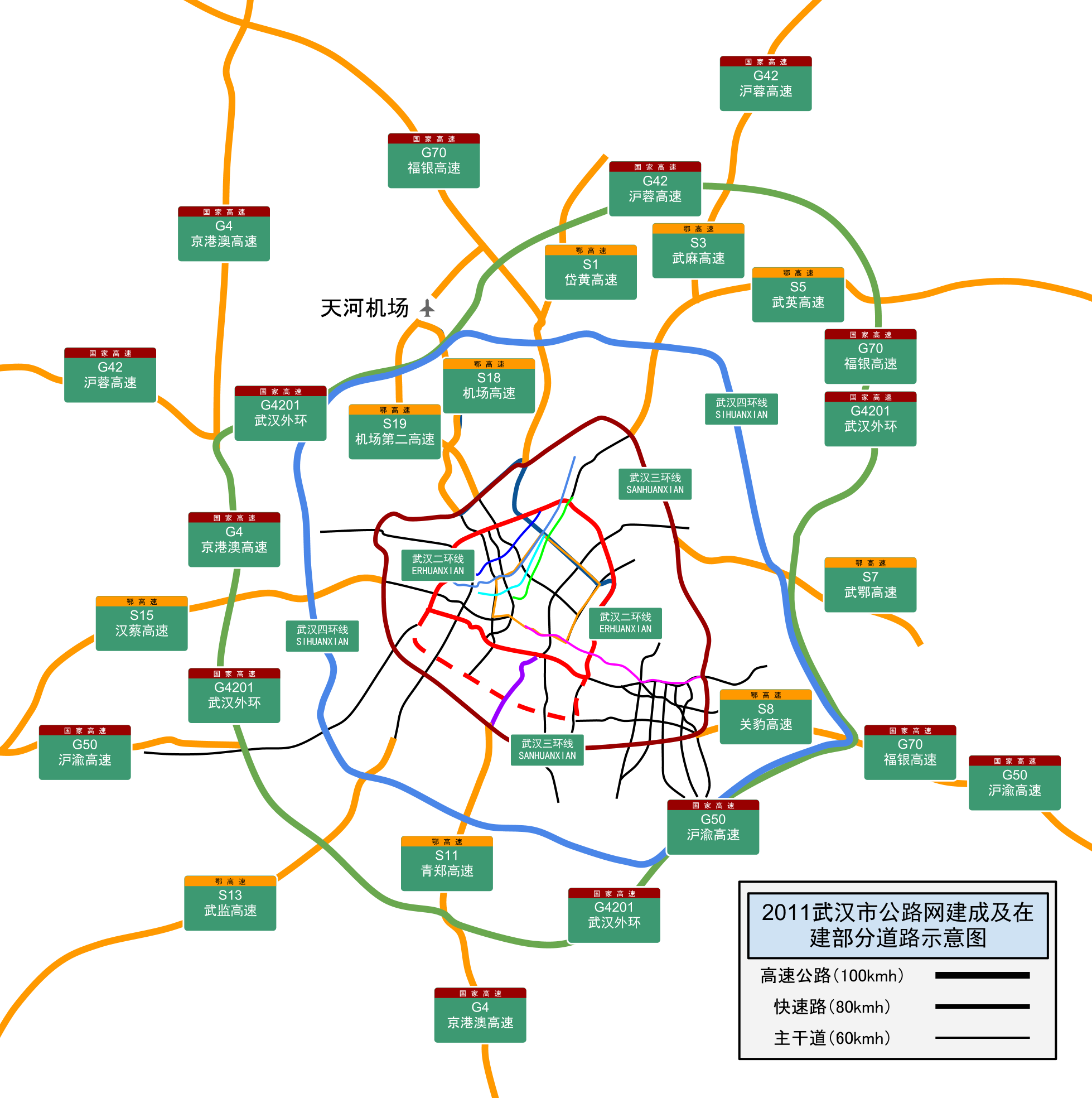

Route information
- Length: 188 km (117 mi)

Location
- Country: China

Highway system
- National Trunk Highway System; Primary; Auxiliary; National Highways; Transport in China
← G42	→ G4202

The Wuhan Ring Expressway (Chinese: 武汉绕城高速公路), designated as G4201, is an 188-kilometre-long expressway (117 mi) in Wuhan, Hubei, China. The national motorway runs on parts of G4, G42, G50 and G70.
