= Baishazhou Yangtze River Bridge =

Baishazhou Yangtze River Bridge 武汉白沙洲长江大桥
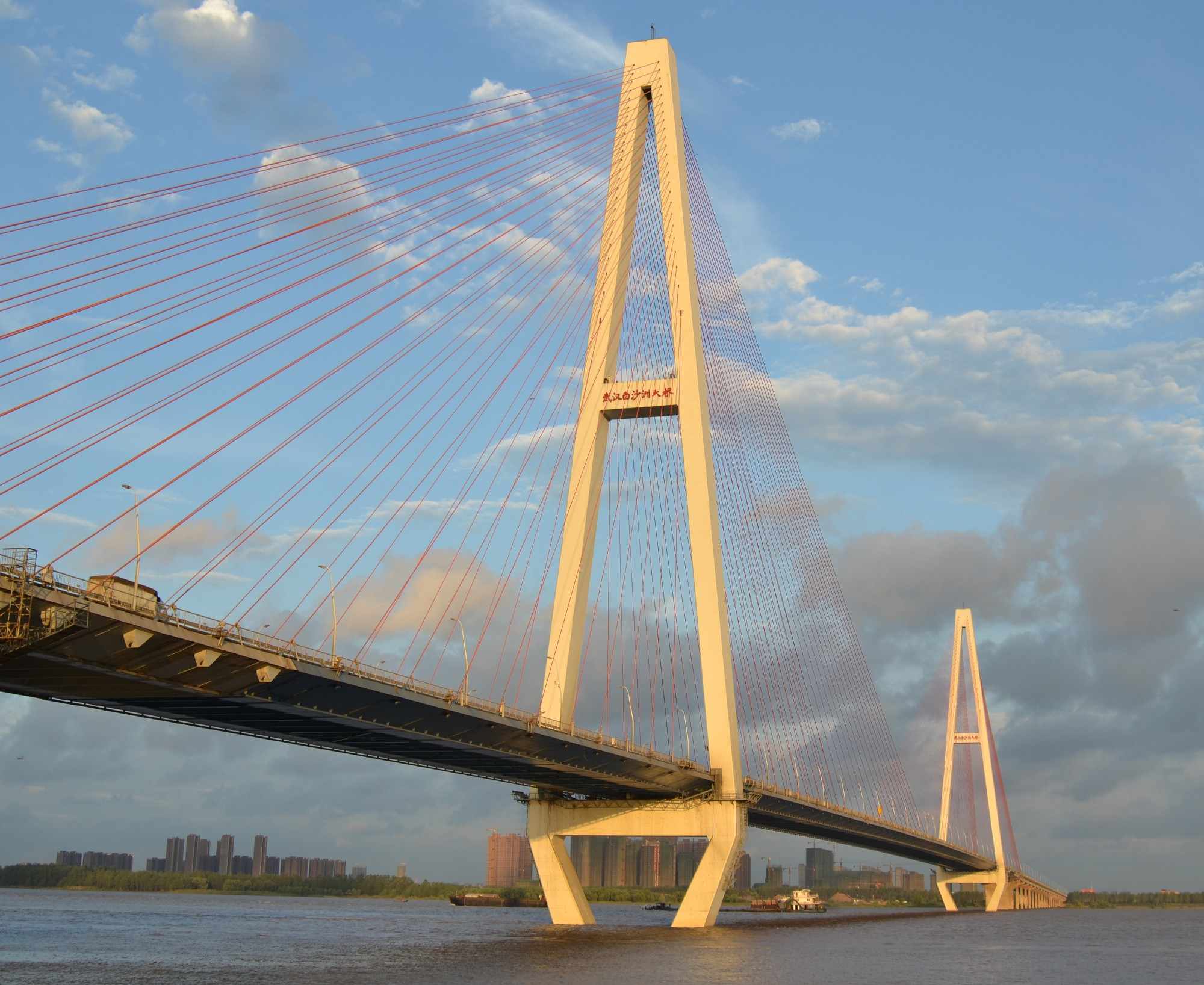
- Coordinates: 30.4846°N 114.2455°E
- Carries: 6 lanes of Wuhan Third Ring Road
- Crosses: Yangtze River
- Locale: Wuhan, Hubei, China
- Other name: Third Wuhan Yangtze River Bridge

Characteristics
- Design: Cable-stayed
- Total length: 3,589 m (11,775 ft)
- Width: 28.5 m (94 ft)
- Height: 174.75 m (573 ft)
- Longest span: 618 m (2,028 ft)

History
- Construction start: 1997
- Construction end: September 2000
- Construction cost: $380 million

Statistics
- Daily traffic: 50,000 vpd

Location
- Interactive map of Baishazhou Yangtze River Bridge

The Baishazhou Yangtze River Bridge (Chinese: 武汉白沙洲长江大桥), sometimes referred as the Third Wuhan Yangtze River Bridge for being the third Yangtze river bridge in Wuhan, is a highway bridge over the Yangtze River in Wuhan, Hubei Province, China. It is located 6.8 kilometres (4 miles) southwest (upstream) of the First Bridge (which connects central Wuchang with central Hanyang). The two bridge names come from the order of construction (it was built after the First and Second Bridges), and from the name of the small island (Baisha Zhou (白沙洲), i.e. "White Sand Island") located under the bridge.

The bridge construction started in 1997 and was completed in September 2000. The final construction cost of the bridge was $380 million. It is 3,586 metres (11,765 ft) long and 28.5 metres (94 ft) wide, has six lanes and a capacity of 50,000 vehicles a day. The bridge serves as a major passage for the Third Ring Road enormously easing the city's traffic and aiding local economic development.

== See also ==
- Bridges and tunnels across the Yangtze River
- List of bridges in China
- List of longest cable-stayed bridge spans
- List of tallest bridges
