= G50 Shanghai–Chongqing Expressway =

Road in western China

Shanghai–Chongqing Expressway
- 上海－重庆高速公路
- Huyu Expressway 沪渝高速公路

Route information
- Length: 1,900 km (1,200 mi)

Major junctions
- East end: S20 Outer Ring Expressway and Yan'an Elevated Road, Shanghai
- G15 – Qingpu District, Shanghai; G1501 – Qingpu District, Shanghai; G1522 – Suzhou, Jiangsu; G25 – Huzhou, Zhejiang; G4211 – Wuhu, Anhui; G5011 – Wuhu, Anhui G3 – Tongling, Anhui; G4212 – Anqing, Anhui; G35 – Qianshan County, Anhui; G70 – Huangmei County, Hubei; G45 – Huangshi, Hubei; G4201 – Wuhan, Hubei; G4 – Wuhan, Hubei; G55 – Jingzhou, Hubei; G42 – Dianjiang County, Chongqing; G5001 – Jiangbei District, Chongqing G65 – Yubei District, Chongqing
- West end: G75 Lanzhou-Haikou Expressway, Jiangbei District, Chongqing

Location
- Country: China

Highway system
- National Trunk Highway System; Primary; Auxiliary; National Highways; Transport in China
| ← G4515 | → G5001 |

The Shanghai–Chongqing Expressway (Chinese: 上海—重庆高速公路), designated as G50 and commonly referred to as the Huyu Expressway (Chinese: 沪渝高速公路) is an east-west bound expressway that connects the cities of Shanghai, China in Yangtze River Delta, and Chongqing in western China. The expressway runs through six provinces/municipalities and adjoin major cities such as Wuhu, Anqing, Wuhan and Yichang, roughly parallel to G42 Shanghai-Chengdu Expressway to its south. The thoroughfare begins at Huqingping Outer Ring Interchange near Hongqiao International Airport, where it meets S20 Outer Ring Expressway in Shanghai, and terminates at an interchange in Jiangbei District, where the highway joins G75 Lanzhou-Haikou Expressway. It is fully complete and spans 1,900 km (1,200 mi) in length.

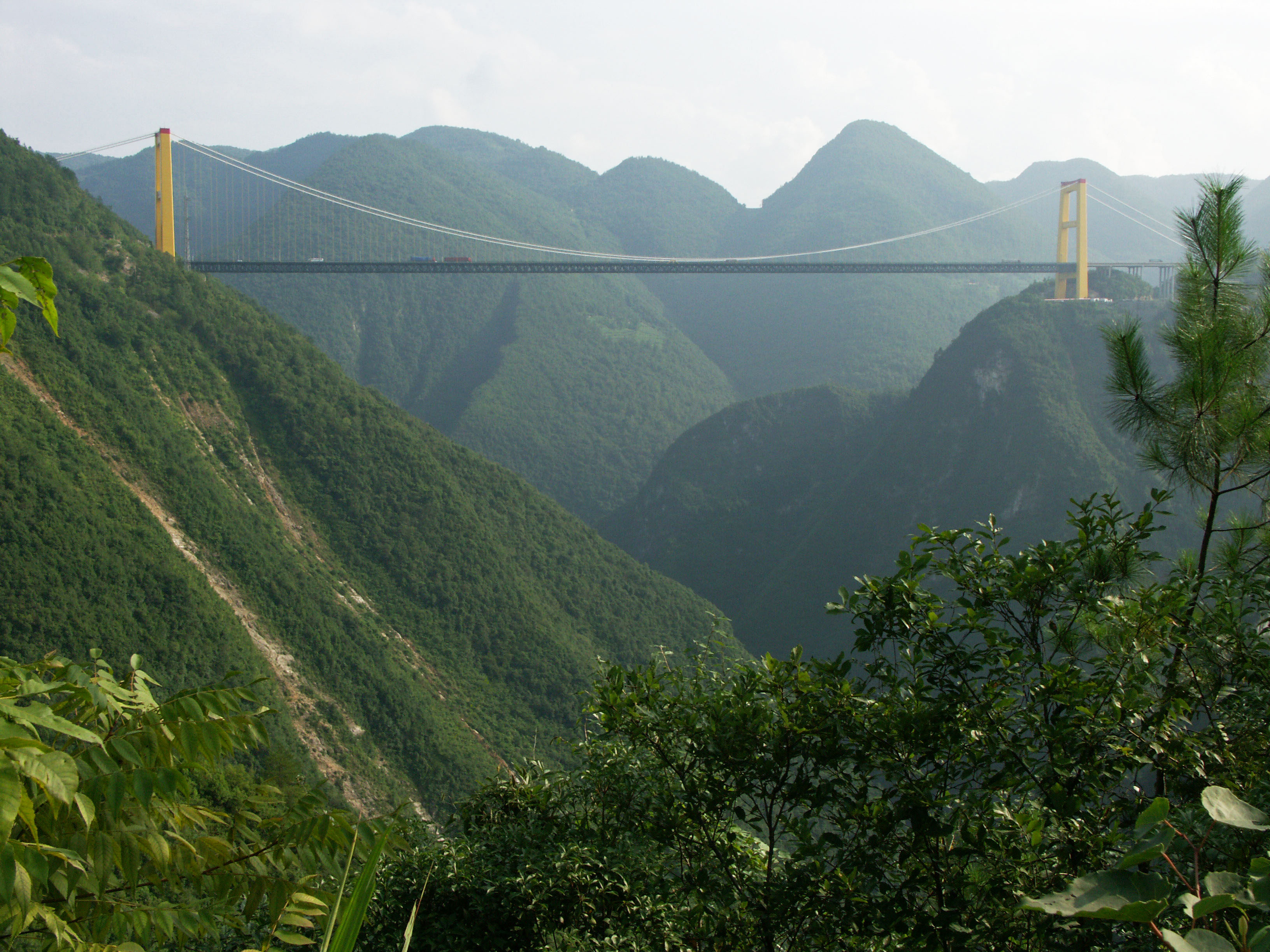
The Sidu River Bridge on the G50 expressway

== Route Description ==
=== Shanghai ===
The Shanghai–Chongqing Expressway begins at an interchange with S20 Outer Ring Expressway and Yan'an Elevated Road near Hongqiao International Airport. It runs as a six-lane freeway to Jiamin Elevated Road, with a speed limit of 80 km/h (50 mph). To the west of Jiamin Elevated Road, G50 becomes a toll road carrying six lanes, with a speed limit of 120 km/h (75 mph). It then intersects with G15 Shenyang-Haikou Expressway via a turbine interchange, and G1501 Shanghai Outer Ring Expressway, before leaving Shanghai near Dianshan Lake.

This portion of G50 was originally named Huqingping Expressway, completed in 2008, and was designated as Route A9. It runs roughly parallel to G318 in Shanghai, which was originally named Huqingping Highway (Chinese: 沪青平公路).

=== Yangtze River Delta Region ===
The expressway dips briefly into Jiangsu as a six-lane expressway with a speed limit of 120 km/h (75 mph). It runs primarily within the border of Wujiang District in Suzhou. It intersects with G15W Changshu–Taizhou Expressway just west of the Beijing-Hangzhou Grand Canal and continues detouring Lake Tai to its south. G50 then enters Zhejiang at the historic town of Nanxun in Nanxun District. In Zhejiang, the expressway becomes a four-lane 120 km/h (75 mph) toll road. After entering Zhejiang in Nanxun District, the expressway passes through the city of Huzhou to the north of city center. At Hongqiao Town to the southeast of Changxin County, G50 meets G25 Changchun-Shenzhen Expressway, and continues westbound until Jiepai Village, where it enters Anhui province.

=== Anhui ===
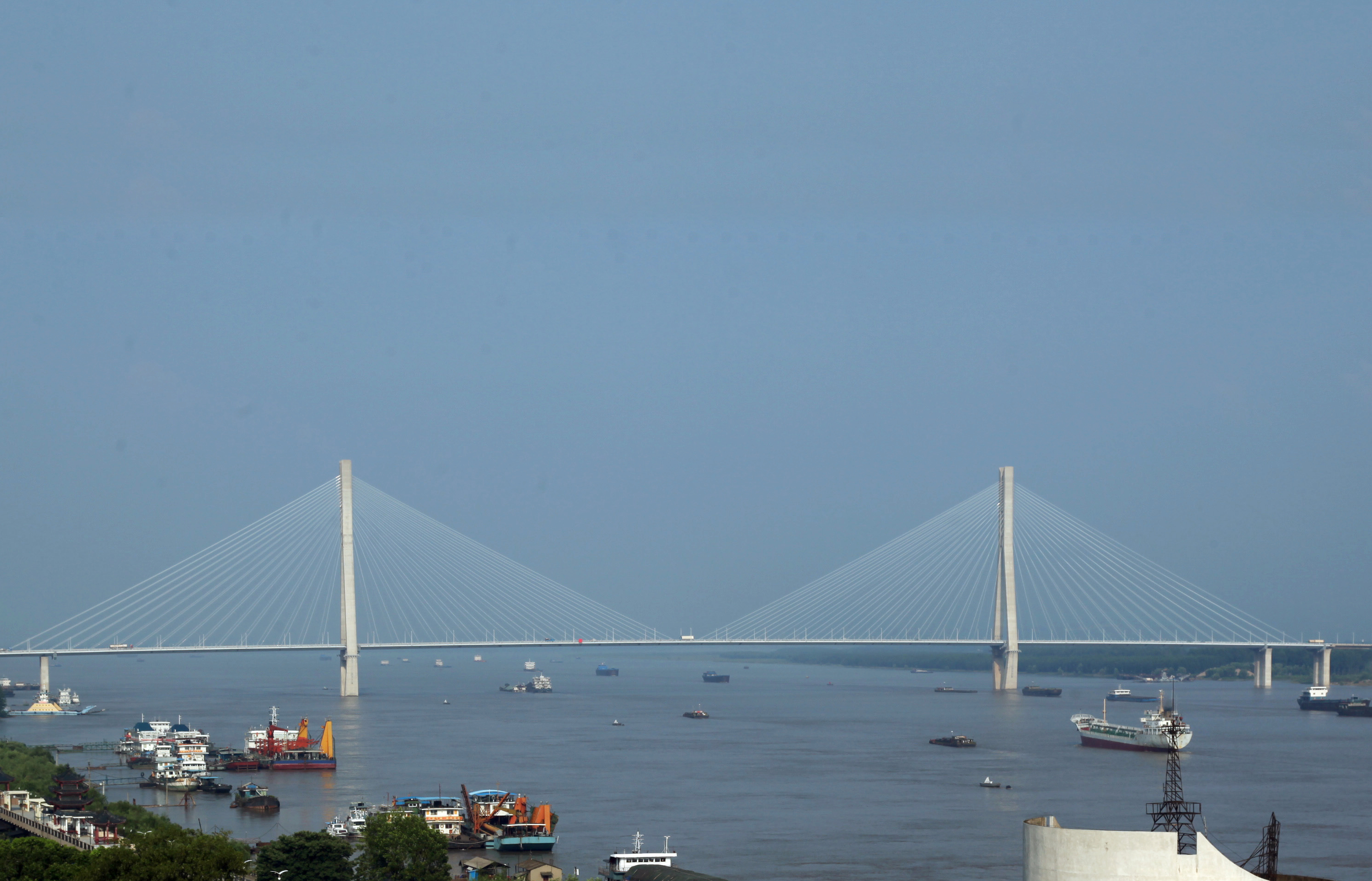
The Anqing Bridge in Anhui, the first of the five bridges over the Yangtze River on the G50 expressway

G50 enters Anhui near Guangde County as a four-lane limited access toll road with a speed limit of 120 km/h (75 mph). It then heads to detour the city of Xuancheng to its south, and heads northwest to Wuhu. At a cloverleaf interchange, the G50 meets G5011 Wuhu–Hefei Expressway and G4211 Nanjing–Wuhu Expressway. Here, the G50 turns south to circumvent Wuhu and follows Yangtze River. The expressway meets G3 Beijing–Taipei Expressway outside of Tongling and continues southwest. Before crossing Yangtze River at Anqing Bridge outside of Anqing, the expressway encounters and concurs with G4212 Hefei–Anqing Expressway and G35 Jinan–Guangzhou Expressway. The Anqing Bridge carries four lanes of the expressway through Yangtze River to the north. G50 then splits with G4212 at a cloverleaf interchange northeast to Huaining County and heads southwest again, following the Yangtze River. After detouring Qianshan County, G50 splits with G35 and continues southwest bound. In Susong County, the expressway tilts westward and enters Hubei province at the border of Huangmei County.

=== Hubei ===
G50 Huyu Expressway in Hubei Province

In Hubei, the expressway becomes a four-lane, 110 km/h (68 mph) toll road. It enters Hubei in Huangmei County. In Huangmei, the expressway meets and concurs with G70 Fuzhou–Yinchuan Expressway, following the curvature of Yangtze River. The expressway then meets and concurs with G45 Daqing–Guangzhou Expressway at an interchange in Xishui County just east of downtown Huangshi, and becomes a six-lane highway, carried across Yangtze River via Huangshi Bridge. The concurrency with G45 ends just west of downtown Huangshi, and the G50-G70 concurrency continues westbound as a four-lane expressway until an interchange at the village of Dawu just outside Wuhan. There, G50 meets Hubei S7 Guanshankou-Baoxie Expressway, splits with G70, and concurs with G4201 Wuhan Outer Ring Expressway, bending away from downtown Wuhan. G50 concurs with most of G4201's southern tier and meets G4 Beijing–Hong Kong and Macau Expressway in Jiangxia District, Wuhan. There, the expressway widens to a six-lane toll road again, and connects with Hubei S11 Qingling-Zhengdian Expressway. The traffic is then carried across Yangtze River via Junshan Bridge. G50 then intersects with Hubei S13 Wuhan-Jianli Expressway and heads northwest to detour downtown Wuhan. G50 splits with G4201 and heads westbound. In Caidian District, G50 meets Hubei S15 Hanyang-Caidian Expressway, but westbound traffic on G50 does not have access to S15 because only two ramps were constructed to accommodate westbound traffic entering G50 from S15 and eastbound traffic leaving G50 to S15. The expressway heads west, passing Xiantao to the south of downtown, and meets the north-south bound Hubei S49 Suizhou-Yueyang Expressway near the town of Maozui. In Jingzhou, G50 passes downtown Jingzhou to the north, and intersects with G55 Erenhot–Guangzhou Expressway. Then, G50 turns southwest to concur with Hubei S63 Laohekou-Shishou Expressway. The remainder of the original Hanyi Expressway(Chinese: 汉宜高速) is designated as Hubei S48 Huting-Yichang Expressway to serve as a connector to downtown Yichang. Four lanes of G50 are then carried across Yangtze River via Yichang Bridge and encounters Hubei S68 Fanba Expressway in Dianjun District. From there, rugged landscape and mountainous terrain of southwestern Hubei necessitates the construction of numerous bridges and tunnels in Changyang Tujia Autonomous County and Enshi Tujia and Miao Autonomous Prefecture. Among the notable bridges in that area are the Longtanhe Bridge, Tieluoping Bridge, Sidu River Bridge, Qingjiang Bridge, and Xuewan Tunnel. A mountain-area speed limit of 80 km/h (50 mph) is imposed along the remainder of G50 in Hubei province. At the village of Baiyangtang, G50 enters Chongqing Municipality.

=== Chongqing ===
In Chongqing, G50 carries some of the most extraordinary long tunnels along its route. The expressway again crosses to the north of the Yangtze over the Zhongxian Huyu Expressway Bridge in Zhong County. The expressway also passes through Dianjiang County and travels southwest bound, meeting G42 Shanghai-Chengdu Expressway, G5001 Chongqing Ring Expressway, and G65 Baotou-Maoming Expressway before reaching its westernmost terminus in Jiangbei District, where G50 meets G75 Lanzhou-Haikou Expressway near Shapucun.

== Major intersections ==
| Province | Exit |
|---|---|
| Shanghai | |
| Shanghai | Hongyu Elevated Road |
| Shanghai | Zhongchun Road |
| Shanghai | Jiamin Elevated Road |
| Shanghai | Xunan Road, Huting North Road |
| Shanghai | G15 Shenyang–Haikou Expressway, East Xulian Road, West Xulian Road |
| Shanghai | Jiasong Middle Road S224 |
| Shanghai | G1501 Shanghai Ring Expressway |
| Shanghai | Qingpu City Center |
| Shanghai | Zhufeng Highway S225 |
| Shanghai | Xicen |
| Shanghai | Jinze exit to China National Highway 318 |
| Jiangsu | Fenhu |
| Jiangsu | G15W2 Changshu–Jiaxing Expressway (under construction) |
| Jiangsu | Beiku |
| Jiangsu | Lili |
| Jiangsu | G15W Changshu–Taizhou Expressway |
| Jiangsu | Pingwang |
| Jiangsu | Hengshan |
| Jiangsu | Qidu exit to Suzhentao Highway S258 |
| Zhejiang | Nanxun |
| Zhejiang | Zhili |
| Zhejiang | Huzhou |
| Zhejiang | Bianshan Tunnel |
| Zhejiang | G25 Changchun–Shenzhen Expressway |
| Zhejiang | Changxing West |
| Zhejiang | Lincheng |
| Zhejiang | S14 Hangzhou-Changxing Expressway |
| Zhejiang | Si'an exit to S204 |
| Anhui | Guangde East exit to China National Highway 318 |
| Anhui | Guangde exit to China National Highway 318, S215 |
| Anhui | G4012 Liyang–Ningde Expressway (under construction) |
| Anhui | Shizipu exit to S214 |
| Anhui | S05 Xuancheng-Tonglu Expressway, S32 Tongling-Xuancheng Expressway |
| Anhui | Xuancheng East exit to S104 |
| Anhui | Xuancheng West exit to China National Highway 318 |
| Anhui | S32 Tongling-Xuancheng Expressway |
| Anhui | Wanzhi, Wuhu County |
| Anhui | S28 Liyang-Wuhu Expressway |
| Anhui | G4211 Nanjing–Wuhu Expressway and G5011 Wuhu–Hefei Expressway in Jinghu District of Wuhu |
| Anhui | Wuhu South exit to China National Highway 205 |
| Anhui | Fanchang County S216 |
| Anhui | Tongling East |
| Anhui | Tongling South |
| Anhui | G3 Beijing–Taipei Expressway |
| Anhui | Guanqian |
| Anhui | Guichi District, Chizhou |
| Anhui | Yinhui |
| Anhui | Dadukou |
| Anhui | S27 Andong Expressway and G4212 Hefei–Anqing Expressway |
| Anhui | Anqing Bridge over the Yangtze River |
| Anhui | Anqing East |
| Anhui | Anqing Airport |
| Anhui | Anqing North |
| Anhui | G4212 Hefei–Anqing Expressway and China National Highway 206 at Huaining |
| Anhui | Qianshan |
| Anhui | G35 Jinan–Guangzhou Expressway |
| Anhui | Taihu |
| Anhui | Susong |
| Hubei | G70 Fuzhou–Yinchuan Expressway at Huangmei |
| Hubei | Wuxue |
| Hubei | Qichun |
| Hubei | Sanhua |
| Hubei | G45 Daqing–Guangzhou Expressway |
| Hubei | E’dong Bridge over the Yangtze River |
| Hubei | Huangshi |
| Hubei | G45 Daqing–Guangzhou Expressway (under construction) |
| Hubei | Tingzu |
| Hubei | China National Highway 106 and China National Highway 316 at Zelin |
| Hubei | Dushan S293 |
| Hubei | Miaoling |
| Hubei | Interchange with G4201 Wuhan Ring Expressway, G70 Fuzhou–Yinchuan Expressway, and S8 Guanbao Expressway |
| Hubei | Phoenix Mountain exit |
| Hubei | Jiangxia |
| Hubei | Interchange with G4 Beijing–Hong Kong and Macau Expressway and South Wuhan exit on to China National Highway 107 |
| Hubei | S11 Qingzheng Expressway |
| Hubei | Jinkou exit |
| Hubei | Yangtze River over the Junshan Bridge |
| Hubei | S13 Wujian Expressway |
| Hubei | Junshan |
| Hubei | G4 Beijing–Hong Kong and Macau Expressway, G4201 Wuhan Ring Expressway and China National Highway 318 |
| Hubei | Caidian District |
| Hubei | S15 Hancai Expressway |
| Hubei | Beihe exit |
| Hubei | Xiantao |
| Hubei | S49 Suiyue Expressway |
| Hubei | Qianjiang S247 |
| Hubei | Qianjiang West S219 |
| Hubei | Yajiao exit |
| Hubei | Shashi District in Jingzhou |
| Hubei | G55 Erenhot–Guangzhou Expressway |
| Hubei | Jingzhou District |
| Hubei | Zhijiang S256 |
| Hubei | Anfusi S325 |
| Hubei | Xiaoting and Yichang Airport |
| Hubei | G42 Shanghai–Chengdu Expressway and S48 Huyi Expressway |
| Hubei | Xiaoting |
| Hubei | Yichang Bridge over the Yangtze River |
| Hubei | Honghuatao |
| Hubei | S68 Fanba Expressway |
| Hubei | Changyang |
| Hubei | Biandanya Tunnel |
| Hubei | Weijiazhou Bridge |
| Hubei | Yuquanxi Tunnel |
| Hubei | Hejiaping |
| Hubei | Jinlong Tunnel |
| Hubei | Longtanhe River Viaduct |
| Hubei | Tieluoping Bridge |
| Hubei | Shuanghekou Bridge |
| Hubei | Baziling Tunnel |
| Hubei | Sidu River Bridge |
| Hubei | Yesanguan Tunnel |
