= List of universities and colleges in Chongqing =

The following is a list of universities and colleges in Chongqing, China.

Name	Chinese name	Type
Chongqing University	重庆大学	National (Direct)
Chongqing University of Posts and Telecommunications	重庆邮电大学	Municipal
Chongqing Jiaotong University	重庆交通大学	Municipal
Chongqing Medical University	重庆医科大学	Municipal
Southwest University	西南大学	National (Direct)
Chongqing Normal University	重庆师范大学	Municipal
Chongqing University of Arts and Science	重庆文理学院	Municipal
Chongqing Three Gorges University	重庆三峡学院	Municipal
Yangtze Normal University	长江师范大学	Municipal
Sichuan International Studies University	四川外国语大学	Municipal
Southwest University of Political Science and Law	西南政法大学	Municipal
Sichuan Fine Arts Institute	四川美术学院	Municipal
Chongqing University of Science and Technology	重庆科技学院	Municipal
Chongqing University of Technology	重庆理工大学	Municipal
Chongqing Technology and Business University	重庆工商大学	Municipal
Chongqing Institute of Engineering	重庆工程学院	Private
City College of Science and Technology, Chongqing University	重庆大学城市科技学院	Private
Chongqing Police College	重庆警察学院	Municipal
Chongqing College of Humanities, Science and Technology	重庆人文科技学院	Private
Chongqing Institute of Foreign Studies (formerly Chongqing Nanfang Translators College, Sichuan International Studies University)	四川外国语大学重庆南方翻译学院	Private
Foreign Trade and Business College, Chongqing Normal University	重庆师范大学涉外商贸学院	Private
Rongzhi College, Chongqing Technology and Business University	重庆工商大学融智学院	Private
Pass College, Chongqing Technology and Business University	重庆工商大学派斯学院	Private
College of Mobile Telecommunications, Chongqing University of Posts and Telecommunications	重庆邮电大学移通学院	Private
Chongqing University of Education	重庆第二师范学院	Municipal
