= President Jiang =

President Jiang may refer to:

- Jiang Chongjing (1916–2019), Chinese politician and academic administrator president of the Northwestern Polytechnical University and Chongqing University of Technology
- Jiang Hua (1907–1999), Chinese politician, President of the Supreme People's Court of China
- Jiang Jianqing (born 1953), president of the Bank of Shanghai (1995), president of ICBC Shanghai Branch (1997) and president of Chinese Communist Party Committee Secretary of ICBC (2005)
- Jiang Menglin (1886–1964), Chinese educator, writer, and politician, President of Peking University and President of National Chekiang University
- Jiang Ping (1930–2023), Chinese legal scholar, President of China University of Political Science and Law
- Jiang Shaoji (1919–1995), Chinese internist and gastroenterologist, president of Chinese Society of Gastroenterology
- Jiang Ximing (1913–1990), Chinese zoologist and politician, president of Hangzhou Normal College
- Jiang Yi-huah (born 1960), Taiwanese politician, 25th President of Executive Yuan of the Republic of China
- Jiang Zemin (1926–2022), 5th President of the People's Republic of China and General Secretary of the Chinese Communist Party (1989-2002)
- Hanqing Jiang (born 1975), Chinese researcher, president of Society of Engineering Sciences (2022)

== See also ==
- Jiang (surname)
- President Chiang (disambiguation), several presidents of the Republic of China
