= Yinglong Lake National Wetland Park =

Park in Chongqing, China

- Type: Urban park, Wetland
- Location: Chongqing, China
- Area: 222.15 hectares (548.9 acres)

Yinglong Lake National Wetland Park is located in Nan'an District, Chongqing. It is a major suburban wetland park, educational base and protected area in Chongqing. This park is based on the western shore of Yinglong Lake, a reservoir lake built in 2003, which covers an area of more than 90 square kilometers. It is about 28 kilometers away from the downtown Chongqing. The wetland and the lake are strictly protected because they are the back-up water source of this city. The wetland park is open to public, and it is purposed to give people opportunities to view the scenic wetland and see wetland species, and to educate people to protect wetlands and water sources.
