= Chongqing No.7 high School =

Chongqing No.7 High School
- 重庆第七中学校
- Shapingba, Chongqing; China

Information
- Type: Public
- Motto: Aspiration Practicality Diligence Obedience
- Established: 1758
- Principal: Hong Deng
- Faculty: 324
- Grades: 7-12
- Enrollment: 4000
- Campus size: 130 acres (53 ha)
- Campus type: Urban

Chongqing No.7 High School (simplified Chinese: 重庆第七中学校; traditional Chinese: 重慶第七中學校; pinyin: chóng qìng di qi zhōng xué xiào) is a co-educational public school offers 7-12 grade courses, located in downtown Shapingba, Chongqing, China. It is a key school designated by Education Commission of the Chongqing Municipal Government.

It's also one of the few public schools in Chongqing that enroll international students as part of a government pilot program. The school claim its history can be traced back to the Jinyun Study founded in 1758. Later, in the Republic of China period, the school had been relocated, renamed, and regrouped for several times. After 260 years of adventure, the school finally settled in at its current campus.
