= Nondestructive Testing and Evaluation =

Scientific journal

- Discipline: Nondestructive testing
- Language: English
- Edited by: Gui Yun Tian

Publication details
- Former name: Nondestructive Testing Communications
- History: 1989—present
- Publisher: Taylor & Francis
- Frequency: Monthly
- Impact factor: 4.2 (2024)

Standard abbreviations
- ISO 4: Nondestr. Test. Eval.

Indexing
- CODEN: NTEVEP
- ISSN: 1058-9759

Links
- Journal homepage; Online access; Online archive

Nondestructive Testing and Evaluation is a peer-reviewed scientific journal published monthly by Taylor & Francis. Established in 1989 under the title Nondestructive Testing Communications, it covers research in nondestructive testing and related areas. Its current editor-in-chief is Gui Yun Tian (Chongqing University of Technology).

== Abstracting and indexing ==
The journal is abstracted and indexed in:

- Current Contents/Engineering, Computing & Technology
- EBSCO databases
- Ei Compendex
- Inspec
- ProQuest databases
- Science Citation Index Expanded
- Scopus

According to the Journal Citation Reports, the journal has a 2024 impact factor of 4.2.
