= Yan Chunfeng =

Chinese politician

- 严春风

Deputy Communist Party Secretary of Guang'an
- In office November 2016 – May 2018
- Party Secretary: Hou Xiaochun

Vice-Mayor of Guang'an
- In office August 2015 – November 2016
- Leader: Luo Zengbin (mayor)

Deputy Head of Ngawa Tibetan and Qiang Autonomous Prefecture
- In office May 2010 – December 2011

Personal details
- Born: April 1968 (age 58) Ruichang, Jiangxi, China
- Party: Chinese Communist Party (expelled; 1988-2018)
- Spouse(s): Zhang Jing; Li Xiangyang
- Children: 2
- Education: Kunming University of Science and Technology; Chongqing University

Chinese name
- Traditional Chinese: 嚴春風
- Simplified Chinese: 严春风
Transcriptions
Standard Mandarin
- Hanyu Pinyin: Yán Chūnfēng

Yan Chunfeng (Chinese: 严春风; born April 1968) is a former Chinese politician who spent his entire career in southwest China's Sichuan province. Yan was in the spotlight on May 10, 2018 after a conflict involving his daughter's kindergarten teacher in Chengdu, Sichuan, was made known online. He was investigated by the Central Commission for Discipline Inspection in May 2018. Previously he served as Chinese Communist Party Deputy Committee Secretary of Guang'an, the birthplace of China's former paramount leader Deng Xiaoping.

== Early life and education ==
Yan was born in Ruichang, Jiangxi in April 1968. After resuming the college entrance examination in 1984, he studied, and then taught, at what is now Kunming University of Science and Technology. In 1995 he entered Chongqing University, earning his doctor's degree in Geotechnical Engineer.

== Career ==
In January 1999 he was appointed as assistant president of Chongqing Research Institute of Building Science (CRIBS), but having held the position for only seven months. In August of that same year, he was transferred to Yibin and entered politics as a local official. He was Chinese Communist Party Deputy Committee Secretary and district head of Cuiping District from March 2005 to August 2006. In August 2006 he was transferred again to Chengdu, capital of southwest China's Sichuan province, where he served as chief engineer of Chengdu Municipal Planning Administration. In May 2010 he became deputy head of Ngawa Tibetan and Qiang Autonomous Prefecture, a position he held until December 2011. He was deputy director of the Sichuan Provincial Department of Housing and Urban Rural Development in November 2014, and held that office until July 2015. Then he was transferred to Guang'an, where he was Chinese Communist Party Deputy Committee Secretary between November 2016 and May 2018.

== Downfall ==
On May 10, 2018, Yan's daughter beat her classmates and then was admonished by the kindergarten teacher. Yan's wife Li Xiangyang oppressed the kindergarten teacher with privileges, causing public indignation on the Internet.

On May 18, 2018, Yan Chunfeng was put under investigation for alleged "serious violations of discipline and laws", said one-sentence statement issued by the ruling Chinese Communist Party (CCP)'s Central Commission for Discipline Inspection (CCDI).

On November 12, 2018, Yan Chunfeng had been expelled from the CCP and removed from the government over graft allegations and his case was handed over to prosecutors.

On April 11, 2019, his trial was held at the Deyang Intermediate People's Court. Prosecutors said that between 2001 and 2008, he took advantage of the convenience and power associated with his various posts in Yibin, Chengdu and Guang'an to help others profit in project contracting and dispute resolution. In return, he accepted money and property worth 5.7 million yuan ($886,849). On August 2, Yan was sentenced to 10 years for taking bribes of more than 5.7 million yuan ($886,849) in Deyang Intermediate People's Court.

== Personal life ==
In November 2007 Yan Chunfeng and his wife Zhang Jing (张静; 張靜) divorced because of their discord. They have a son named Yan Hanlin (严瀚林; 嚴瀚林), who is studying at Chongqing Technology and Business University (CTBU).

Yan married Li Xiangyang (李向阳; 李向陽) in November 2011, the couple had a daughter named Yan Wenjun (严文君; 嚴文君). The couple divorced in December 2013.
