= Nan'an, Chongqing =

Coordinates: 29.5347°N 106.563°E

Nan'an 南岸区
- District
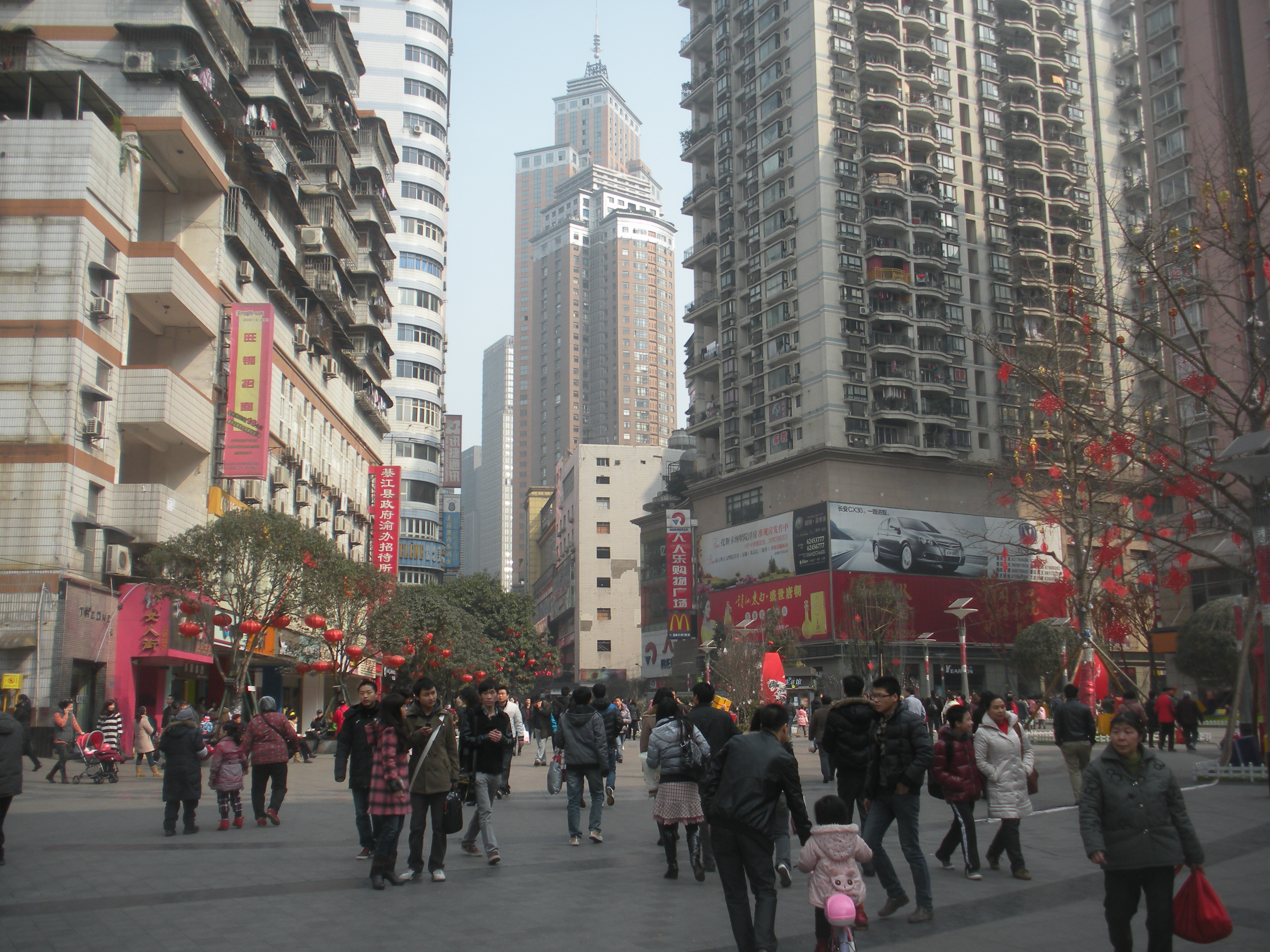
- Nanping CBD pedestrian mall in Nan'an.

- Nan'an District in Chongqing
- Country: People's Republic of China
- Municipality: Chongqing

Area
  - Total: 262.43 km^{2} (101.32 sq mi)

Population
  - Total: 891,000
  - Density: 3,400/km^{2} (8,790/sq mi)
- Time zone: UTC+8 (China Standard)

Nan'an District (Chinese: 南岸区; pinyin: Nán'àn Qū; Jyutping: naam4ngon6 keoi1; lit. 'the southern bank of Yangtze River') is one of the six central districts of Chongqing municipality, China. It covers an area of 262.43 km^{2}, with 44 km^{2} covered with forests and woods. It has an estimated population of 891,000 in late 2017.

== Geography ==
The Yangtze River curves around the north and west border of Nan'an district for about 45 kilometers. The river separates Nan'an from its neighbouring districts such as Jiulongpo, Yuzhong, Jiangbei, and Yubei. The bridges crossing the Yangtze River are the primary passage for transportations to and from the other side of the river. Ferries are also available as a backup and they used to be the only connection to the central part of downtown Chongqing before the first bridge was built in the early 1980s. Nan'an shares the border on the south and east land area with Banan.

== History ==
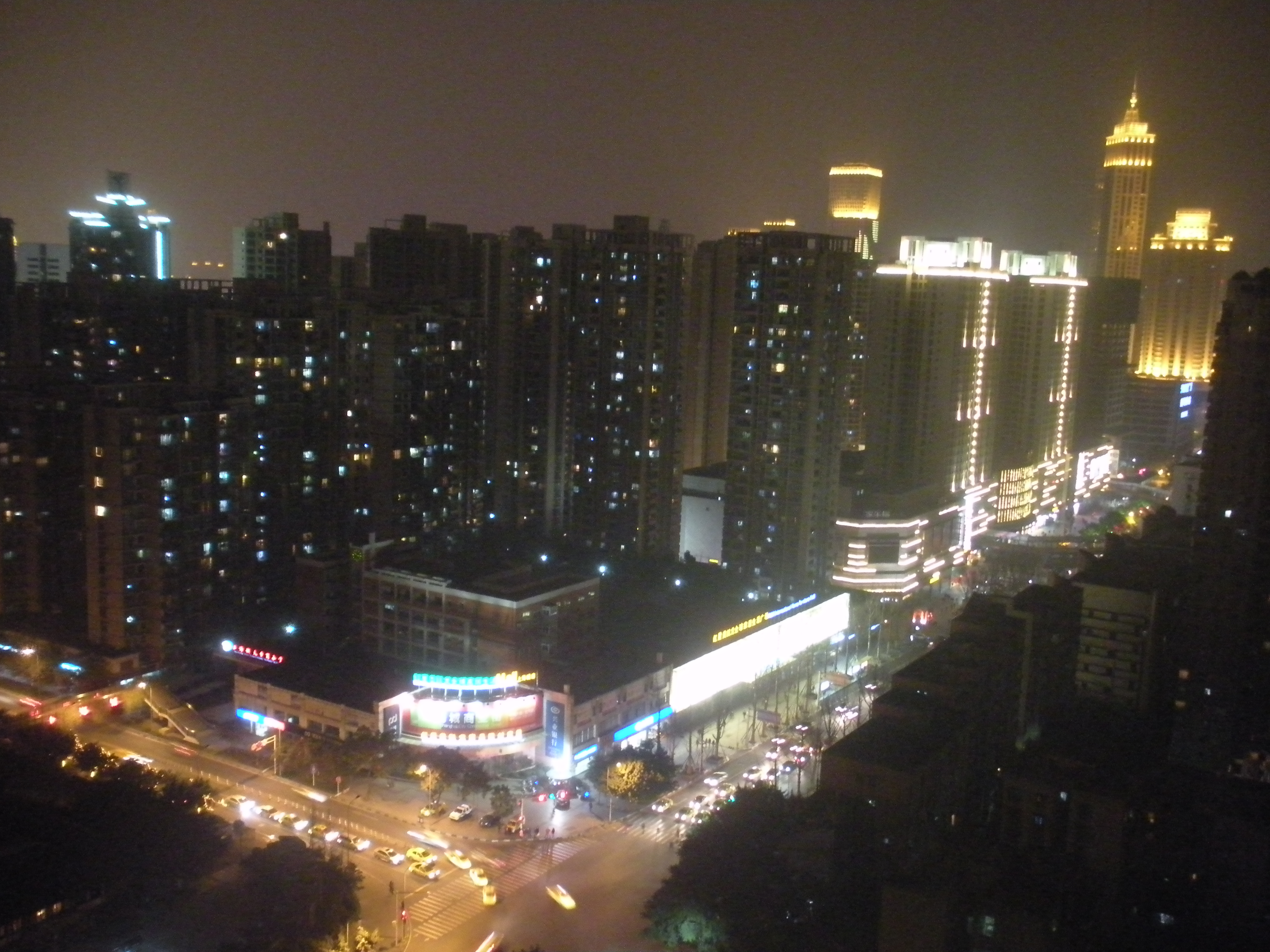
Night view of Nan'an.

Nan'an district is one important part of the historical city Chongqing. It was first established in 1929 as an administrative region when the city underwent expansions. At that time, it covers the current Nanping, Haitangxi, Longmenhao, and Danzishi Subdistricts. With series changes to its covering area and naming from the year 1929 through 1950, Nan'an got its current name in October 1955.

== Administrative divisions ==
Name	Chinese (S)	Hanyu Pinyin	Population (2010)	Area (km^{2})
Tongyuanju Subdistrict	铜元局街道	Tóngyuánjú Jiēdào	49,972	2.9
Huayuan Road Subdistrict	花园路街道	Huāyuánlù Jiēdào	98,320	4.4
Nanping Subdistrict	南坪街道	Nánpíng Jiēdào	113,193	3.6
Haitangxi Subdistrict	海棠溪街道	Hǎitángxī Jiēdào	110,310	4.1
Longmenhao Subdistrict	龙门浩街道	Lóngménhào Jiēdào	27,615	1.7
Danzishi Subdistrict	弹子石街道	Dànzǐshí Jiēdào	36,299	1
Nanshan Subdistrict	南山街道	Nánshān Jiēdào	56,888	33
Nanping town	南坪镇	Nánpíng Zhèn	97,081	16.7
Tushan town	涂山镇	Túshān Zhèn	53,146	7.1
Jiguanshi town	鸡冠石镇	Jīguānshí Zhèn	16,053	15.4
Xiakou town	峡口镇	Xiákǒu Zhèn	11,787	31.6
Changshengqiao town	长生桥镇	Chángshēngqiáo Zhèn	57,960	65.6
Yinglong town	迎龙镇	Yínglóng Zhèn	16,319	45.72
Guangyang town	广阳镇	Guǎngyáng Zhèn	14,627	37.1

== Education ==
Nan'an district is the home of five colleges and over ten national or provincial research institutes including Chongqing University of Posts and Telecommunications, Chongqing Technology and Business University, Chongqing Jiaotong University, Chongqing Education College, Chongqing Pharmaceutical Research Institute, etc.

== Tourist attractions ==
Nan'an is best known for its abundance of natural and historical tourist attractions. In particular, the Nanshan (南山, Southern Mountains), a mountain ridge running along the southeast border of the district, provides scenic trails and sweeping view of the city. The Ciyun Temple (慈云寺), Tushan Temple (涂山寺), and Laojun Cave (老君洞) were built in as early as the Tang dynasty. Nanwenquan (Southern Hot Spring) is a hot spring for relaxation. There are also rowing boats. Yikeshu (一棵树; 'Single-Tree') sightseeing spot provides a panorama of Chongqing. Foreigners' Street is an amusement park that includes the world's largest toilet, the Porcelain Palace.

== Transportation ==
=== Bridges ===
The majority of western and northern borders of Nan'an district is wrapped by the Yangtze River, therefore necessitating several connections between the busy districts of central Chongqing. Nan'an is connected to Jiulongpo district by the Egongyan Bridge, and is connected to Yuzhong district by the Caiyuanba Bridge, the historic Shibanpo Yangtze River Bridge (and the later double-line bridge), and the Dongshuimen Bridge. The world's longest through arch bridge, the Chaotianmen Bridge, connects Nan'an to Jiangbei district. Two expressway bridges, Dafosi Bridge (G65, also part of the Chongqing Inner Ring Expressway) and Yuzui Yangtze River Bridge (G5001, a.k.a. Chongqing Ring Expressway), connect Nan'an to Jiangbei and Yubei districts. The latest addition to the bridges, Cuntan Yangtze River Bridge, opened on December 31, 2017, connecting Nan'an to Jiangbei district; its completion significantly reduces commute time to Jiangbei International Airport to around 10 minutes. It is also the location of Huangjuewan interchange, which connects Chongqing Jiangbei Airport main connecting road with the city proper.

=== Public transportation ===
==== Chongqing Rail Transit ====
As of August 2020, Nan'an is currently serviced by Line 3, 6, and the Loop Line as part of the expanding Chongqing Rail Transit network:

- Line 3 (monorail) stations: Tongyuanju, Gongmao, Nanping, Sigongli, Chongqing Technology and Business University, Liugongli, Chongqing Jiaotong University.
- Line 6 (heavy rail) stations: Shangxinjie, Liujiaping, Changshengqiao, Qiujiawan, Chayuan.
- Loop line (heavy rail) stations: Danzishi, Tushan, Renji, Shangxinjie, Shanghao (U/C), Haitangxi, Luojiaba, Nanping, Nanhu, Haixialu.

==== Buses ====
Various bus routes are operated by Chongqing Public Transport with relatively comprehensive coverage in Nan'an. Sigongli Traffic Hub, adjacent to Sigongli station of Chongqing Rail Transit, provides long-distance bus services.

==== Ferries ====
Ferries are regularly scheduled from Danzishi to Chaotianmen in Yuzhong District across the Yangtze River.

=== Cableway ===
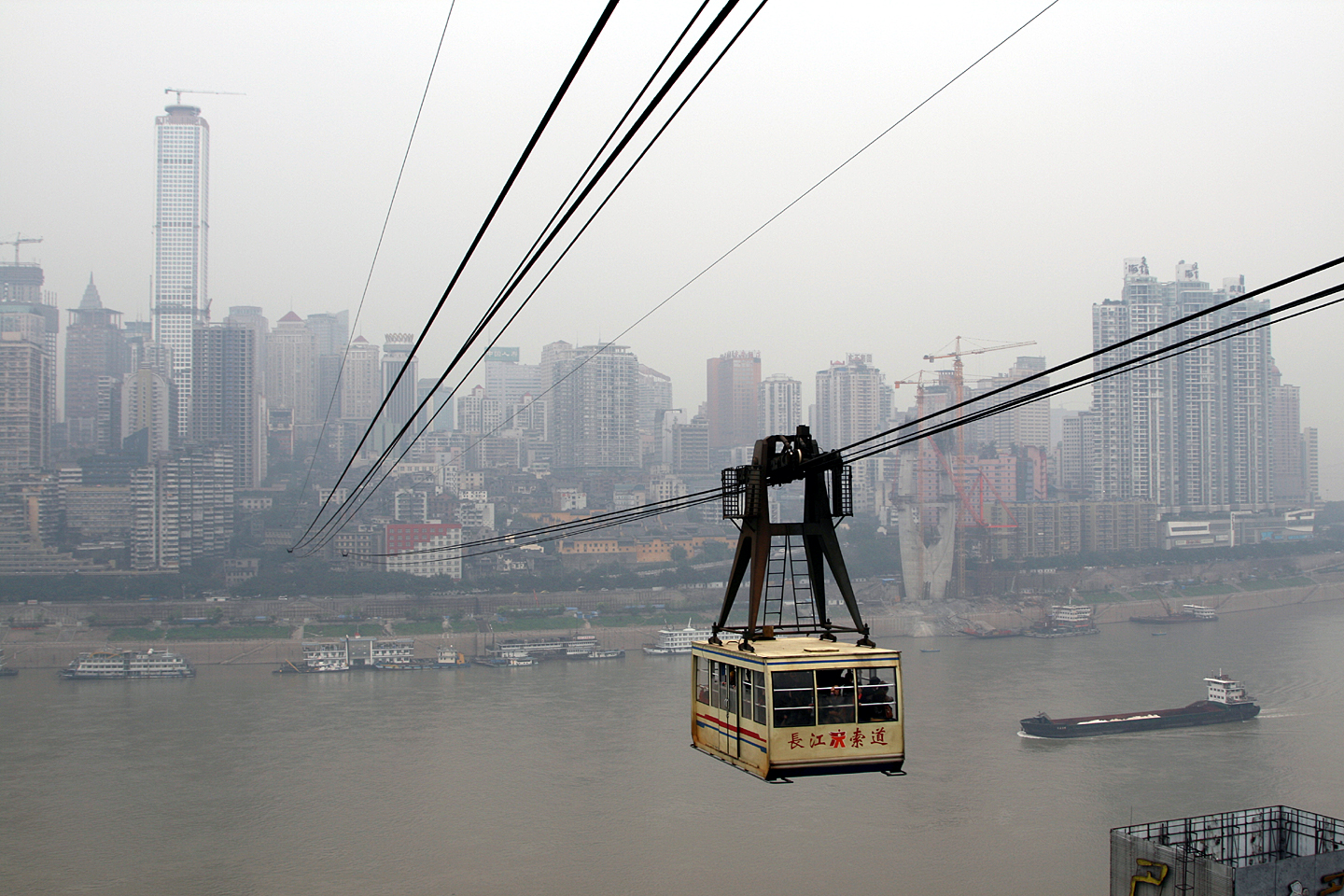
Yangtze River Ropeway with Yuzhong in the background

Spanning 1166 meters across the Yangtze River, the Yangtze River Cableway is a scenic staple of Chongqing. Opened in 1987, the cableway has two stations on either side of the river: the south Longmenhao station is located in Nan'an and north Xinhua Road Station in Yuzhong district.

== Demographics ==
According to the Seventh National Census in 2020, the city's Permanent Population (hukou) was 1,197,639. Compared with 759,570 people in the Sixth National Census in 2010, the population increased by 438,069 people, an increase of 57.67%, with an average annual growth rate of 4.66%.
