= Xiakou, Chongqing =

Xiakou 峡口镇
- Town
- Location in Chongqing
- Coordinates: 29°33′58″N 106°40′6″E
- Country: People's Republic of China
- Direct-administered municipality: Chongqing
- District: Nan'an District
- Time zone: UTC+8 (China Standard)

Xiakou (simplified Chinese: 峡口; traditional Chinese: 峽口; pinyin: Xiákǒu) is a town under the administration of Nan'an District, Chongqing, China. As of 2018, it has one residential community and 6 villages under its administration.

== See also ==
- List of township-level divisions of Chongqing
