= Shandong Subdistrict =

Shandong Subdistrict 山洞街道
- Subdistrict
- Location in Chongqing
- Coordinates: 29°30′53″N 106°25′4″E
- Country: People's Republic of China
- Direct-Administered Municipality: Chongqing
- District: Shapingba District
- Time zone: UTC+8 (China Standard)

Shandong Subdistrict (Chinese: 山洞街道; pinyin: Shāndòng Jiēdào) is a subdistrict in Shapingba District, Chongqing, China. As of 2020, it has 2 residential communities under its administration: Shandong and Linyuan (林园).

== See also ==
- List of township-level divisions of Chongqing
