= Dafosi Bridge =

Dafosi Yangtze River Bridge 重庆长江大佛寺大桥
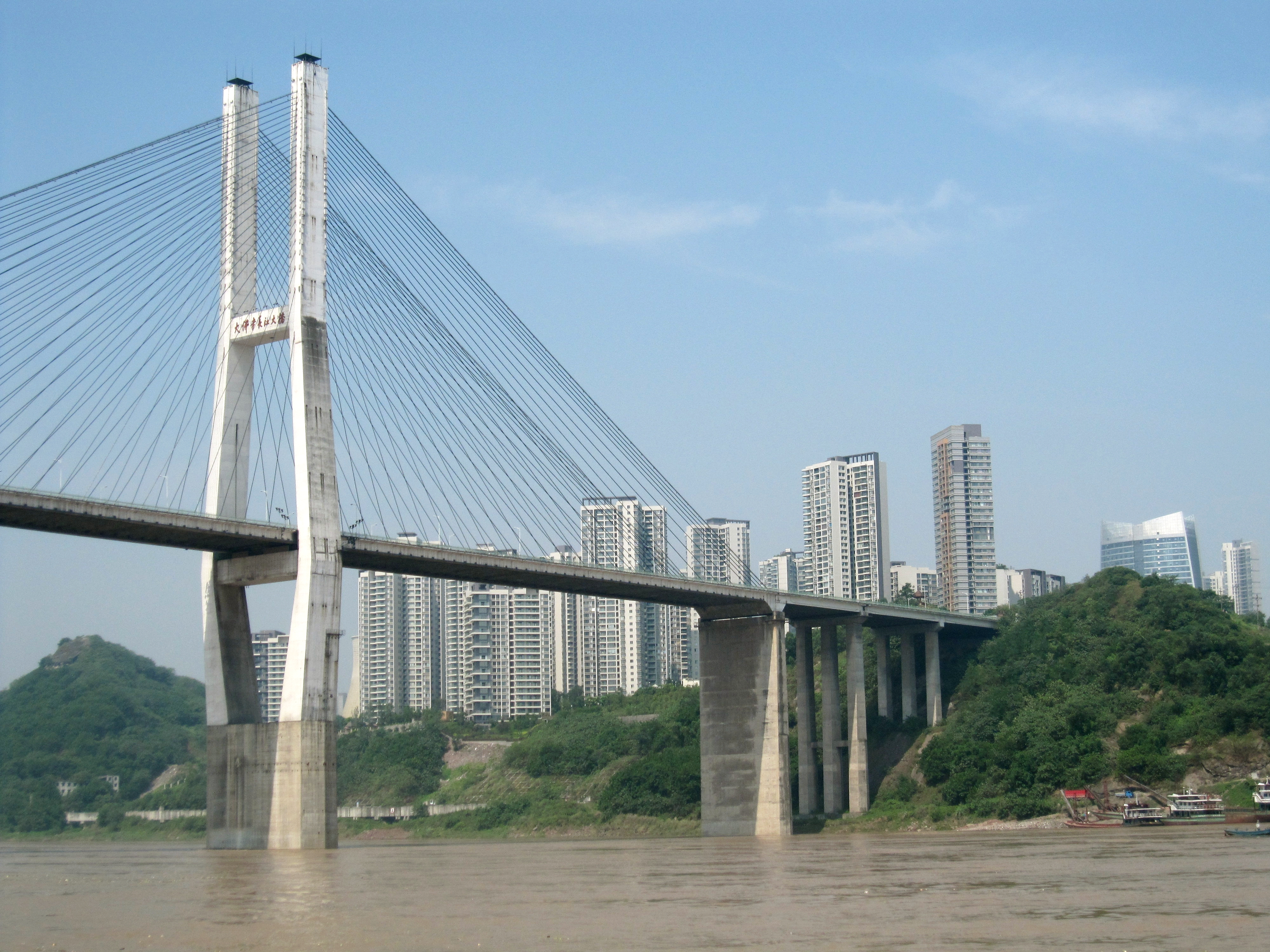
- Coordinates: 29°36′22″N 106°34′57″E
- Carries: G65 Baomao Expressway
- Crosses: Yangtze River
- Locale: Chongqing, China

Characteristics
- Design: Cable-stayed
- Total length: 1,176 metres (3,858 ft)
- Height: 206.68 metres (678.1 ft)
- Longest span: 450 metres (1,480 ft)

History
- Construction start: 18 November 1997
- Opened: 26 December 2001

Location
- Interactive map of Dafosi Yangtze River Bridge

The Dafosi Yangtze River Bridge is a cable-stayed bridge spanning 450 metres (1,480 ft) over the Yangtze River in Chongqing, China. The bridge carries 6 lanes of traffic on the G65 Baotou–Maoming Expressway between the Nan'an District east of the Yangtze River and the Jiangbei District to the west.

== See also ==
- Bridges and tunnels across the Yangtze River
- List of bridges in China
- List of longest cable-stayed bridge spans
- List of tallest bridges in the world
