= Sanxia Square =

Square in Chongqing, China

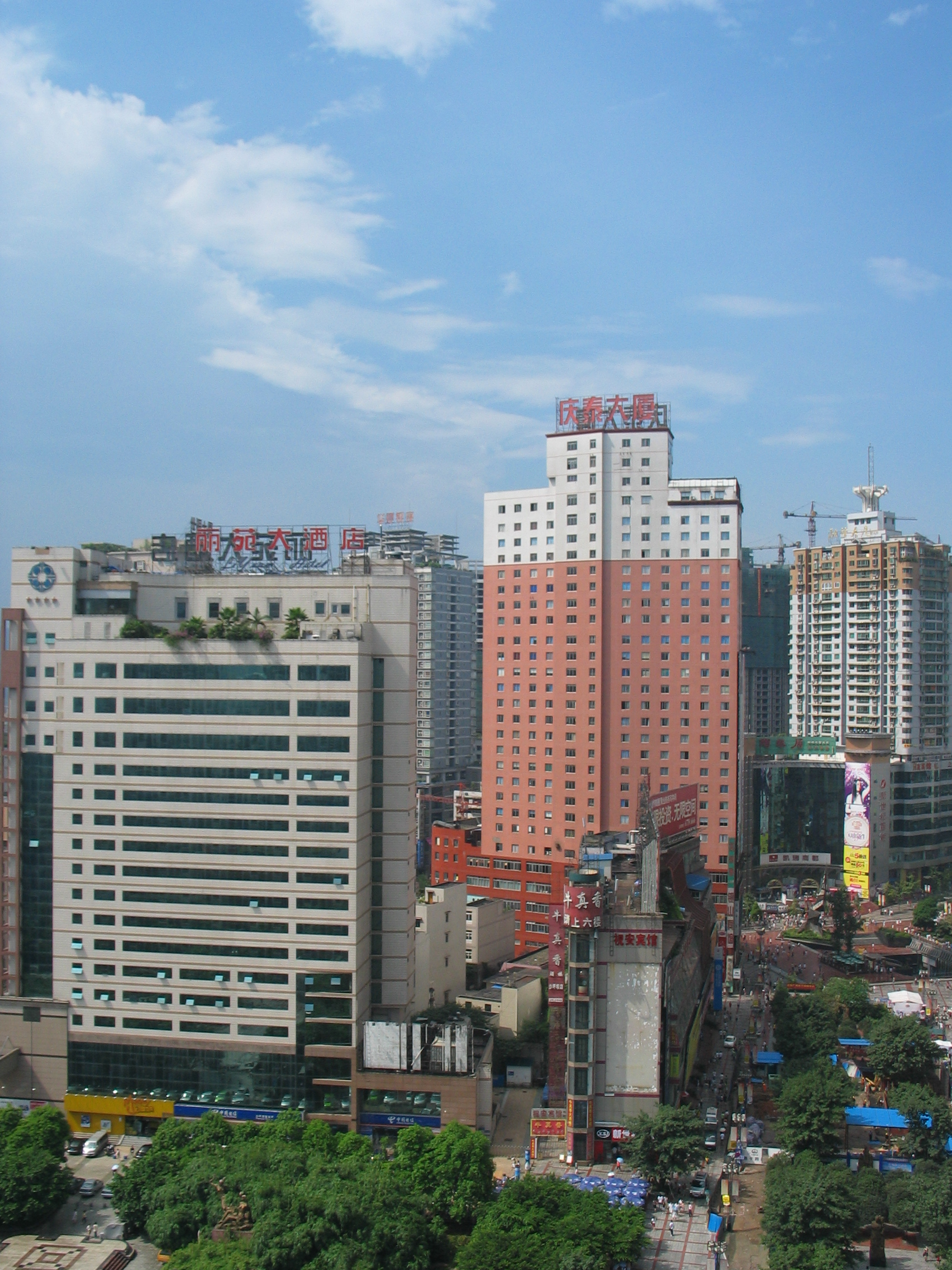
The Sanxia Square in Shapingba

The Sanxia Square (Simplified Chinese: 三峡广场; pinyin: Sānxiá Guǎngchǎng; meaning Three Gorges Square) is located in the downtown Shapingba, 80,000 square meters in area, and has a form of cross. It consists of 4 parts: the garden of the Three Gorges landscape (三峡景观园), the garden of sculptures (名人雕塑园), the garden of green art (绿色艺术园), and the street of culture and commerce (商业文化街).
