= Tushan, Chongqing =

Tushan 涂山镇
- Town
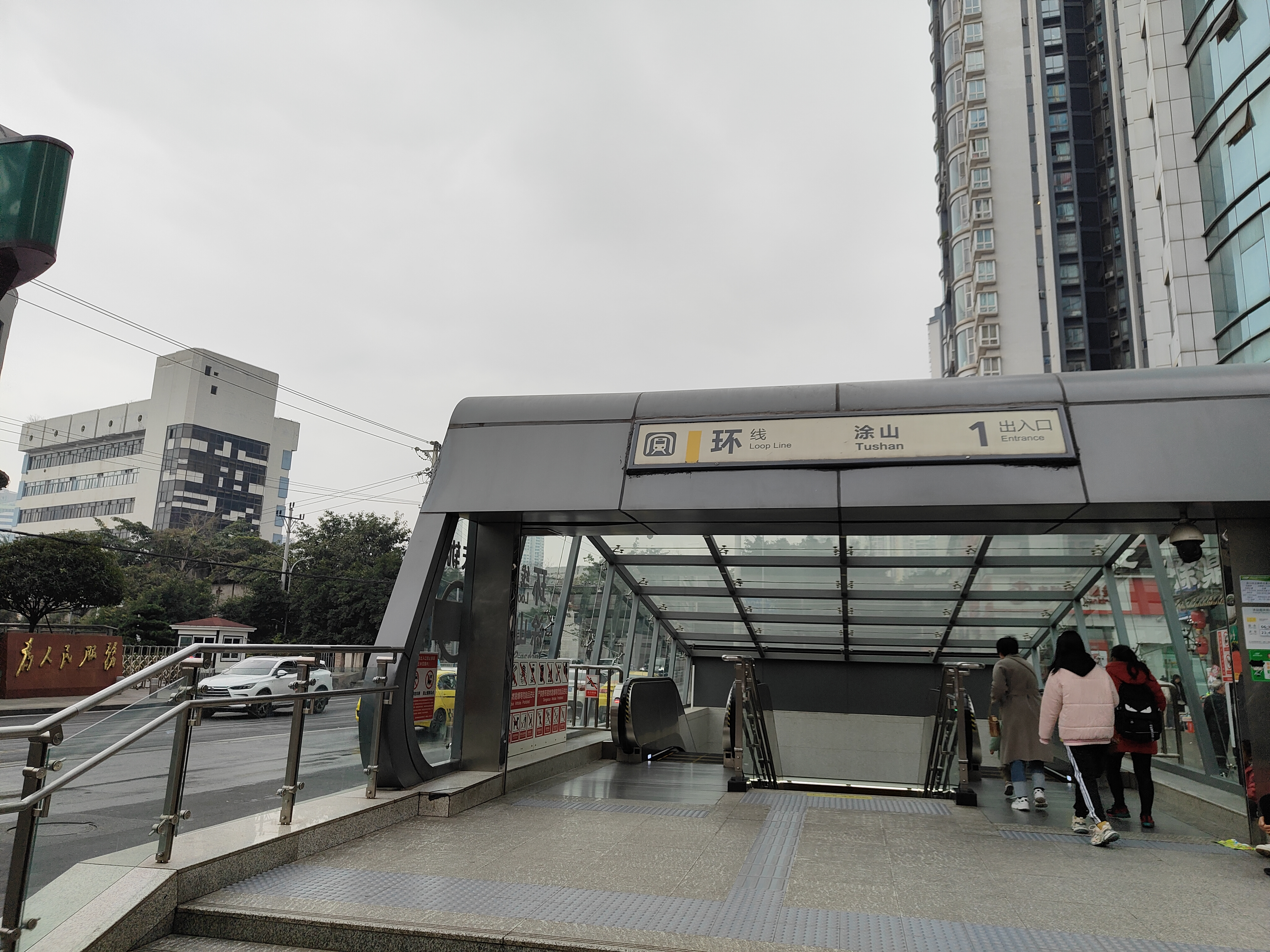
- Tushan station

- Location in Chongqing
- Coordinates: 29°34′49″N 106°35′55″E
- Country: People's Republic of China
- Direct-administered municipality: Chongqing
- District: Nan'an District
- Time zone: UTC+8 (China Standard)

Tushan (Chinese: 涂山; pinyin: Túshān) is a town under the administration of Nan'an District, Chongqing, China. As of 2023, it administers Lianhua Village (莲花村) and the following ten residential communities.

- Shixilu Community (石溪路社区)
- Youyuli Community (友于里社区)
- Renjilu Community (仁济路社区)
- Luozibao Community (骡子堡社区)
- Hongxing Community (红星社区)
- Tenglong Community (腾龙社区)
- Fumin Community (福民社区)
- Huangjingpo Community (黄荆坡社区)
- Xinglongwan Community (兴隆湾社区)
- Xinxing Community (新兴社区)

== See also ==
- List of township-level divisions of Chongqing
