= Jiang Chongjing =

Chinese politician and academic administrator (1916–2019)

Jiang Chongjing (Chinese: 蒋崇璟; April 1916 – 27 June 2019) was a Chinese politician and academic administrator. He served as president of the Northwestern Polytechnical University and Chongqing University of Technology, Party Secretary of the University of Electronic Science and Technology of China, and Vice Minister of the Fourth Ministry of Machine Building.

== Biography ==
Jiang was born in Gaoyang County, Hebei, Republic of China in April 1916.

After the outbreak of the Second Sino-Japanese War, he abandoned his university studies to join the Communist resistance in April 1938. He joined the Chinese Communist Party in August 1938 and served as an officer in the Eighth Route Army. During the war he served as Director of the Political Department of the 29th Regiment and then Political Commissar of the 27th Regiment. During the Chinese Civil War, he was in charge of weapons production in the Shaanxi-Gansu-Ningxia revolutionary base area.

After the founding of the People's Republic of China in 1949, Jiang served as president of the Northwestern Polytechnical University and Chongqing University of Technology. He later served as Party Secretary of the University of Electronic Science and Technology of China.

In June 1978, Jiang was appointed Vice Minister of the Fourth Ministry of Machine Building. He retired in December 1982.

Jiang died in Beijing on 27 June 2019, at the age of 103.
