= Southwest University of Political Science and Law =

University in Chongqing, China

Coordinates: 29°39′51″N 106°35′34″E

- 西南政法大学
- Motto: 博学、笃行、厚德、重法
- Type: Public university
- Established: 1950; 76 years ago
- President: Lin Wei (林维)
- Students: 23,750
- Location: Chongqing, China
- Campus: Yubei District and Shapingba District
- Website: swupl.edu.cn

Southwest University of Political Science and Law
- Simplified Chinese: 西南政法大学
- Traditional Chinese: 西南政法大學
Transcriptions
Standard Mandarin
- Hanyu Pinyin: xīnán zhèngfǎ dàxué

The Southwest University of Political Science and Law (SWUPL) is a municipal public university in Yubei, Chongqing, China. It is affiliated with the City of Chongqing, and co-funded by the Chongqing Municipal People's Government and the Ministry of Education.

The university was founded in 1953 as Southwest College of Political Science and Law.

== History ==
Southwest University of Political Science and Law (SWUPL) developed from the Department of Political Science and Law at Southwest University of People's Revolution which was founded in 1950, with Marshal Liu Bocheng as the university president.

In 1953, SWUPL was officially established through merging the Political Science and Law departments of Chongqing University and Sichuan University, the Law departments of Chongqing Finance and Economy College, and of Guizhou University and Yunnan University.

In 2000, the administration of the university was transferred from the Ministry of Justice to the Chongqing municipality, thus creating a system of co-administration between the central and local government.

In 2003, it was approved as one of the first universities to grant doctoral degree of first-level legal discipline. In 2004, it established one post-doctorate mobile station of Law. In 2007, SWUPL was awarded as "excellent undergraduate education" by Ministry of Education.

In 2008, SWUPL became a university co-administrated by Ministry of Education and Chongqing Municipality.

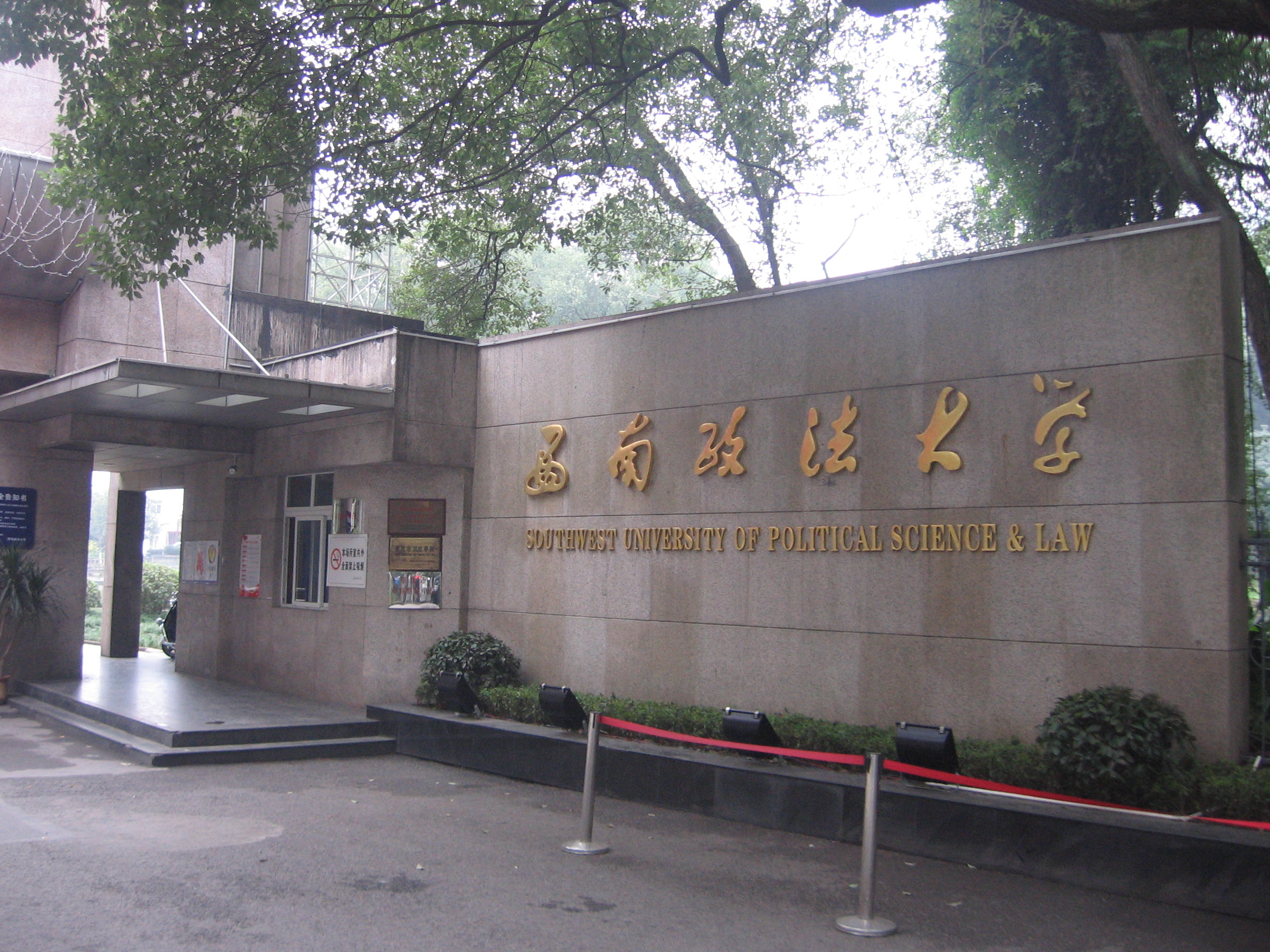
Main entrance

SWUPL became the first University in Chongqing co-administered by the Ministry and Municipality on October 24, 2012.

The university has three campuses, the main in Yubei, the other two in Shapingba and Baoshenghu, covering a total area of 209 hectares (520 acres). There are 14 schools, including School of Civil and Commercial law, School of Economic Law, Law School, School of Administrative Law, School of International Law, School of Criminal investigation, School of Marxism, School of Juris Master, School of Management, School of Politics and Public Administration, School of Journalism and Communication, School of Foreign Languages, School of Applied Law, and School of Economics.

It offers 20 bachelor's programs, 37 master's programs of sub-disciplines, 4 professional master's programs and 10 doctoral programs of sub-discipline, and 2 national key disciplines. The university has postdoctoral center for legal research and 6 provincial key bases for humanity and social science research. It has 1421 faculty and staff members, among which 1157 are full-time. It has 5159 postgraduates and 18591 undergraduates. The university's library has over 4,200,000 books.

== Location ==
The university consists of Shapingba, Yubei and Baoshenghu Campuses in Chongqing municipality.

== See also ==
- List of universities and colleges in Chongqing
- List of universities in China
