= President Chiang =

President Chiang may refer to:

- Chiang Kai-shek (1887–1975), 1st president of the Republic of China
- Chiang Ching-kuo (1910–1988), 3rd president of the Republic of China and son of the 1st president
