= Chongqing Jiaotong University =

Municipal public university in Chongqing, China

Coordinates: 29.4928°N 106.5681°E

- 重庆交通大学
- Motto: 空谈误国，实干兴邦，明德笃学，求实创新
- Type: Public university
- Established: 1951
- President: Tang Boming
- Students: 24,000
- Location: Chongqing, China
- Campus: Suburban
- Website: cqjtu.edu.cn

Chongqing Jiaotong University (CQJTU) is a municipal public university in Nan'an, Chongqing, China. It is affiliated with the City of Chongqing.

== Programs ==
Chongqing Jiaotong University is authorized to confer three Ph.D. degree programs, 27 master's degree programs and 42 bachelor degree majors. It is qualified to confer master's degrees to personnel of the same academic background and authority to confer engineering master's degrees in five fields.

The total enrollment of full-time students is over 16,000.

== Staff ==
The university has a staff of 1,700 including 1,000 academic faculty members.

In addition, the university has 120 talents including top-level candidates of the "thousands and hundreds talents project" of the Ministry of Communications (MOC), scientific and technical talents of the MOC, top-class academic and technological leaders of the Chongqing Municipality and provincial-ministerial-level specialists and experts, all entitled to governmental special allowances of the State Council.

The university has engaged over 140 part-time professors including academics of the China Academy, the China Academy of Engineering, foreign academics, experts and scholars both home and abroad.

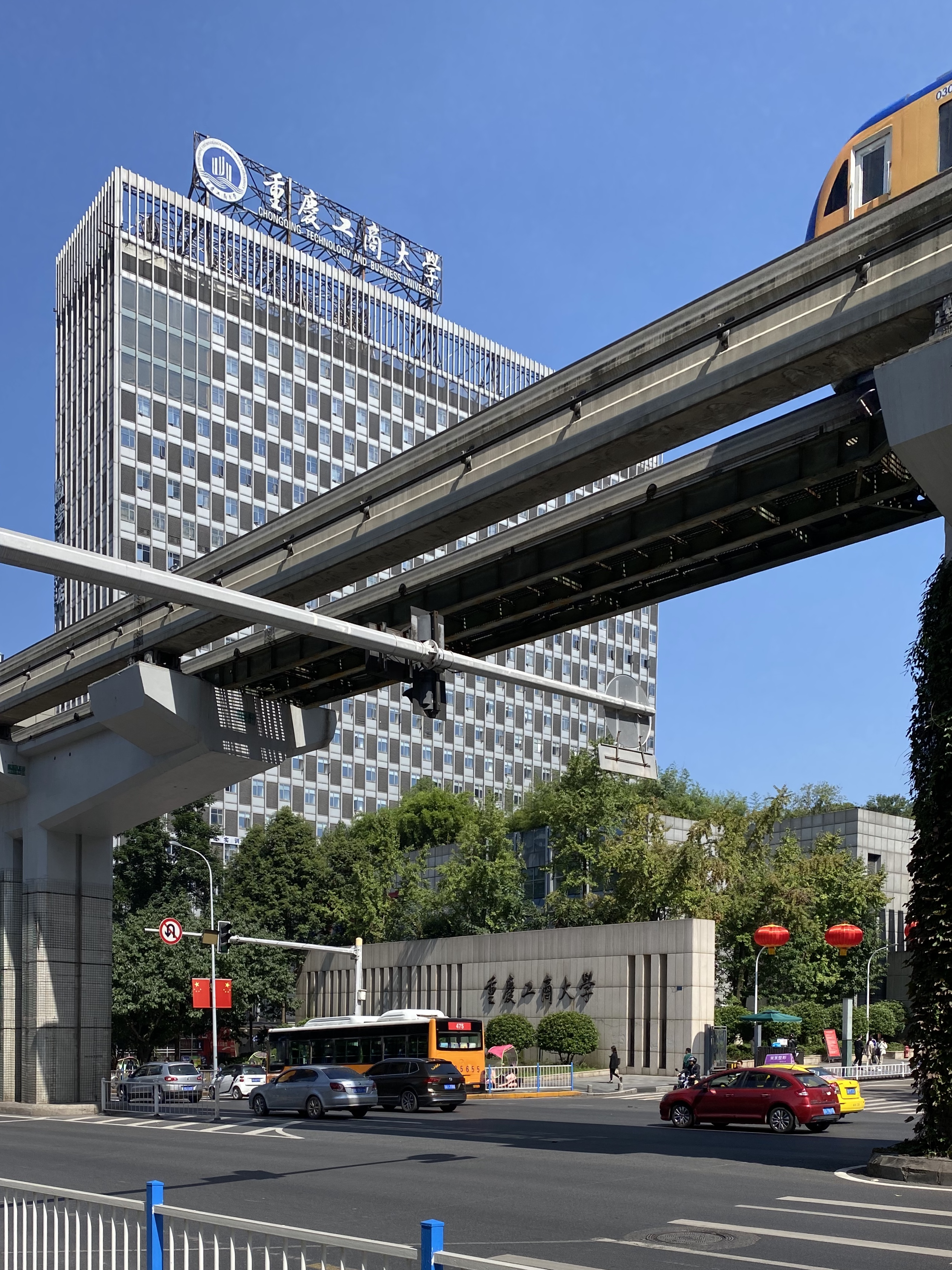
West Gate Chongqing Technology and Business University

== Teaching ==
In 2001, the university underwent a teaching level evaluation of normal college undergraduates given by the Ministry of Education and the evaluation result was "Fine". The graduate supply of the university falls short of demands and initial employment rate of normal college graduates has exceeded 90% for eight consecutive years. Over 50 years of operation, the university has cultivated over 40,000 graduates for the State including Zhemg Jielian, academic of the China Academy of Engineering, and Liu Xiaofeng, vice governor of Sichuan Province.

== Research ==
In the last five years the university has undertaken 40 scientific research programs of State grade, 250 scientific and research programs of provincial and ministerial grades and has published 100 academic works and 4,000 academic papers.

The university has obtained 20 patents for inventions.

It has issued three public academic journals among which Applied Mathematics and Mechanism (whose chief editor Qian Weichang is an academic of the China Academy of Science) is mainly operated by the university and included in SCI and EI. The journal is published in Chinese and English versions to more than 50 states and districts all over the world. The Journal of Chongqing Jiaotong University (natural science edition) is a scientific and technological journal associated with the university.

== Library ==
The university library has 1.4 million books and a broadband Internet network that covers the entire campus.

== Campuses ==
=== Nan'an Campus ===
Located at No. 66 Xuefu Avenue, Nan'an District, Chongqing, the Nan'an Campus serves as the main campus of Chongqing Jiaotong University. It houses the university's administrative center and major research facilities. This campus primarily accommodates third- and fourth-year undergraduate students as well as postgraduate students. Academic and research buildings include the Mingde Building, Teaching Buildings No. 1–4, and the Language Laboratory Building. Student housing is provided in residential areas such as Huiyuan and Zhiyuan.

=== Science City Campus ===
The Science City Campus is located in Shuangfu New District, Jiangjin District, Chongqing. It was largely completed in 2011 and began hosting first-year students that same year. The campus is primarily responsible for the education of first- and second-year undergraduate students. Situated in a gently rolling area, the campus features Lizi Lake, which spans approximately 115 mu (7.7 ha or 19 acres). Plans include 2,500 mu (170 ha or 420 acres) of land for academic and research use, with a total building area of 850,000 m^{2} (85 ha). Additionally, 400 to 500 mu (27 to 33 ha or 67 to 82 acres) is designated for the development of residential facilities for faculty and staff. Facilities currently in operation include the First Teaching Building, the Experimental Center, the Science City Campus Library, Deyuan Residential Area, Deyuan Service Center, and the Student Activity Center.

== Awards ==
Since 2000, after receiving State invention award in 1996 and the second and the third prizes of the State scientific and technological progress in 1998, the university has received another three State prizes: the State first prize and the second prize for scientific and technological progress, the State second prize for teaching fruit.

== International collaboration ==
Chongqing Jiaotong University has cooperative relationships with 30 foreign universities and scientific research units including the University of Texas in United States, University of Hannover in Germany, University of St. Petersburg in Russia, University of Burgos in Spain and University of Hanoi in Vietnam. Since 2004, the university has started to enroll overseas students.
