= Chongqing University of Posts and Telecommunications =

Public university in Chongqing, China

Coordinates: 29°31′55″N 106°36′28″E

- 重庆邮电大学
- Former name: 重庆邮电学院
- Motto: 修德 博学 求实 创新
- Type: Public
- Established: 1950; 76 years ago
- Principal: Su Sen
- Faculty: more than 1,700
- Students: nearly 24,000
- Location: Chongqing, China
- Campus: Urban, 3,800 acres (1,500 ha)
- Website: www.cqupt.edu.cn

The Chongqing University of Posts and Telecommunications (重庆邮电大学; CQUPT) is a municipal public university in Nan'an, Chongqing, China. It is affiliated with the Chongqing Municipal People's Government.

== History ==
CQUPT was founded in 1950 along with the foundation of the People's Republic of China and the communist takeover of Chongqing. It was initially founded in the name of Chongqing Institute of Posts and Telecommunications. In 1965, it was entitled to have postgraduate programs as one of the first 10 colleges that had the right to have such programs in the then Sichuan Province. (Chongqing separated from Sichuan province as a Municipality in 1997.)

In 2000, under the university system reform in China, the university became co-governed and co-financed by the Central Government with the Chongqing municipal government. In 2006, CQUPT contracted with the Ministry of Industry and Information Technology of China to become one of the universities supported by the central government ministry and the municipality government.
