= Sichuan International Studies University =

Public university in Chongqing, China

Coordinates: 29°34′11″N 106°26′12″E

- 四川外国语大学
- Motto in English: Global Vision, Academic Excellence
- Type: Public
- Established: May 1950; 76 years ago
- President: Dr. Dong Hongchuan (董洪川)
- Faculty: 1,100
- Undergraduates: 8,000
- Postgraduates: 2,500
- Location: Chongqing, China
- Campus: Suburban
- Website: sisu.edu.cn en.sisu.edu.cn

Sichuan International Studies University (SISU; Chinese: 四川外国语大学) is a public research university in Chongqing, China. It is one of the first four higher education institutions specializing in foreign languages in the country.

SISU is the flagship institution for foreign language education and information consultancy in southwest China. According to the latest Wu Shulian Chinese Universities Rankings, Sichuan International Studies University is ranked No. 4 among peer universities specializing in international studies in China.

It is colloquially known in Chinese as Chuānwài (川外).

== History ==
It was founded as the Russian Training School of Southwest Military University of People's Liberation Army (PLA) in May 1950. It is the only university specialized in foreign language studies in the southwest region of China. Due to its close relationship with the Chinese Ministry of Foreign Affairs, it is one of the ministry's few target schools.

The development of SISU has been highlighted with 6 important dates:

- April 1950 - founding of the "PLA's Russian Training Corps of Southwest University of Military and Political Sciences" with the support of Deng Xiaoping, Liu Bocheng, He Hong and other founding fathers of the People's Republic of China.
- January 1951 - renamed as the "Russian Training Brigade of No.2 Senior Infantry School of the PLA."
- November 1952 - renamed as the "Russian Department of Southwest People's Revolutionary University."
- March 1953 - renamed as "Southwest Russian College."
- May 1959 - renamed as "Sichuan Institute of Foreign Languages".
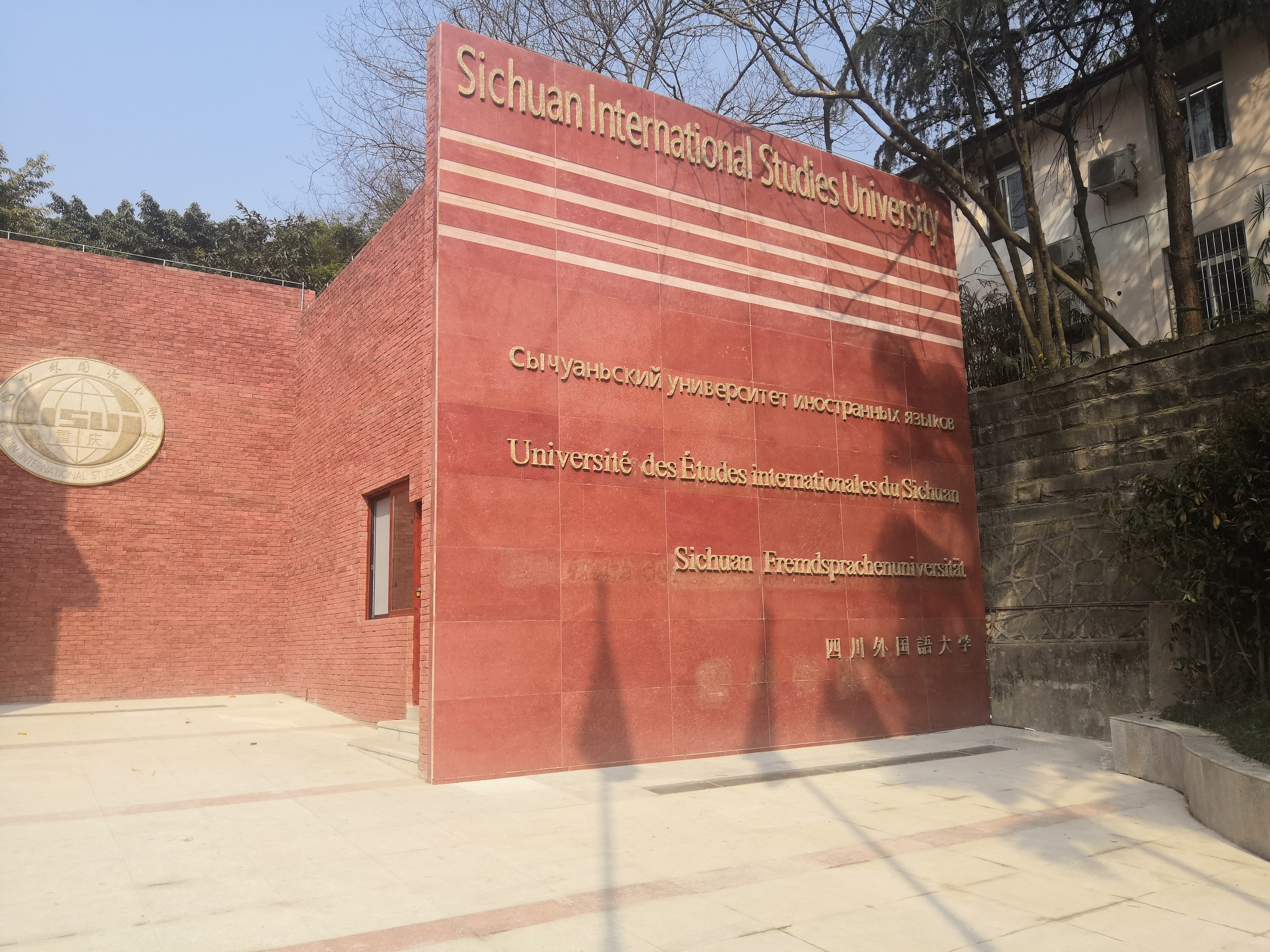
- The gate of Sichuan International Studies University
  May 1990 - renamed as "Sichuan International Studies University".

== Faculty and Student ==
The majority of domestic students took liberal arts only curriculums in high school. Out of 12,000 registered students, 8,000 enrolled in four-year and three-year undergraduate programs; 2,500 are in adult and continuing education programs; while the rest are in short-term training programs.

Sichuan International Studies University currently employs 1,366 staff members, including 929 full-time faculty. Among the faculty, 49.33% hold senior professional titles, and 48.22% hold doctoral degrees. The university has 184 recognitions of high-level talent, including recipients of the State Council Special Allowance, National Outstanding Educators, National Model Teachers, members of the Ministry of Education’s Foreign Language Teaching Advisory Board, provincial and ministerial-level experts with outstanding contributions, academic leaders and reserve candidates, Chongqing Talents Program scholars, Bayu Scholars, and Chongqing Model Educators.

== Programmes ==
Foreign language programmes offered include Russian, English, Spanish, French, Italian, German, Korean, Japanese, Hungarian, Polish, Ukrainian, Portuguese, Romanian, Czech, Hebrew, Thai, Vietnamese, Malay, Burmese, Persian, Turkish, Hindi and Arabic.

Non-language specialties have been added to its curriculum, such as law, finance, pedagogy, journalism, sociology, advertising, international politics, and international Chinese language education.

Several master's degree programs have been offered, for example, Russian Language and Literature, English Language and Literature, French Language and Literature, German Language and Literature, Japanese Language and Literature, Comparative Literature and World Literature, etc. Doctor's degree programs have been offered.

== Campus ==
SISU main campus is in Shapingba, Chongqing, at the foothill of the Mount Gele and by the Jialing River, with an area of 770,000 square meters. The award-winning campus has been recognized as a "Garden Institution" by the Chongqing Municipal government for its green spaces.

Sichuan International Studies University currently operates over 110 teaching laboratories and has established three municipal-level experimental teaching demonstration centers in Chongqing: the Foreign Language Laboratory Center, the Integrated Communication Skills Lab Center, and the Center for Diplomatic and International Affairs Simulation.

Sichuan International Studies University Library holds a collection of approximately 1.3 million printed volumes in 22 languages. Its digital resources include 1.85 million e-books, 64,460 e-journal titles totaling over 1 million volumes, and access to 99 academic databases.

== Main academic departments ==
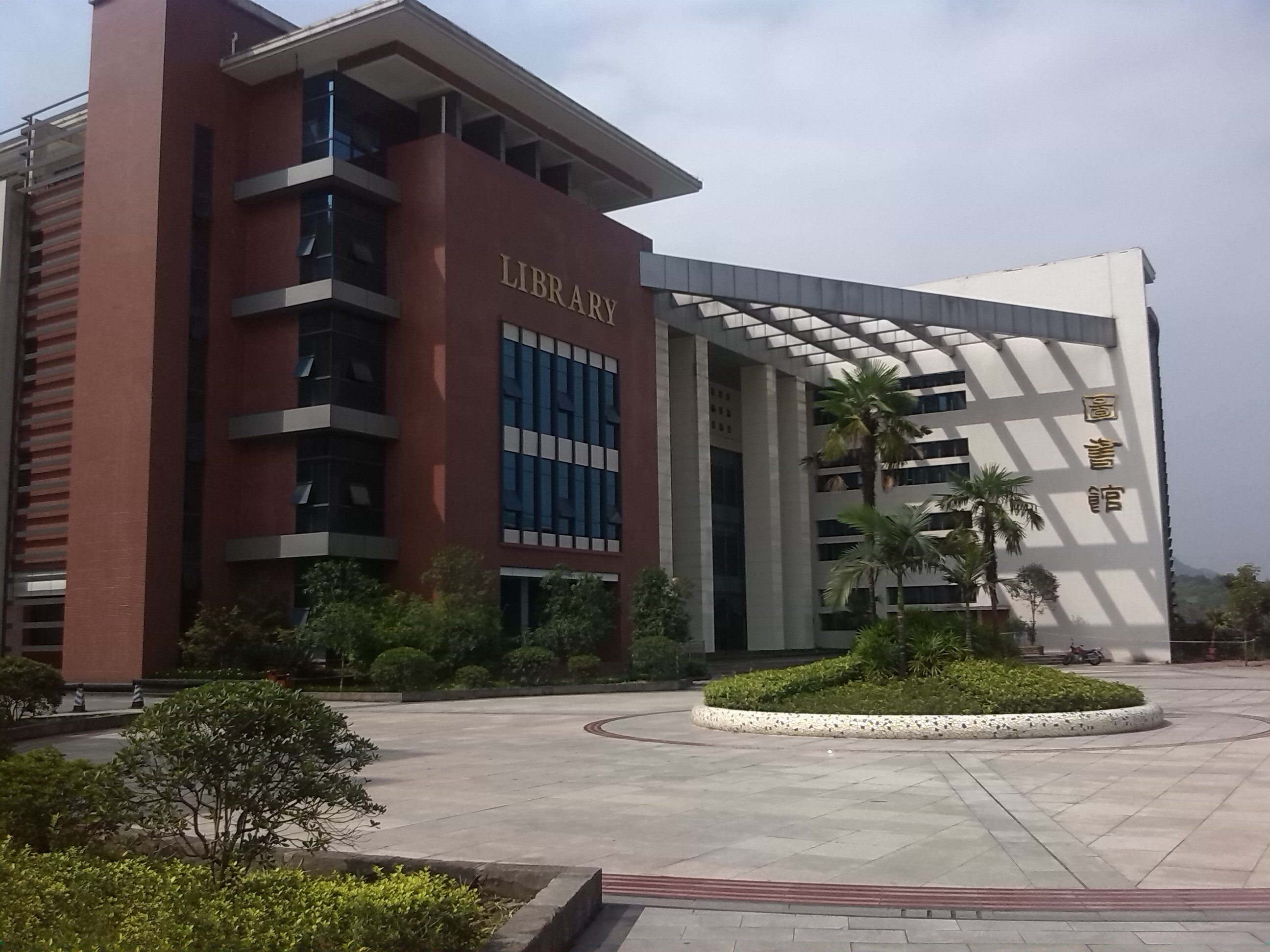
Library of the Sichuan International Studies University

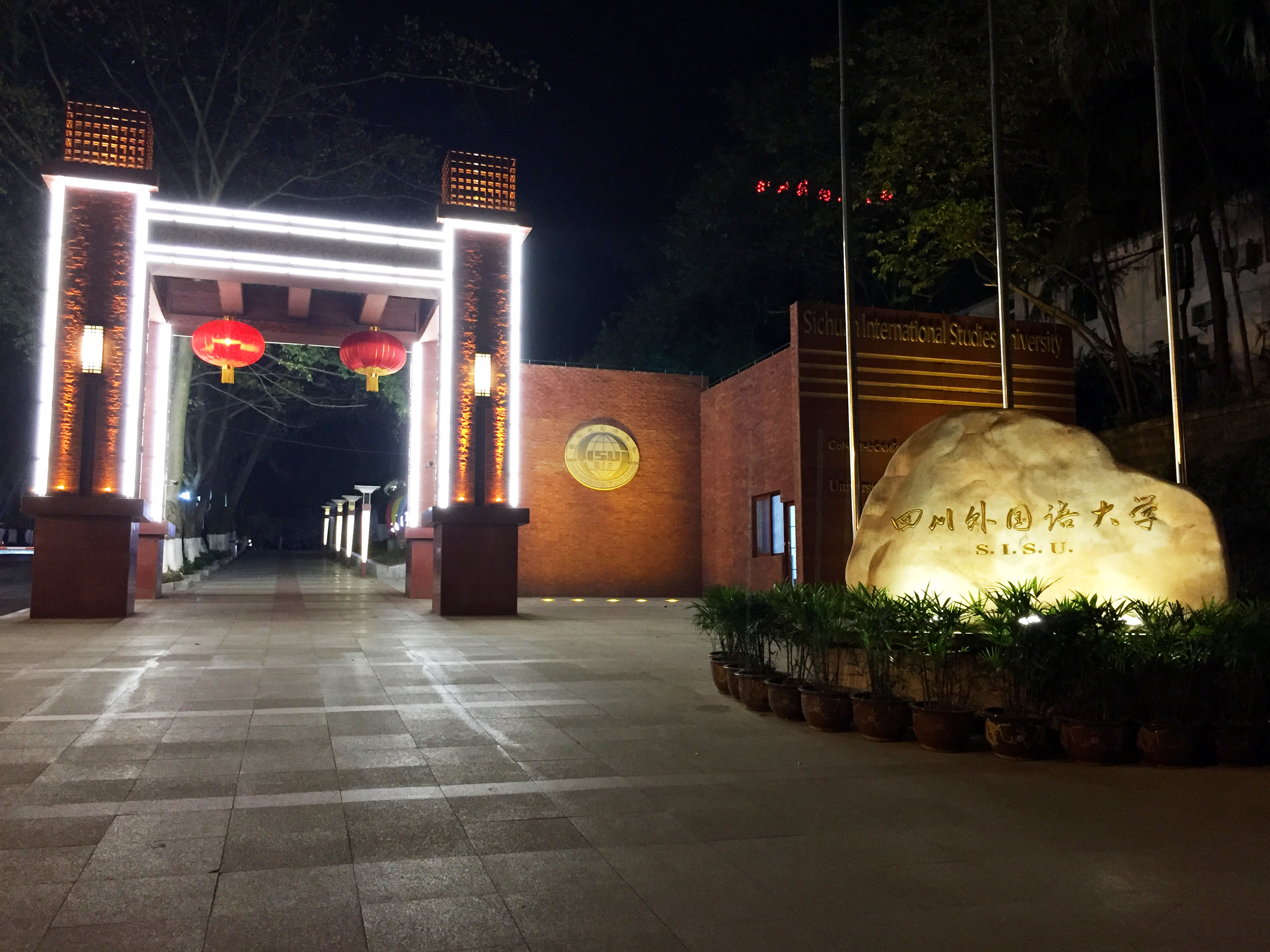
Main Entrance

- School of English Studies
- College of Translation and Interpreting
- School of Business English
- College of French Studies
- College of German Studies
- College of Japanese Studies
- College of Russian Studies
- College of Western Languages and Cultures (Chongqing College of Multi-languages)
- College of Eastern Languages and Cultures (Chongqing College of Multi-languages)
- School of Marxism
- School of International Relations
- College of Chinese Languages and Culture
- School of Journalism and Communication
- School of International Business and Management
- College of Finance and Economics
- College of International Education
- College of International Law and Sociology
- College of Language Intelligence (College of General Education)
- Department of Physical Education
- School of International Studies
- MOE Training Centre for Overseas Study
- College of Online and Continuing Education

== International cooperation ==
The university has established intercollegiate cooperation and exchange relationships with more than 140 universities and institutions across over 30 countries and regions. It runs two joint education programs approved by the Ministry of Education—namely, the Sino-Australian Business English Program and the Sino-French Logistics Management Program. Sichuan International Studies University co-founded three Confucius Institutes with N. A. Dobrolyubova State Linguistic University of Nizhny Novgorod in Russia, University of Lomé in Togo, and the East Central Ohio Educational Service Center in the United States, as well as a Confucius Classroom at the Siyuan Academia de Lengua China in Ecuador.

In recent years, the university has actively engaged in joint talent training at the undergraduate, master's, and doctoral levels, faculty development programs, research collaboration, and international talent recruitment. On average, it enrolls over 400 international students annually and hosts more than 70 long- and short-term foreign experts and teachers. Each year, the university sends out more than 100 faculty members and over 600 students abroad for exchange and teaching programs.
