= Huangjuewan interchange =

Interchange in Chongqing, China

- 黄桷湾立交
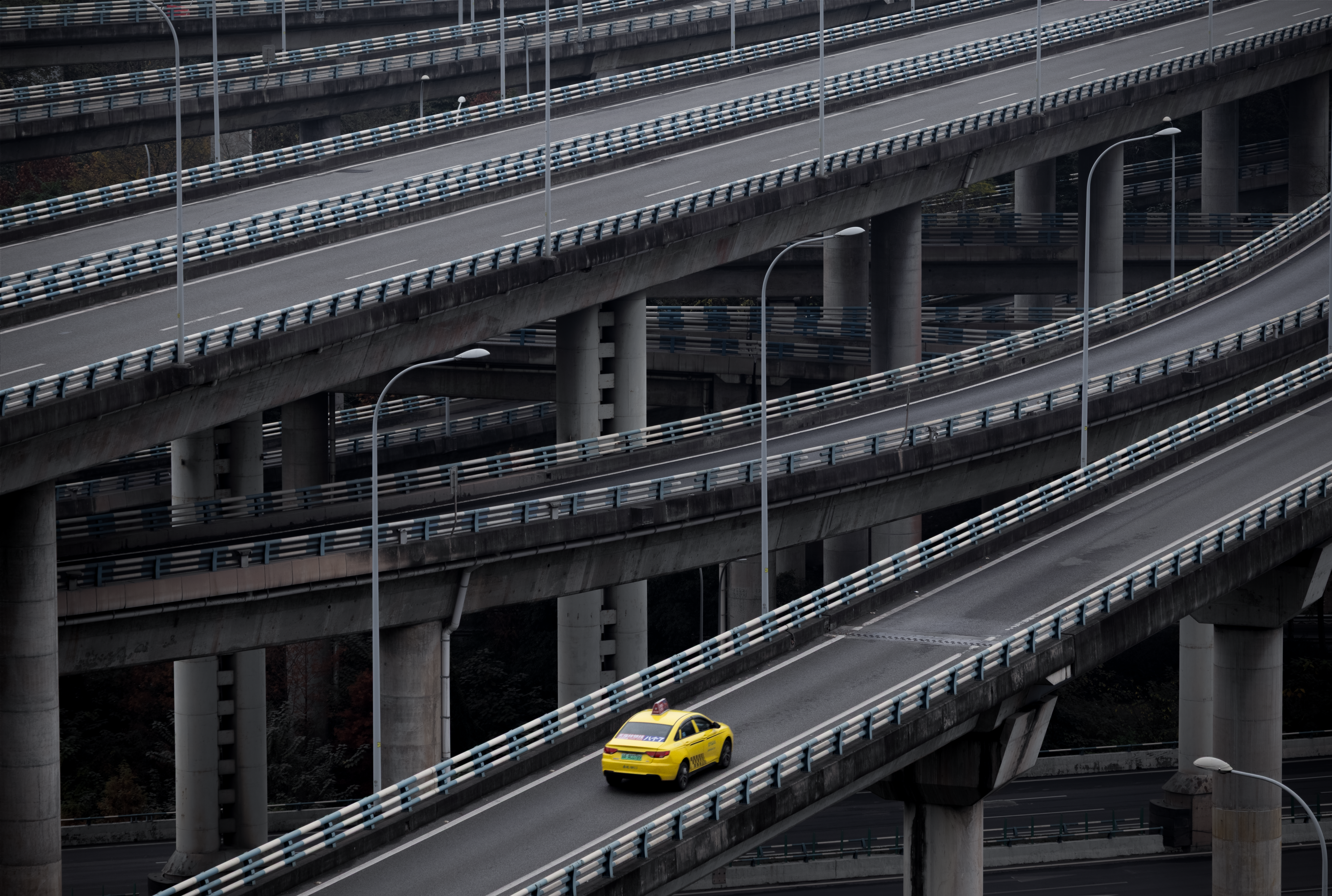
- Interactive map of Huangjuewan interchange

Location
- Chongqing, China
- Coordinates: 29.5876570°N 106.6011721°E
- Roads at junction: G65 Baotou–Maoming Expressway; G50S; Yuhang Avenue

Construction
- Type: Stack Interchange
- Constructed: 2009
- Opened: 1 June 2017
- Maximum height: 37 m (121 ft)

The Huangjuewan interchange is a 5 level interchange in Chongqing, China. It is located in Nan'an district, on the right bank of the Yangtze River, east of the city center.

The interchange consists of 2 intersecting expressways and another expressway with divided lanes. It is also connected to undivided municipal roads. The expressways from 5 directions are the G65 expressway in the north-south direction, the expressway connecting Wuhong Rd. with Xiajiang Rd. in the west-east direction and the G50S (Yuhang Blvd.) from the Northnortheast. The municipal roads from 4 directions are the X750 (Danguang Rd.) from Southsouthwest to Northnortheast, Tenghuang Rd. to the North and the YA12 road to the Southeast.

The 5 expressways are connected by 14 ramps, so it is possible to drive from any direction to any other direction, except from G65 North to Yuhang Blvd. and vice versa. Danguang Rd. and its intersection with Tenghuang Rd. and YA12 is connected to G65 with 4 ramps, so that it is possible to drive on/off to/from both directions – but it is not possible to switch to the other expressways. The number of directions and the number of ramps is wrong in most sources, but in online maps and in Google Earth the numbers are easily recognizable.

Construction started in September 2009 and was completed in 2017.
