= Shapingba, Chongqing =

Shapingba 沙坪坝区
- District
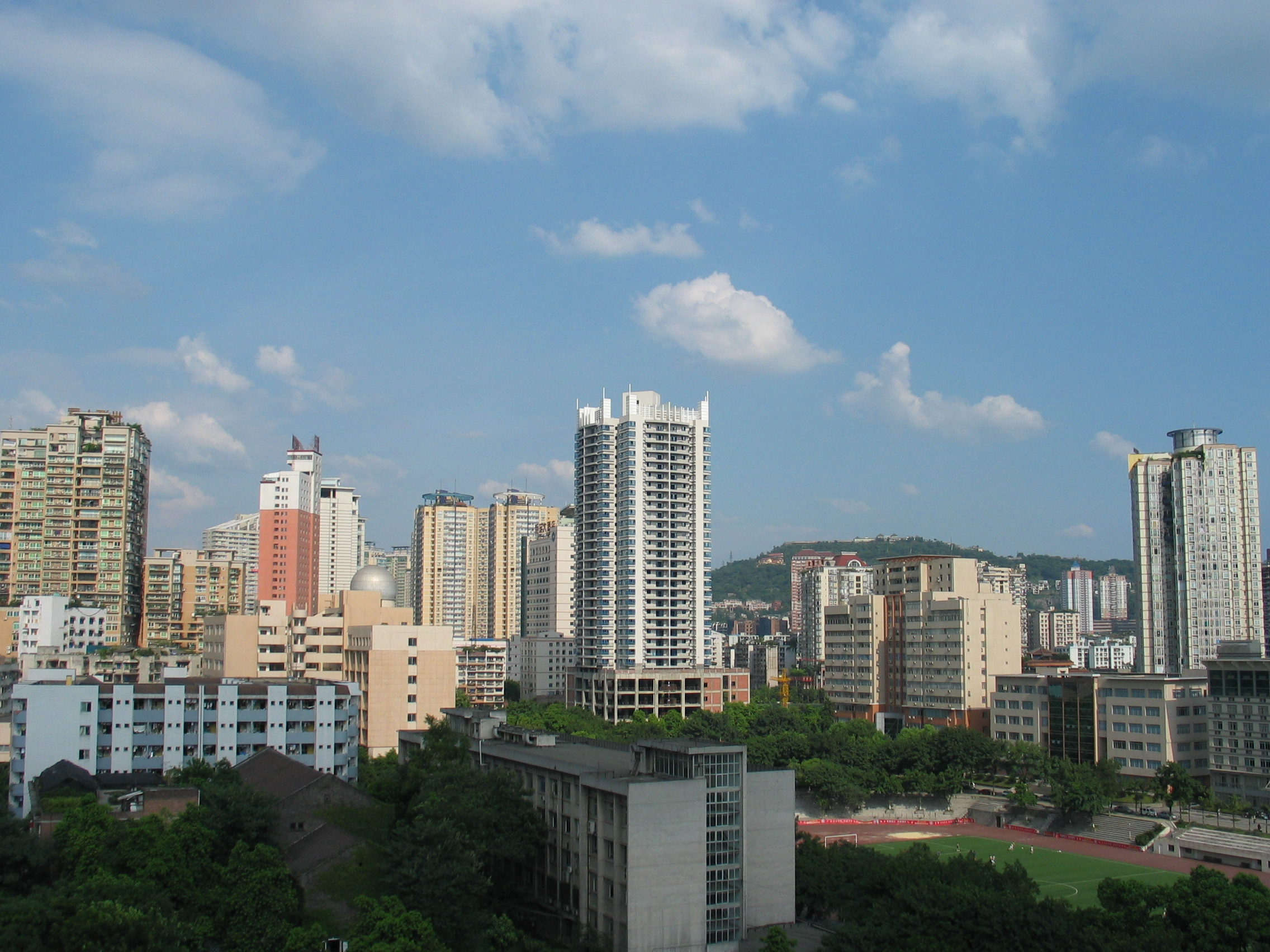
- The skyline of Shapingba.

- Shapingba District in Chongqing
- Country: People's Republic of China
- Municipality: Chongqing
- Time zone: UTC+8 (China Standard)
- Postal code: 400030
- Website: http://spb.cq.cqedu.net/

Shapingba (Chinese: 沙坪坝; pinyin: Shāpíngbà) is a district of Chongqing, People's Republic of China, formerly known as Shaci District (沙磁区; Shācí qū) during the Sino-Japanese War. It is one of the central parts of Chongqing and covers around 396 square kilometers, with 13 subdistricts and 11 towns. Shapingba is one of the most populated areas in Chongqing with a population of around one million.

== Location and geography ==
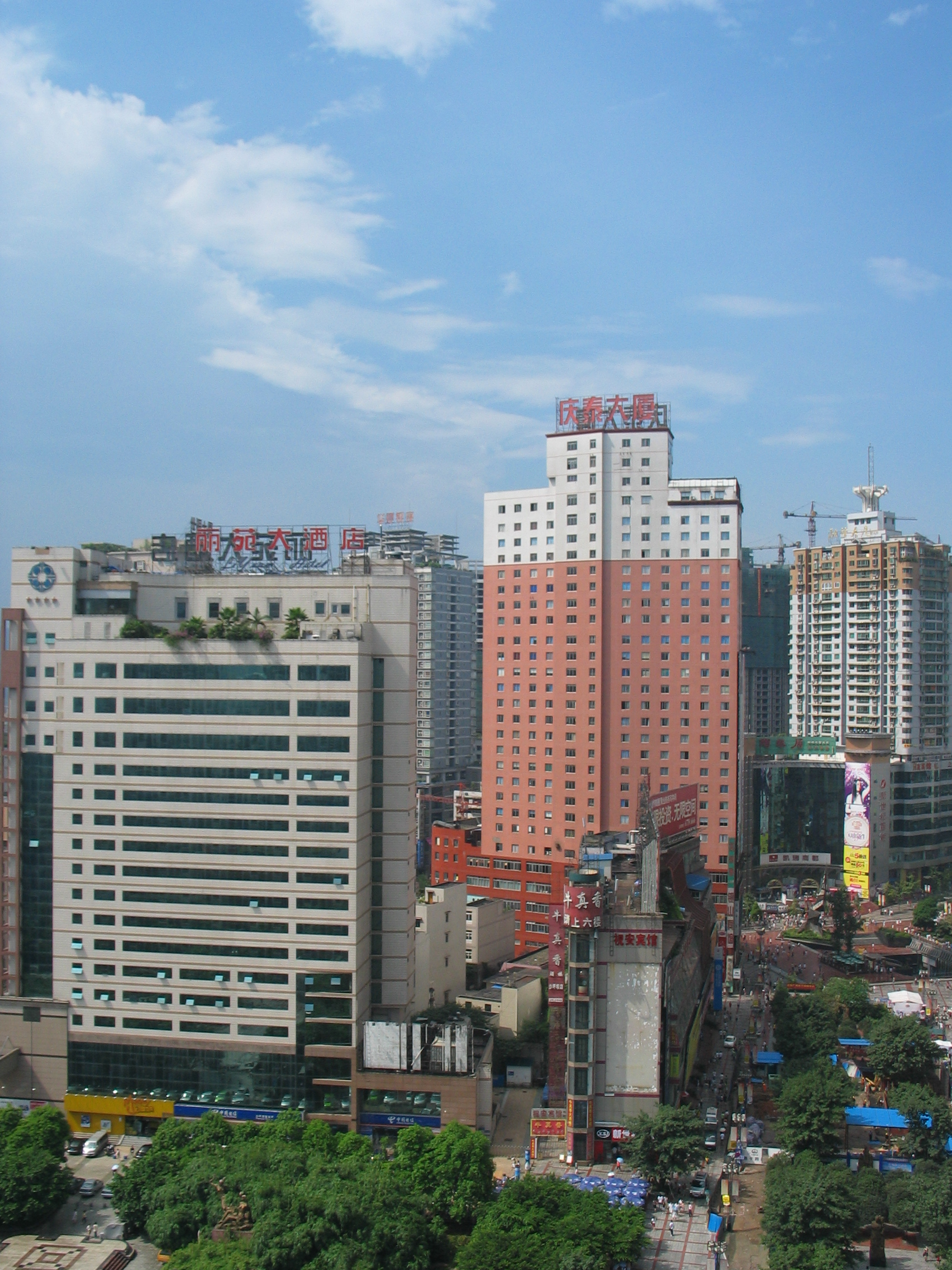
Sanxia Square

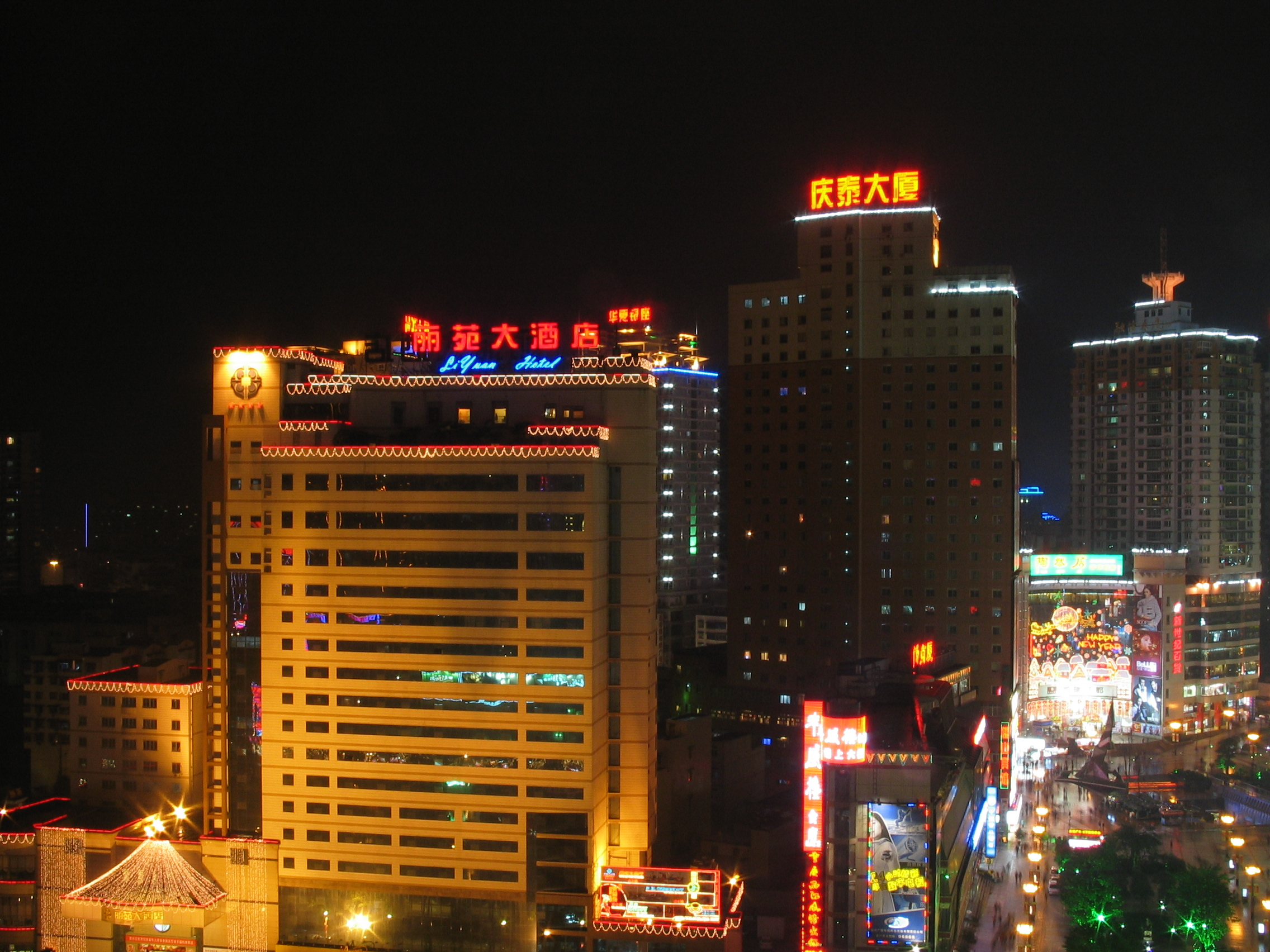
Night view of Sanxia Square

Shapingba is one of Chongqing's main districts. It borders Jiulongpo to the south, Bishan to the west and Beibei to the north. The district itself is on the west bank of the Jialing River.

== History ==
Before Shapingba District became a part of Chongqing, it was part of Baxian (now Banan District). In the early 1930s, Shapingba District belonged to Baxian First District, and the government was located at Ciqikou (Longyin Town), in the ancient section of town. During the Second Sino-Japanese War, the Nationalist government moved its capital to Chongqing, and a large number of schools, factories and medical institutions settled in Shapingba. On February 6, 1938, the Chongqing University, the Sichuan College of Education, the Chongqing Nankai Middle School, the Chongqing Electrical Steel Works and several institutions relocated to Shapingba from Beijing, Shanghai or Nanjing such as the National Central University, China Radio International, and the Academia Sinica.

== Administrative divisions ==
Name	Chinese (S)	Hanyu Pinyin	Population (2010)	Area (km^{2})
Xiaolongkan Subdistrict	小龙坎街道	Xiǎolóngkǎn Jiēdào	35,167	0.97
Shapingba Subdistrict	沙坪坝街道	Shāpíngbà Jiēdào	73,290	2.68
Yubei Road Subdistrict	渝碚路街道	Yúbèilù Jiēdào	100,012	2.3
Ciqikou Subdistrict	磁器口街道	Cíqìkǒu Jiēdào	18,963	1.2
Tongjiaqiao Subdistrict	童家桥街道	Tóngjiāqiáo Jiēdào	47,873	2.92
Shijingpo Subdistrict	石井坡街道	Shíjǐngpō Jiēdào	33,184	3.15
Zhanjiaxi Subdistrict	詹家溪街道	Zhānjiāxī Jiēdào	31,683	
Jingkou Subdistrict	井口街道	Jǐngkǒu Jiēdào	25,679	
Geyaoshan Subdistrict	歌乐山街道	Gēyàoshān Jiēdào	10,950	4
Shandong Subdistrict	山洞街道	Shāndòng Jiēdào	3,075	1.45
Xinqiao Subdistrict	新桥街道	Zīnqiáo Jiēdào	52,762	
Tianxingqiao Subdistrict	天星桥街道	Tiānxīngqiáo Jiēdào	77,470	5.2
Tuwan Subdistrict	土湾街道	Tǔwān Jiēdào	45,144	1.3
Tanjiagang Subdistrict	覃家岗街道	Tánjiāgǎng Jiēdào	79,544	31
Chenjiaqiao Subdistrict	陈家桥街道	Chénjiāqiáo Jiēdào	54,828	38.42
Huxi Subdistrict	虎溪街道	Hǔxī Jiēdào	54,079	27
Xiyong Subdistrict	西永街道	Xīyǒng Jiēdào	26,140	28.6
Lianfang Subdistrict	联芳街道	Liánfāng Jiēdào	24,778	
Jingkou town	井口镇	Jǐngkǒu Zhèn	27,404	25
Geyaoshan town	歌乐山镇	Gēyàoshān Zhèn	41,674	36.6
Qingmuguan town	青木关镇	Qīngmùguān Zhèn	30,469	32.27
Fenghuang town	凤凰镇	Fènghuáng Zhèn	19,902	31.7
Huilongba town	回龙坝镇	Huílóngbà Zhèn	26,582	39.1
Zengjia town	曾家镇	Zēngjiā Zhèn	23,947	34.03
Tuzhu town	土主镇	Tǔzhǔ Zhèn	18,303	33.32
Zhongliang town	中梁镇	Zhōngliáng Zhèn	17,111	

=== Colleges and universities ===
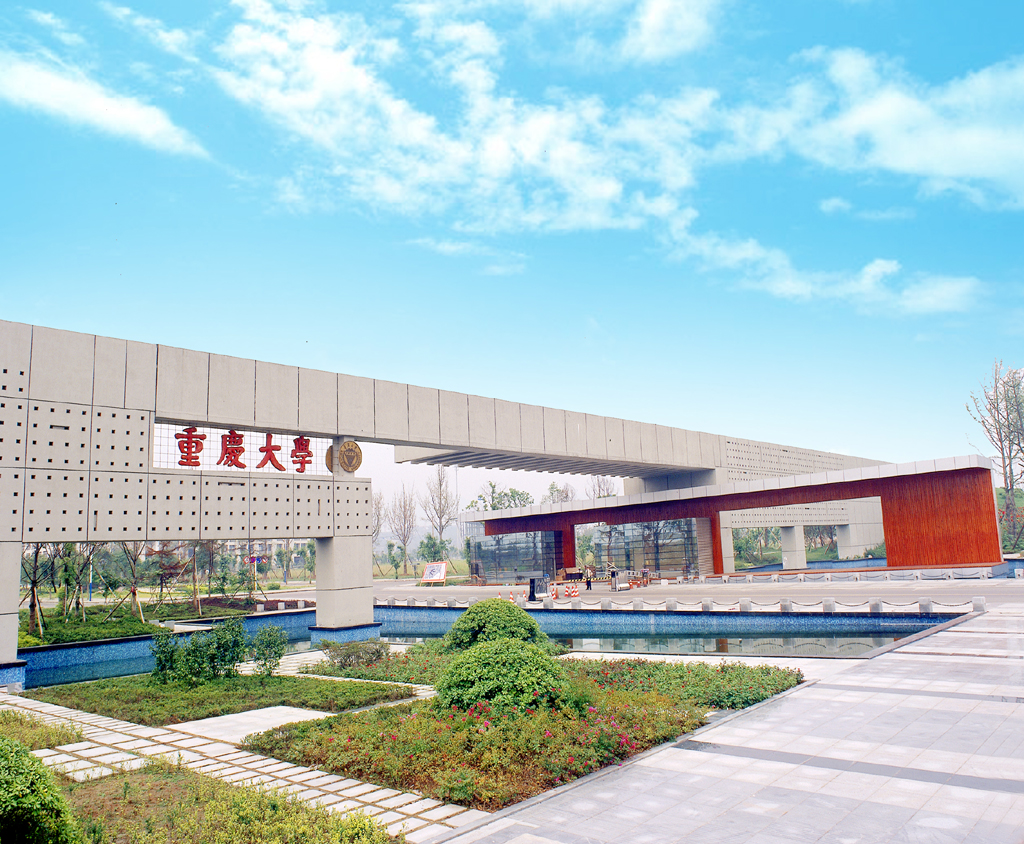
Chongqing University

- Chongqing University (重庆大学) (founded in 1929)
- Chongqing University of Science and Technology (重庆科技学院)
- Army Medical University (陆军军医大学)
- Chongqing Normal University (重庆师范大学)
- Southwest University of Political Science and Law (西南政法大学)
- Sichuan International Studies University (四川外国语大学)
- Western Chongqing University (渝西学院)

== Climate ==
Climate data for Chongqing (Shapingba District, 1991–2020 normals)
Month	Jan	Feb	Mar	Apr	May	Jun	Jul	Aug	Sep	Oct	Nov	Dec	Year
Record high °C (°F)	18.8 (65.8)	24.6 (76.3)	34.3 (93.7)	36.5 (97.7)	38.9 (102.0)	39.8 (103.6)	42.0 (107.6)	43.7 (110.7)	42.0 (107.6)	37.4 (99.3)	29.6 (85.3)	21.5 (70.7)	43.7 (110.7)
Mean daily maximum °C (°F)	10.4 (50.7)	13.6 (56.5)	18.6 (65.5)	23.9 (75.0)	27.4 (81.3)	29.8 (85.6)	33.7 (92.7)	33.9 (93.0)	28.5 (83.3)	22.0 (71.6)	17.3 (63.1)	11.7 (53.1)	22.6 (72.6)
Daily mean °C (°F)	8.1 (46.6)	10.4 (50.7)	14.5 (58.1)	19.2 (66.6)	22.6 (72.7)	25.4 (77.7)	28.9 (84.0)	28.9 (84.0)	24.4 (75.9)	18.9 (66.0)	14.5 (58.1)	9.5 (49.1)	18.8 (65.8)
Mean daily minimum °C (°F)	6.4 (43.5)	8.3 (46.9)	11.7 (53.1)	16.0 (60.8)	19.4 (66.9)	22.4 (72.3)	25.4 (77.7)	25.3 (77.5)	21.5 (70.7)	16.8 (62.2)	12.5 (54.5)	8.0 (46.4)	16.1 (61.0)
Record low °C (°F)	−1.8 (28.8)	−0.8 (30.6)	1.2 (34.2)	2.8 (37.0)	10.8 (51.4)	15.5 (59.9)	19.2 (66.6)	17.8 (64.0)	14.3 (57.7)	6.9 (44.4)	0.7 (33.3)	−1.7 (28.9)	−1.8 (28.8)
Average precipitation mm (inches)	20.7 (0.81)	22.4 (0.88)	55.6 (2.19)	103.4 (4.07)	142.5 (5.61)	212.1 (8.35)	174.2 (6.86)	125.7 (4.95)	124.7 (4.91)	95.3 (3.75)	50.4 (1.98)	24.7 (0.97)	1,151.7 (45.33)
Average precipitation days (≥ 0.1 mm)	10.0	8.9	11.5	13.6	16.0	16.0	11.3	11.5	12.6	15.8	11.3	10.6	149.1
Average relative humidity (%)	82	78	75	75	76	79	73	70	77	84	83	84	78
Mean monthly sunshine hours	16.6	32.9	72.8	105.8	109.7	98.7	169.3	175.2	102.6	46.6	35.0	18.0	983.2
Percentage possible sunshine	5	10	19	27	26	24	40	43	28	13	11	6	21
Average ultraviolet index	4	6	8	10	11	12	12	11	10	7	5	4	8
Source 1: China Meteorological Administration
Source 2: Weather Atlas (uv)

== Transport ==
Transport connections to and from Shapingba has improved over the years. There are buses that run directly to most other districts including Jiangbei, Yuzhong and Jiulongpo. Three highways, Chengdu-Chongqing, Chongqing-Changshou and Shangqiao-Jieshi come across here. Within only half an hour, it is possible to reach the Chongqing Jiangbei International Airport. Chongqing's West Railway Station is located in Shapingba. Though departures and arrivals are somewhat limited at this station, it is quite useful for trips to nearby destations such as Guiyang or Dazhou.

- China National Highway 212

=== Metro ===
Shapingba metro station is currently served by three metro lines operated by Chongqing Rail Transit:

- Line 1 - Gaomiaocun, Majiayan, Xiaolongkan, Shapingba, Yanggongqiao, Lieshimu, Ciqikou, Shijingpo, Shuangbei, Laijiaqiao, Weidianyuan, Chenjiaqiao, Daxuecheng, Jiandingpo
- Line 9 - (unfinished editing)
- Loop line - (unfinished editing)
- Line 27 - Construction started in 2022 and will be set to complete in the future

== Industry ==
The industry of Shapingba mainly consists of motorcycle and car manufacture, electrical equipment, biologic-chemical industry and tertiary occupation. The state owned corporations include Jialing Group, Southwest Pharmaceutical Co. Ltd and Chongqing Pesticide Chemical Group, while private owned corporations include Chongqing HuiLi Ltd , Lifan Group, Yuan Group and Huayang Group.

== Tourism ==
Shapingba has a number of tourist attractions, including the monuments of Second Sino-Japanese War and Red Crag. The Geleshan is located in the old town of Ciqikou. Lin's Garden is also an attraction.
