= Chongqing University of Science and Technology =

Public university in Shapingba, Chongqing, China

Coordinates: 29°35′30″N 106°19′33″E

- 重庆科技大学
- Motto: 厚德、博学、励志、笃行
- Type: Public university
- Established: 18 May 1951; 75 years ago
- President: Huachuan Yi
- Faculty: 1,700
- Students: 23,000
- Location: Chongqing, China
- Campus: Urban
- Colors: purplewhite
- Website: cqust.edu.cn

The Chongqing University of Science and Technology (CQUST) is a municipal public university in Shapingba, Chongqing, China. It is affiliated with the Chongqing Municipal People's Government. Originally named as Chongqing Science and Technology College since 2004, the school was conferred university status in November 2023.

As of 2023, the Academic Ranking of World Universities placed the university 7th in the city of Chongqing.

== Partnerships ==
CQUST has established partnerships with multiple overseas universities including University of Illinois at Chicago, University of Regina in Canada, Haaga-Helia University of Applied Sciences in Finland, Hanze Hogeschool Groningen University of Applied Sciences in Holland, Veracruzana University in Mexico, Kyungpook National University in South Korea, Changwon National University in South Korea and National Central University in Taiwan. CQUST has also signed agreements with companies such asChina National Petroleum Corporation, Sinopec, China National Offshore Oil Corporation, Southwest Aluminum Group and Chongqing Iron and Steel Company.
