= Chongqing Technology and Business University =

University in Chongqing, China

Coordinates: 29.5617°N 106.5272°E

- 重庆工商大学
- Former names: Chongqing Institute of Electromechanical Technology; Yuzhou University
- Motto: 厚德博学，求是创新
- Motto in English: Moral, Knowledgeable, Honest and Innovative
- Type: Public university of Chongqing Municipality
- Established: 2002; 24 years ago (with current name); 1978; 48 years ago (as Yuzhou University); 1952; 74 years ago (as Chongqing Institute of Electromechanical Technology)
- President: Jirui Yang
- Academic staff: 2100
- Students: 30000
- Location: Nan'an District, Chongqing, China
- Campus: 1.82 km^{2}
- Colors: Blue and White
- Website: www.ctbu.edu.cn

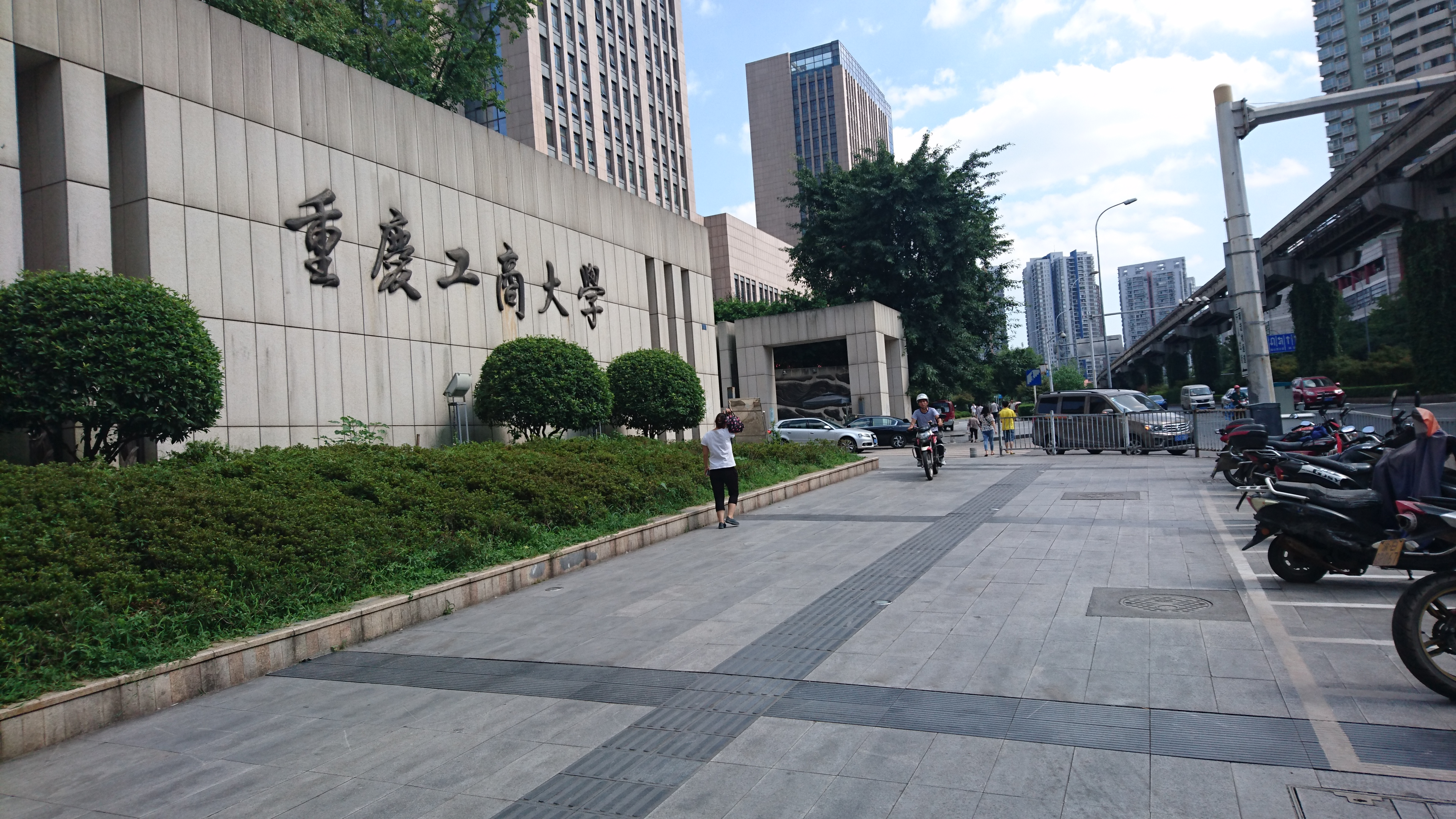
Main Entrance of Chongqing Technology and Business University

Chongqing Technology and Business University (simplified Chinese: 重庆工商大学; traditional Chinese: 重慶工商大學) is a public university in Nan'an District, Chongqing, China. It was formed by the merger of the predecessor Chongqing Business School and Yuzhou University in 2002.

== History ==
The university started with the name of Chongqing Institute of Electromechanical Technology (重庆机电工艺学校) in 1952 as one of the first public universities established by the Chongqing local government. It became Yuzhou University (渝州大学) in 1978.

In 2002, Yuzhou University merged with Chongqing Business College and switched its name to Chongqing Technology and Business University.

== Departments ==
Chongqing Technology and Business University (CTBU) is composed of 22 schools, offering a comprehensive range of academic programs. The university grants a Ph.D. degree in Applied Economics, and provides eight master's degree programs in key disciplines such as Regional Economics, Business Management, Environmental Engineering, Accounting, Statistics, Industrial Economics, Ideological and Political Education, and Media Studies. It also offers 71 undergraduate programs across various fields.

CTBU operates two Sino-foreign cooperative institutions: the International Business School and the Modern International Design and Arts Academy. Additionally, the university includes two financially independent colleges: Pass School and Rongzhi School.

The university currently hosts three municipal-level key disciplines and offers 15 municipal-level key courses, contributing to the academic development of the Chongqing region.

Colleges	Departments	source
College of Economics and Trading	Economics, Trading, International Trading, Economics, and Management	
College of Finance	Finance, Banking, Investment, Insurance	
College of Management	Business Administration, Industrial Administration, Information Sciences, Human Resources, Public Affairs	
Business and Communication School	Marketing, Electronic Business, Logistics Management, Business	
School of Accounting	Accounting, Financial Management	
College of Tourism Development and Land Resources	Tourism Management, Urban and Rural Development, Land Resources Management	
College of Liberal Arts and Journalism	Chinese Literature, Broadcasting and TV, Advertisement, Journalism, Script Writing and Directing	
College of Design and Arts	Environmental Design, Visual Design, Fashion Design, Industrial Design, Photographing, Cartoon Design	
Law School	Law	
College of Maths and Statistics	Statistics, Math, Applied Math	
College of Industrial and Mechanical Engineerings	Mechanical Engineering, packaging engineering, Mechanical and Electrical Engineering, Automobile Service Engineering	
School of Environmental and Biological Engineerings	Chemical Engineering, Material, Environmental Engineering, Biological Engineering, Food Sciences	
School of Computer Sciences and Information Technology	Computer Sciences, Information Technology, Observation and Control Technology, Applied Physics	
School of Foreign Languages	English, French	
School of Physical Education	Physical Education	
School of Public Managements	Social Sciences, Public Managements	
School of Applied Technology	Marketing, Tourism Management, Trade and Economics, Computer Science and Technology	
Modern International Design and Arts Academy	Art and Design (Graphic Design), Art and Design (Advertising Design), Art and Design (Packaging Design)	
School of Film, Television and Animation	Animation Design and Production, Film and Television Animation	
Yangtze River Media School	Broadcast and Television Journalism (Media Management), Journalism (Online Journalism), Advertising (TV Commercials and Marketing)	
School of Architectural Decoration Arts	Art and Design (Landscape and Interior Design), Art and Design (Environmental Art Design)	

== International Cooperation ==
Chongqing Technology and Business University (CTBU) places a strong emphasis on international cooperation and exchange. The university has established partnerships with over 50 universities and institutions across 17 countries and regions.

CTBU collaborates with more than ten internationally renowned universities—including the University of Lincoln (UK), Université Toulouse 1 Capitole (France), and HEC Montréal (Canada)—to offer joint bachelor’s and master’s degree programs.
