= Chongqing University of Technology =

Public university in Chongqing, China

Coordinates: 29°27′09″N 106°31′49″E

- 重庆理工大学
- Former names: 11th Technical School of the Ordnance Department (1940–1950); Chongqing Industrial Institute (1965–1986); Chongqing Institute of Industrial Management (1986–1999); Chongqing Institute of Technology (1999–2009)
- Motto: 明德笃行，自强日新
- Motto in English: Illuminate virtue and act with sincerity; strive for self-improvement and daily renewal
- Type: Public university
- Established: 18 September 1940; 86 years ago
- Affiliations: China Ordnance Collaborative Innovation Alliance (B8 Alliance)
- President: Liu Xiaokang (刘小康)
- Party Secretary: Kang Qian (康骞)
- Academic staff: 2,048 (2024)
- Students: 33,000+ (2026)
- Postgraduates: 6,600+ (2026)
- Location: 69 Hongguang Avenue, Banan, Chongqing (Huaxi campus), Chongqing, China
- Campus: Urban; three campuses (Huaxi, Liangjiang and Yangjiaping); 1.11 million m² of floor space
- Colors: Blue and white
- Website: www.cqut.edu.cn

Chongqing University of Technology (CQUT; Chinese: 重庆理工大学) is a public research university in Chongqing, China. It is administered by the Chongqing Municipal People's Government through the Chongqing Municipal Education Commission, and is designated by the municipality as a key university for development and as a university for high-level "emerging engineering" education.

The university traces its origins to the 11th Technical School of the Ordnance Department of the Nationalist government, founded on 18 September 1940 during the Second Sino-Japanese War and known publicly as the Shiji Public School (士继公学). The school was attached to the 21st Arsenal, the predecessor of Changan Automobile, and its first president was the ordnance engineer Li Chenggan (李承干). For most of the second half of the 20th century the institution was administered by China's ordnance-industry ministries; it is one of the seven undergraduate institutions historically affiliated with that sector (known in Chinese as the "Seven Sons of Ordnance", 兵工七子) and is the only general undergraduate university in Southwest China with an ordnance-industry background. It was transferred to the Chongqing municipal government in 1999 and adopted its present name in 2009.

CQUT enrols more than 33,000 full-time undergraduate, postgraduate and international students across three campuses. It offers 58 undergraduate programmes and holds doctoral degree-granting authority in mechanical engineering, awarded in 2024. Its engineering, materials science and chemistry fields are ranked in the top 1% worldwide in Clarivate's Essential Science Indicators (ESI). The university is best known for its research on time-grating precision displacement measurement, a sensing technology originated by its faculty.

== History ==
=== Wartime origins (1940–1949) ===
The 11th Technical School of the Ordnance Department was established on 18 September 1940 to train skilled workers and technicians for China's wartime arms industry. Because it was attached to the 21st Arsenal in Chongqing, it was commonly called the "21st Arsenal Technical School", while its public name was the Shiji Public School. Premier Zhou Enlai later described the school's founding president, Li Chenggan, as a "national treasure of the ordnance industry", and after 1949 he became the first director of the State Bureau of Metrology of the People's Republic of China. The university keeps his remark that "the only thing worthy of our utmost effort is education" as part of its institutional heritage.

One of the school's alumni, the revolutionary martyr Yu Zusheng (余祖胜), was the real-life model for Yu Xinjiang, a principal character in the novel Red Crag. The university keeps a memorial exhibition room in his honour.

=== Ordnance-industry era (1950–1999) ===
In April 1950 the school was renamed the 21st Factory Industrial Vocational School with the approval of the Industry Department of the Southwest Military and Political Committee. Later that year it became the Industrial School of that department. It was renamed several more times in the 1950s, including as the Southwest No. 1 Industrial School of the Second Ministry of Machine-Building and the Chongqing No. 1 Machinery Manufacturing Industrial School. In 1957 the metal-cutting programme of the Kunming Instrument Manufacturing Industrial School was merged into it.

The school was upgraded to the Chongqing Industrial Junior College in March 1960. In April 1965 it was upgraded to the Chongqing Industrial Institute under the Fifth Ministry of Machine-Building, which oversaw the conventional weapons industry. In 1986 the State Education Commission approved its reorganisation as the Chongqing Institute of Industrial Management. It was then supervised in turn by the Ministry of Ordnance Industry, the State Machinery Industry Commission and the Ministry of Machinery and Electronics Industry, before coming under the China North Industries Corporation in 1991.

=== Chongqing Institute of Technology (1999–2009) ===
In May 1999 the institution was transferred from the China North Industries Corporation to the Chongqing municipal government under a model of joint central–local support with local administration. It was renamed the Chongqing Institute of Technology in the same year. In 2001 the Chongqing Economic Management Cadre College was merged into it, and the municipal government designated it as the basis for a future Chongqing University of Technology. The institute received master's degree-granting authority in 2003, and its 100 ha (250 acres) Huaxi campus opened in September 2005.

=== Chongqing University of Technology (2009–present) ===
The Ministry of Education approved the renaming of the institute as Chongqing University of Technology on 26 March 2009. The Liangjiang campus in the Liangjiang New Area opened in September 2014. In 2018 the university was included in the Ministry of Education's first group of "emerging engineering education" research and practice projects. In the same year it joined Beijing Institute of Technology and other universities with ordnance-industry roots to form the China Ordnance Collaborative Innovation Alliance, known as the B8 Alliance. It was named among the first Bases for the Transformation and Transfer of Scientific and Technological Achievements in Higher Education Institutions, and it is a national intellectual property pilot university.

In 2024 the Academic Degrees Committee of the State Council approved CQUT as a doctoral degree-granting institution. It received authority to award doctorates in the first-level discipline of mechanical engineering and a professional doctorate in mechanical engineering. In June 2024 Liu Xiaokang, a mechanical engineer and member of the 14th National Committee of the Chinese People's Political Consultative Conference, was appointed president. In 2025 the university was named a National Civilized Campus. It also set up its own doctoral programme in low-altitude technology and engineering, and was selected for the Ministry of Education's first group of 39 comprehensive higher education reform pilot universities.

=== Name changes ===
Principal names of the institution
Period	Name	Supervising authority
1940–1950	11th Technical School of the Ordnance Department (Shiji Public School)	Ordnance Department, Nationalist government
1950–1960	21st Factory Industrial Vocational School; later Southwest No. 1 Industrial School and Chongqing No. 1 Machinery Manufacturing Industrial School	Southwest Military and Political Committee; Second Ministry of Machine-Building
1960–1965	Chongqing Industrial Junior College	—
1965–1986	Chongqing Industrial Institute	Fifth Ministry of Machine-Building
1986–1999	Chongqing Institute of Industrial Management	Ordnance-industry ministries; China North Industries Corporation (from 1991)
1999–2009	Chongqing Institute of Technology	Chongqing Municipal People's Government
2009–present	Chongqing University of Technology	Chongqing Municipal People's Government

== Campuses ==
The university has three campuses with a combined floor area of about 1.11 million square metres.

Huaxi campus

The main campus is at 69 Hongguang Avenue in Banan District and opened in September 2005. It covers about 100 ha (250 acres) (1,500 mu) and houses schools including Mechanical Engineering, Chemistry and Chemical Engineering, and Management. Its campus plan received a first-class award for excellent planning and design from the Ministry of Education. The campus has also been named one of Chongqing's "Top Ten Garden-style Institutions".

Liangjiang campus

The Liangjiang campus is at 459 Pufu Avenue in the Liangjiang New Area, near the Liangjiang International Auto City. It was developed jointly with the Liangjiang New Area Administrative Committee, covers more than 700 mu (about 47 ha or 120 acres) and opened in September 2014. It has nearly 10,000 students and more than 600 staff. It is home to the Liangjiang International College, the Liangjiang School of Artificial Intelligence, the School of Applied Technology and the School of Physics and New Energy, and also hosts first-year students from several other schools. In 2026 students of seven schools, including the School of Computer Science and Engineering and the Chongqing Intellectual Property School, were assigned to the campus for all four years of study.

Yangjiaping campus

The Yangjiaping campus in Jiulongpo District is the institution's historic campus. Most teaching has since moved to the Huaxi and Liangjiang campuses.

Campuses at a glance
Campus	Location	Opened	Area	Main functions
Huaxi (main)	69 Hongguang Avenue, Banan District	2005	c. 100 ha (1,500 mu)	Most schools; years 2–4 for many programmes
Liangjiang	459 Pufu Avenue, Liangjiang New Area	2014	c. 47 ha (700+ mu)	International and AI education; first-year students; nearly 10,000 students
Yangjiaping	Jiulongpo District	—	—	Historic campus

== Organisation and administration ==
=== Leadership ===
CQUT operates under the system, standard in Chinese public universities, in which the president works under the leadership of the university's Communist Party committee. As of 2026 the Party secretary is Kang Qian and the president is Liu Xiaokang.

=== Schools and colleges ===
The university's academic units include the following:

Engineering and technology

- School of Vehicle Engineering
- School of Mechanical Engineering
- School of Materials Science and Engineering
- School of Electrical and Electronic Engineering
- School of Computer Science and Engineering
- School of Chemistry and Chemical Engineering
- School of Pharmacy and Bioengineering
- Liangjiang School of Artificial Intelligence

Science

- School of Mathematical Sciences
- School of Physics and New Energy

Business, economics and law

- School of Accounting
- School of Management (School of Innovation and Entrepreneurship)
- School of Economics and Finance
- Chongqing Intellectual Property School
- MBA School

Humanities and other units

- School of Marxism
- School of Languages and Communication
- Liangjiang International College
- School of Applied Technology
- School of Continuing Education
- Department of Physical Education
- Engineering Training and Economics and Management Experimental Centre

== Academics ==
=== Key figures ===
Key figures
Indicator	Figure
Full-time students (2026)	33,000+
of whom postgraduates (2026)	6,600+
Full-time teaching staff (2024)	2,048
Undergraduate programmes enrolling	58
National first-class undergraduate programmes	11
Doctoral degree programmes	3
First-level master's disciplines	16
Professional master's categories	14
Provincial/ministerial-level research platforms	80
Valid Chinese invention patents	1,200+
International partner institutions	78
Graduates since 1940	150,000+

Full-time students, 2023–2024
Level	Share
Undergraduates (26,221)	82.0%
Master's (5,700)	17.8%
International (53)	0.2%
Total: 31,974 full-time students

Full-time teaching staff, 2023–2024
Characteristic	Share
Doctorate holders	59.5%
Aged under 45	59.9%
Senior professional titles	49.5%
Source: Undergraduate Teaching Quality Report 2023–2024

=== Undergraduate education ===
CQUT offers 58 undergraduate programmes in engineering, science, management, economics, law, medicine, literature and interdisciplinary fields. Engineering and science programmes make up more than 60% of the total. Four programmes are designated national characteristic programmes and two are national comprehensive reform pilot programmes. Eleven programmes are national first-class undergraduate programmes:

National first-class undergraduate programmes
Engineering	Management and economics
Mechanical design, manufacturing and automation; Vehicle engineering; Materials forming and control engineering; Measurement and control technology and instruments; Computer science and technology; Software engineering; Pharmaceutical engineering	Accounting; Financial management; Marketing; Finance

The university hosts one of the Ministry of Education's first modern industry colleges, together with national virtual teaching and research offices, experimental teaching demonstration centres, virtual simulation experiment projects and off-campus practice bases. Its faculty have led three projects that won second prizes in the National Teaching Achievement Awards. The university reports that it has educated more than 150,000 graduates since its founding. It has been recognised by the Ministry of Education as one of the "50 Universities with Typical Graduate Employment Experience".

=== Graduate education ===
Degree-granting authority
Level	Programmes
Doctoral (first-level discipline)	Mechanical engineering (authorised 2024)
Doctoral (professional)	Mechanical engineering (authorised 2024)
Doctoral (self-designated)	Low-altitude technology and engineering (2025)
Master's (academic)	16 first-level disciplines
Master's (professional)	14 categories, including MBA, MPA, Master of Professional Accounting, Master of Auditing and Master of Intellectual Property

Fourteen of its disciplines are Chongqing key disciplines under the 14th Five-Year Plan, and mechanical engineering is a Chongqing first-class discipline. The university planned to admit 2,192 master's students in 2026.

=== Rankings ===
CQUT is ranked by both Chinese and international league tables. In the 2026 ShanghaiRanking Best Chinese Universities Ranking it placed 243rd nationally in the main ranking and sixth among Chongqing institutions in that list. In the 2026–2027 U.S. News & World Report Best Global Universities rankings it placed 1653rd worldwide, 665th in Asia and 269th in China. Its strongest subjects were Energy and Fuels (377th) and Physical Chemistry (446th). Three of its fields are in the top 1% of Clarivate's Essential Science Indicators.

Overall rankings
Ranking	Scope	Rank
ShanghaiRanking BCUR 2026	China	243
ShanghaiRanking BCUR 2026	Chongqing	6
U.S. News 2026–27	Global	1653
U.S. News 2026–27	Asia	665
U.S. News 2026–27	China	269

BCUR rank by year
Year	Rank
2022	242
2023	228
2024	237
2025	244
2026	243

U.S. News subject rankings, 2026–27
Subject	Global rank
Energy and Fuels	377
Physical Chemistry	446
Electrical and Electronic Engineering	565
Materials Science	604
Chemistry	631
Engineering	797
Computer Science	827

ESI top 1% fields
Field
Engineering
Materials Science
Chemistry

== Research ==
=== Research platforms ===
CQUT operates 80 research platforms at the provincial or ministerial level or above. These include:

- the Key Laboratory of Advanced Manufacturing Technology for Automobile Parts (Ministry of Education)
- the Engineering Research Center of Mechanical Testing Technology and Equipment (Ministry of Education)
- an international joint laboratory of the Ministry of Education
- the Collaborative Innovation Center for High-end Equipment Technology, one of the first such centres co-built by the Ministry of Education and a provincial-level government

Other designations held by the university include:

- a national university science park, the only one at a Chongqing municipal university
- one of the first Bases for the Transformation and Transfer of Scientific and Technological Achievements in Higher Education Institutions
- National Intellectual Property Pilot University
- host of the Chongqing Geometry and Topology Basic Science Research Center

=== Time-grating measurement ===
In 1996 professor Peng Donglin (彭东林) proposed the theory of "time grating". The method uses time pulses, rather than precisely engraved physical scales, as the reference for measuring displacement, an approach summarised as "measuring space with time". The National Natural Science Foundation of China (NSFC) funded his initial work. Peng moved from Chongqing University to the then Chongqing Institute of Technology in 2000.

In 2004 the China Testing Technology Research Institute verified that the team's time-grating sensor reached an accuracy of 0.8 arcseconds. The work received a China Patent Gold Award in 2008 and a second-class State Technological Invention Award in 2010. The time-grating sensor has been described as the first sensor invented and named in China to appear in university textbooks. Later work led by Liu Xiaokang extended the technology to nanometre-scale precision. Nano time-grating displacement measurement was shown at China's national exhibition of scientific and technological achievements of the 13th Five-Year Plan in 2021.

In 2021 China General Technology Group and the university set up a joint company to commercialise the technology. The university holds more than 50 Chinese and 12 international invention patents related to time grating. The team has also used the technology to build ultra-precision worm-gear machine tools under a national major scientific instrument project.

=== Mathematics ===
The Mathematical Sciences Research Center was established in 2019 and is directed by Kefeng Liu, a Morningside Medal laureate and professor at the University of California, Los Angeles. On 21 March 2023 the center became the base of the Chongqing Geometry and Topology Basic Science Research Center, one of the municipality's first three basic science research centres. Its academic committee is chaired by Zhang Weiping, a member of the Chinese Academy of Sciences. The university has hosted the 6th China–Japan Geometry Conference, among other meetings. A School of Mathematical Sciences was set up alongside the research centre.

=== Funding, awards and technology transfer ===
The university reports that it has undertaken more than 3,200 national and provincial or ministerial research projects. These include projects under the National Key Research and Development Program and the NSFC's National Major Scientific Research Instrument Development Program.

In the NSFC's 2026 regular funding cycle, announced in August 2026, the university received 57 projects: 13 General Program grants and 44 Young Scientists Fund (Category C) grants, with total direct funding of ¥19.55 million. Both figures were records for the university. The number of projects was 72.7% higher than in 2025 and the direct funding 51.6% higher.

NSFC regular-cycle funding
Year	General Program	Young Scientists Fund (C)	Total projects	Direct funding
2025	—	—	33 (Note: Calculated from the growth rates reported by the university for 2026 (projects +72.73%, funding +51.55%).)	¥12.90 million
2026	13	44	57	¥19.55 million
Change			+72.7%	+51.6%

Notable individual grants include:

- the university's first National Science Fund for Distinguished Young Scholars, awarded to Liu Xiaokang in 2021. In that year Chongqing University was the only other university in Chongqing to receive one.
- an NSFC Excellent Young Scientists Fund grant awarded to the mathematician Wan Xueyuan in 2022
- 17 national defence science and technology projects with total approved funding of ¥17.8 million

Research output (cumulative)
Indicator	Number
State Science and Technology Progress Awards	4
State Technological Invention Awards	1
China Patent Gold Awards	1
China Patent Excellence Awards	1
Provincial or ministerial awards	208
National and provincial research projects	3,200+
Valid Chinese invention patents	1,200+
Foreign patents	24

Faculty members have received four State Science and Technology Progress Awards, one State Technological Invention Award, a China Patent Gold Award, a China Patent Excellence Award and 208 provincial or ministerial awards. The university holds more than 1,200 valid Chinese invention patents and 24 foreign patents. During the 14th Five-Year Plan period (2021–2025), the university commercialised more than 3,900 scientific and technological achievements with a combined value of over ¥1 billion. The value of its patent-transfer contracts has ranked among the top 50 Chinese universities for two consecutive years.

=== Journals ===
The university's journal office publishes six academic journals. The best known is CAAI Transactions on Intelligence Technology (Chinese: 智能技术学报). The journal was founded jointly by CQUT and the Chinese Association for Artificial Intelligence (CAAI) as the CAAI's society journal. It was prepared from 2014 and launched in 2016. It is published by the Institution of Engineering and Technology (IET) through Wiley, and copyright is held jointly by the IET and CQUT. It was added to the Science Citation Index Expanded in November 2021. Its first Journal Impact Factor, 7.985, placed it in the top quartile (Q1) of Journal Citation Reports in artificial intelligence. In 2026 the publisher listed a Journal Impact Factor of 5.1 and a CiteScore of 14.5. The editors-in-chief were Dai Qionghai of Tsinghua University and Cesare Alippi of the Polytechnic University of Milan. The journal's editorial office receives professional support from the CQUT journal office.

Journals published by the university
Title	Language	Notes
CAAI Transactions on Intelligence Technology	English	Co-founded with CAAI; published by IET/Wiley; indexed in SCIE
Journal of Chongqing University of Technology (Natural Science)	Chinese	
Journal of Chongqing University of Technology (Social Science)	Chinese	
Journal of Ordnance Equipment Engineering	Chinese	
Two further English-language journals	English	

The university also organises the Asian Conference on Artificial Intelligence Technology (ACAIT). Since 2021 the conference has been co-organised by CAAI and the IEEE Computational Intelligence Society, and its proceedings are published by the IEEE.

== Faculty ==
At the end of the 2023–2024 academic year the university had 2,048 full-time teaching staff. Of these, 1,013 (49.5%) held senior professional titles, 1,218 (59.5%) held doctorates and 1,227 (59.9%) were under 45. That year it enrolled 31,974 full-time students, including 26,221 undergraduates and 5,700 master's students. It reports more than 370 instances of provincial-level or higher talent awards among its staff. Recipients include holders of the National Science Fund for Distinguished Young Scholars, Changjiang Scholars, national-level selectees of the Hundred-Thousand-Ten-Thousand Talent Project and National Outstanding Young and Middle-aged Experts. Faculty members include a fellow of the International Society for Nanomanufacturing (ISNM), who chairs its Young Scientists Committee, and a fellow of the International Institute of Acoustics and Vibration (IIAV). Several faculty members appear on the global list of the top 2% of scientists.

== International cooperation ==
=== Overview ===
CQUT has exchange and cooperation agreements with 78 universities and research institutions in more than 20 countries and regions, including the United States, the United Kingdom, France, Spain, Russia and South Korea. Between 2021 and 2025 it signed strategic cooperation agreements with 36 institutions and companies in 18 countries and regions, sent 24 teaching and research delegations abroad and received 336 visiting scholars. The university is a member of the Sino-Polish University Consortium under the Belt and Road Initiative, the China–Belarus Basic Science Research Centre and the China–Arab States "10+10" university cooperation programme, and it led the founding of a university alliance for intellectual property cooperation along the New International Land–Sea Trade Corridor. Its international joint laboratory for intelligent manufacturing and control of key components of energy-saving and new energy vehicles, approved by the Ministry of Education, was established with research institutions in Canada, South Korea, Japan, Russia and Hungary.

=== Partnership with KAIST ===
The university's most prominent international partnership is with KAIST (Korea Advanced Institute of Science and Technology). The Chongqing Liangjiang KAIST International Program was set up by CQUT, KAIST and the Liangjiang New Area administration and is run through the Liangjiang International College, which was founded in 2014 on the Liangjiang campus in the China–South Korea Industrial Park. The Ministry of Education approved two four-year Sino-foreign cooperative undergraduate programmes, in electronic information engineering and in computer science and technology, each with an annual intake of 100 students. Both are taught in English following the KAIST curriculum, with instructors from KAIST and other countries, and qualifying students could also receive a KAIST degree. The programmes enrolled students from 2014 to 2019 and again in 2021.

In 2016 the programme added a master's degree in information and communication engineering, described at the time as the first postgraduate-level Sino-foreign cooperative programme at a Chongqing municipal university. Students follow a "1+1+1" model under which those who meet KAIST's requirements spend their second year at KAIST, with a KAIST supervisor and a CQUT co-supervisor, and may receive a KAIST master's degree alongside the CQUT degree. Thirteen master's students from the 2016–2018 cohorts were selected to study at KAIST. A KAIST professor recruited through the programme was selected in 2017 for China's national programme for foreign experts. The two universities continue to run the programme through a joint management committee, which held its eighth meeting in October 2024. The Liangjiang International College has since broadened its role; it now also runs the university's undergraduate programme in teaching Chinese to speakers of other languages and manages the university's roughly 300 international students from more than 40 countries.

Sino-foreign cooperative programmes with KAIST
Programme	Level	Approved intake	Enrolment years	Degrees
Electronic information engineering	Bachelor's (4 years)	100 per year	2014–2019, 2021	CQUT bachelor's degree; KAIST BSc in Electrical Engineering for qualifying students
Computer science and technology	Bachelor's (4 years)	100 per year	2014–2019, 2021	CQUT bachelor's degree; KAIST degree for students who study one year abroad
Information and communication engineering	Master's (3 years)	30 in the first intake	From 2016	CQUT master's degree; KAIST master's degree for qualifying students

=== Partner institutions ===
The university lists the following among its international partner institutions:

Region	Institutions
East Asia	KAIST and Myongji University (South Korea); Kobe University, Yamaguchi University, University of Miyazaki and Fukushima University (Japan)
Southeast Asia	National University of Malaysia; Rajamangala University of Technology Rattanakosin (Thailand); Hanoi Open University (Vietnam); PSB Academy (Singapore)
Europe	Queen Mary University of London and Swansea University (United Kingdom); Poznań University of Technology and SWPS University (Poland); VSB – Technical University of Ostrava (Czech Republic); Tomsk Polytechnic University (Russia); Yanka Kupala State University of Grodno (Belarus); Satakunta University of Applied Sciences (Finland); Letterkenny Institute of Technology (Ireland); National Aviation University and Kyiv Polytechnic Institute (Ukraine)
North America	University of Wisconsin–Madison and Indiana University–Purdue University Indianapolis (United States)
Oceania	Royal Melbourne Institute of Technology and Deakin University (Australia)

=== International students and education abroad ===
For 2025 the university offered 16 undergraduate programmes, 19 master's programmes and one doctoral programme to international students, together with a Chinese language programme. More than 900 international students from 50 countries have studied at the university, which has been approved five times for the Chongqing Mayor's Scholarship for international students under the "Silk Road" programme. It has also trained more than 120 intellectual-property officials from Belt and Road countries, and 527 of its own students have received scholarships for study abroad.

Under a programme the university calls "education going abroad with Chongqing vehicles", it works with Chinese automotive companies that export to Southeast Asia. In November 2024 it hosted the Cambodia session of the International Industry–University–Research Cooperation Conference (Chongqing), at which it founded a Belt and Road automotive industry–education consortium and signed strategic agreements with Seres Group and GRG Metrology & Test. The university then established the China–Cambodia New Energy Vehicle and Industrial Technology Institute (NEVITI Cambodia), helped draft a Cambodian automotive industry standard and ran a "Chongqing Vehicle Workshop" training course for Cambodian technicians.

=== Domestic partnerships ===
Within China, the university has strategic partnerships with:

- universities and research institutes, including Beijing Institute of Technology, Harbin Institute of Technology, Northwestern Polytechnical University and the China Academy of Ordnance Science
- industrial companies, including China North Industries Group, China General Technology Group, Changan Automobile and Seres Group

== Student life ==
=== Competitions ===
Students have won more than 800 national-level or higher awards in academic competitions during the 14th Five-Year Plan period. Notable results include:

- a national first prize at the 2021 National College Student Robot Competition (Robocon), won by the university's Shiji Robot Team, the first such result for both the university and Chongqing
- first place nationally and a special prize at the 2021 China–US Young Maker Competition
- a national silver award at the 8th China International "Internet+" College Students' Innovation and Entrepreneurship Competition
- by 2023, six national second prizes and four national third prizes in the Formula Student China competition, for which the university fields both combustion and electric teams

=== Scholarships and student awards ===
The university's most prominent campus-wide student honour is the annual Marubi Top Ten Students award ("丸美"十佳大学生). The university publishes a profile of each recipient. The award is funded by the alumnus Sun Huaiqing, founder, chairman and chief executive of the cosmetics company Marubi (丸美). Recipients in 2024 included an industrial design student who held a National Scholarship and helped design the body of the university's combustion-engine Formula Student car, which won a national third prize in the 2023 season.

Sun gave more than ¥1.8 million to the university between 2015 and 2020. In November 2020, during the university's 80th anniversary, he donated ¥10 million to establish the Marubi Fund, which supports the Top Ten Students award and several school-level awards. By 2023 nearly 100 students a year were receiving Marubi-funded awards.

Marubi-funded student awards
Award	Unit	Marubi funding since
Marubi Top Ten Students	University-wide	2015
Marubi Jingjin Pioneer	School of Economics and Finance	2018
Marubi Star of Pharmacy and Bioengineering	School of Pharmacy and Bioengineering	2020
Marubi Outstanding Chemical Engineer	School of Chemistry and Chemical Engineering	2020

=== Heritage ===
Student organisations commemorate the university's revolutionary heritage. The "Yu Zusheng Class" Party branch was recognised as a national model graduate student Party branch.

== Notable people ==
=== Faculty and administrators ===
- Li Chenggan (李承干), ordnance engineer, founding president and later first director of the State Bureau of Metrology
- Kefeng Liu, mathematician, director of the Mathematical Sciences Research Center
- Liu Xiaokang (刘小康), mechanical engineer, recipient of the National Science Fund for Distinguished Young Scholars, and president of the university since 2024
- Peng Donglin (彭东林), engineer who originated time-grating sensing technology
- Wan Xueyuan (万学远), mathematician specialising in complex geometry

=== Alumni ===
- Sun Huaiqing (孙怀庆), class of 1987, founder, chairman and chief executive of Marubi, a cosmetics company listed on the Shanghai Stock Exchange in 2019, and benefactor of the Marubi Fund
- Yu Zusheng (余祖胜), revolutionary martyr and the model for Yu Xinjiang in Red Crag
- Yao Rufang (尧汝芳), engineer and 1956 graduate of the Southwest Industrial School, who stayed on to teach and was named a national advanced individual in culture and education in 1960

== See also ==
- List of universities and colleges in Chongqing
- Chongqing University
