= Twelve Views of Bayu =

Popular scenic views in and around the city of Chongqing, China

Twelve Views of Bayu (Chinese: 巴渝十二景) are popular scenic views in and around the city of Chongqing, China. Ba and Yu (Chinese: 巴渝; pinyin: Bāyú) are old names of Chongqing in Imperial times. Influenced by Eight Views of Xiaoxiang in Hunan Province, people in Chongqing listed their own most beloved views during the reign of the Tianshun Emperor of the Ming dynasty. Scenic views in the list changed throughout the history. Some scenic views appeared in earlier lists no longer exist in modern days due to the change of physical geography, landscapes and land-uses.

== Original Eight Views ==
The first version of the list contains eight popular scenic views, the same number of views in the Xiaoxiang list. In the second year of Tianshun Emperor's reign (1453), people carved the list on to the bronze bell in Chongyin Temple (later renamed as Chang'an Temple), a former Buddhism temple located at current Chongqing No. 25 Middle School's campus. The eight views on the original list are:

- Jin Bi Xiang Feng (Chinese: 金碧香风; lit. 'Fragrant wind in Jinbi Mountain'): Jinbi Mountain is the highest peak of Mountain Ba, and currently it is part of the Renmin Park in Yuzhong District. Jinbi literally means golden and blue. During the Song dynasty, a governor of Chongqing built a hall with golden and blue tiles on top of the mountain. During the Ming dynasty, another governor of Chongqing raised many species of flowers on the mountain and made the air there smells balmiest.
- Hong Yan Di Cui (洪岩滴翠; 'Clear water drops down from the Hongyan Cave'): Hongyan (now called Hongya, 洪崖) literally means waterful cliff. It is located near the riverside area of modern Yuzhong District and close to the Chongqing CBD. Today it is known for the clustered Diaojiaolou buildings. There is a cave on the cliff, and spring water flows out of the cave and drops down the cliff.
- Long Men Hao Yue (龙门浩月; 'Bright moon of the Long Men'): Long Men literally means Gate of Chinese Dragon. There used to be two giant rock in the near-shore shallow water of Yangtze River, on which there were two big Chinese characters Long Men carved during the Song dynasty. In clear nights, the inverted image of the moon will appear in between those two rocks and makes there to be a beautiful scene. It is now a part of Nanbin Park in Nan'an District.
- Huang Ge Wan Du (黄葛晚渡; 'The night view at Huang Ge Ferry'): Huang Ge Ferry was a major ferry crossing the Yangtze River and connecting the main town of Chongqing (today's Yuzhong District) and the Nanping Town (the core area of today's Nan'an District) in previous times. Huang Ge is the local name of ficus virens, a type of tree distributed in Asia and Australia. The Shibanpo Yangtze River Bridge replaced Huang Ge Ferry in 1980s, so that the ferry no longer exists. However, this scene is still manually preserved and become a part of Nanbin Park in 2005.
- Fo Tu Ye Yu (佛图夜雨; 'Yeyu Temple in Fotu Pass'): Fotu Pass was located to the west of today's Chongqing CBD area, close to Pipa Mountain Park and Eling Park, and it was an important military fort to defend Chongqing from the west in ancient times. Yeyu Temple was a major temple in Fotu Pass. Yeyu literally means raining at night. Years ago, there was a rock in the front of Yeyu Temple, and water permeated out of the rock every night and made the air moist, as if it were rainy. As a result, people call the rock Yeyu Shi (Rock that raining at night) and called the temple Yeyu Temple.
- Kong Dian Qiu Xiang (孔殿秋香; 'Autumn's fragrance in the Confucian temple'): During the Ming dynasty, there was a Confucian temple in today's Chongqing No.29 Middle School's campus. During autumn, guihua flowers would be in full bloom and bring fragrance to the temple.
- Jue Lin Xiao Zhong (觉林晓钟; 'The sound of bell in the morning at Juelin Temple'): Juelin Temple, located in the forest of Lianhua Mountain in Nan'an District, was built during the Song dynasty. Every morning, monks in the temple would ring the bell (just like any other monks in buddhism temples in China), and the sound of bell made people be joyful. In last years of the Ming dynasty, the temple and the bell were destroyed in wars and chaos. During the Qing dynasty, the temple was rebuilt and turned to be even more glorious. It had its own Eight Views, but the Jue Lin Xiao Zhong was removed from later lists.
- Bei Zhen Jin Sha (北镇金沙; 'Golden sands of the northern town'): The northern town refers to the old Jiangbei Town (part of today's Jiangbei District). Jiangbei Town was located near the place where Jialing River merges into Yangtze River. At the northern bank of where the two river merge, there is a sandy beach. Under the sun, sands on the beach shines like gold.

== Traditional Twelve Views ==
Chongqing is a major city with diverse landscapes and culture. The original eight views were not able to present all popular scenic views in Chongqing. Therefore, the number of views in the list was later expanded from eight to twelve. The traditional twelve views of Chongqing was proposed in 1760 by Wang Erjian (王尔鉴), a county-level governor of Chongqing during the reign of Qianlong Emperor in the Qing dynasty. In the new list, three of former eight views were removed due to various reasons, and several other views in and around Chongqing were added. The twelve views in Wang's list are:

- Jin Bi Liu Xiang (Chinese: 金碧流香; lit. 'Floating fragrance in Jinbi Mountain'): The same view as Jin Bi Xiang Feng in the original list of eight views. See previous section.
- Huang Ge Wan Du (黄葛晚渡; 'The night view at Huang Ge Ferry'): See previous section.
- Tong Jing Xia Yuan (统景峡猿; 'Monkeys in the Tongjing Valley'): Tongjing Valley is a series of river valleys in Yubei District, about 65 kilometers away from the downtown Chongqing. Yulin River and Wentang River cut through mountains and form several deep valleys. Since the Qing dynasty, Tongjing Valley has been known for large numbers of monkeys living in that area. Currently, it is also known for hot springs.
- Ge Le Ling Yin (歌乐灵音; 'Heavenly sound on Gele Mountain'): Geleshan is a mountain range in today's Shapingba District. Currently, this mountain is known for the Red Rock Village, a historic memorial site of Chinese Communist Party. However, during the Qing dynasty, this place was known for the heavenly sound on top of the mountain. The heavenly sound was created by wind blowing through forests in the valley. It made people happy and relaxed.
- Yun Zhuan Feng Qing (云篆风清; 'Cool breeze in Yunzhuan Mountain'): Yunzhuan Mountain is about 8 kilometers away from Yudong Subdistrict in today's Ba'nan District. Yunzhuan Temple, constructed in the 7th year of Chenghua Emperor's reign during the Ming dynasty (1473), was a famous temple in this mountain. Chongqing is considered as one of the stove cities of China, where the temperature in summer is very high. However, people can always feel the cool breeze in Yunzhuan Temple due to its high altitude. Unfortunately, the temple was destroyed during the Cultural Revolution period (1966 - 1976).
- Hong Ya Di Cui (洪崖滴翠; 'Green water drops down from the Hongya Cave'): The same view as Hong Yan Di Cui in the original list of eight views. See previous section.
- Hai Tang Yan Yu (海棠烟雨; 'Misty rain of Haitang Creek'): Haitang Creek is a minor tributary river of Yangtze River in Nan'an District. Originated in the South Mountain, Haitang Creek runs for about 30 miles and flows into the Yangtze. Before modern era, wild haitang flowers were clustered along the creek. During the Tang dynasty, a female poet Xue Tao travelled to Chongqing and visited Haitang Creek in a rainy spring day. She saw the beautiful scene of haitang flowers blooming in misty rain, and then wrote a poem called Haitang Creek, which later made this scene popular. Today, there are no clustered haitang flowers along the creek any more, but a portion of the scene is preserved in Nanbin Park.
- Zi Shui Xiao Deng (字水霄灯; 'The Chinese-character-shaped flowing patterns and the inverted images of lamps in the river'): This view is in Yangtze River. Near the southern bank, the water of Yangtze flows over a series of rocks and reefs. Disturbed by those rocks, river water flows in a pattern that looks like the Chinese character Ba (巴), which is one of Chongqing's former names in ancient time. People was able to see this stream pattern from the southern bank. In the distance, the lamps and street lights of the northern bank are inverted in the river, and light up the character Ba. The water stream pattern was weakened after the construction of Three Gorges Dam which lifted the water level and slowed down the stream speed of Yangtze River in Chongqing However, the relic of this view is still preserved in Nanbin Park.
- Hua Ying Xue Ji (华蓥雪霁; 'The sunshine after snow in Huaying Mountain'): Huaying Mountain is a major mountain range in eastern edge of Sichuan Basin. Chongqing is located in the range and valley province of Huaying Mountain. Chongqing's latitude is about 30 degrees north and it is hard to see snow in downtown Chongqing. However, snow views were available in Huaying Mountain where the elevation is high. Therefore, the rare snow view of Huaying Mountain was listed as one of twelve views of Chongqing.
- Jin Ling Yun Xia (缙岭云霞; 'Rosy clouds in Jinyun Mountain'): Jinyun Mountain is located in today's Beibei District. It is one of major anticline ranges embracing downtown Chongqing. Wang Erjian, the person who proposed this list of views, mentioned in his letter that he liked the evening view of the nine peaks of Jinyun Mountain, when those peaks were colored in rosy by the setting sun and the sunset glow.
- Long Men Hao Yue (龙门浩月; 'Bright moon of the Long Men'): See previous section.
- Fo Tu Ye Yu (佛图夜雨; 'Yeyu Temple in Fotu Pass'): See previous section.

== 1989 List of Twelve Views ==
In April 1989, Chongqing Evening News newspaper, Chongqing TV and Chongqing Department of Parks and Gardens launched an activity that encouraged Chongqing residents to propose a new version of twelve views. This activity lasted for one year. In 1990, the new list of twelve views of Chongqing was released by the Evening newspaper:

- Da Zu Shi Ke (Chinese: 大足石刻; lit. 'Dazu Rock Carvings'): It is one of the most popular grottos in China. It was constructed in the 7th century and located in Dazu County of Chongqing. Now it is a World Heritage Site.
- Shan Cheng Deng Hai (山城灯海; 'Sea of lamps in the mountain city'): It refers to the night view of modern downtown Chongqing. Mountain city is the nickname of Chongqing.
- Si Mian Fei Pu (四面飞瀑; 'Waterfalls in Simian Mountain'): Simian Mountain is a popular tourist attraction near Chongqing.
- Jin Ling Yun Xia (缙岭云霞; 'Rosy clouds in Jinyun Mountain'): See previous section.
- Bei Quan Wen Yong (北泉温泳; 'Swimming in the Northern Hot Spring'): Chongqing is also known as Hot Spring City of China. There are hundreds of hot springs in and around downtown Chongqing. Among them, four are most popular: Northern Hot Spring, Southern Hot Spring, Eastern Hot Spring and Tongjing Hot Spring. The Northern Hot Spring is a part of Wenquan Si (温泉寺; 'Hot spring temple'), which was constructed in the year of 423, during the Northern and Southern dynasties. In 1927, Lu Zuofu turned this temple into a park open to public.
- Nan Shan Zui Hua (南山醉花; 'Being intoxicated with the flowers in South Mountain'): South Mountain is located in southeastern edge of downtown Chongqing, and it is known for gardens with hundreds of flower species. This view is well preserved in Nanshan Park and South Mountain Botanical Garden.
- Ge Le Ling Yin (歌乐灵音; 'Heavenly sound on Gele Mountain'): See previous section.
- Tong Jing Xia Yuan (统景峡猿; 'Monkeys in the Tongjing Valley'): See previous section.
- Chang Hu Lang Yu (长湖浪屿; 'Waves and islands in Changshou Lake'): Located in Changshou District of Chongqing, Changshou Lake is the largest water body by size (65.5 square kilometers) in Chongqing Municipality. The lake is known for hundreds of islands, one of which looks like the character Shou (寿; 'longevity').
- Du Diao Zhong Yuan (独钓中原; 'Angling alone in China proper'): This view refers to the historical Diaoyu Fortress in Hechuan. Diaoyu means angling or fishing. The fortress played a leading role in the war between the Song dynasty and Mongol Empire. When every where else lost to Mongols, Diaoyu Fortress still stood and fought. In 1259, Mongol leader Möngke Khan was killed in a battle near the fortress, and that forced Mongol soldiers to withdraw from Syria and Europe.
- Nan Tang Xi Qu (南塘溪趣; 'The southern pool and amusing creeks'): The southern pool here refers to the Southern Hot Spring, another popular hot spring of Chongqing.
- Chao Tian Hui Liu (朝天汇流; 'Converging rivers at Chaotianmen'): This view refers to Chaotianmen (朝天门; 'City gate facing the heaven/emperor') and the harbor and square next to it. It is the easternmost city gate of old Chongqing. Outside of the gate is the point where Jialing River flows into Yangtze River.

== 2006 List of Twelve Views ==
In 2006, Chongqing Evening News newspaper launched another activity to propose the current version of twelve views. This time, the Evening newspaper released two separate lists. One for natural scenes only, and another for human landscapes.

=== Natural scenes ===
- A Yi Xiu Shui (Chinese: 阿依秀水; lit. 'Beautiful water view of Ayi River'): This view refers to the Ayi River in Pengshui Miao and Tujia Autonomous County.
- Chang Hu Lang Yu (Chinese: 长湖浪屿; lit. 'Waves and islands in Changshou Lake'): See previous section.
- Fu Rong Di Cui (Chinese: 芙蓉滴翠; lit. 'Clear water drops in Furong Cave'): See Furong Cave.
- Hei Shan You Gu (Chinese: 黑山幽谷; lit. 'The peaceful valley in Black Mountain'): This view refers to the Black Mountain Valley in Wansheng District.
- Nan Quan Xi Qu (Chinese: 南泉溪趣; lit. 'The Southern Hot Spring and amusing creeks'): The same view as Nan Tang Xi Qu in the 1989 list. See previous section.
- Si Mian Fei Pu (Chinese: 四面飞瀑; lit. 'Waterfalls in Simian Mountain'): See previous section.
- Tian Sheng San Qiao (Chinese: 天生三桥; lit. 'Three natural bridges'): See Three Natural Bridges.
- Wu Shan Qi Xia (Chinese: 巫山奇峡; lit. 'Miraculous gorges in Mountain Wu'): It refers to Wu Gorge (one of the Three Gorges) of Yangtze River, the Lesser Three Gorges of Daning River, and the Little Lesser Three Gorges in Wushan County.
- Tong Jing Wen Tang (Chinese: 统景温塘; lit. 'Hot pools in Tongjing'): It refers to hot springs in Tongjing Valley, the same place of Tong Jing Xia Yuan in previous sections.
- Qian Jiang Qi Hai (Chinese: 黔江奇海; lit. 'Miraculous lake in Qianjiang'): This view refers to the Xiaonanhai (literally: Little South Sea) National Geopark in Qianjiang District. It is a barrier lake formed in an earthquake in the 6th year of Xianfeng Emperor's reign of the Qing dynasty (June 1856). The earthquake was of magnitude 6.3 on Richter scale, and it brought down rocks from nearby mountains and dammed the river. The earthquake dam is 1170 meters long, 1040 meters wide and 65 meters tall. The lake is 5 kilometers long and 2.9 square kilometers in size.
- Jin Fo Cui Wei (Chinese: 金佛崔嵬; lit. 'The towering Mount Jinfo'): It refers to the Mount Jinfo, a World Heritage Site in Nanchuan District.
- Huang Shui Lin Hai (Chinese: 黄水林海; lit. 'Sea of woods in Huangshui'): Huangshui is a small town in Shizhu Tujia Autonomous County. It is known for the Huangshui National Forest Park established in 1998.

=== Human Landscapes ===
- Chao Tian Hui Liu (Chinese: 朝天汇流; lit. 'Converging rivers at Chaotianmen'): See previous sections.
- Ci Qi Gu Zhen (Chinese: 瓷器古镇; lit. 'The ancient town of Ciqikou'): See Ciqikou.
- Shan Cheng Ye Jing (Chinese: 山城夜景; lit. 'The night view of the mountain city'): It refers to the night skyline of Chongqing viewed from Single Tree Vista.
- Cai Yun Bai Di (Chinese: 彩云白帝; lit. 'Colorful clouds in Baidicheng'): This phase is derived from a poet written by Li Bai during the Tang dynasty. It refers to the landscape of Baidicheng ancient temple complex in Fengjie County.
- Da Zu Shi Ke (Chinese: 大足石刻; lit. 'Dazu Rock Carvings'): See previous sections.
- Han Feng Xin Cheng (Chinese: 汉丰新城; lit. 'The new town of Hanfeng'): Hanfeng, a township of Kai County, was originally located near the Yangtze River valley. The construction of Three Gorges Dam lifted the water level of Yangtze River, and the old Hanfeng was submerged underwater. The government built a brand new and better planned town of Hanfeng at a higher place.
- Ming Bei Jin Jie (Chinese: 名碑金街; lit. 'The popular tablet and golden street'): It refers to Jiefangbei and the square around it. It is the most important landmark of Chongqing.
- Xi Tuo Tian Jie (Chinese: 西沱天街; lit. 'The heavenly street in Xituo'): Xituo is a well-preserved ancient town in Shizhu Tujia Autonomous County. The Tianjie (heavenly street) of Xituo is known as Number One Street of Yangtze River Valley and the Street Museum of Architecture. Across the Yangtze River from the street, the Shibaozhai stands there.
- Diao Yu Gu Cheng (Chinese: 钓鱼古城; lit. 'The ancient town of Diaoyu Fortress'): The same view as Du Diao Zhong Yuan in the 1989 list. See previous sections.
- Hong Yan Feng Bei (Chinese: 红岩丰碑; lit. 'Monument of Red Rock'): See Red Rock Village.
- Shi Bao Qiong Ge (Chinese: 石宝琼阁; lit. 'The jade building of Shibaozhai'): See Shibaozhai.
- Feng Du Gui Cheng (Chinese: 丰都鬼城; lit. 'The ghost city in Fengdu'): See Fengdu Ghost City.

== Gallery ==
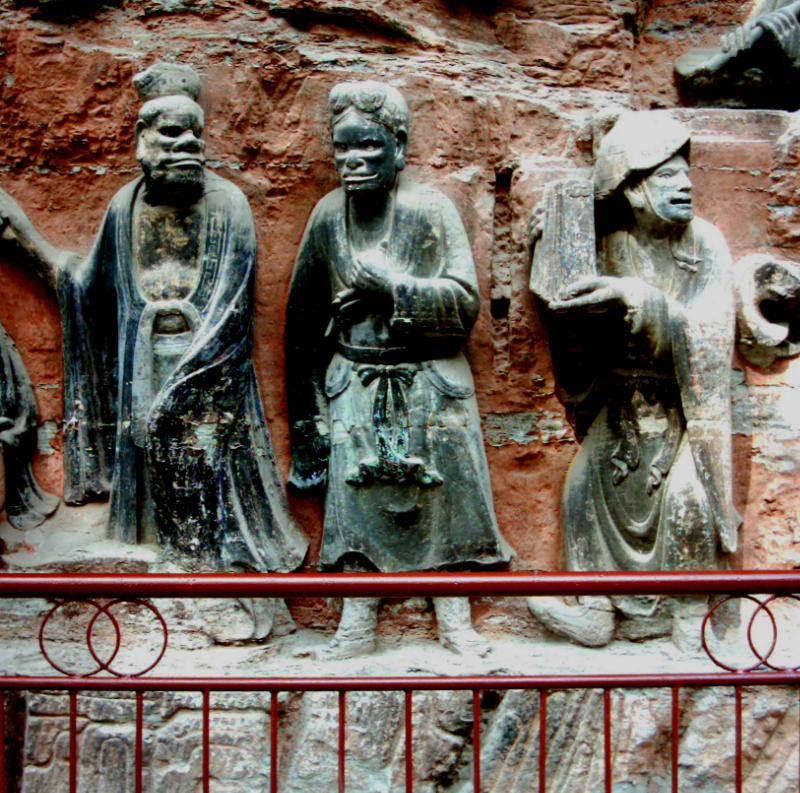
Dazu Rock Carving

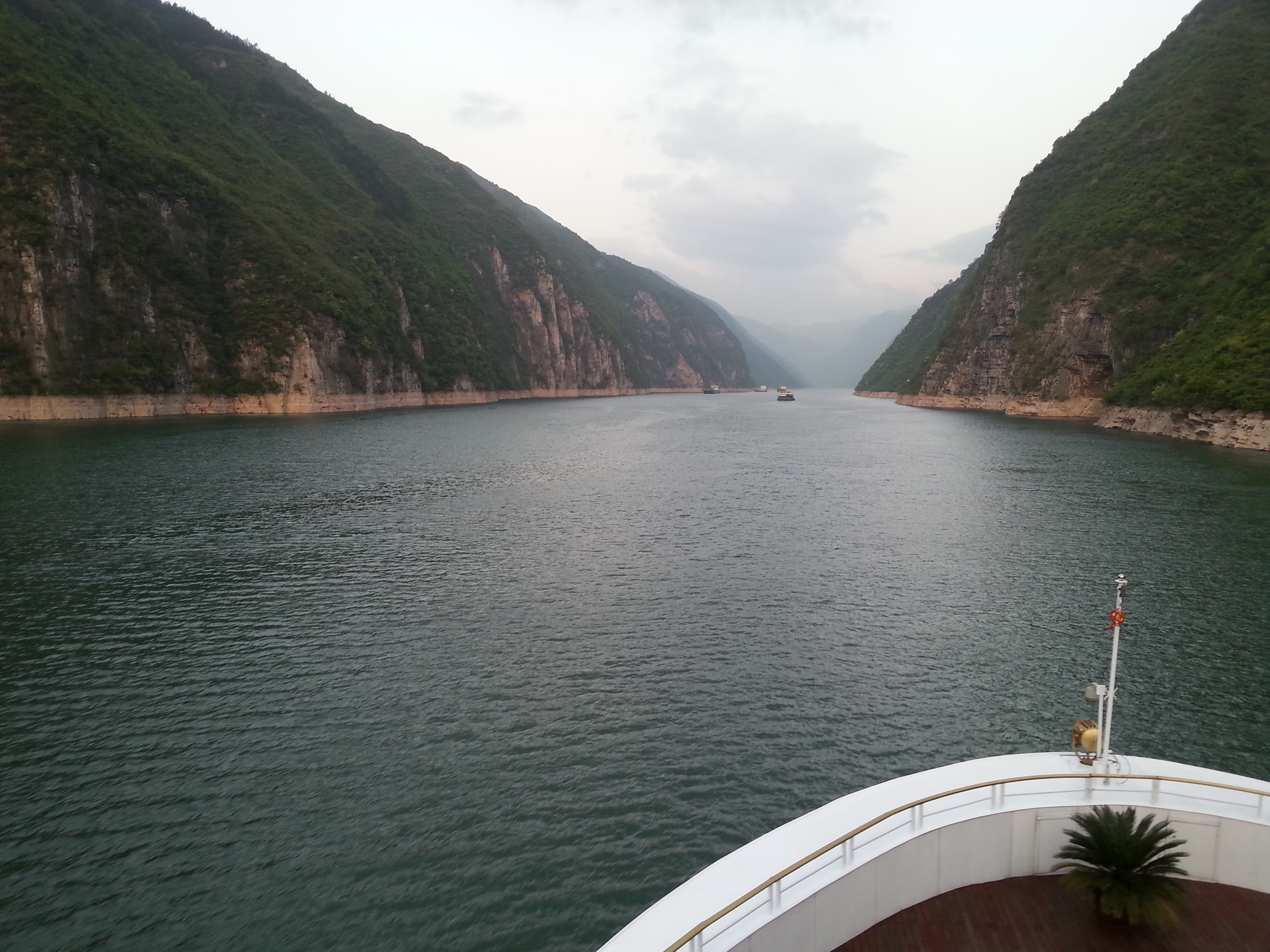
Wu Gorge

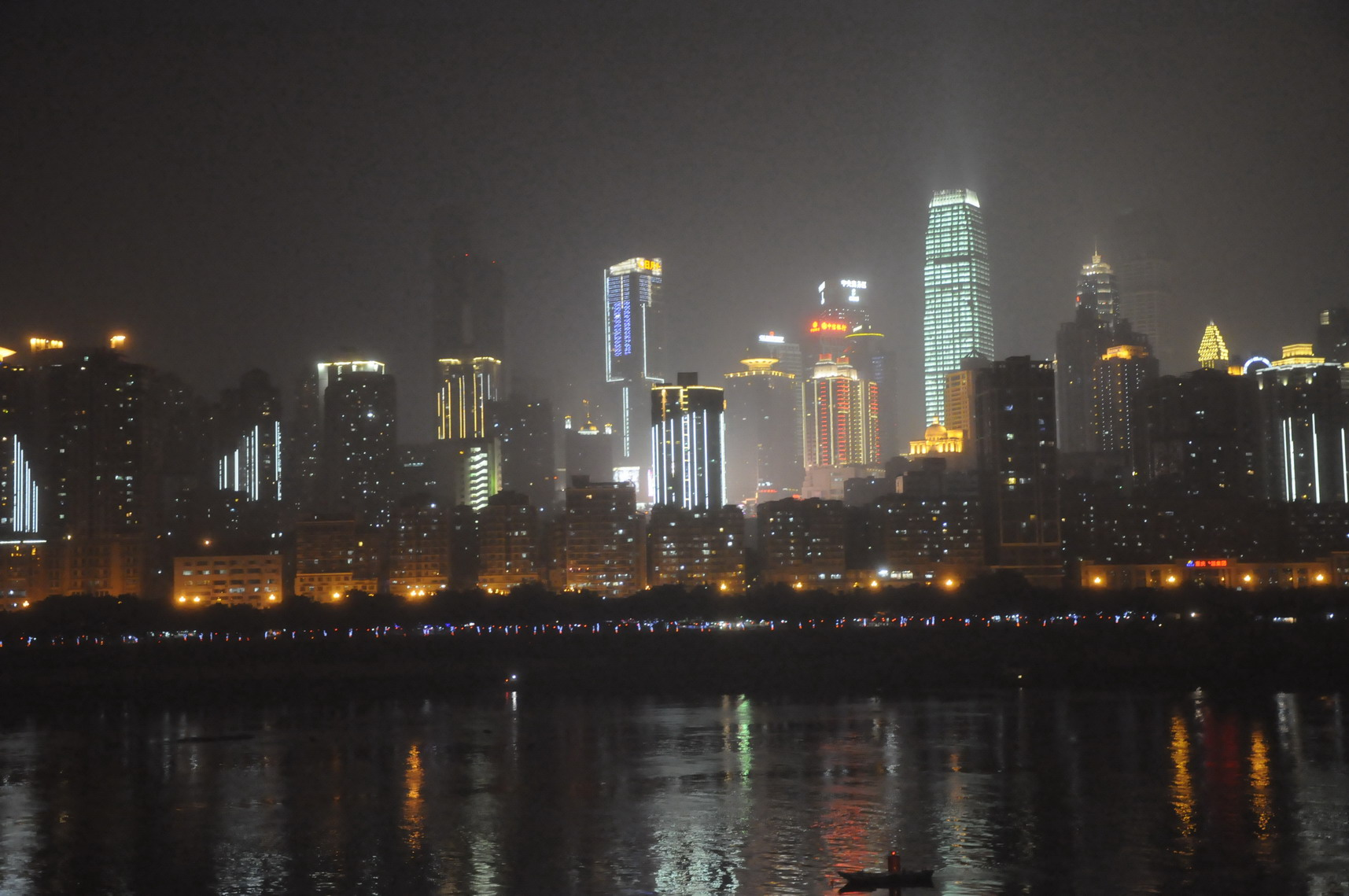
Chongqing Nightview

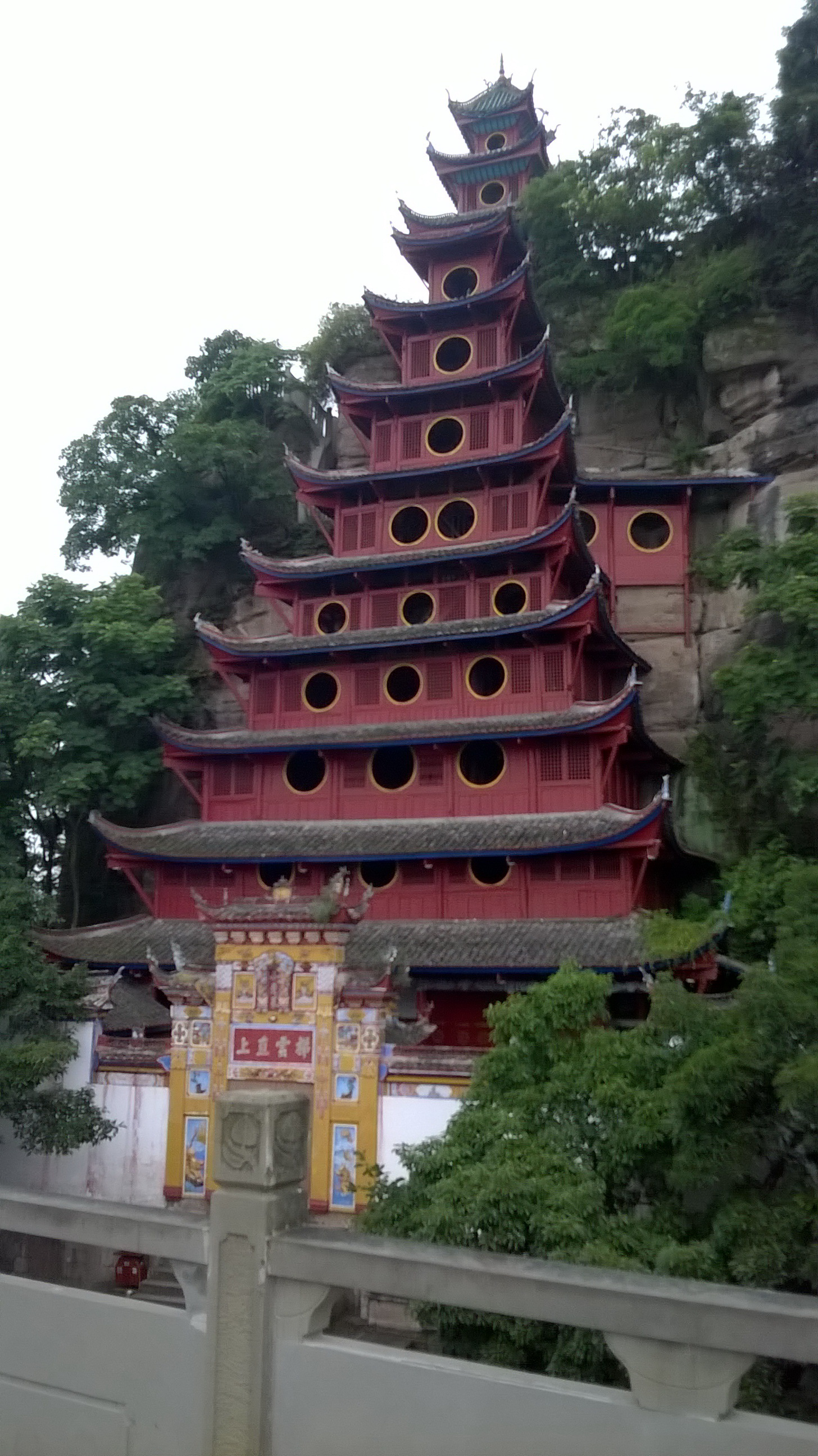
Shibaozhai

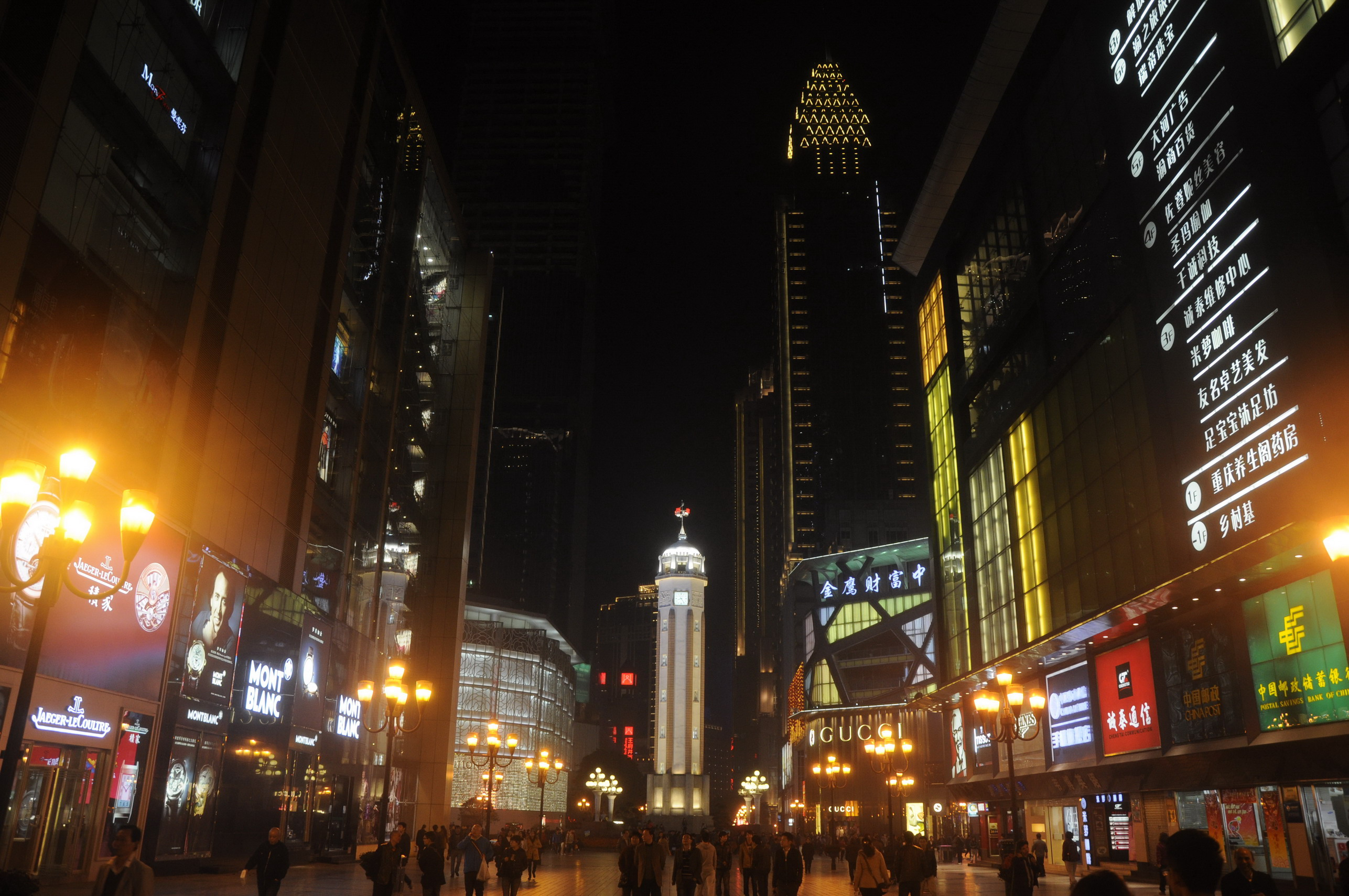
Jiefangbei

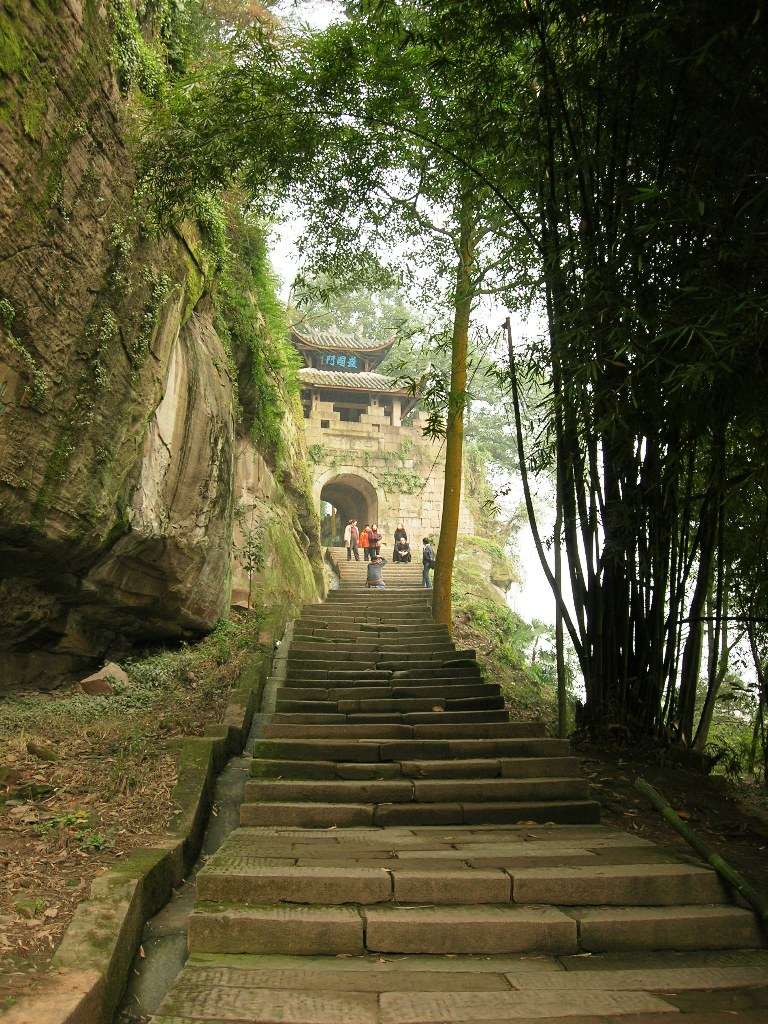
Diaoyu (Angling) Fortress

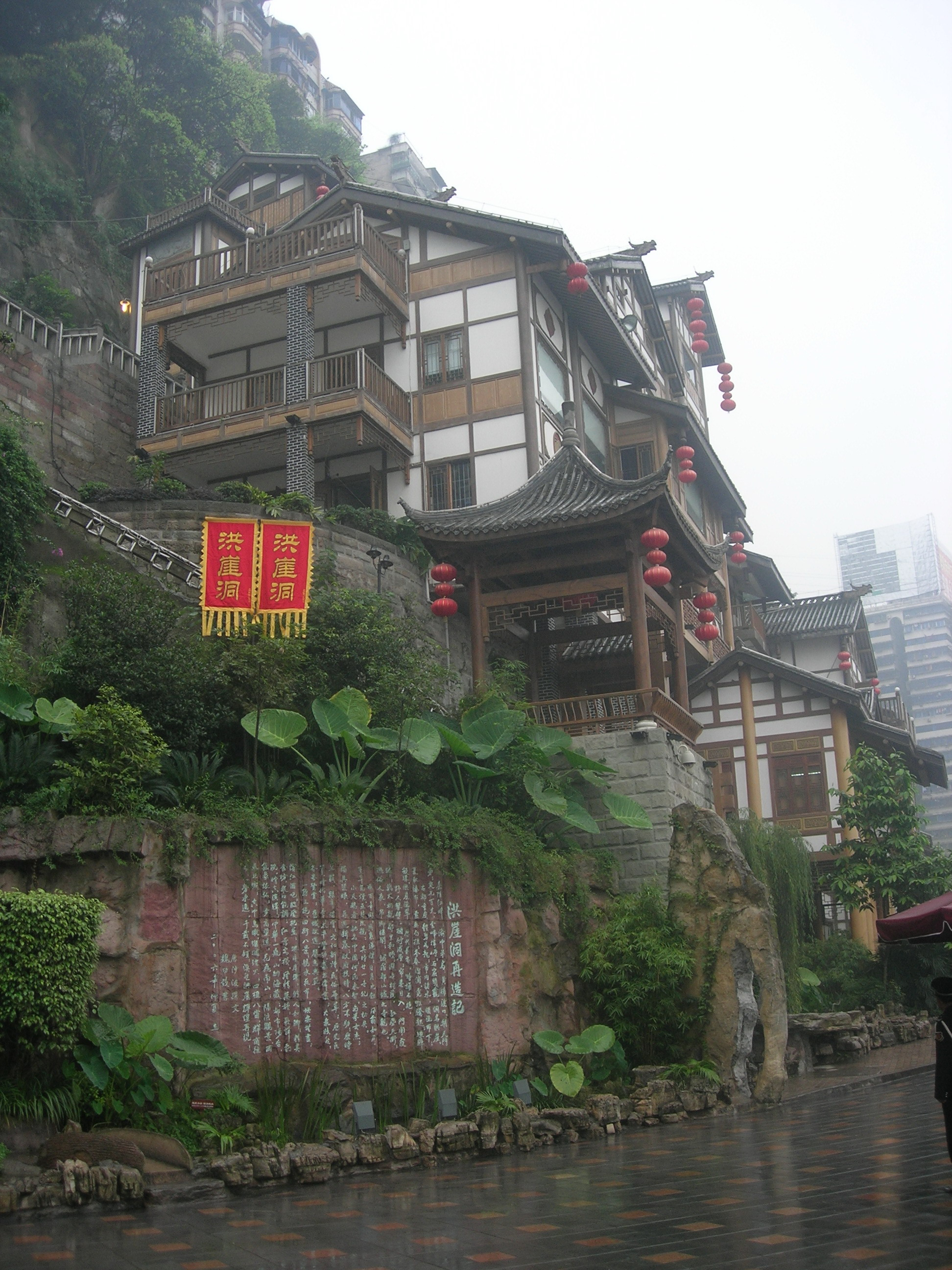
Hongya Cave stilted houses in traditional Bayu-style architecture

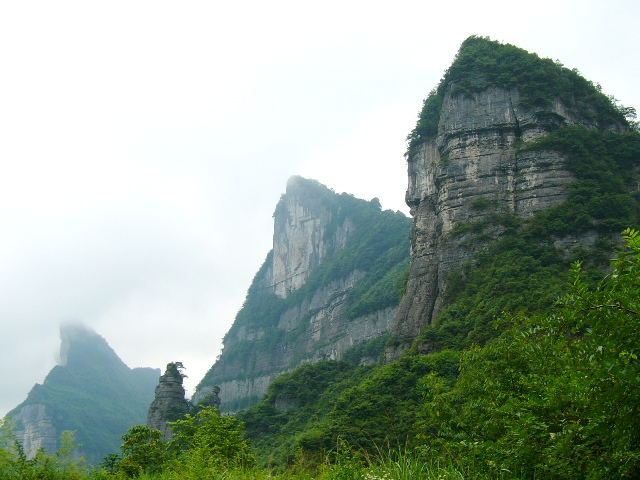
Mount Jinfo

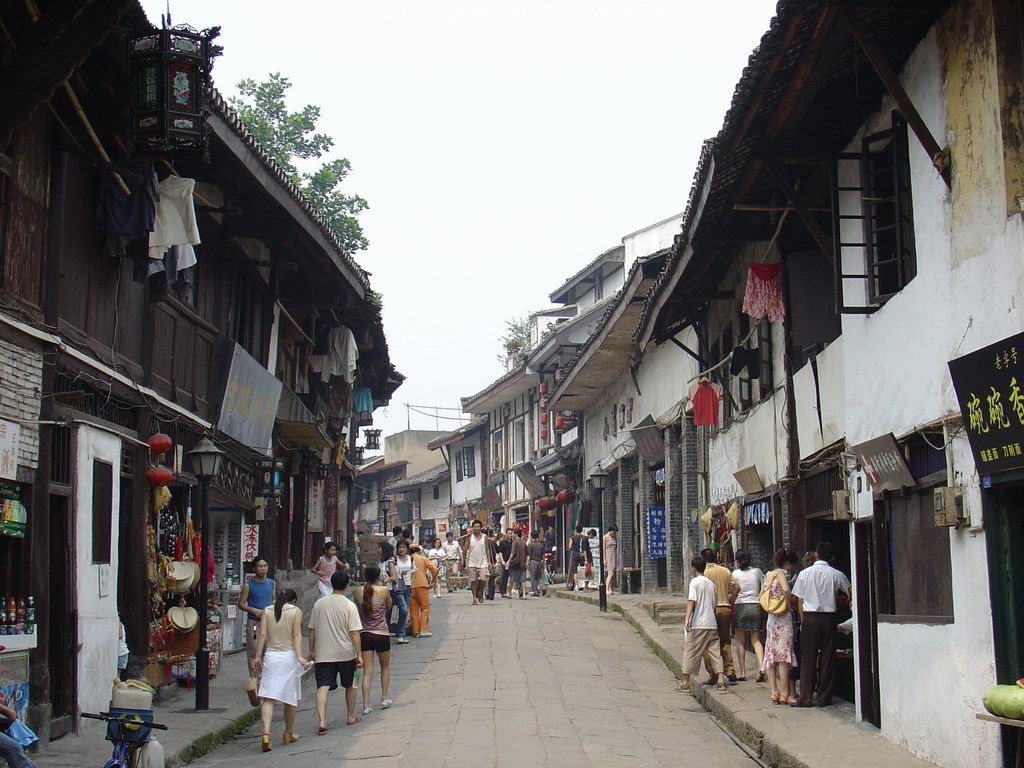
Ciqikou ancient town

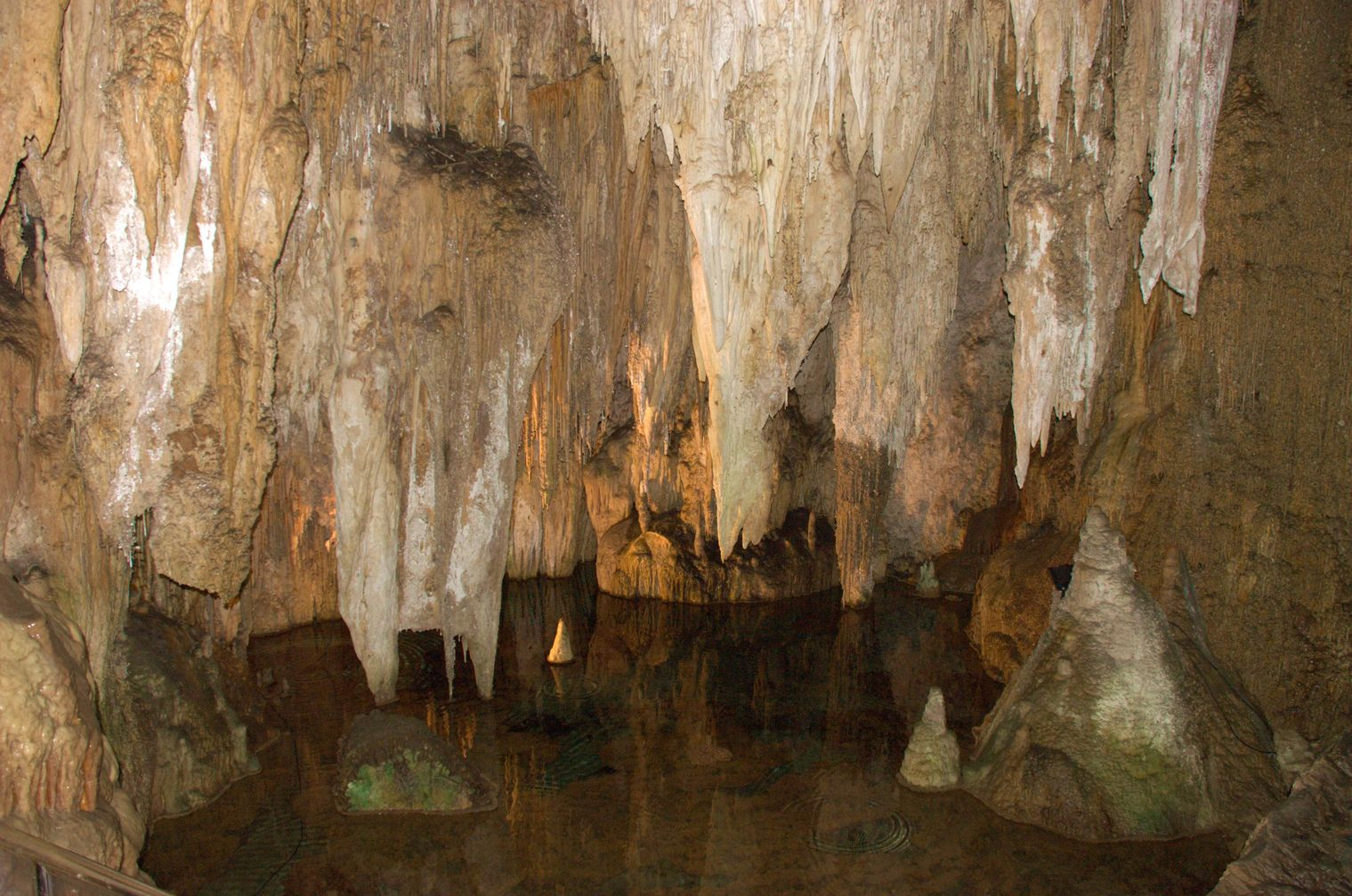
Furong Cave

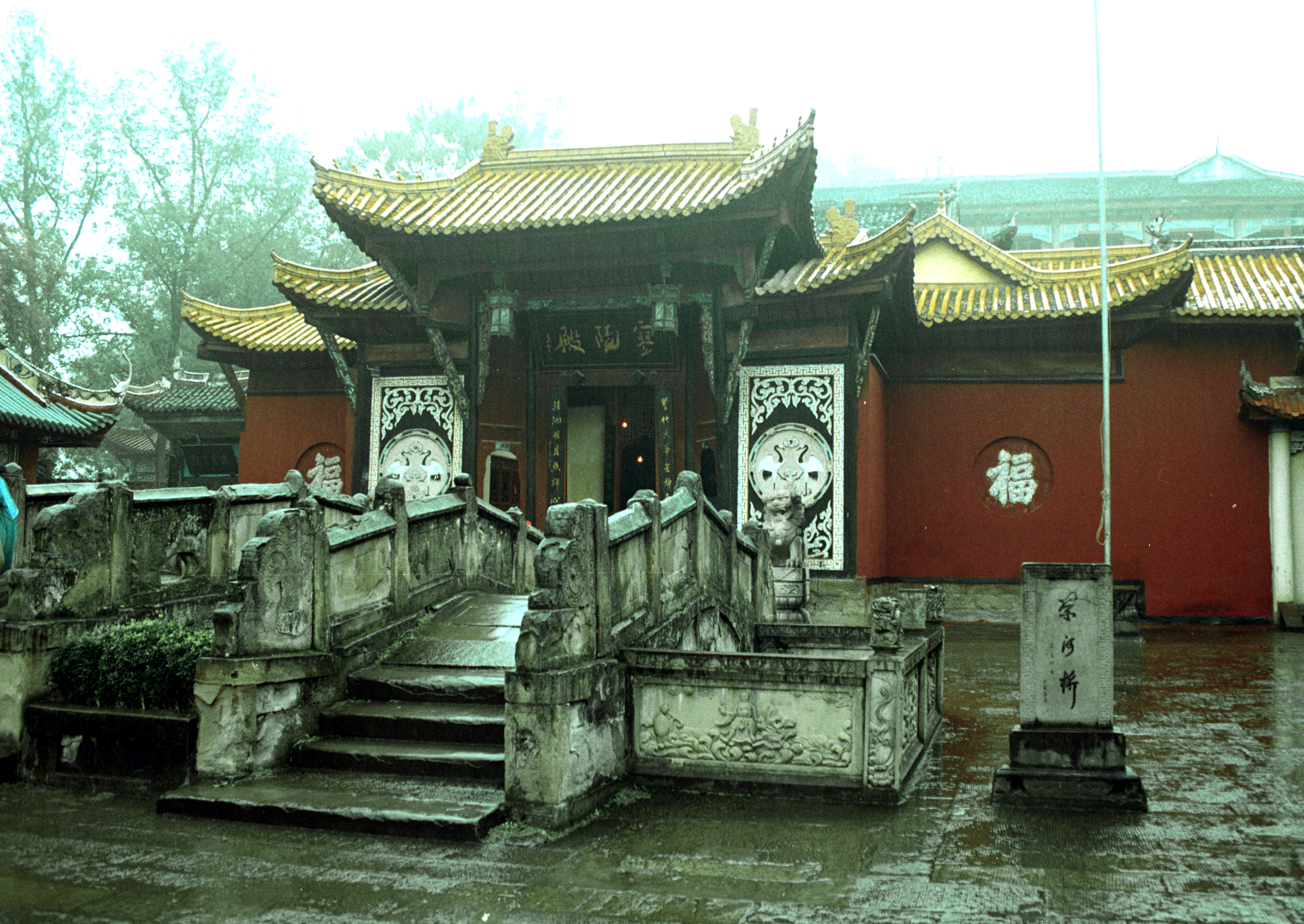
Fengdu Ghost City

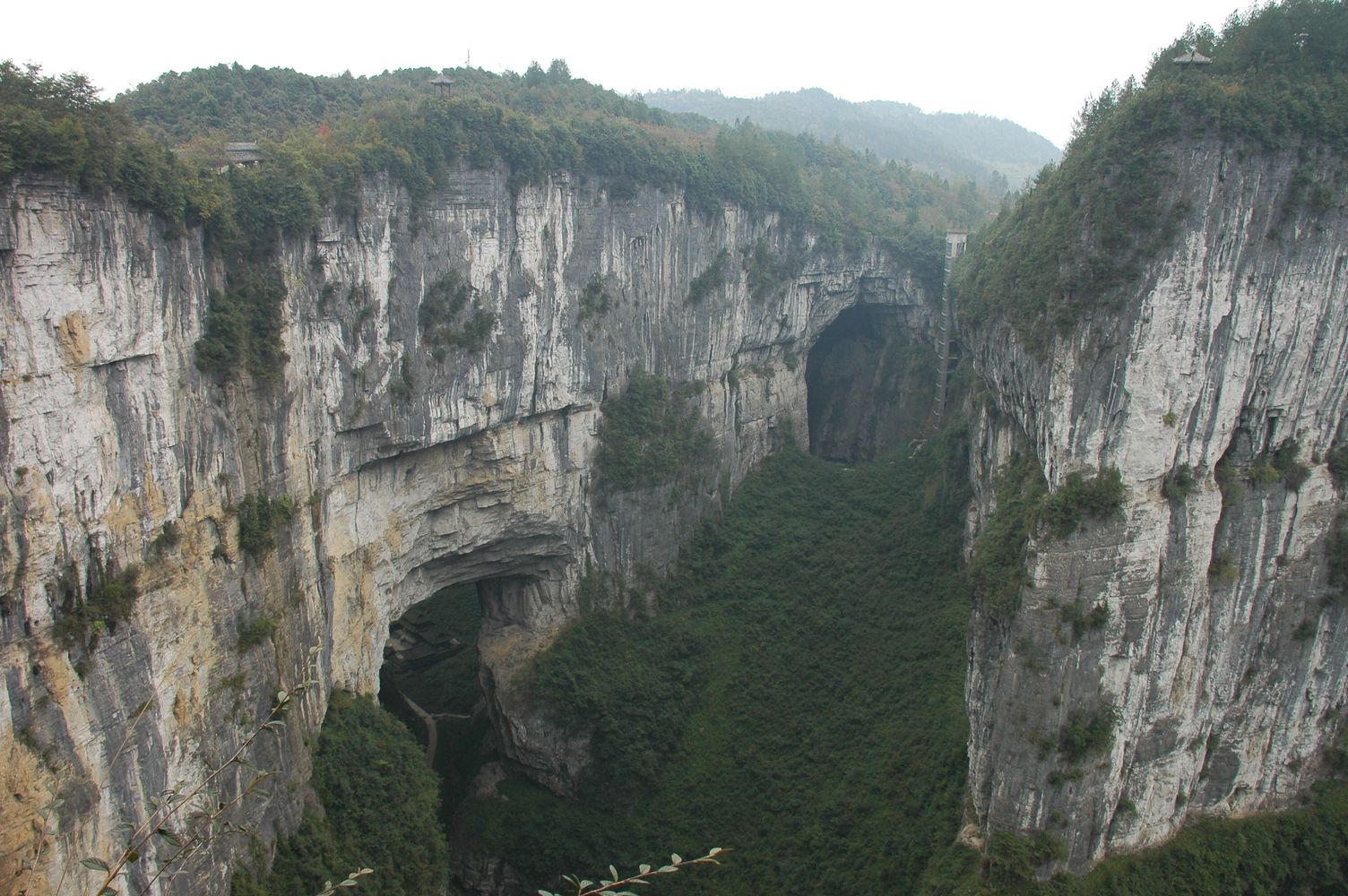
Three Natural Bridges

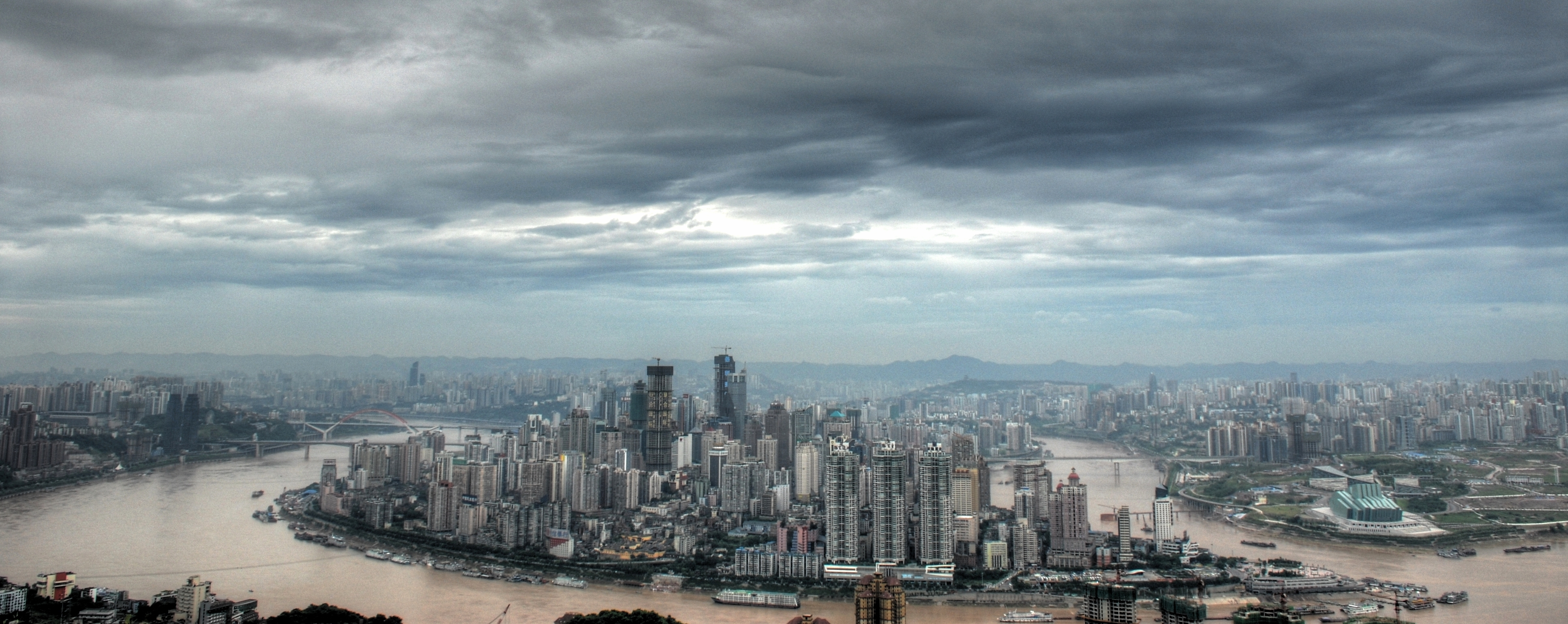
Chaotianmen in 2010

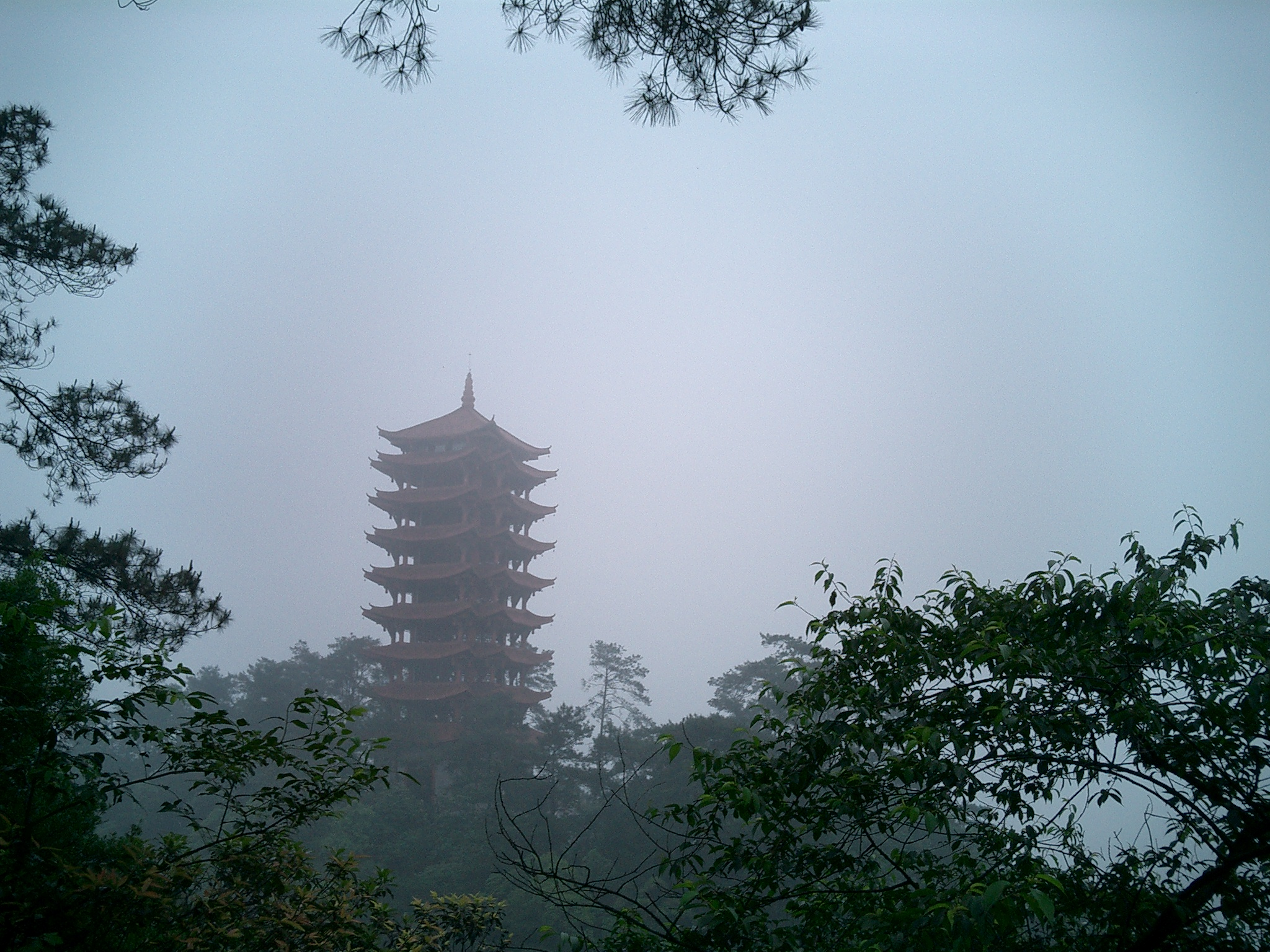
Jinyun Mountain

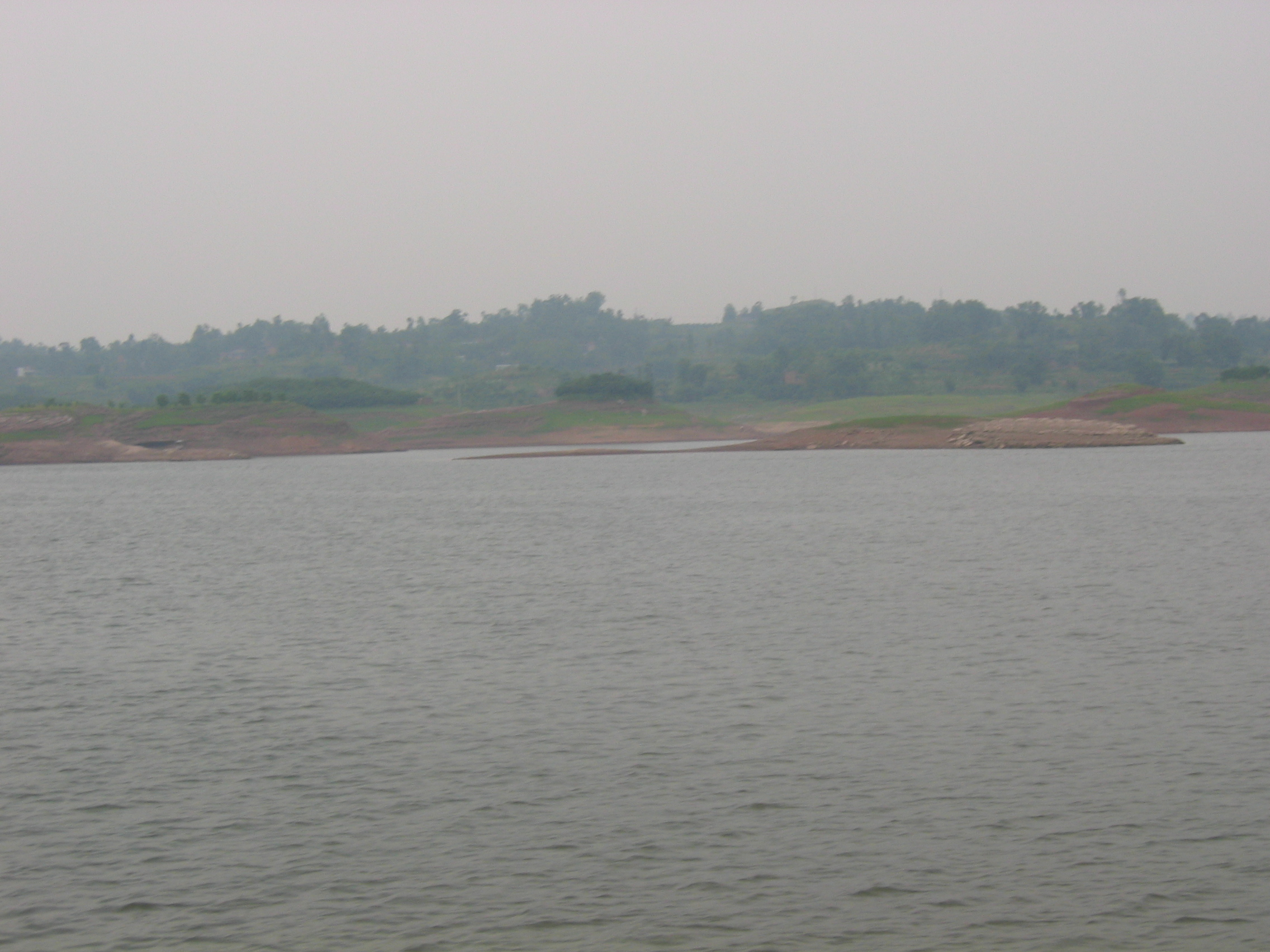
Changshou Lake

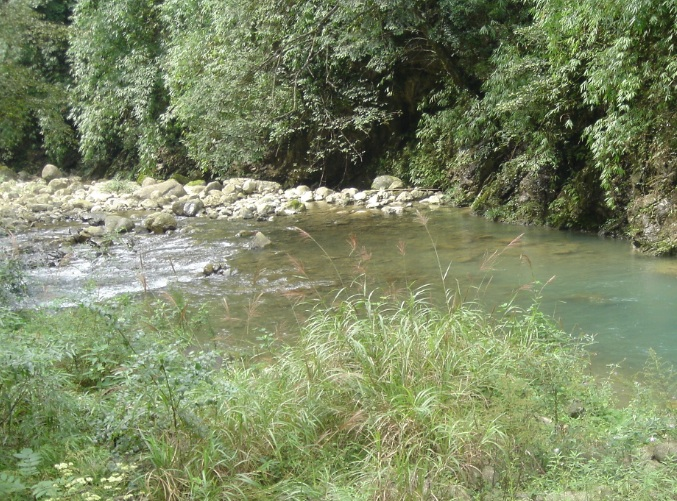
Black Mountain Valley
