= Nanbin Park =

Urban park in Chongqing, China

- Type: Urban park
- Location: Chongqing, China
- Area: 54.5 acres (22.1 ha)
- Created: 2005
- Operator: Chongqing Municipal
- Status: Open all year

Nanbin Park (Chinese: 南滨公园; lit. 'South Riverside Park'), also known as Chongqing Riverside Park, is a major belt-shaped urban park in Nan'an District of Chongqing. The park is made up by six continuous parks distributed along the Nanbin Road and Yangtze River. Each of six parks represents a notable landscape or urban legend. The six parks, listed from west to east, are:

- Huangge Wan Du (Chinese: 黄葛晚渡; lit. 'The night view at Huangge (ficus virens) Ferry')
- Haitang Yanyu (Chinese: 海棠烟雨; lit. 'The misty rain at Haitang (a type of flower) Creek')
- Zishui Xiaodeng (Chinese: 字水霄灯; lit. 'The Chinese-character-shaped river flowing pattern and the inverted image of lamps in Yangtze River')
- Xiajiang Kaibu(Chinese: 峡江开埠; lit. 'The Western power's port on the Yangtze River valley')
- Longmen Haoyue (Chinese: 龙门浩月; lit. 'The bright moon above Longmen (the Gate of Chinese Dragon)')
- Yuwang Yizong (Chinese: 禹王遗踪; lit. 'The relic of Yu the Great')

Each of these six parks is one of either old or new Twelve Views of Chongqing, which has become attractions for years. The Nanbin Park was created in 2005 to merge them into one single tourist attraction.
