= Single Tree Vista =

Park and tower in Chongqing, China

- Type: Urban park, Overlook
- Location: Chongqing, China
- Area: 20 acres (8.1 ha)
- Created: 1997 (the overlook park); 2003 (the overlook tower)
- Operator: Chongqing Municipal
- Status: Open all year

Single Tree Vista, also known as Yikeshu Vista or Yikeshu Overlook, is a popular overlook park and tower located in the Nan'an District of Chongqing in Southwest China. It is known as one of the best places to see a panorama of the urban area of central Chongqing, especially the skyline of Yuzhong District, Yangtze River, Jialing River as well as a night view of the city.

Next to the South Mountain Park, the overlook is set on halfway up of a mountain peak in southeastern edge of Chongqing. The elevation of the overlook is about 400 meters. The overlook tower itself is 28 meters tall, and it is able to hold about 500 people at once. Many China's national leaders, including Jiang Zemin, Hu Jintao, Qiao Shi, Li Changchun and He Guoqiang, have visited this overlook. During construction, an old huangjue tree (sometimes called huangge tree in local accent), Chongqing's tree of city, was preserved, and thus this overlook was named Yikeshu, which literally means Single Tree.
