= South Mountain Botanical Garden =

Botanical garden in Chongqing, China

- Interactive map of South Mountain Botanical Garden
- Type: Botanical garden, Urban park, Forest park
- Location: Chongqing, China
- Area: 117 hectares (290 acres)
- Created: 1959
- Operator: Chongqing Municipal
- Status: Open all year

South Mountain Botanical Garden (Chinese: 南山植物园) is the largest botanical garden in Chongqing. It is a major urban park of central Chongqing, and it is one of the 8 major civil projects of Chongqing Municipal.

It is located on Tongluo Mountain, an anticline range in southeastern edge of central Chongqing area.

== Gardens ==
The botanical garden is divided into many smaller gardens. Rose garden, camellia garden, plum blossom garden, orchis garden and the endangered species garden are the most popular ones.

A total of 1646 plant species are raised in the garden, most of which are subtropical low mountain species.

Triassic and Jurassic sedimentary rocks and geological structures are distributed throughout the garden.

== Great Golden Eagle ==
The Great Golden Eagle, a gold-colored cement eagle statue of more than 50 meters tall, is set in this garden. It is one of Chongqing's landmarks, and is used as a navigation mark by some airlines flying to Chongqing Jiangbei International Airport.
