= Pipa Mountain Park =

Urban park in Chongqing, China

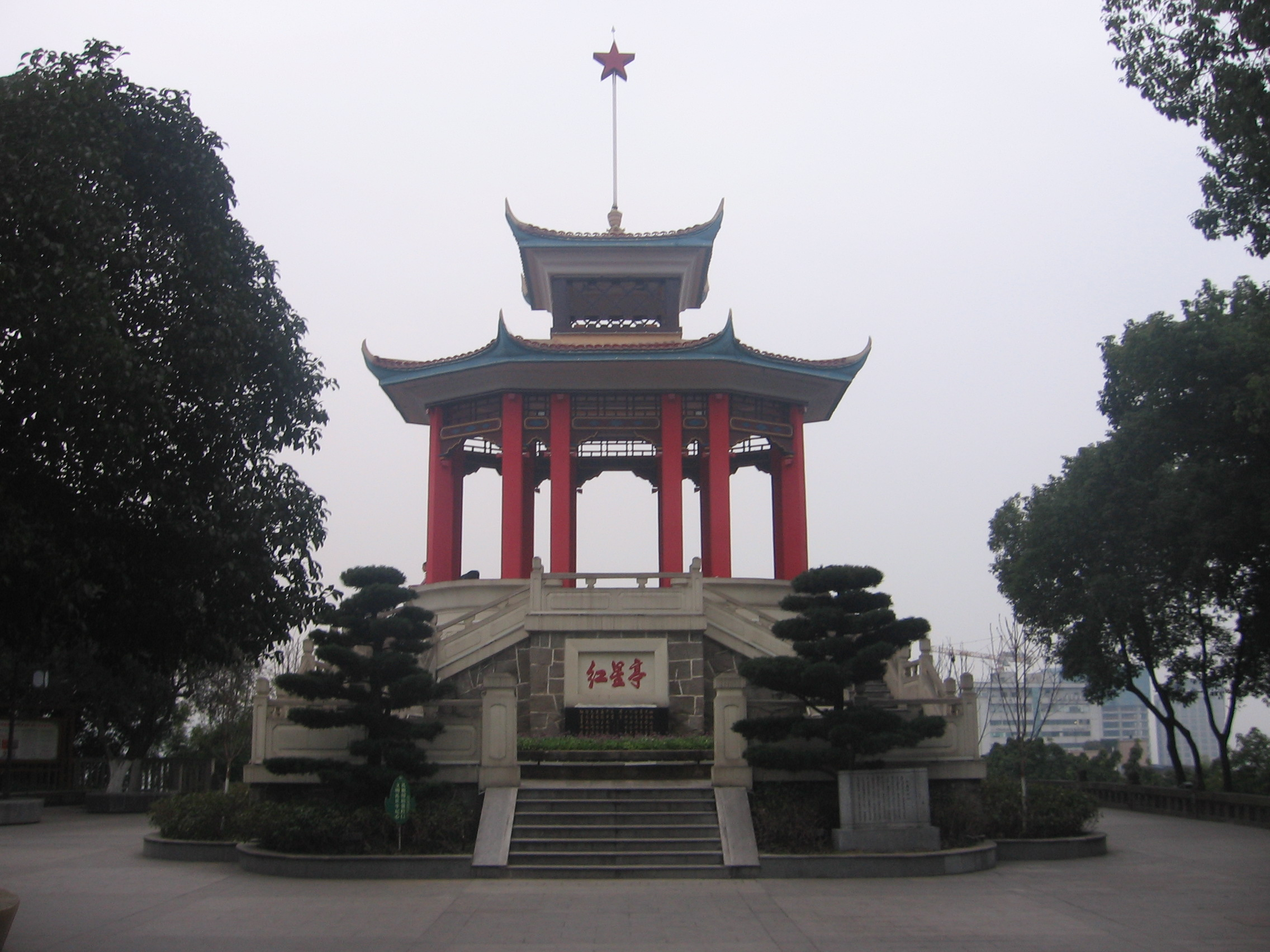
- Interactive map of Pipa Mountain Park
- Type: Urban park
- Location: Chongqing, China
- Coordinates: 29°33′24″N 106°33′15″E
- Created: 1955
- Status: Open all year

Pipa Mountain Park (also known as Pipashan Park, Chinese: 枇杷山公园; lit. 'Loquat Mountain Park') is a major urban park in the city of Chongqing. With an elevation of 345 meters, this park is the highest point of the Yuzhong District of Chongqing. The park used to be a private garden to Wang Lingji, the former KMT governor of Sichuan Province during Republic of China period. In 1955, the garden started to open to public as an urban park. On the top of Pipa Mountain, there is a tall pagoda called Twin River Pagoda, with views of Yangtze River to the south and Jialing River to the north. In 2009, the park expanded from 5 hectares to 11.89 hectares.
