= Shibaozhai =

Hill in Chongqing, China

Coordinates: 30°25′19″N 108°11′02″E

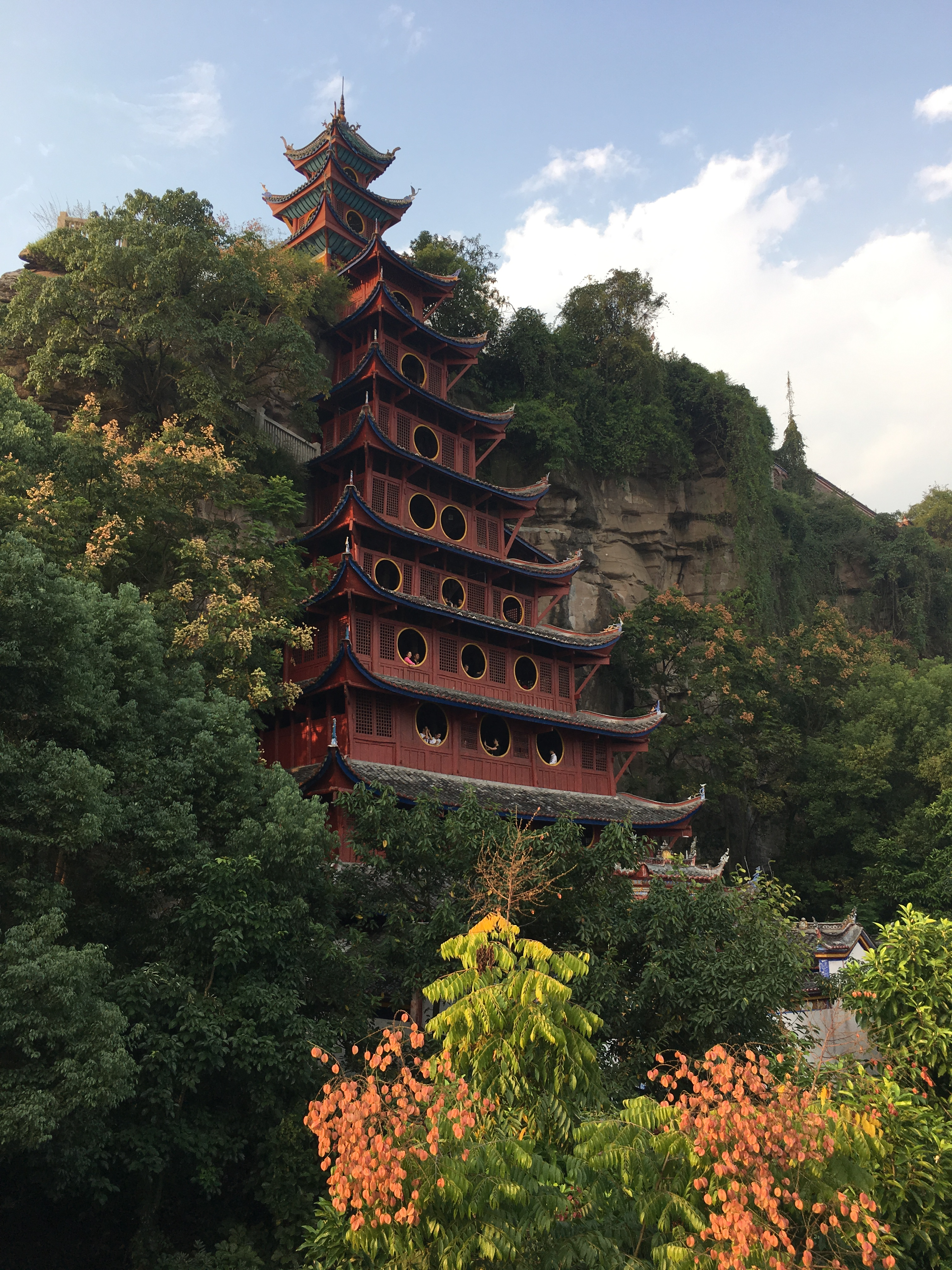
Red pavilion of Shibaozhai

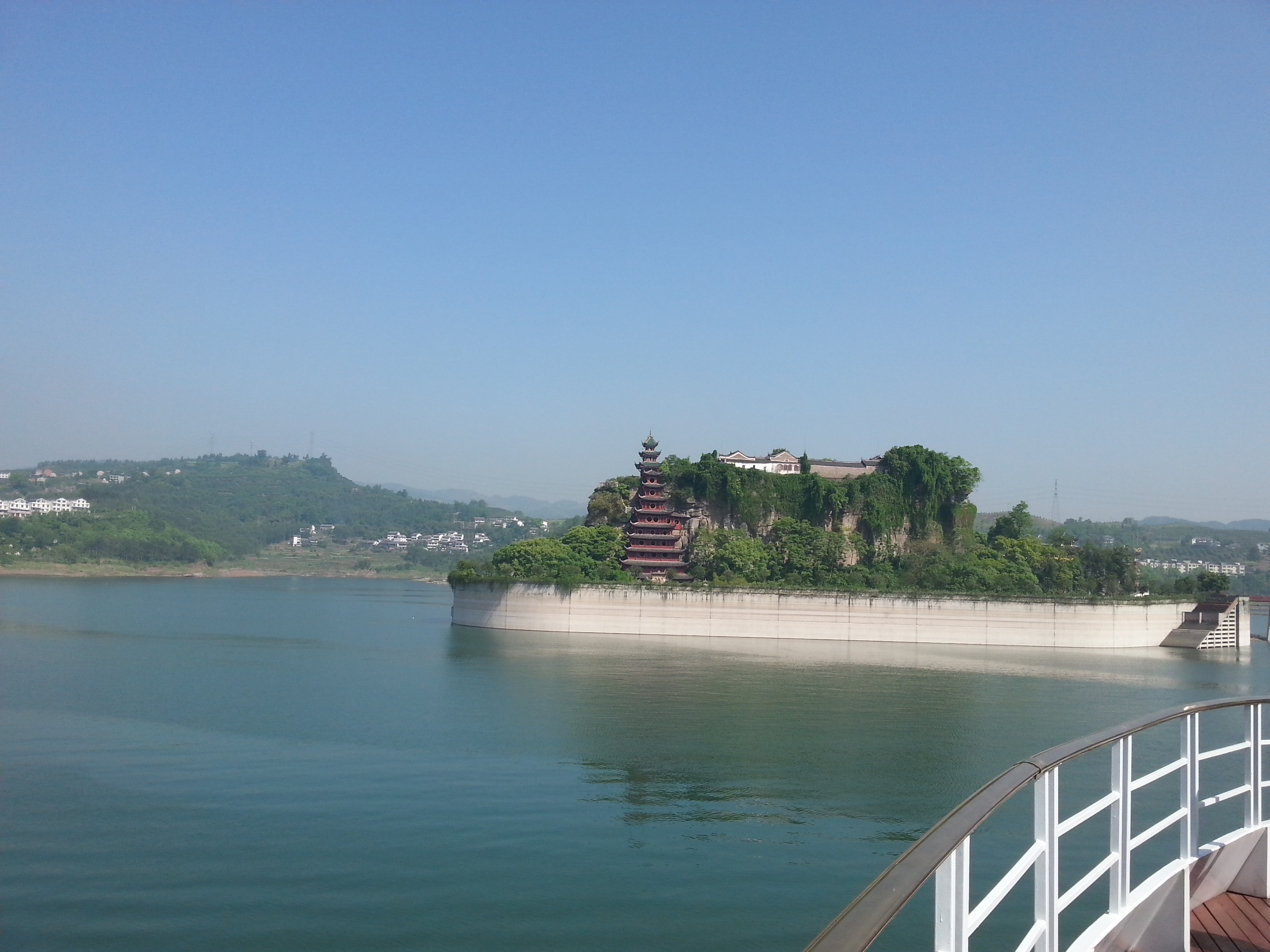
View of Shibaozhai from Yangtze River Cruise

Shibaozhai (simplified Chinese: 石宝寨; traditional Chinese: 石寶寨; pinyin: shí bǎo zhài; lit. 'Precious Stone Fortress') is a hill along the bank of the Yangtze River (Chang Jiang) in Zhong County, Chongqing, China. This rocky and craggy hill has extremely steep sides and is about 200 meters (660 feet) tall. On the river side is a red pavilion which leans against the side of the hill providing a walkway to the temple at the top. The red pavilion built against the rock face is one of the largest wooden temples with nine floors. A yellow entrance at the base of the pavilion provides access.

== History ==
At the top of Shibaozhai is a three-storied hall dedicated to Manjusri built during the reign of the Xianfeng Emperor (1850–1861), called the Purple Rain Pavilion. In the year 1819, the nine-story pavilion was constructed adjacent to the cliff to aid people in getting to the top of the hill. Prior to the construction of the pavilion, visitors to the temple were hoisted to the top using a system of chains. In 1956, three more stories were added at the top of the structure. On the top of the pagoda is a Buddhist temple.

== Current ==
At the base of the hill alongside the river bank is a row of merchant stalls which follows the path from the dock to the entrance of the pavilion.

Many river cruise boats dock at Shibaozhai for a few hours to allow passengers to tour the pavilion and temple.

With the construction of the Three Gorges Dam the base of the red pavilion would have been beneath the reservoir's water level in earlier designs.
