= South Mountain Park (Chongqing) =

Park in Chongqing, China

- Type: Urban park, Forest Park
- Location: Chongqing, China
- Area: 2500 hectares
- Operator: Chongqing Municipal
- Status: Open all year

South Mountain Park (Nanshan Park) is a large suburban park in Nan'an District of Chongqing. It is located on the Nanshan (South Mountain), which is a part of the Tongluo Mountain (a branch of Huaying Mountain). The mountain itself is a huge anticline with two concaves on the top, and it is also a part of the basin and range province of eastern Sichuan. The highest elevation of South Mountain is 681 meters, and the average elevation of peaks is around 400 meters. Karst landforms and deep river valleys are widely distributed in the mountain.

The park is composed by many smaller pieces, among which the Wenfeng Pagoda, the Golden Eagle Statue and the residences of George Catlett Marshall and Chiang Kai-shek during World War II are best known. The legendary home of Tushan Shi, the wife of Yu the Great, and his son Qi, who established Xia dynasty, is also in the park. There are also many Buddhist and Taoist temples in this park, and many of them were constructed during Tang dynasty (618–907) and Song dynasty (960–1279). The park is also the water source of several rivers in Chongqing, such as Haitang Creek, Huaxi River and Jiantan River.
