= List of bridges in Chongqing =

This is a list of bridges in Chongqing, China.

== Bridges ==
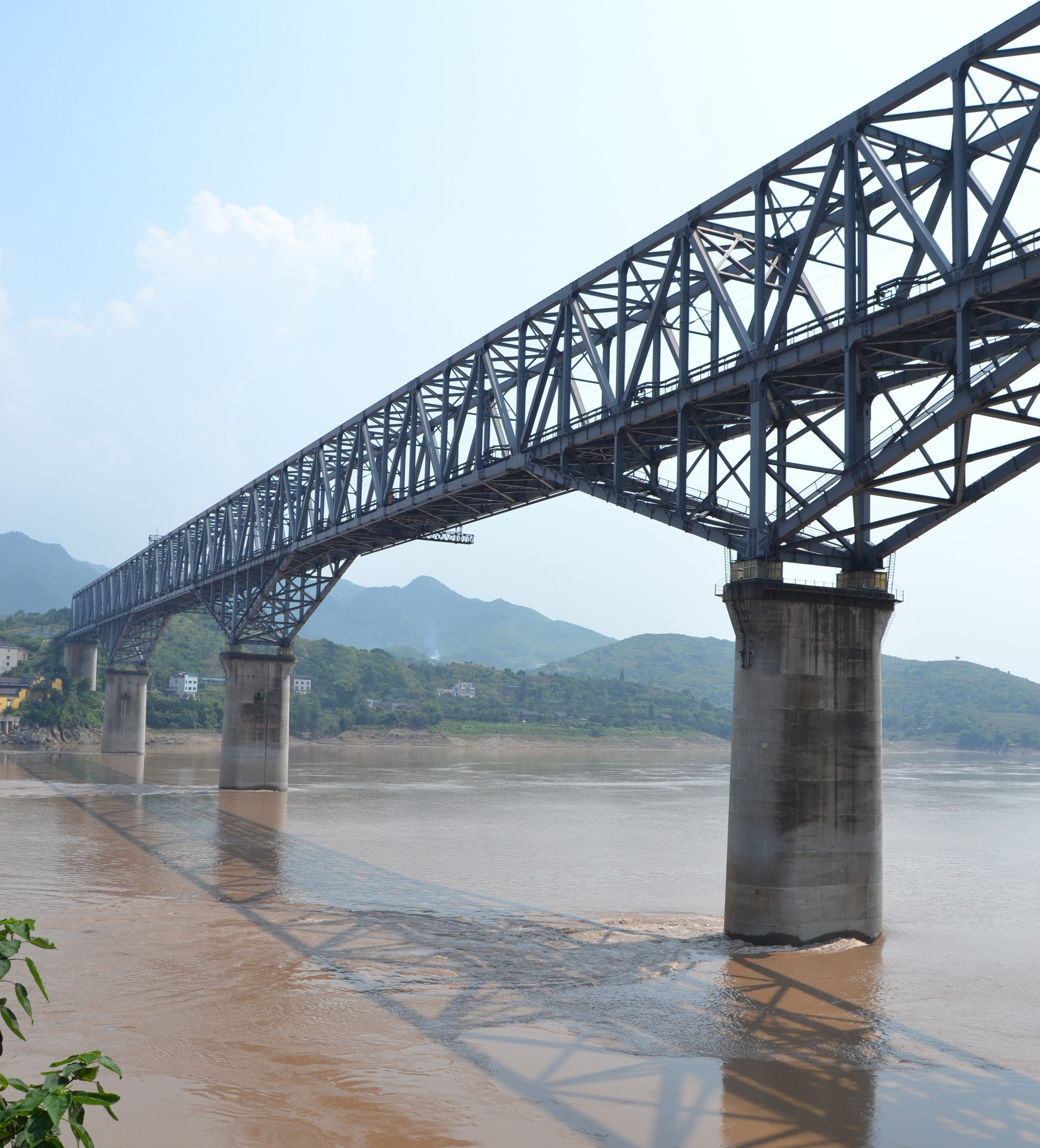
The Changshou Railway Bridge.

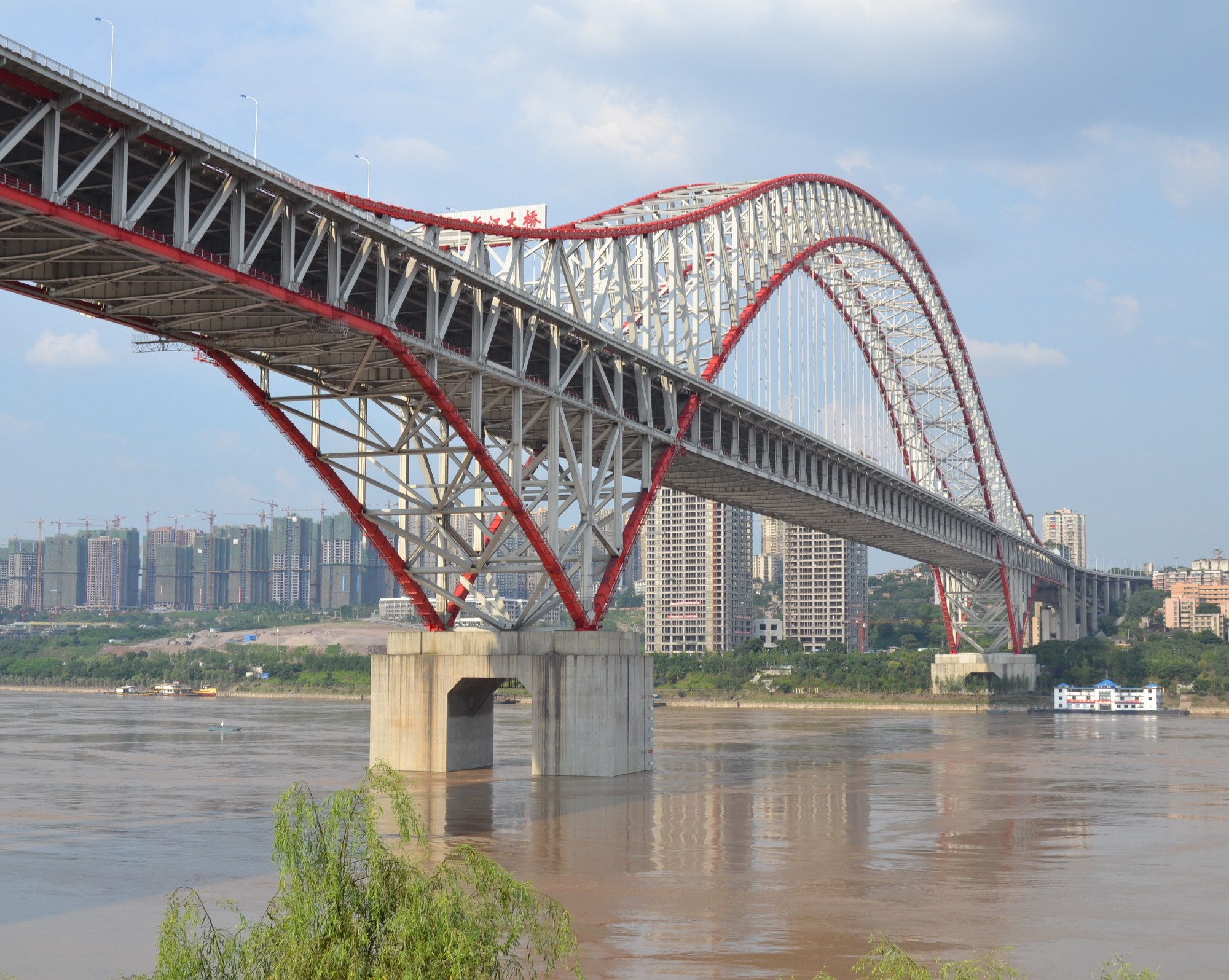
The Chaotianmen Bridge.

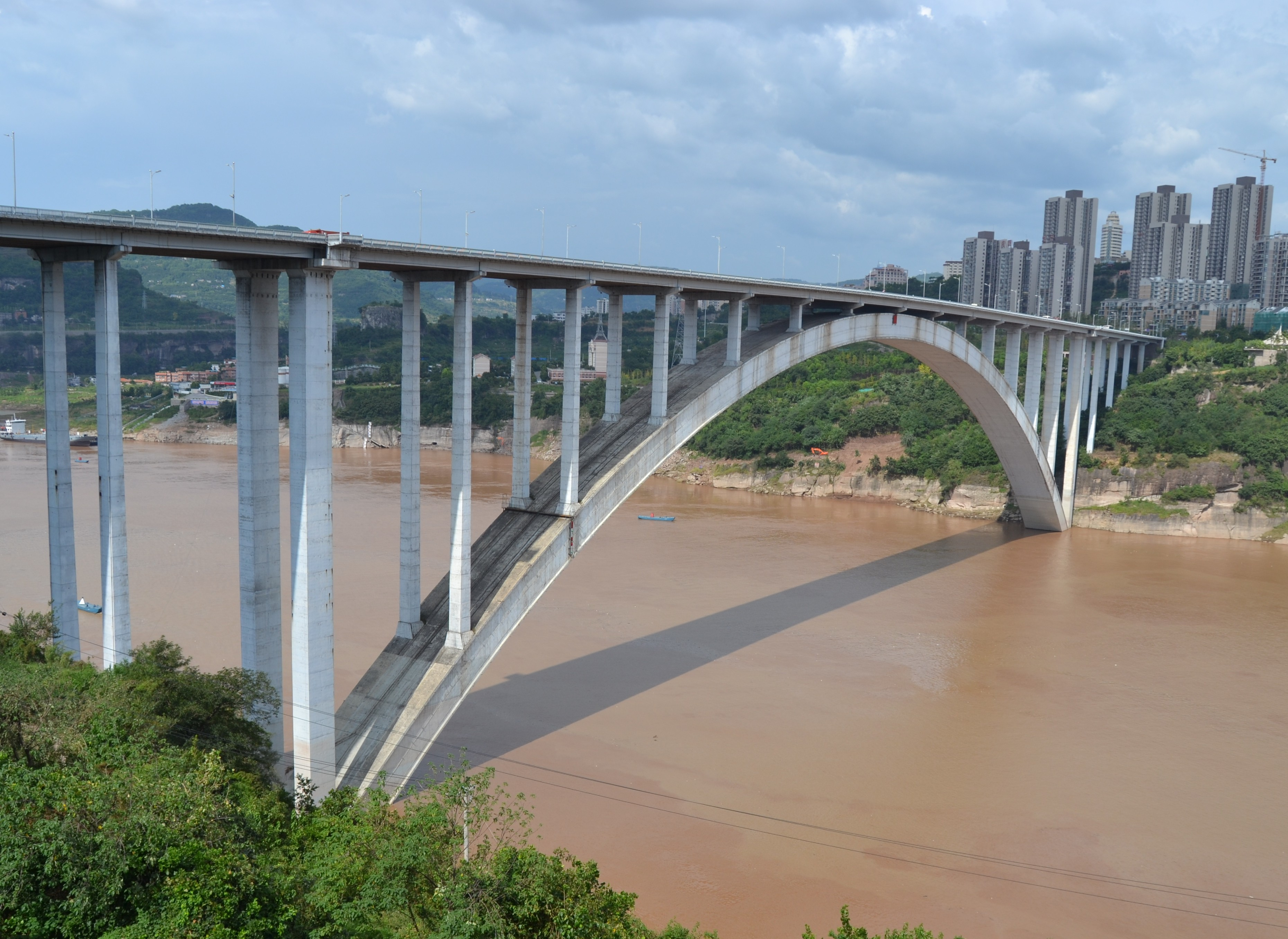
The Wanxian Bridge.

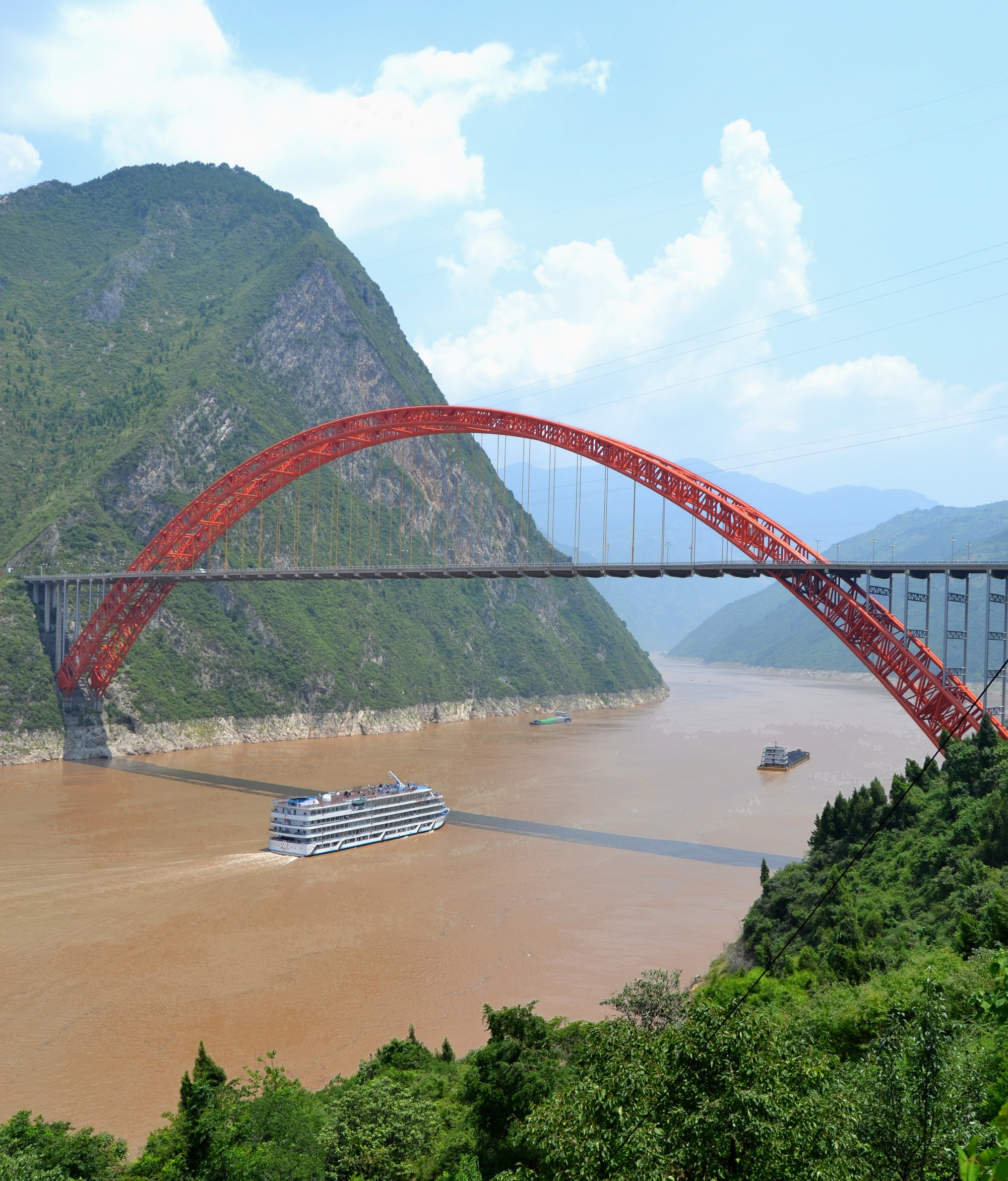
The Wushan Yangtze River Bridge.

- Baishatuo Railway Bridge
- Beidong Bridge
- Caiyuanba Bridge
- Changshou Bridge
- Changshou Railway Bridge
- Chaotianmen Bridge
- Chaoyang Arch Bridge
- Dafosi Bridge
- Daning River Bridge
- Dingshan Bridge
- Dragon’s Gate bridge
- Diwei Bridge
- Dongshuimen Bridge
- Dongyang Bridge
- Egongyan Bridge
- Fengdu Bridge
- Fengjie Bridge
- Fuling Arch Bridge
- Fuling Wujiang Bridge
- Fuling Yangtze River Bridge
- Furongjiang River Bridge
- Guangyangdao Bridge
- Guanyinyan Bridge
- Hanjiatuo Bridge
- Hechuan Jialingjiang Bridge
- Huanghuayuan Bridge
- Jia Yue Bridge
- Jiangjin Bridge
- Jiahua Bridge
- Lidu Bridge
- Lijiatuo Bridge
- Masangxi Bridge
- Meixi River Bridge
- Meixi River Expressway Bridge
- New Dragon’s Gate bridge
- Qianximen Bridge
- Shibangou Bridge
- Second Wanxian Bridge
- Shibanpo Bridge
- Shimen Bridge
- Shuitu Bridge
- Taichang Bridge
- Wanxian Bridge
- Wanzhou Railway Bridge
- Wulingshan Bridge
- Wushan Yangtze River Bridge
- Xisha Bridge
- Yangjialing Bridge
- Yingbin Yangtze River Bridge under construction
- Yongchuan Bridge
- Yudong Bridge
- Yunyang Yangtze River Bridge
- Yuzui Yangtze River Bridge
- Zhongxian Huyu Expressway Bridge
- Zhongxian Yangtze River Bridge

== See also ==
- List of bridges in China
- Yangtze River bridges and tunnels
