= Meixi River Expressway Bridge =

Meixi River Expressway Bridge 梅溪河大桥
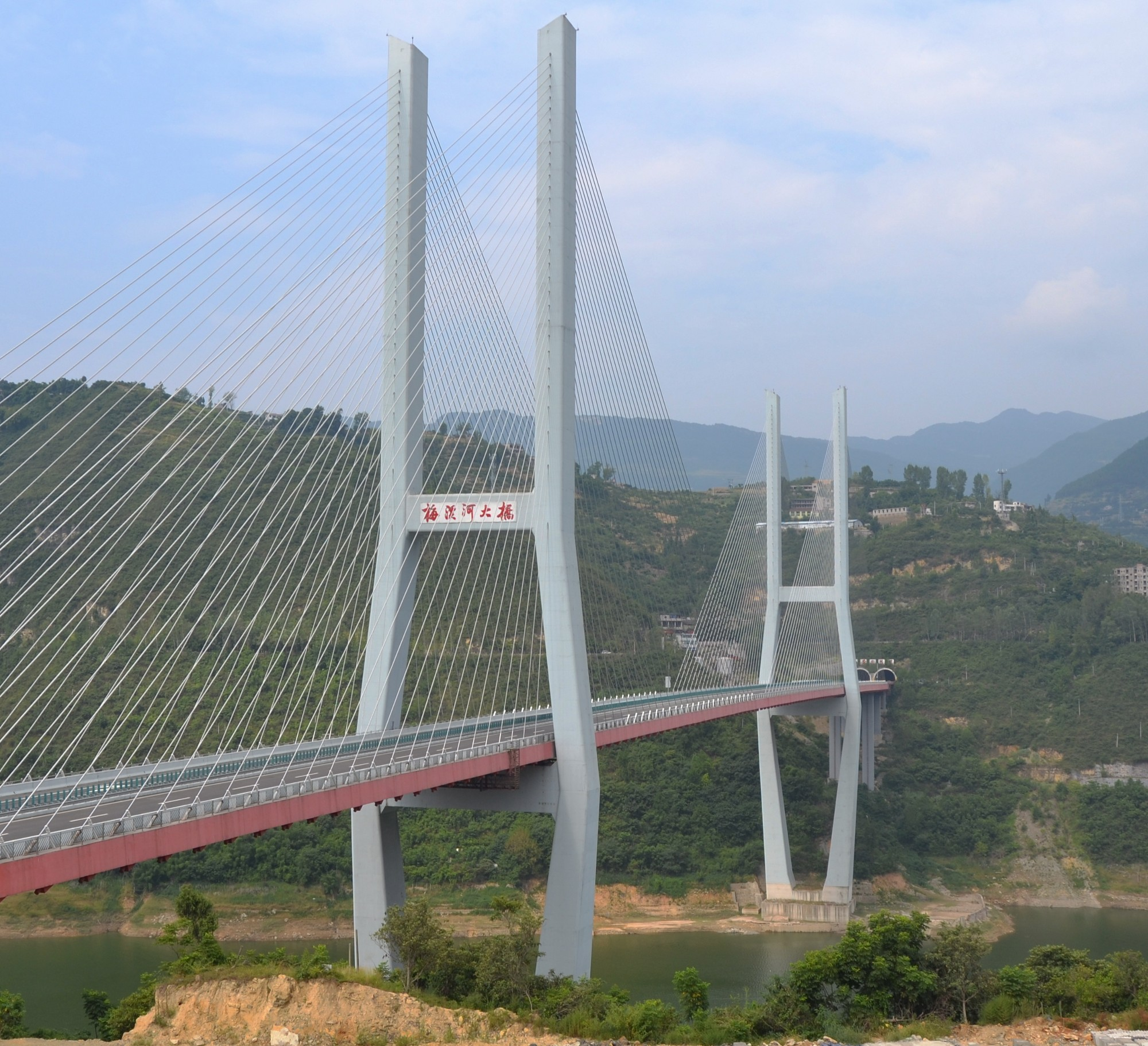
- Coordinates: 31.070833°N 109.504528°E
- Carries: G42 Hurong Expressway
- Crosses: Meixi River
- Locale: Fengjie, Chongqing, China

Characteristics
- Design: Cable-stayed
- Material: Steel/concrete
- Total length: 821 metres (2,694 ft)
- Height: 193 metres (633 ft)
- Longest span: 386 metres (1,266 ft)
- Clearance above: 145 metres (476 ft)

History
- Opened: 2010

Location
- Interactive map of Meixi River Expressway Bridge

The Meixi River Expressway Bridge is a cable-stayed bridge near Fengjie, Chongqing, China. The bridge opened in 2010 carrying traffic on the G42 Shanghai–Chengdu Expressway across and spans 386 metres (1,266 ft) across the Meixi River. The bridge sits 145 metres (476 ft) above the original river level but the construction of the Three Gorges Dam has increased the height of the water below the bridge and the full clearance is no longer visible.

== See also ==
- Meixi River Bridge
- List of tallest bridges in the world
