= Meixi River Bridge =

Meixi River Bridge 梅溪河大桥
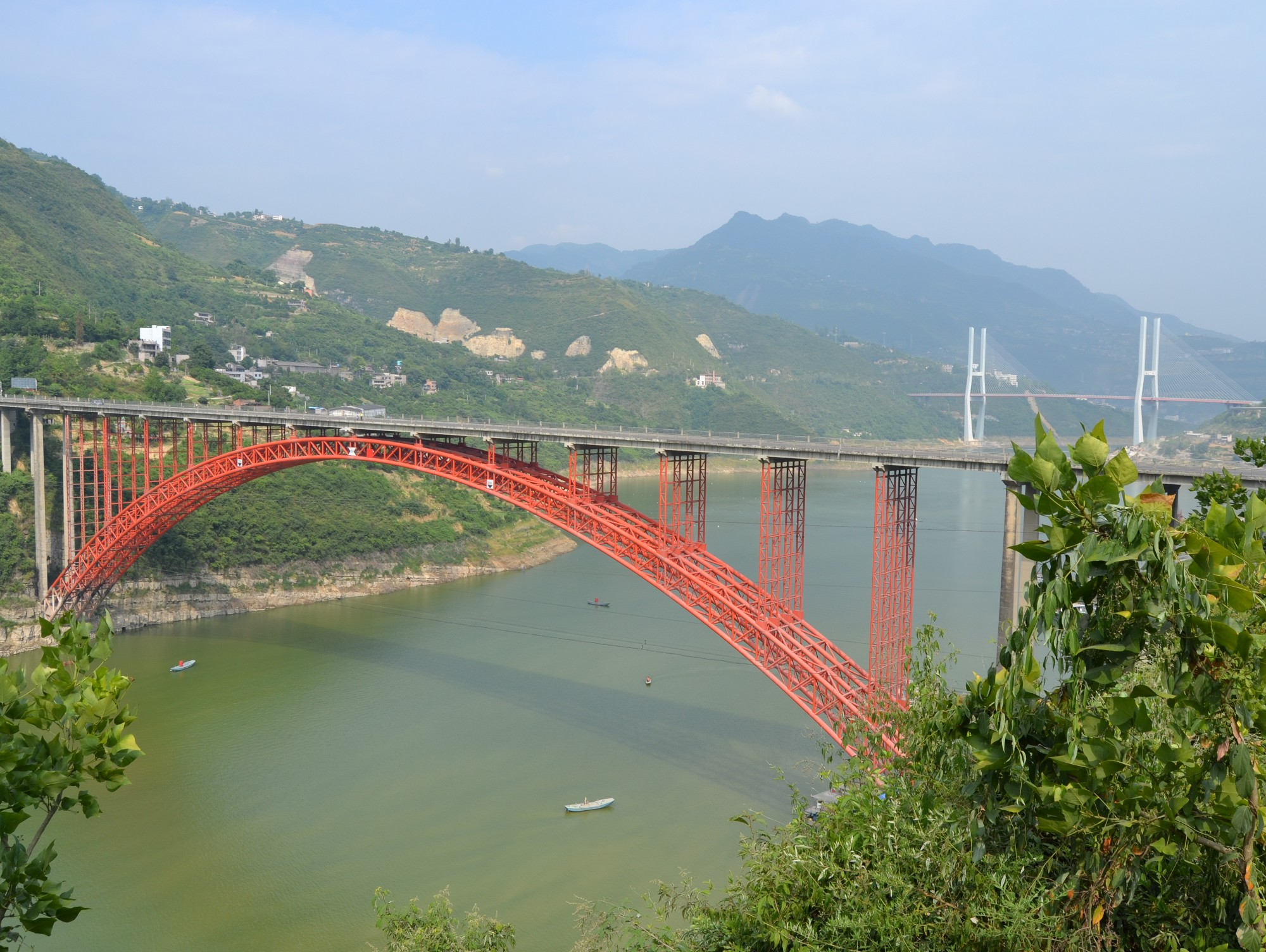
- Coordinates: 31.061167°N 109.518278°E
- Crosses: Meixi River
- Locale: Fengjie, Chongqing, China

Characteristics
- Design: Arch Bridge
- Material: Steel
- Total length: 491 metres (1,611 ft)
- Longest span: 288 metres (945 ft)
- Clearance above: 140 metres (460 ft)

History
- Opened: 2000

Location
- Interactive map of Meixi River Bridge

The Meixi River Bridge is an arch bridge which crosses the Meixi River in Fengjie, Chongqing, China. It replaced an earlier suspension bridge across the river built in 1990. Completed in 2000, The bridge was constructed 140 metres (460 ft) above the river however the reservoir created by the construction of the Three Gorges Dam has increased the height of the water below the bridge and the full clearance is no longer visible. The bridge spans 288 metres (945 ft) ranking among the longest arch bridges in the world. The bridge is located very near the end of the river and can be seen by boats travelling along the Yangtze River.

== See also ==
- List of longest arch bridge spans
- Meixi River Expressway Bridge
