= Zhang Fei Temple =

Coordinates: 30°54′44″N 108°41′57″E

The Zhang Fei Temple was a temple site in China. It sat on the hillside across the Yangtze River from Yunyang County in Chongqing until inundated by the Three Gorges Dam in 2006.

The temple was built in honor of General Zhang Fei, a 3rd-century military leader of the Three Kingdoms period. According to legend, the gold used to finance the construction of the temple was fished out of the river along with the severed head of the general, who had been killed by two of his underlings.

During the 17 centuries of the temple's lifetime, successive dynasties and emperors added extensions to it. The compound included an enormous hall with a colossal statue of Zhang Fei, a tower named the Jieyi Tower, and pavilions to honor the poet Du Fu, who lived in the temple for two years.

The construction of the Three Gorges Dam flooded the temple site. Many of its monuments were however saved beforehand, including the statue of Zhang Fei and the ornate front gates.
