= Taihe Tujia Ethnic Township =

Taihe Tujia Ethnic Township 太和土家族乡
- Ethnic township
- Location in Chongqing
- Coordinates: 30°37′22″N 109°15′1″E
- Country: People's Republic of China
- Direct-administered municipality: Chongqing
- County: Fengjie County
- Time zone: UTC+8 (China Standard)

Taihe Tujia Ethnic Township (simplified Chinese: 太和土家族乡; traditional Chinese: 太和土家族鄉; pinyin: Tàihé Tǔjiā Zú Xiāng) is an ethnic township for Tujia people that is under the administration of Fengjie County, Chongqing, China. As of 2020, it administers Taihe Residential Community and the following seven villages:

- Taiping Village (太平村)
- Gaoqiao Village (高桥村)
- Jianshan Village (尖山村)
- Liangjia Village (良家村)
- Shiban Village (石板村)
- Shipan Village (石盘村)
- Jinzi Village (金子村)

== See also ==
- List of township-level divisions of Chongqing
