= Dashu, Chongqing =

Dashu 大树镇
- Town
- Location in Chongqing
- Coordinates: 31°12′38″N 109°19′17″E
- Country: People's Republic of China
- Direct-administered municipality: Chongqing
- County: Fengjie County
- Time zone: UTC+8 (China Standard)

Dashu (simplified Chinese: 大树; traditional Chinese: 大樹; pinyin: Dàshù) is a town under the administration of Fengjie County, Chongqing, China. As of 2018, it has two residential communities and 14 villages under its administration.

== See also ==
- List of township-level divisions of Chongqing
