= Wanzhou Yangtze River Bridge =

Wanxian Yangtze River Bridge 万州长江大桥
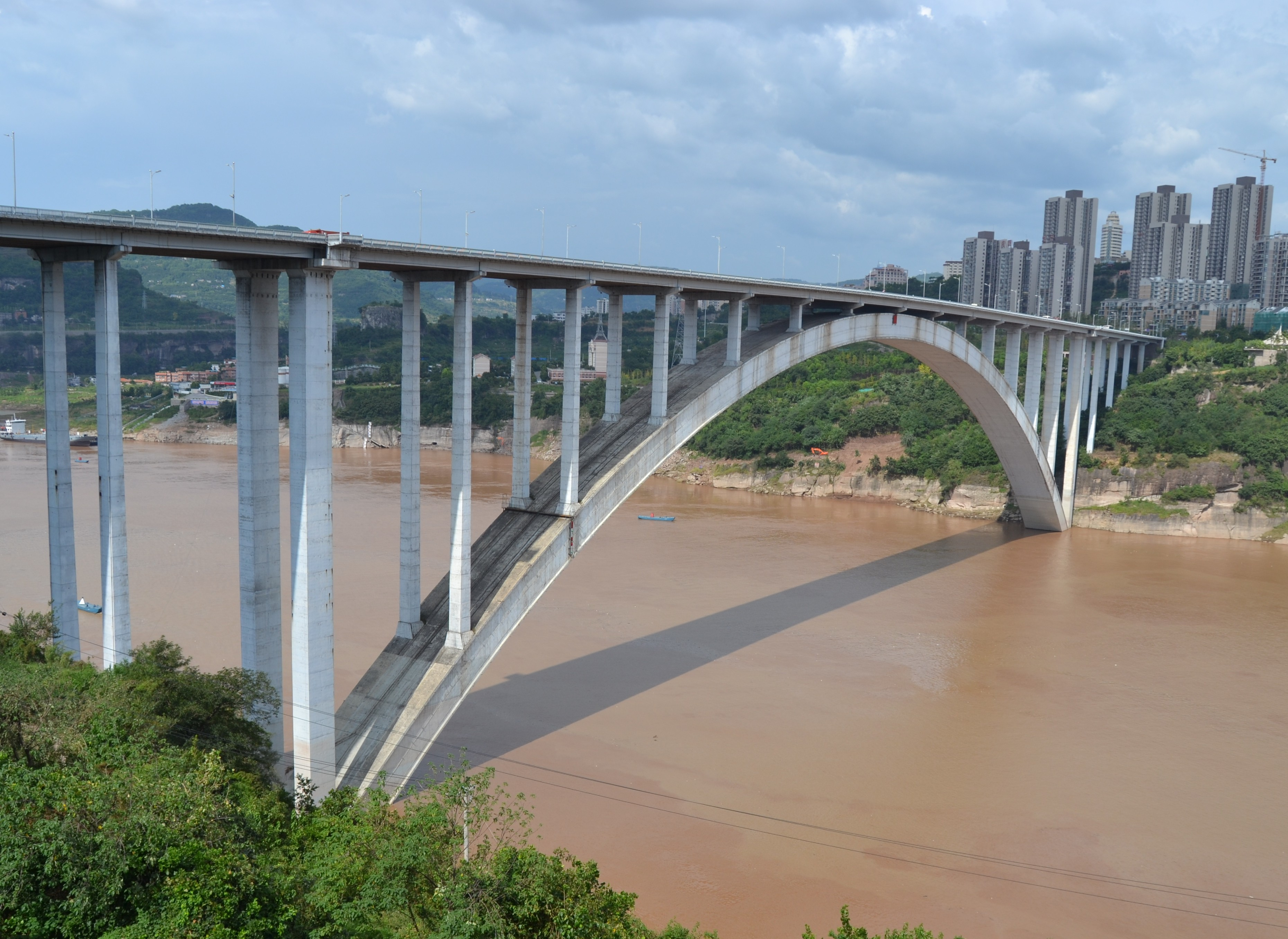
- Coordinates: 30.759611°N 108.419278°E
- Carries: China National Highway 318
- Crosses: Yangtze River
- Locale: Wanzhou, Chongqing, China

Characteristics
- Design: CFST Skeleton Arch
- Material: Concrete
- Total length: 864 metres (2,835 ft)
- Longest span: 420 metres (1,380 ft)
- Clearance above: 133 metres (436 ft)

History
- Opened: 1997

Location
- Interactive map of Wanxian Yangtze River Bridge

The Wanzhou Yangtze River Bridge (Chinese: 万州长江大桥), originally called the Wanxian Yangtze River Bridge (simplified Chinese: 万县长江大桥; traditional Chinese: 萬縣長江大橋; pinyin: Wànxiàn Chángjiāng Dàqiáo), is a reinforced concrete arch bridge built over the Yangtze River in 1997. It is located in the vicinity of the Three Gorges Dam in Wanzhou, Chongqing, China. The arch span is 420 metres (1,380 ft) and the total length of the bridge is 864.12 metres (2,835.0 ft). The clearance height to the river below is 133 metres (436 ft) however the full clearance is no longer visible as the reservoir created by the construction of the Three Gorges Dam has increased the height of the water. During the bridge construction, a concrete-filled tubular arch truss frame was built to support the weight of the concrete arch and embedded into the concrete arch.

The Wanxian Bridge is the longest existing concrete arch bridge in the world, displacing the previous record holder, the Croatian Krk Bridge. It is a major highway bridge with lanes for vehicles and pedestrians.

== See also ==
- Bridges and tunnels across the Yangtze River
- List of bridges in China
- List of longest arch bridge spans
- List of highest bridges
