= Yunyang County =

Coordinates: 30.9736°N 108.698°E

Yunyang 云阳县
- County
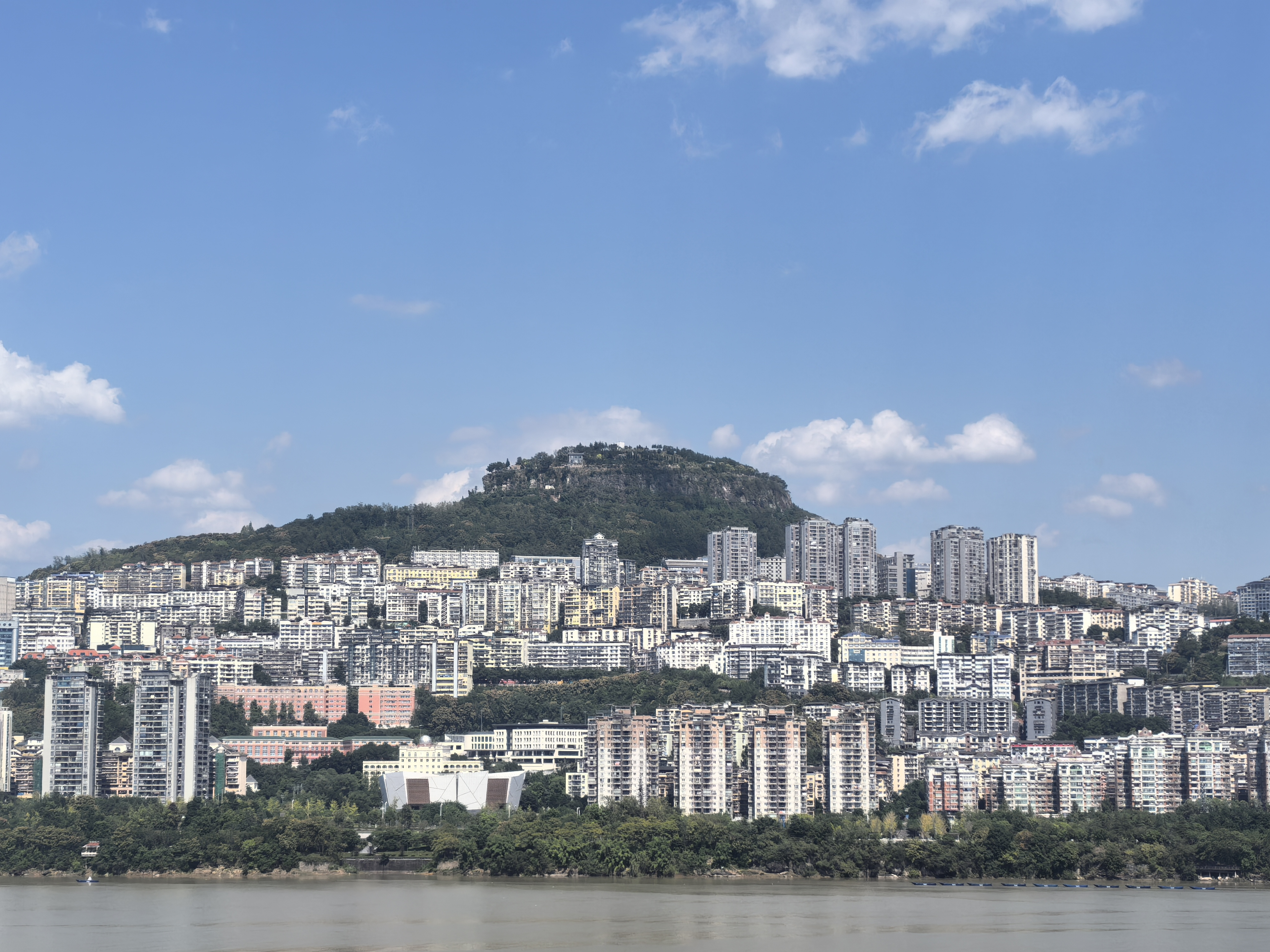
- Yunyang skyline

- Location of Yunyang County in Chongqing
- Country: People's Republic of China
- Municipality: Chongqing

Area
  - Total: 3,634 km^{2} (1,403 sq mi)

Population (2010)
  - Total: 912,900
  - Density: 251.2/km^{2} (650.6/sq mi)
- Time zone: UTC+8 (China Standard)

Yunyang County (simplified Chinese: 云阳县; traditional Chinese: 雲陽縣; pinyin: Yúnyáng Xiàn) is a county in the northeast of Chongqing Municipality, China, bordering Hubei province to the south.

Yunyang County, located in eastern Chongqing, has a history spanning over 1,400 years. The county features a variety of natural landscapes, including mountains, rivers, valleys, and caves, as well as cultural heritage associated with the ancient Ba state, local salt production, and the resettlement of residents from the Three Gorges region. Among its notable historical sites is the Zhang Fei Temple, established in memory of the Three Kingdoms period general Zhang Fei (220–280). The temple complex, which dates back more than 1,700 years, is a recognized cultural heritage site along the Yangtze River and serves as a major destination for regional river cruise tourism.

Because of the Three Gorges Dam Project, territories of Yunyang County have been submerged. The whole county and its local people have moved to the new county of Yunyang. Located at Shuangjiang Town on the northern bank of the Yangtze River, the new county is 162 miles from the Three Gorges Dam and 223 miles from Chongqing City. It is the county that has moved the longest distance among the migrating counties and cities during the Three Gorges Project.

Together with the people, Zhang Fei Temple, which is the hot scenic spot here has also been moved to Panshi Town which is opposite the New Town of Yunyang.

After years of construction, Yunyang has developed quickly and now has over 150 thousand local residences. The museum presenting the culture of the Migrants from the Three Gorges area has been built.

== History ==
In 314 BC, Juren County (朐忍县) was established in Qin state. In 568 AD, the county seat was moved to the site of modern Yunyang Town, and the county was renamed Yun'an (云安县). In 1283, the county was replaced by Yunyang Prefecture (云阳州). In 1373, the prefecture was downgraded to a county. In 1999, the county seat was moved from the now-submerged Yunyang Town to Shuangjiang Town (双江镇).

== Industrial Zone ==
Hong Shan Chuan Industry Ltd.

== Transportation ==
Yunyang has one Yangtze River crossing, the Yunyang Yangtze River Bridge.

== Education ==
As of 2015 the county has 138 schools. In 2005 there were 482 schools. In a ten-year period the number of students in the county declined by 42,000.

As of 2015 there are seven schools in Jianquan Township (建全乡). Sixin Village School and one other school both have one student each; the teacher at Sixin Village (四新村) School that year was Xiang Guozheng (向国正). Around 2007 Sixin Village school had over 100 students, and its smallest class had 9 students.

Students are required to attend larger schools beginning in grade 5.

== Climate ==
Climate data for Yunyang County, elevation 297 m (974 ft), (1991–2020 normals, extremes 1981–present)
Month	Jan	Feb	Mar	Apr	May	Jun	Jul	Aug	Sep	Oct	Nov	Dec	Year
Record high °C (°F)	19.1 (66.4)	25.9 (78.6)	35.7 (96.3)	37.7 (99.9)	40.9 (105.6)	40.5 (104.9)	42.0 (107.6)	42.9 (109.2)	41.5 (106.7)	34.5 (94.1)	26.8 (80.2)	20.5 (68.9)	42.9 (109.2)
Mean daily maximum °C (°F)	11.0 (51.8)	13.9 (57.0)	19.1 (66.4)	24.5 (76.1)	27.8 (82.0)	30.7 (87.3)	34.3 (93.7)	34.8 (94.6)	29.8 (85.6)	23.3 (73.9)	18.2 (64.8)	12.3 (54.1)	23.3 (73.9)
Daily mean °C (°F)	7.7 (45.9)	9.8 (49.6)	13.8 (56.8)	18.8 (65.8)	22.3 (72.1)	25.4 (77.7)	28.3 (82.9)	28.4 (83.1)	24.3 (75.7)	18.9 (66.0)	14.1 (57.4)	9.2 (48.6)	18.4 (65.1)
Mean daily minimum °C (°F)	5.4 (41.7)	7.0 (44.6)	10.2 (50.4)	14.7 (58.5)	18.6 (65.5)	21.8 (71.2)	24.2 (75.6)	24.1 (75.4)	20.8 (69.4)	16.1 (61.0)	11.7 (53.1)	7.1 (44.8)	15.1 (59.3)
Record low °C (°F)	−0.6 (30.9)	0.1 (32.2)	2.6 (36.7)	7.6 (45.7)	12.2 (54.0)	16.7 (62.1)	18.9 (66.0)	17.5 (63.5)	14.2 (57.6)	6.0 (42.8)	2.8 (37.0)	−0.6 (30.9)	−0.6 (30.9)
Average precipitation mm (inches)	14.0 (0.55)	21.0 (0.83)	47.5 (1.87)	92.0 (3.62)	164.0 (6.46)	167.6 (6.60)	171.9 (6.77)	138.4 (5.45)	141.0 (5.55)	98.7 (3.89)	49.7 (1.96)	13.9 (0.55)	1,119.7 (44.1)
Average precipitation days (≥ 0.1 mm)	6.9	6.7	10.4	13.9	15.6	14.8	12.8	11.0	12.1	13.8	9.8	7.4	135.2
Average snowy days	0.4	0.1	0.1	0	0	0	0	0	0	0	0	0.1	0.7
Average relative humidity (%)	74	71	70	73	76	79	75	72	75	81	80	78	75
Mean monthly sunshine hours	47.4	57.9	100.5	130.1	126.8	130.1	197.9	211.1	135.9	90.3	73.9	45.9	1,347.8
Percentage possible sunshine	15	18	27	33	30	31	46	52	37	26	23	15	29
Source: China Meteorological Administrationall-time July high
