= Fengjie County =

Fengjie 奉节县 Fengkieh
- County
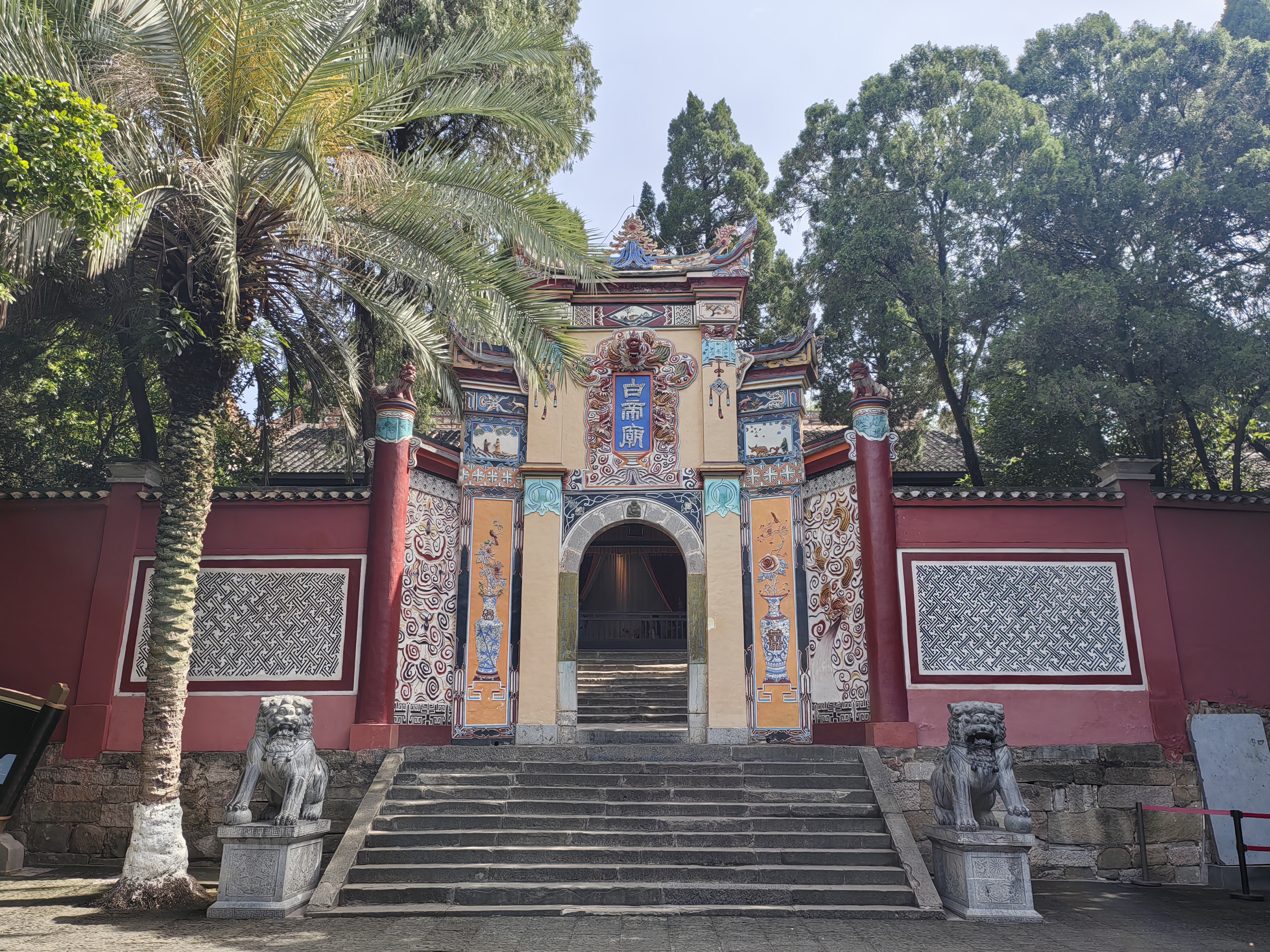
- Baidicheng

- Fengjie County in Chongqing
- Interactive map of Fengjie
- Coordinates (Fengjie County Bureau of Civil Affairs (民政局)): 31°01′03″N 109°27′39″E
- Country: People's Republic of China
- Municipality: Chongqing

Area
  - Total: 4,098 km^{2} (1,582 sq mi)

Population (2020)
  - Total: 744,836
  - Density: 181.8/km^{2} (470.7/sq mi)
- Time zone: UTC+8 (China Standard)
- Division code: FJE

Fengjie County
- Simplified Chinese: 奉节县
- Traditional Chinese: 奉節縣
- Postal: Fengkieh
Transcriptions
Standard Mandarin
- Hanyu Pinyin: Fèngjié Xiàn

Fengjie County (simplified Chinese: 奉节县; traditional Chinese: 奉節縣; pinyin: Fèngjié Xiàn) is a county of Chongqing Municipality, China. It is on the Yangtze River; located within a couple hundreds kilometers upstream from the Three Gorges Dam, it is within the dam's affected area.

The county's most famous geographical feature is the Qutang Gorge, the first of the Yangtze's Three Gorges.

Notable karst phenomena, including the Xiaozhai Tiankeng sinkhole are located within the county.

It is the place where Still Life was shot, a film by Jia Zhangke that won the 2006 Venice Film Festival (Golden Lion).

== History ==
The Fengjie county was established in 314 BC as Yufu County (魚復縣). In 649 AD, the name was changed to Fengjie, a reference to the loyalty of Zhuge Liang.

== Geography ==
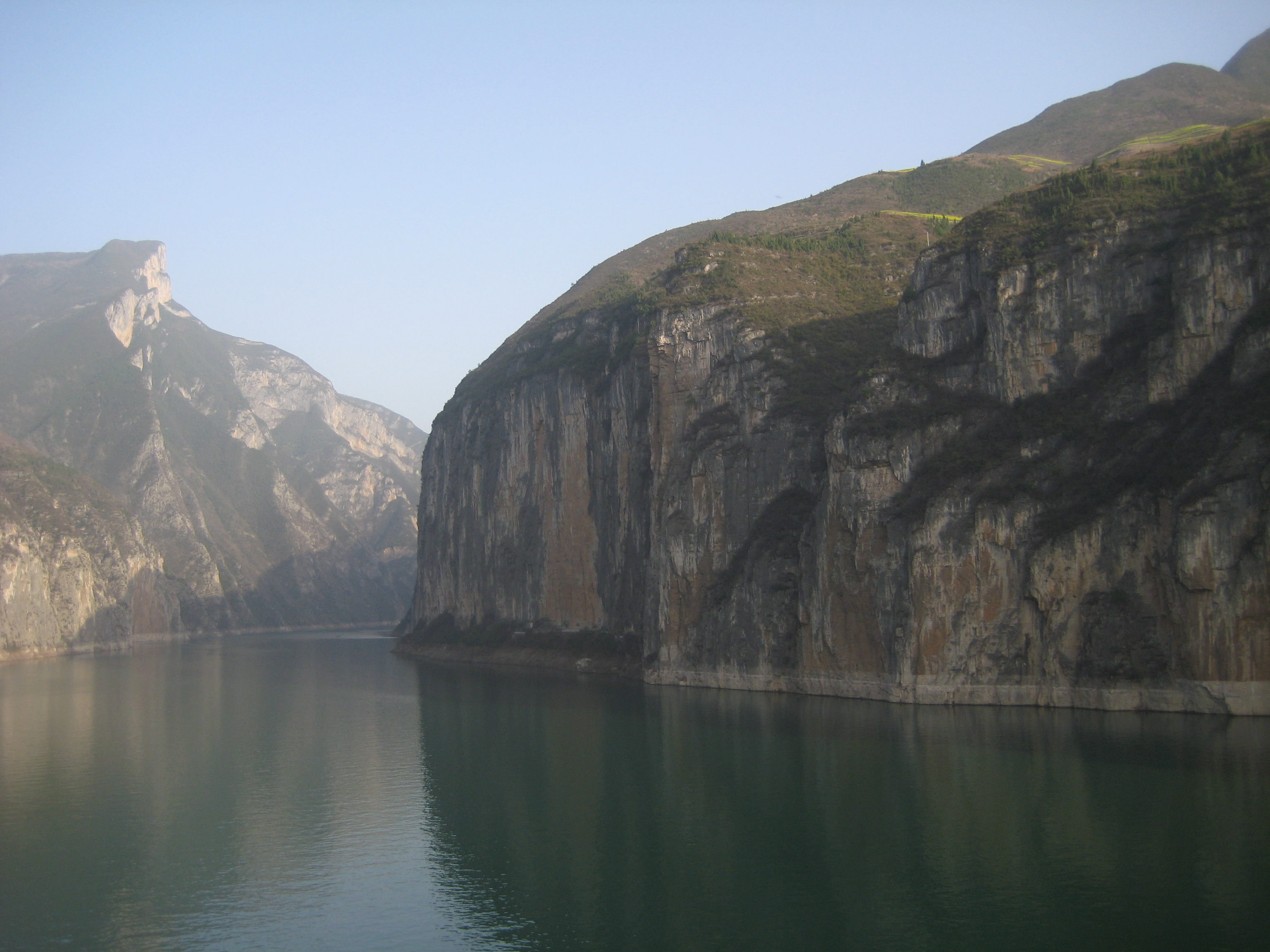
Kuimen in the Qutang Gorge

Fengjie County is located in the northeast of Chongqing, bordering Wushan County in the east, Enshi City (Hubei) in the south, Yunyang County in the west and Wuxi County in the north. It is 500 km (310 mi) away from downtown Chongqing, and administers 30 townships, 363 administrative villages and 23 residential committee. By the end of 2008, the population of the county is 1.04 million with male population of 540,000 persons, accounting for 51.9% and female population of 500,000 persons, accounting for 48.1%.

== Climate ==
Climate data for Fengjie, elevation 300 m (980 ft), (1991–2020 normals, extremes 1971–present)
Month	Jan	Feb	Mar	Apr	May	Jun	Jul	Aug	Sep	Oct	Nov	Dec	Year
Record high °C (°F)	18.4 (65.1)	23.2 (73.8)	35.8 (96.4)	33.6 (92.5)	37.3 (99.1)	37.6 (99.7)	38.6 (101.5)	39.6 (103.3)	38.5 (101.3)	32.2 (90.0)	26.9 (80.4)	17.7 (63.9)	39.6 (103.3)
Mean daily maximum °C (°F)	11.1 (52.0)	13.8 (56.8)	19.5 (67.1)	24.8 (76.6)	27.8 (82.0)	31.0 (87.8)	34.1 (93.4)	34.7 (94.5)	29.3 (84.7)	23.4 (74.1)	18.0 (64.4)	12.6 (54.7)	23.3 (74.0)
Daily mean °C (°F)	7.9 (46.2)	9.9 (49.8)	14.3 (57.7)	18.9 (66.0)	22.4 (72.3)	25.7 (78.3)	28.5 (83.3)	28.8 (83.8)	24.4 (75.9)	19.2 (66.6)	14.3 (57.7)	9.5 (49.1)	18.7 (65.6)
Mean daily minimum °C (°F)	5.7 (42.3)	7.2 (45.0)	10.6 (51.1)	14.8 (58.6)	18.6 (65.5)	22.1 (71.8)	24.6 (76.3)	24.6 (76.3)	21.0 (69.8)	16.5 (61.7)	11.9 (53.4)	7.3 (45.1)	15.4 (59.7)
Record low °C (°F)	−9.2 (15.4)	−3.4 (25.9)	−0.4 (31.3)	−0.1 (31.8)	7.8 (46.0)	13.0 (55.4)	16.6 (61.9)	15.9 (60.6)	11.5 (52.7)	3.2 (37.8)	0.6 (33.1)	−4.5 (23.9)	−9.2 (15.4)
Average precipitation mm (inches)	15.3 (0.60)	19.2 (0.76)	48.0 (1.89)	90.6 (3.57)	144.5 (5.69)	157.2 (6.19)	165.6 (6.52)	106.0 (4.17)	134.1 (5.28)	81.7 (3.22)	47.7 (1.88)	11.8 (0.46)	1,021.7 (40.23)
Average precipitation days (≥ 0.1 mm)	6.3	6.9	10.1	12.1	15.2	13.4	11.5	10.4	11.7	12.2	10.5	5.8	126.1
Average snowy days	0.6	0	0	0	0	0	0	0	0	0	0	0.1	0.7
Average relative humidity (%)	67	67	64	69	73	74	72	68	72	76	76	71	71
Mean monthly sunshine hours	56.3	57.2	105.8	130.9	124.6	124.3	175.5	195.3	123.1	100.6	82.0	65.6	1,341.2
Percentage possible sunshine	18	18	28	34	29	29	41	48	34	29	26	21	30
Source 1: China Meteorological Administration
Source 2: Weather China

== Administrative divisions ==
Subdistricts:

- Yong'an Subdistrict (永安街道), Yufu Subdistrict (鱼复街道), Kuimen Subdistrict (夔门街道)

Towns:

- Baidi (白帝镇), Caotang (草堂镇), Fenhe (汾河镇), Kangle (康乐镇), Dashu (大树镇), Zhuyuan (竹园镇), Gongping (公平镇), Zhuyi (朱衣镇), Jiagao (甲高镇), Yangshi (羊市镇), Tuxiang (吐祥镇), Xinglong (兴隆镇), Qinglong (青龙镇), Xinmin (新民镇), Yongle (永乐镇), Anping (安坪镇), Wuma (五马镇), Qinglian (青莲镇)

Townships:

- Yanwan Township (岩湾乡), Ping'an Township (平安乡), Hongtu Township (红土乡), Shigang Township (石岗乡), Kangping Township (康坪乡), Taihe Tujia Township (太和土家族乡), Hefeng Township (鹤峰乡), Fengping Township (冯坪乡), Chang'an Tujia Township (长安土家族乡), Longqiao Tujia Township (龙桥土家族乡), Yunwu Tujia Township (云雾土家族乡)

== Economy ==
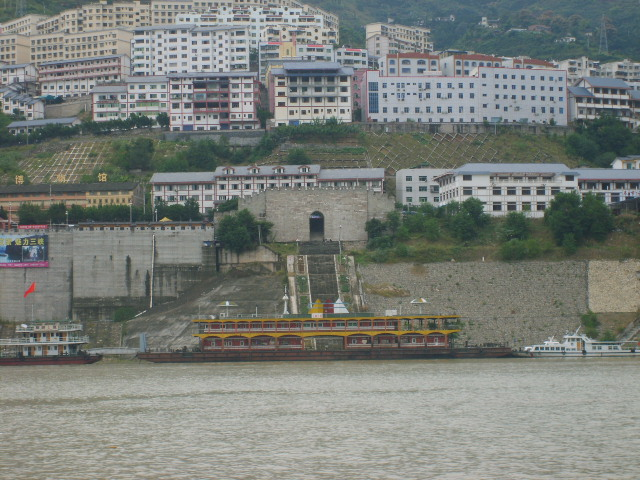
The Baotaping wharf

The GDP of Fengjie County ranked 25th among 40 county-level divisions (counties and districts) in Chongqing and 6th among all divisions in the northeast of Chongqing (11 counties and districts) in 2007. In 2007, the per capita net income of the peasants in Fengjie County is CNY 2,717.

It is known that the "collectively owned" land in Fengjie County were allocated the second time in 2005 after the first time in 1982-1983. Since then, the land has not been reallocated. Fengjie County Government encourages rural residents affected by development projects to become urban residents.

Migrant labor constitutes also an important part of the family income for the local rural residents. In some families, all the members are migrant labor. Their major occupations in urban areas cover restaurant operation, retailing and private business.

=== Agriculture ===
The area of land cultivated is 58,933 ha and with a per-capita land area of 0.85 mu. The major crops grown in the area include rice, corn, potato, sweet potato, oil plant and vegetable and major animals raised include pigs, cattle, sheep, poultry and fish. Apart from conventional agriculture, cash cropping is also carried out such as the growing of tobacco, navel oranges, cotton, walnuts, and silkworm farming.

== Transport ==
Fengjie has one Yangtze River crossing, the Fengjie Yangtze River Bridge.

== Resettlement controversy ==
Chen Maoguo (simplified Chinese: 陈茂国; traditional Chinese: 陳茂國; pinyin: chén mào guó, a.k.a. the "bird man", Chinese “鸟人”) protested against the low compensation received from relocation plans following the construction of a road entailing the demolition of his house. He was sentenced to prison for 3 years.

== See also ==
- Baidicheng
