= Furong River Bridge =

Furong River Bridge 芙蓉江特大桥
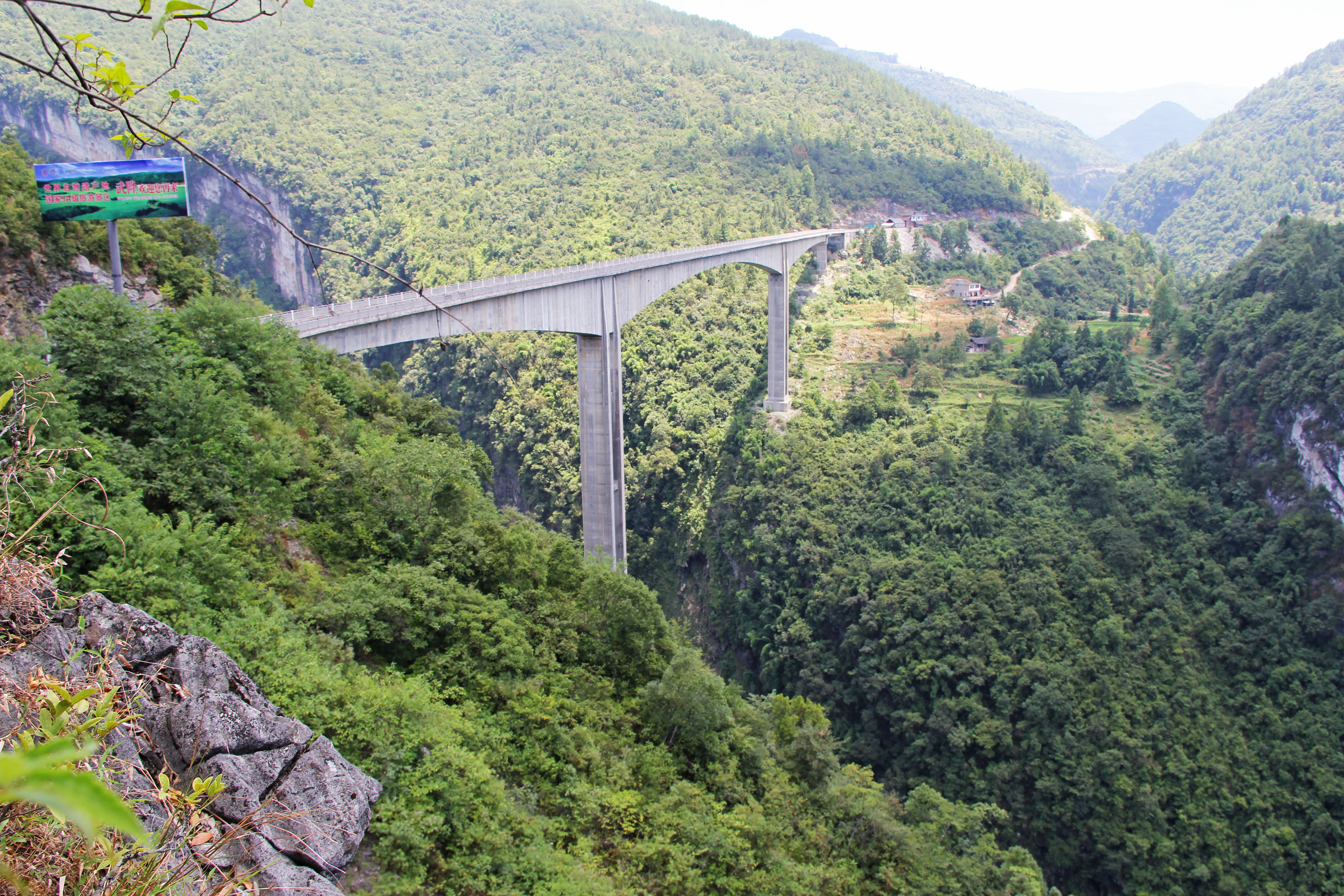
- Coordinates: 29.042°N 107.840°E
- Crosses: Furong River
- Locale: Haokouxiang, Chongqing, China

Characteristics
- Design: Beam Bridge
- Material: Concrete
- Total length: 549 metres (1,801 ft)
- Height: 240 metres (790 ft)
- Longest span: 230 metres (750 ft)

Location
- Interactive map of Furong River Bridge

Furong River Bridge is a concrete cantilever bridge near Haokouxiang, on the border of Wulong County and Pengshui Miao and Tujia Autonomous County in Chongqing, China. The bridge spans 230 metres (750 ft) over the Furong River a tributary of the Wu River. At 240 metres (790 ft) high it is among the 50 highest bridges in the world.

== Construction accident ==
During construction an accident occurred when a cable snapped causing a cableway container with over 20 workers to fall onto the partially built road deck. 11 workers died in the accident and 12 more were seriously injured.

== See also ==
List of highest bridges in the world
