= Yunyang Yangtze River Bridge =

Yunyang Bridge 云阳长江大桥
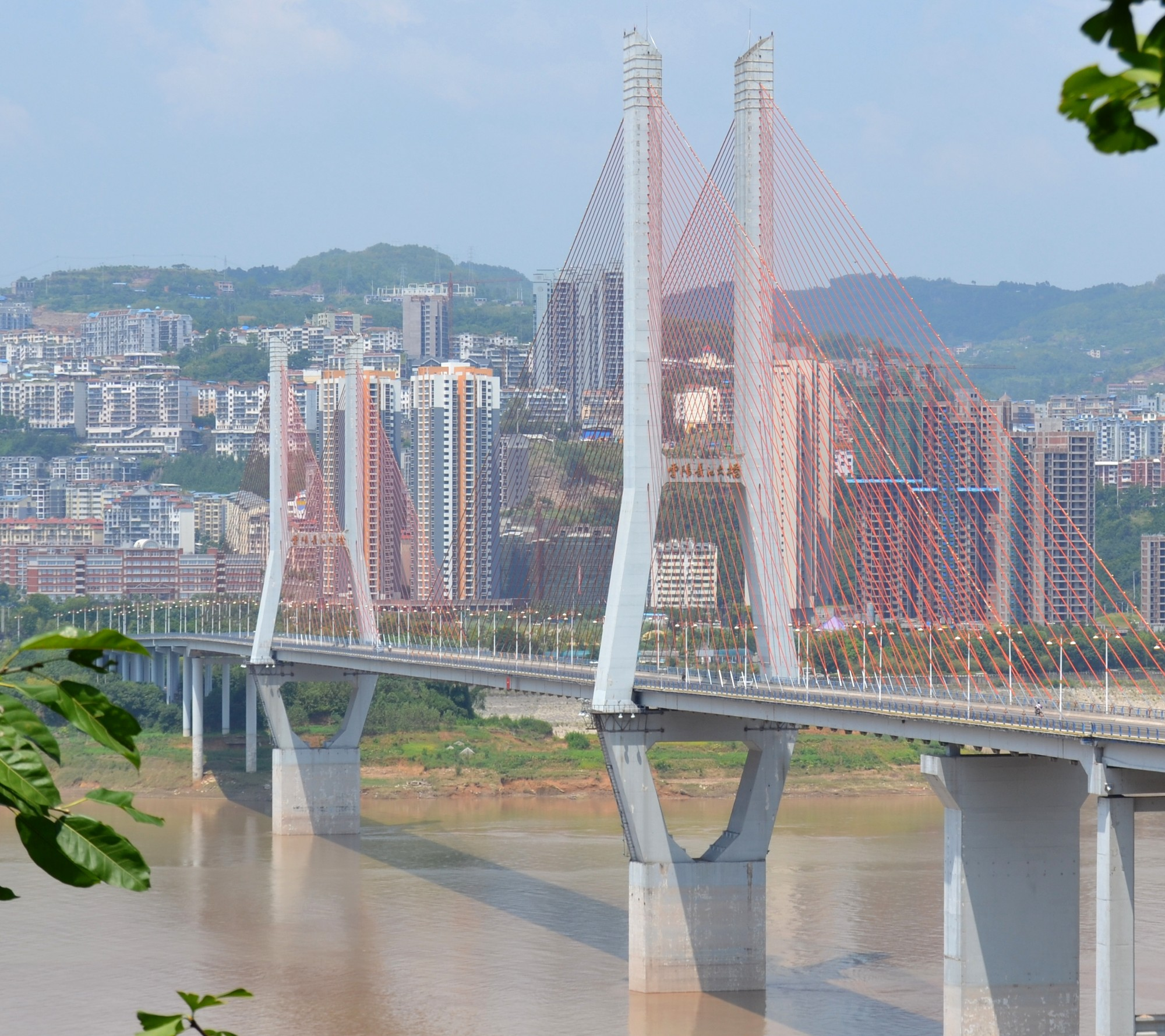
- Coordinates: 30.9155°N 108.71175°E
- Crosses: Yangtze River
- Locale: Yunyang, Chongqing, China

Characteristics
- Design: Cable-stayed
- Total length: Total: 1,278 metres (4,193 ft); Total span:637 metres (2,090 ft)
- Longest span: 318 metres (1,043 ft)
- Clearance above: 104 metres (341 ft)

History
- Opened: 2005

Location
- Interactive map of Yunyang Bridge

The Yunyang Yangtze River Bridge is an asymmetric cable-stayed bridge across the Yangtze River in Yunyang County, Chongqing, China. Completed in 2005, the bridge has a total length of 1,278 metres (4,193 ft) including approaches on either bank. The main bridge is 637 metres (2,090 ft) long, with the longest span of 318 metres (1,043 ft). The bridge sits 104 metres (341 ft) above the river. The asymmetric design of the bridge is different from most cable-stayed bridges. The southern tower is 26 metres (85 ft) higher than the northern tower.

== See also ==
- Yangtze River bridges and tunnels
