= Fengjie Yangtze River Bridge =

Fengjie Bridge 奉节长江大桥
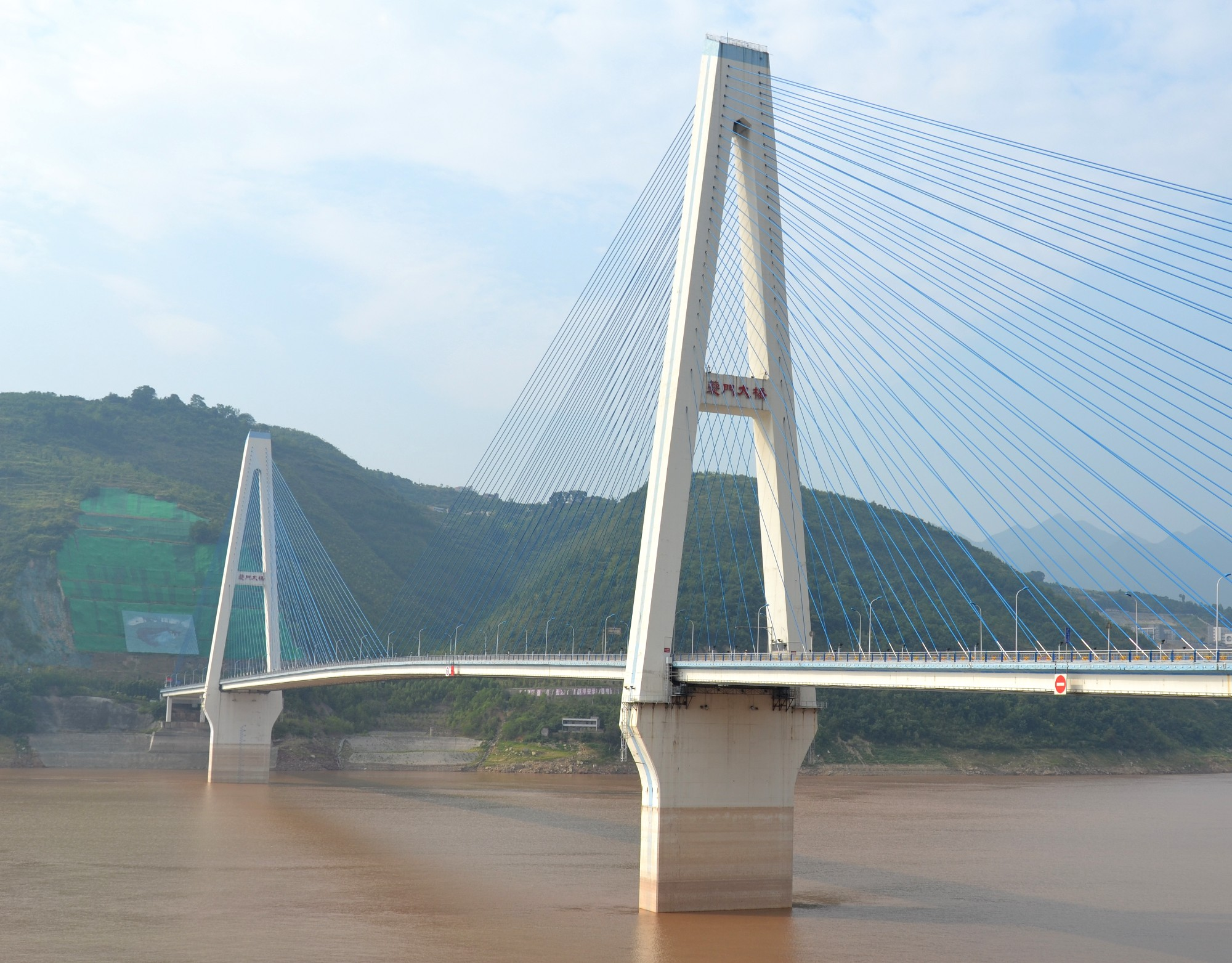
- Coordinates: 31°01′13″N 109°28′51″E
- Carries: S201 provincial road
- Crosses: Yangtze River
- Locale: Fengjie, Chongqing, China
- Other name: Kuimen Yangtze River Bridge

Characteristics
- Design: Cable-stayed
- Total length: 893 m (2,930 ft)
- Width: 18.5 m (61 ft)
- Height: 211.6 m (694 ft)
- Longest span: 460 m (1,509 ft)
- Clearance above: 110 m (361 ft)
- Clearance below: 18 m (59 ft)

History
- Construction start: 1999
- Opened: 2005

Location
- Interactive map of Fengjie Bridge

The Fengjie Bridge is a cable-stayed bridge which crosses the Yangtze River in Fengjie, Chongqing, China. Completed in 2005, it carries 4 lanes of traffic on the S201 provincial road. The bridges main span measures 460 metres (1,510 ft) which places it among the longest cable-stayed spans in the world. The bridge was constructed 110 metres (360 ft) above the original river; however the reservoir created by the Three Gorges Dam has increased the height of the water below the bridge and the clearance is vastly reduced.

== See also ==
- Bridges and tunnels across the Yangtze River
- List of bridges in China
- List of longest cable-stayed bridge spans
- List of highest bridges
- List of tallest bridges
