= Guizhou (disambiguation) =

Guizhou (贵州) is a province in southwestern China.

Guizhou may also refer to these places in China:

== Modern locations ==
- Guizhou, Hubei (归州), a town in Zigui County, Hubei, named after the historical prefecture
- Guizhou Subdistrict (归州街道), in Gaizhou, Liaoning, named after the historical prefecture

== Historical locations ==
- Guizhou (in modern Hubei) (歸州), a prefecture between the 7th and 20th centuries in modern Hubei
- Guizhou (in modern Guangxi) (桂州), a prefecture between the 6th and 12th centuries in modern Guangxi
- Guizhou (in modern Hebei) (媯州), a prefecture between the 7th and 10th centuries in modern Hebei
- Guizhou (in modern Liaoning) (歸州), a prefecture between the 11th and 12th centuries in modern Liaoning

== See also ==
- Gui (disambiguation)
