= Goy (disambiguation) =

Goy is a word used in Hebrew, Yiddish and English to mean a non-Jew.

Goy may also refer to:

- Goy (surname), a list of people with the surname
- Gang of Youths, an Australian alternative rock band
- 't Goy, a village in the Netherlands
- Goa, a state of India, locally known as Goy

== See also ==
- GOJ (disambiguation)
- Goi (disambiguation)
- Shabbos goy, a person who assists Jews by performing certain acts for them on the Jewish Sabbath
- Giy (disambiguation)
- G0y, a subculture in the United States
