= Guyi =

Guyi may refer to the following places in China:

- Guyi, Guangxi, town in Sanjiang County, Guangxi
- Guyi, Heilongjiang, town in Tahe County, Heilongjiang
- Guyi, Hubei, town in Xiangyang, Hubei
- Guyi Subdistrict, Qionglai, Sichuan

== See also ==
- Gui (disambiguation)
- Guy (disambiguation)
- Gyi (disambiguation)
