= Kathi Burke =

Irish non-fiction illustrator

- Born: Dunmore East, County Waterford
- Other name: Fatti Burke
- Occupations: Illustrator; author
- Known for: Irelandopedia
- Notable work: Irelandopedia, Historopedia, Foclóiropedia, Animalopedia, Little Library series
- Website: kathiburke.com

Kathi Burke, better known by her penname Fatti Burke, (Note: Her website says "The artist formerly known as Fatti") is an Irish Waterford-based non-fiction artist, illustrator and author. She is best known for Irelandopedia, Historopedia and Foclóiropedia; a trilogy of mini-encyclopedias she created with her father John Burke and the Little Library series of books.

== Biography ==
Burke was born in Dunmore East, County Waterford and studied visual communications at the National College of Art and Design (NCAD) in Dublin for 4 years from 2008–2012. After finishing NCAD, she worked in graphic design for a year before she focused on Illustrating. In 2014, she began volunteering for a confidential domestic abuse helpline once a week. She received a master's degree in Children's Literature at Trinity College Dublin in 2023.

In 2015, Burke was included on the Irish Independent's "Rising Female Stars of 2015" list, where she said that "International Women's Day was a reminder that there is still so much for women to work towards in terms of the roles we demand in society." Later that year, she released her first and most popular book; the Irelandopedia, a mini-encyclopedia with a page for every Irish County and some additional pages for general Irish culture. The Irelandopedia won the RTÉ Audience Choice Award at the Irish Book Awards in 2015 and the Merit Award at the KPMG Children's Books Ireland Awards in 2016.

On 17 May 2024, during the build up to the 2024 Summer Olympics in Paris, she held a webinar with the Holy Cross Mercy School in Killarney, County Kerry where she taught the children how to draw atheletes that were competing in the Summer Olympics. It was held as part of the PTSB Dare to Believe Olympic Schools Programme. In June and August 2024, she exhibited Lotus Hall, a tapestry depicting the view from the window in her childhood home in Dunmore East, at the Garter Lane Arts Centre in Waterford.

== Works illustrated ==
- Burke, John (2016). Irelandopedia: A Compendium of Maps, Facts and Knowledge. Dublin: Gill Books. ISBN 978-0-7171-6938-2.
- — (2016). Historopedia: The Story of Ireland From Then Until Now. Dublin: Gill Books. ISBN 978-0-7171-7113-2.
- — (2017). Foclóiropedia: A Journey Through the Irish Language from Arán to Zú. Dublin: Gill Books. ISBN 978-0-7171-7554-3.
- Turner, Tracey (2017). Facts!: One for Every Day of the Year. London: Bloomsbury Publishing. ISBN 978-1-4088-8462-1.
- Membrino, Anne (2018). I Look Up To... Ruth Bader Ginsburg. New York: Random House. ISBN 978-0-5255-7952-6.
- — (2018). I Look Up To... Michelle Obama. New York: Random House. ISBN 978-0-5255-7954-0.
- Burke, John (2018). Granuaile: The Pirate Queen. Little Library no. 1. Dublin: Gill Books. ISBN 978-0-7171-8350-0.
- Membrino, Anne (2019). I Look Up To... Serena Williams. New York: Random House. ISBN 978-0-5256-4442-2.
- — (2019). I Look Up To... Malala Yousafzai. New York: Random House. ISBN 978-0-5256-4440-8.
- Kelly, Michael; Ní Chíobháin, Muireann (2019). GIY's Know-it-Allmanac. Waterford: GIY Ireland. ISBN 978-0-9930-4262-1.
- Burke, John (2019). Brian Boru: The Warrior King. Little Library no. 2. Dublin: Gill Books. ISBN 978-0-7171-8456-9.
- — (2019). Constance Markievicz: The Rebel Countess. Little Library no. 3. Dublin: Gill Books. ISBN 978-0-7171-8455-2.
- Cheshire, Simon (2019). Epic Tales of Triumph and Adventure. London: Bloomsbury Publishing. ISBN 978-1-5266-0112-4.
- Membrino, Anne (2019). I Look Up To...Misty Copeland. New York: Random House. ISBN 978-1-9848-5214-4.
- — (2019). I Look Up To...Oprah Winfrey. New York: Random House. ISBN 978-1-9848-5212-0.
- Burke, John (2020). Tom Crean: The Brave Explorer. Little Library no. 4. Dublin: Gill Books. ISBN 978-0-7171-8656-3.
- — (2020). Mary Robinson: A Voice for Fairness. Little Library no. 5. Dublin: Gill Books. ISBN 978-0-7171-8993-9.
- Burke, Fatti (2020). What the Dinosaurs Saw: Life on Earth Before Humans. London: Bloomsbury Publishing. ISBN 978-1-5476-0689-4.
- British Museum (2021). Find Tom in Time: Ancient Egypt. London: Nosy Crow. ISBN 978-1-7880-0101-4.
- — (2021). Find Tom in Time: Ming Dynasty China. London: Nosy Crow. ISBN 978-1-7880-0717-7.
- — (2021). Find Tom in Time: Ancient Rome. London: Nosy Crow. ISBN 978-1-7880-0716-0.
- — (2021). Find Tom in Time: Ancient Greece. London: Nosy Crow. ISBN 978-1-7880-0658-3.
- — (2022). Find Tom in Time: Michelangelo's Italy. London: Nosy Crow. ISBN 978-1-8399-4215-0.
- Burke, John (2022). Michael Collins: The People's Peacemaker. Little Library no. 6. Dublin: Gill Books. ISBN 978-0-7171-9410-0.
- British Museum (2023). Find Tom in Time: Shakespeare's London. London: Nosy Crow. ISBN 978-1-8399-4515-1.
- Burke, John (2025). Animalopedia: A Menagerie of Every Irish Animal You Can Think Of!. Dublin: Gill Books. ISBN 978-1-8045-8246-6.
- — (2025). Irelandopedia: A Compendium of Maps, Facts and Knowledge (Tenth anniversary ed.). Dublin: Gill Books. ISBN 978-1-8045-8414-9.

== Awards ==
Award	Year	Title	Book
Irish Book Awards	2015	RTÉ Audience Choice Award	Irelandopedia
KPMG Children's Books Ireland Awards	2016	Judges' Special Award	Irelandopedia
KPMG Children's Books Ireland Awards	2016	Éilís Dillon Award for a First Children's Book	Irelandopedia
Irish Book Awards	2016	Children's Book of the Year (Junior) (Nomination)	Historopedia
Irish Book Awards	2016	Book of the Year Award (Nomination)	Historopedia
Irish Book Awards	2017	Children's Book of the Year (Junior) (Nomination)	Foclóiropedia
Irish Book Awards	2025	Specsavers Children's Book of the Year (Senior)	Animalopedia
