= Giy =

Giy or GIY may refer to:

- GIY Ireland (Grow It Yourself Ireland), an Ireland-based global movement known as GIY
- Yoy people or Giy, an ethnic group in Southeast Asia
- Probiz Guinee (ICAO Airline code: GIY)
- Giyani Airport (IATA airports code), South Africa; See List of airports by IATA code: G
- Giyug language (ISO 639:g language code: Giy)

== See also ==
- GIY-YIG, a structural family of Homing endonuclease
- Guy (disambiguation)
- Gay (disambiguation)
- Goy (disambiguation)
