= GOJ =

Goj or GOJ may refer to:

- Goj, Silesian Voivodeship, Poland
- Ervin Goj (1905–1989), Czech poet
- Ghosts of Jupiter, an American rock band
- Government of Jamaica
- Government of Japan
- Government of Jersey
- Gowlan tongue
- Strigino International Airport, serving Nizhny Novgorod, Russia

== See also ==
- Goi (disambiguation)
- Goy (disambiguation)
