= Guys =

Guys may refer to:

- Guys, Tennessee, a little town
- Constantin Guys (1802–1892), Dutch-born war correspondent, painter and illustrator
- The Guys, a 2002 play by Anne Nelson
- Guys (comics), the seventh novel in Canadian cartoonist Dave Sim's Cerebus comic book series
- Guys Snack Foods, a snack foods manufacturer and distributor based in Overland Park, Kansas, with a target market being the Midwest.
- GUYS, an attack team featured in the Japanese television series Ultraman Mebius

== See also ==
- Guy (disambiguation)
