= Gui =

Gui or GUI may refer to:

== People ==
=== Surname ===
- Gui (surname), an ancient Chinese surname, xing
- Bernard Gui (1261 or 1262–1331), inquisitor of the Dominican Order
- Davy Gui (born 2006), Ivorian footballer
- Luigi Gui (1914–2010), Italian politician
- Gui Minhai (born 1964), Chinese–born Swedish scholar and publisher
- Vittorio Gui (1885–1975), Italian composer

=== Given name ===
- MC Gui (born 1998), Brazilian singer, songwriter and racing driver
- Gui Bonsiepe (born 1934), German designer and academic
- Gui Boratto (born 1974), Brazilian musician
- Gui Carvalho (born 2002), Brazilian basketball player
- Gui de Cambrai (fl. 1190–1220), French writer
- Gui de Cavalhon (fl. 1200–1229), Provençal nobleman
- Gui Guerrejat (died 1178), Occitan noble
- Gui de Maillesec (died 1412), French bishop and cardinal
- Gui Mallon (born 1953), Brazilian composer
- Gui Rochat (born 1933), American art dealer
- Gui d'Ussel (fl. 1195–1209), French troubadour

== Places ==
- Guangxi, abbreviated in Chinese as Guì (桂), a province of China
- Guizhou, abbreviated in Chinese as Guì (贵), a province of China
- Gui, Burkina Faso
- Gui Prefecture (disambiguation)
- Gui River, in China
- Guinea, IOC country code GUI

== Technology ==
- Graphical user interface

== Other uses ==
- Gui (food), Korean grilled dishes
- Gui (vessel), a type of ancient Chinese ritual vessel
- Ghosts in Chinese culture (鬼)
  - Ghost (Chinese constellation)
- Golfing Union of Ireland
- Guide Bridge railway station, England
- Güiria Airport, Venezuela

== See also ==
- Guy (disambiguation)
