= Houten =

- Municipality
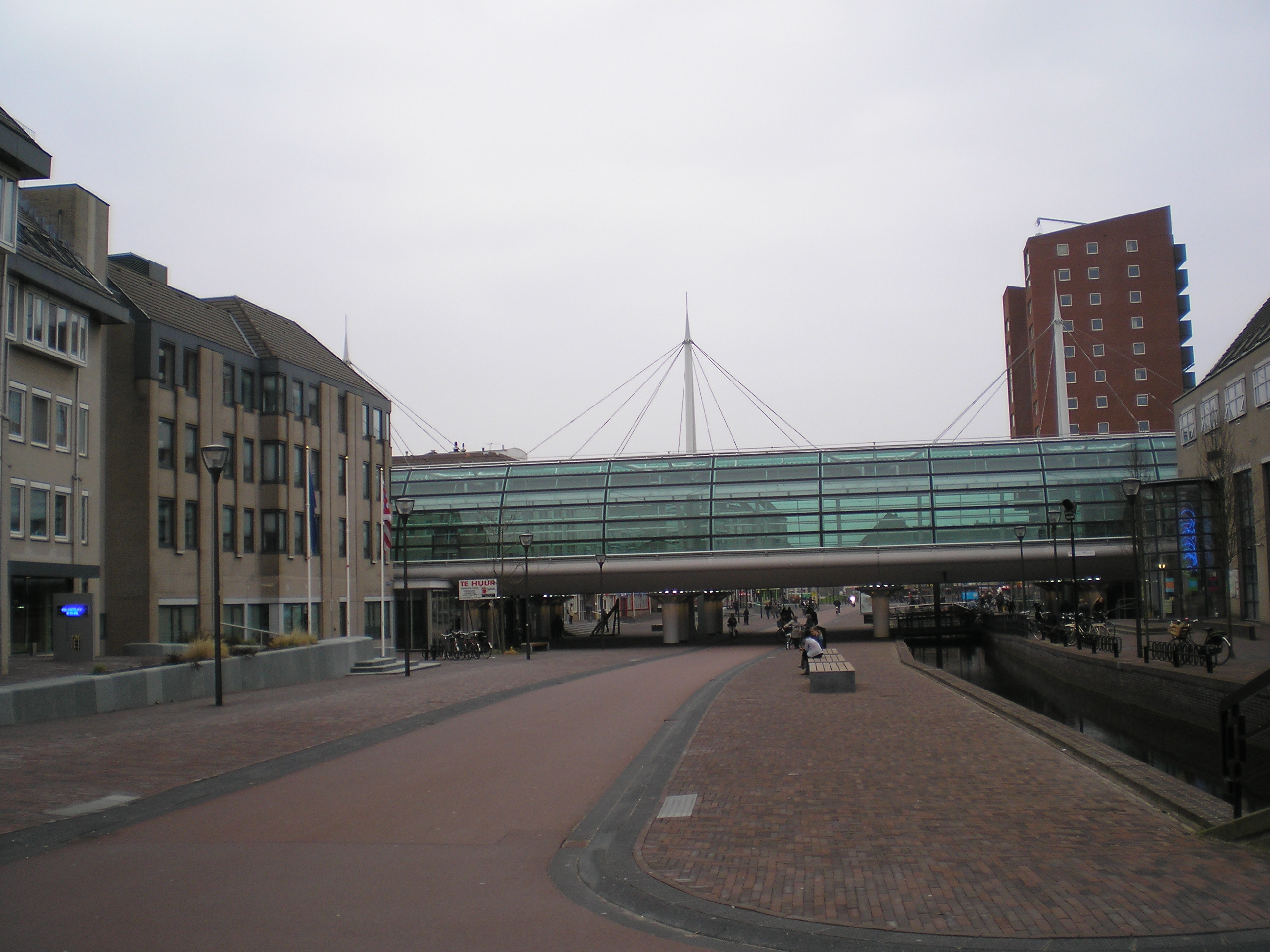
- Town hall and station in Houten

- Flag Coat of arms

- Location in Utrecht
- Coordinates: 52°2′N 5°10′E
- Country: Netherlands
- Province: Utrecht

Government
  - Body: Municipal council
  - Mayor: Karen Heerschop (Ind.)

Area
  - Total: 58.99 km^{2} (22.78 sq mi)
  - Land: 54.94 km^{2} (21.21 sq mi)
  - Water: 4.05 km^{2} (1.56 sq mi)
- Elevation: 2 m (6.6 ft)

Population (January 2021)
  - Total: 50,223
  - Density: 914/km^{2} (2,370/sq mi)
- Time zone: UTC+1 (CET)
  - Summer (DST): UTC+2 (CEST)
- Postcode: 3990–3999
- Area code: 030
- Website: www.houten.nl

Houten (Dutch pronunciation: [ˈɦʌutə(n)]) is a municipality in the Netherlands, in the province of Utrecht.

== Population centres ==
The municipality consists of the following towns:

- 't Goy
- Houten
- Schalkwijk
- Tull en 't Waal

=== Houten (town) ===
The main town in the municipality is Houten, a commuter town about 9 km southeast of Utrecht. On 1 January 2020, the town had 50,177 inhabitants (municipality). The built-up area was 5.08 km^{2} (1.96 sq mi) in area, and contained 20,010 residences in 2018. The slightly larger statistical district of Houten had a population of about 39,100 in 2004.

== History of Houten ==
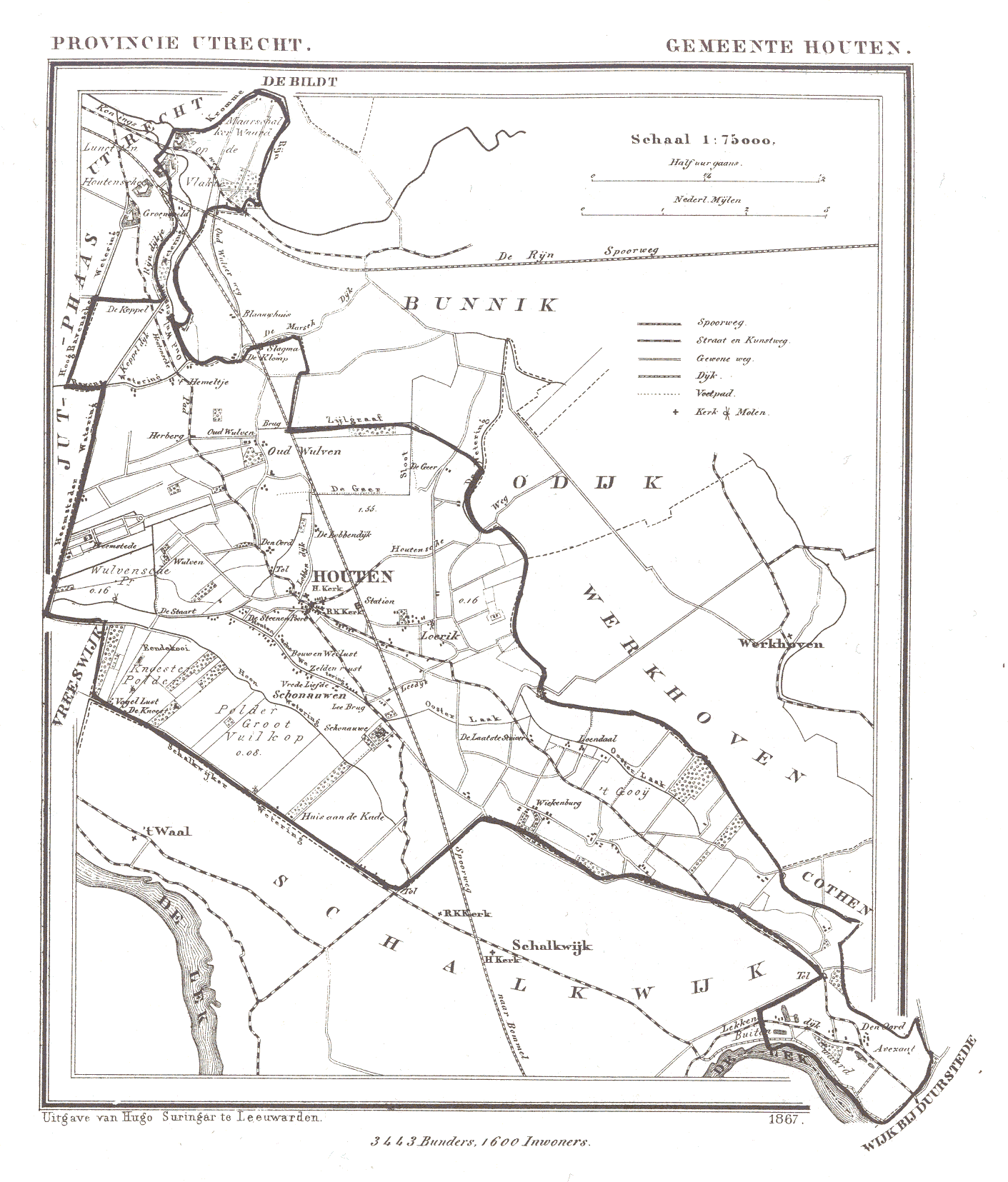
Historical map of Houten

Remains of a Roman villa have been found in the old centre of Houten, made visible in a street pattern. These remains were discovered in 1957.

In the Dark Ages, Houten took shape as a rural centre. The area of the municipality of Houten was divided in the so-called gerechten ("districts"), the names of which are still in use: Schonauwen, Wulven, Waijen, Heemstede.

Many elements of present-day Houten are remnants of its history. Prominent in the old centre (Het Oude Dorp, "The Old Town") are the Roman Catholic Church (1884) and the Protestant Church (1563). The first accounts of the older church date from the ninth century; the oldest parts of the present church building are probably from the eleventh century. Another prominent building is the restaurant-cafe De Engel ("The Angel"), already mentioned in the 16th century as a tavern.

Former access roads to the old centre are still recognisable by their names, such as the Odijkseweg and Loerikseweg. Houten had many orchards, but few have survived.

=== The expanding city 1966–1998 ===
Modern Houten started to take shape late in the 20th century (1966–1998). It was first designated by the office of Wissing-Derks as a Groeikern -– a centre of growth –- to meet the needs of the growing city of Utrecht. From the beginning, urban planner-designer Robert Derks was involved with the development of New Town Houten. Construction of 10,000 new dwellings began in 1979, and the population grew from 4,000 to more than 30,000 by the end of the century.

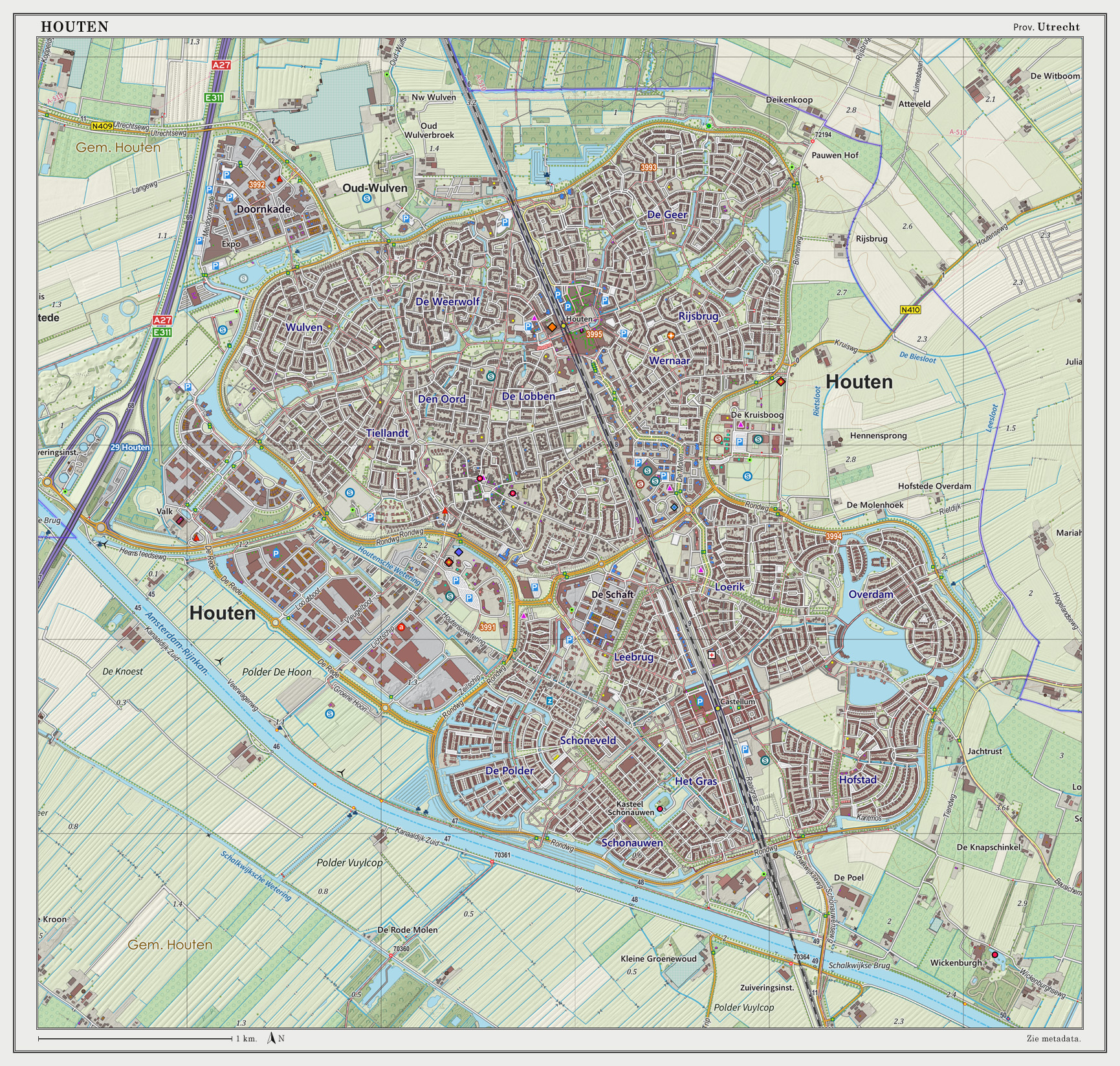
Dutch Topographic map of Houten (town), March 2014

=== Second designation as a centre of urban growth 1992–2015 ===
By 2015, some 7,000 new houses had been built in Houten-Zuid, following the same urban design principles as in the existing northern part of Houten, with some differences. The body of water to the east is large in comparison with water bodies in the old parts of Houten. The pentagonal green zone in Houten-Zuid embracing the centre is different from the green zone in Houten-Noord, which runs through the whole city in a linear structure, crossing the new city centre and with larger parks at either end. Another difference is that in some places cars share the road with bicycle paths (this concept was later applied in the northern part as well). The southern part was also designed by Robert Derks and his office for urban design Stedenbouw BV.

== Transport ==
=== Rail ===
Houten has two railway stations, Houten (opened in 1868, closed in 1934, re-opened on a different location in 1982 and restructured in 2010) and Houten Castellum (opened in 2010). These stations are served by local commuter trains to Utrecht (northbound) and Geldermalsen (southbound, with subsequent connections to Tiel and 's-Hertogenbosch/Breda). The railway has been doubled from two tracks to four, to accommodate for an extra stop at Castellum with a frequency of four trains per hour in each direction.

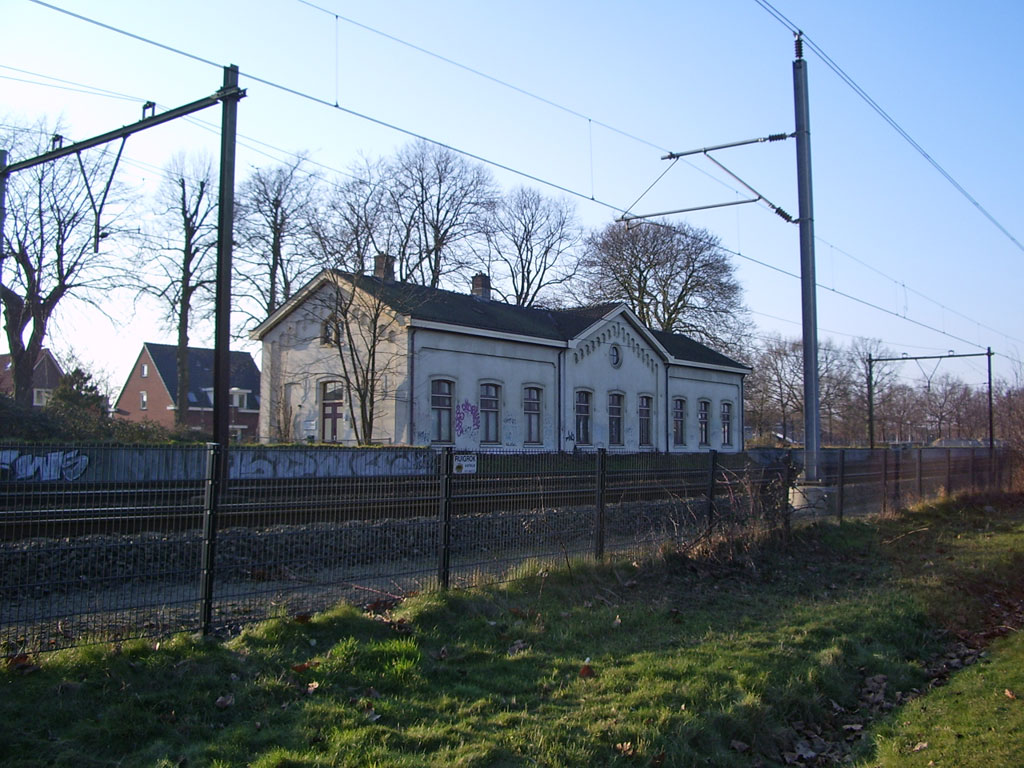
Old railway building

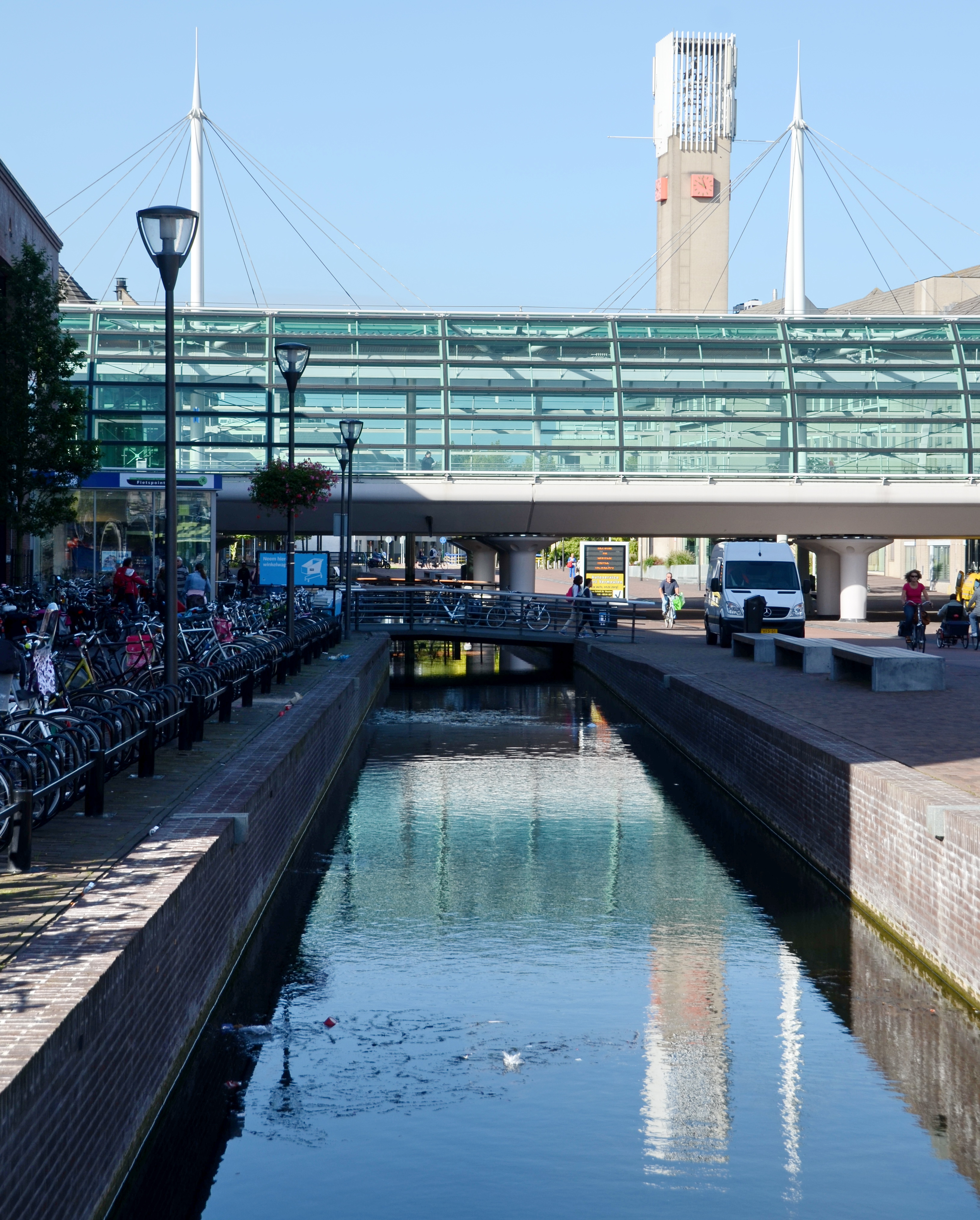
Modern railway station at centre of Houten

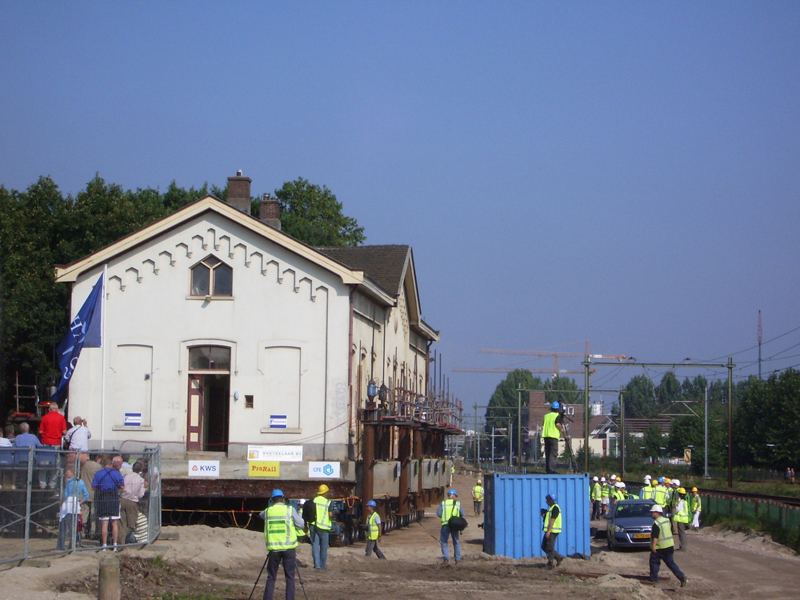
Relocation of old railway building (24 aug 2007)

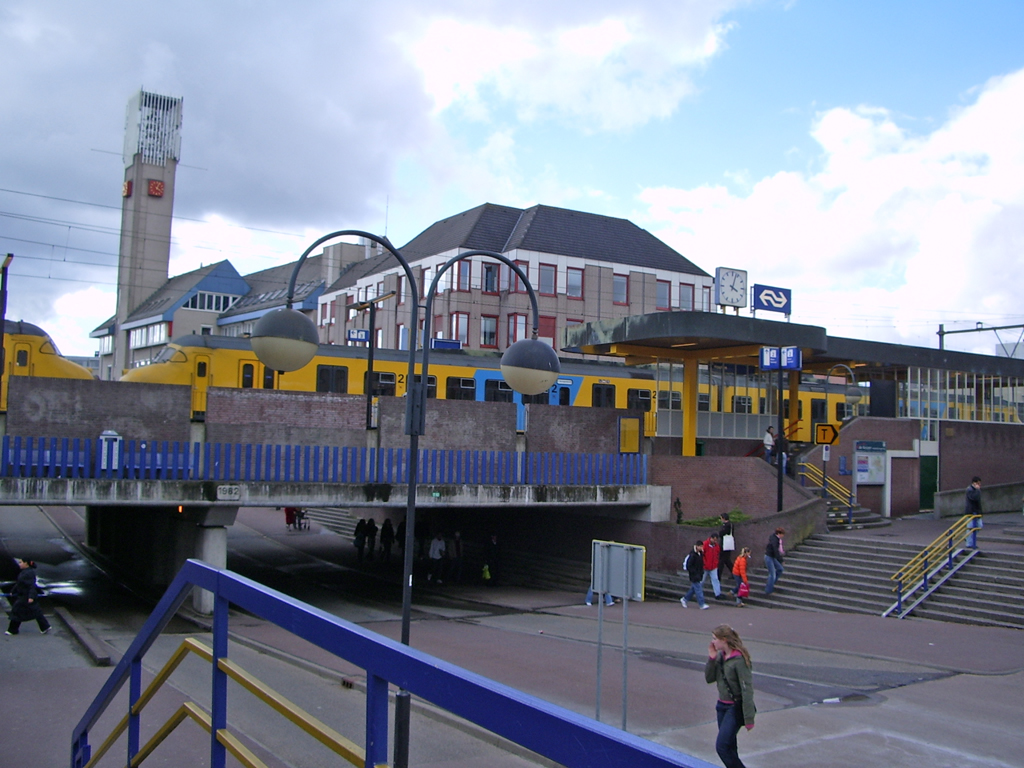
Houten Station (1982)

=== Bus ===
Busses travel to regional destinations, such as Nieuwegein and Utrecht.

=== Bike ===
Like most Dutch cities, Houten is well adapted to the high number of cyclists. Unlike other cities Houten is built around a system of car-free public space combined with the infrastructure for slow traffic. The design principle of separating cycling and walking from car traffic has been pushed to the limit. Houten is unique in this. Cycling comfort and safety are extremely high (optimal), even by Dutch standards. A large network of bike paths makes it convenient to cycle to various destinations and within the town the bike is the most popular means of transport.

On 29 October 2008, Houten was chosen as Fietsstad 2008 — the top BikeCity of the Netherlands for 2008. The same happened on 16 January 2018, when Houten was praised for its all round cycling characteristics and again voted the Fietsstad 2018 — the nations top BikeCity for 2018. Since the first bicycle city election in 2002, Houten is the only city to win the title twice. The city of Houten is known, nationally and internationally, as a practical example of bicycle friendliness. A growing number of groups with politicians, developers, designers and students visit Houten for study purposes and inspiration.

=== Car ===
To the west, Houten has its own exit from the A27 motorway, and the N409 (single carriageway with bus lane) runs from Houten to Nieuwegein. To the east and south, there are only local roads, not designed for through traffic. A connection to the A12 motorway to the north is the N421 (single carriageway).

The only way to get from one district to another is via the ring road which circles around Houten, thus preventing through traffic in residential areas. Maximum speed on most of the ring road is 70 km/h (43 mph).

== Urban planning and architecture ==
=== Sustainable urban design ===
Houten is internationally known for its urban design. Because of the city structure, people are encouraged to travel by bike and train. Distinctive qualities of Houten include the accessibility of the railway station, green and water zones throughout the whole city, numerous soccer and basketball fields, high standard of accommodation for different groups and the child-friendly bicycle paths. It is one of the safest cities in the Netherlands. Cyclists and cars are able to avoid each other: an extensive network of bicycle tracks connects the different districts of the town, while cars have to go to the city ring road before they can go to another part of the city.

Thomas House is a small-scale housing complex in Houten for adults with intellectual disabilities, opened in 2013.

=== Remarkable buildings in Houten ===
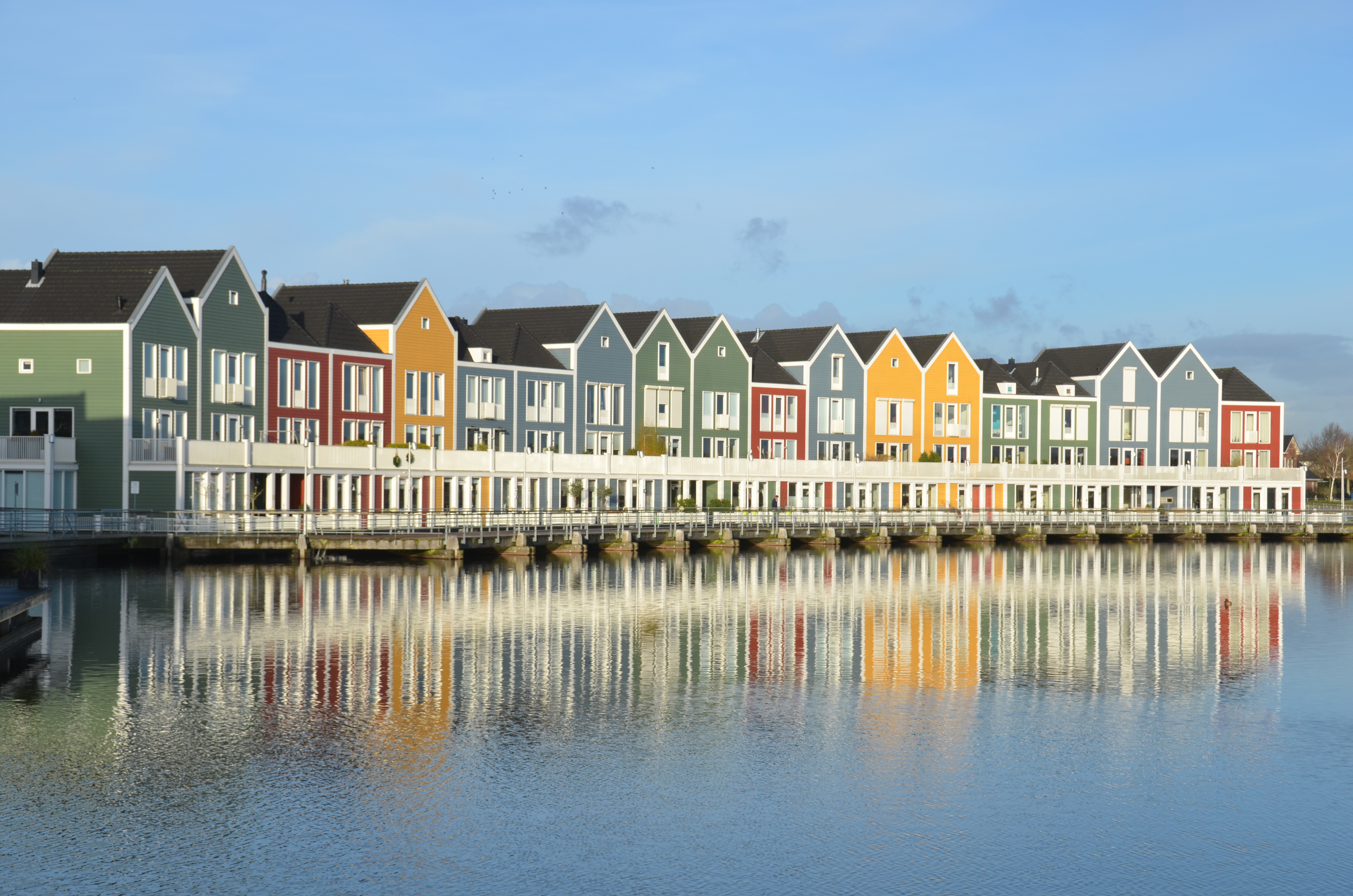
Traditional style houses at Rietplas

- Aluminiumcentre Aluminium wood (Micha de Haas)
- Pyramid-shaped apartment complex Het Domein (Das brothers, Alberts & Van Huut))
- Total petrol station (Samyn and Partners)
- Fire department (Samyn and Partners)
- De Kniphoek - Rietplas (Hans Been Architecten)
- The Golden House (Micha de Haas)
- railway station bicycle transferium (Movares\StudioSK, Henk Woltjer)
- JOINN! (De Wit architecten)

== Famous people from Houten ==
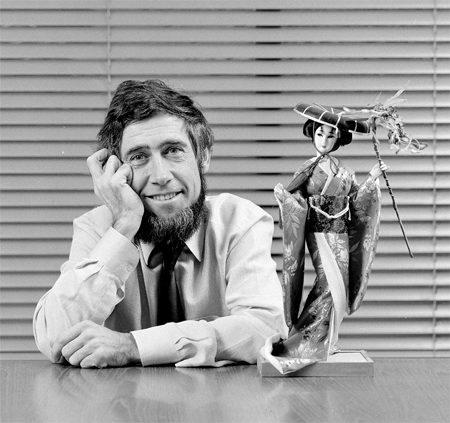
Chriet Titulaer, 1984

- Bart de Ligt (1883 in Schalkwijk – 1938) a Dutch anarcho-pacifist and antimilitarist; supported conscientious objectors
- Chriet Titulaer (1943-2017) a Dutch astronomer, TV presenter and popular science writer; lived in Houten
- Branimir Štulić (born 1953), singer-songwriter, musician, author and former frontman of rock group Azra; lives in Houten
- Peter van Dalen (born 1958) a Dutch politician and Member of the European Parliament
- Ruud Kuijer (born 1959 in Schalkwijk) a Dutch sculptor, known for his Water works
- Bram Snepvangers (born 1976) plays the card game Magic: The Gathering; lives in Houten
- Rutger Bregman (born 1988) a Dutch historian and author, best known for Utopia for Realists; lives in Houten
- Noël van 't End (born 1991) a Dutch judoka, competed at the 2016 Summer Olympics
- Def Rhymz (born 1970) Dutch rapper; lived in Houten
