= Gui Prefecture (Liao dynasty) =

Historical administrative division in Liaoning, China

Guizhou or Gui Prefecture (Chinese: 歸州) was a zhou (prefecture) in imperial China centering on modern Gaizhou, Liaoning, China. It was created during the Liao dynasty, and taken out by the succeeding Jin dynasty.

It was part of the Shanhou region, which included eight other prefectures situated to the northwest of the Taihang Mountains.

== Geography ==
The administrative region of Guizhou in the Liao dynasty falls within modern southern Liaoning. It probably includes modern:

- Under the administration of Yingkou:
  - Gaizhou
- Under the administration of Dalian:
  - Wafangdian
