= Garter Lane Arts Centre =

Arts centre and theatre

Coordinates: 52.26186°N 7.11458°W

Garter Lane Arts Centre is an arts centre and theatre with studio spaces and exhibition spaces located on O'Connell Street, Waterford City, Ireland. It was opened in 1984 by Niall Tóibín at 5 O'Connell St. A former Georgian house formerly owned by prominent Quaker Merchant Samuel Barker, the building has also served in the past as a social welfare office and a library. The centre now operates from two buildings: Garter Lane Arts Centre (22a O'Connell St.), and Garter Lane Studios (5 O'Connell St.).

As the Garter Lane Arts Centre, it looks to fulfill the artistic needs of the south east of Ireland. The centre welcomes over 35,000 visitors annually over both of its buildings. It celebrated its 40th anniversary in 2024.

== History of building ==
Thought to be built between 1720 and 1740, 5 O'Connell St was a Friends meeting house until 1972 when it was relocated to a site adjacent to the Newtown School. It was also briefly a branch of the Provincial Bank of Ireland.

== Exhibiting artists ==
- "Outlandish" by Owen de Forge 24 Feb - 23 May 2026.

== Studio artists ==
As of 2025:

- Kathi Burke
- Burke
- Brendan Butler
- Maddie Cahill-Byrne
- Julie Cusack
- Rachel Roberts
- Sammy Kane
- Denise McAuliffe
- Aimee Roche
- Cúan Cusack
- Marcella Meagher
- Sharon Fleming
