= Pothuizen =

Coordinates: 51°58′42″N 5°13′20″E

Pothuizen is a former village in the Dutch province of Utrecht. It was located on the Lek river north of Culemborg, and stretched along the Lek dike on both sides of the Schalkwijkse Wetering.

The area was part of the heerlijkheid of Schalkwijk, and later the municipality Schalkwijk, which became part of Houten in 1962.

Around 1850, Pothuizen had about 140 inhabitants in 10 houses. The name "Pothuizen" appeared on topographical maps until the end of the 19th century. Although the houses of the former hamlet still exist, the hamlet is no longer recognized. The area is now called "Pothoek".

"Pothuizen" can also be spelt "Pothuijsen"
