= Schalkwijk, Utrecht =

Schalkwijk
- Village
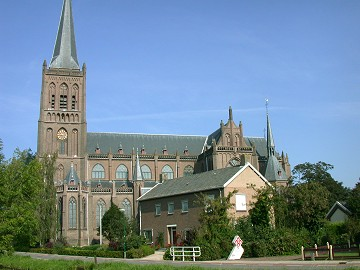
- St. Michael's Church

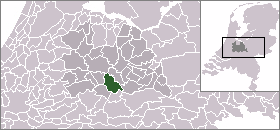

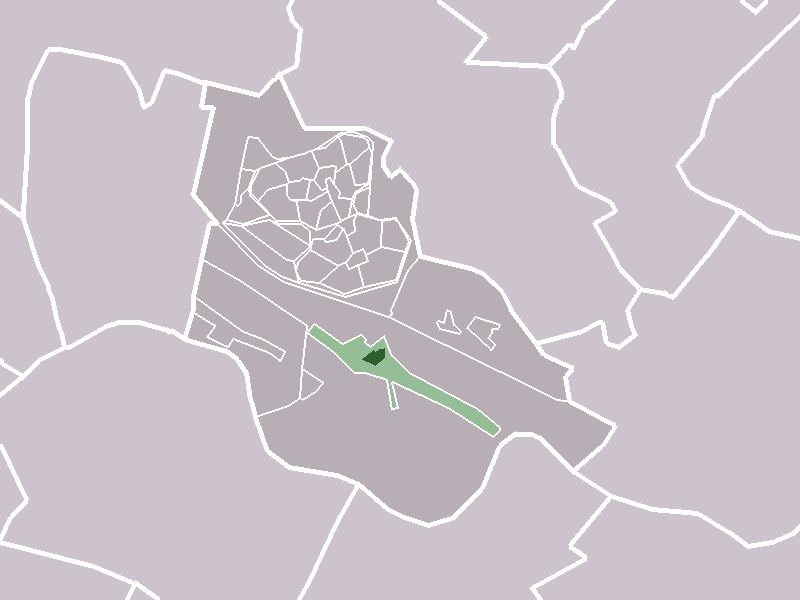
- The village center (dark green) and the statistical district (light green) of Schalkwijk in the municipality of Houten.
- Coordinates: 51°59′38″N 5°11′14″E
- Country: Netherlands
- Province: Utrecht
- Municipality: Houten

Population (2005)
  - Total: 1,973
- Time zone: UTC+1 (CET)
  - Summer (DST): UTC+2 (CEST)

Schalkwijk (Dutch pronunciation: [ˈsxɑl(ə)kˌʋɛik]) is a small village in the Dutch province of Utrecht. It consists of a small village centre on the railway line between Utrecht and 's-Hertogenbosch and a 5 km long ribbon of farms along the small channel Schalkwijksche Wetering.

The statistical district of Schalkwijk had a population of about 1650 in 2004.

== History ==
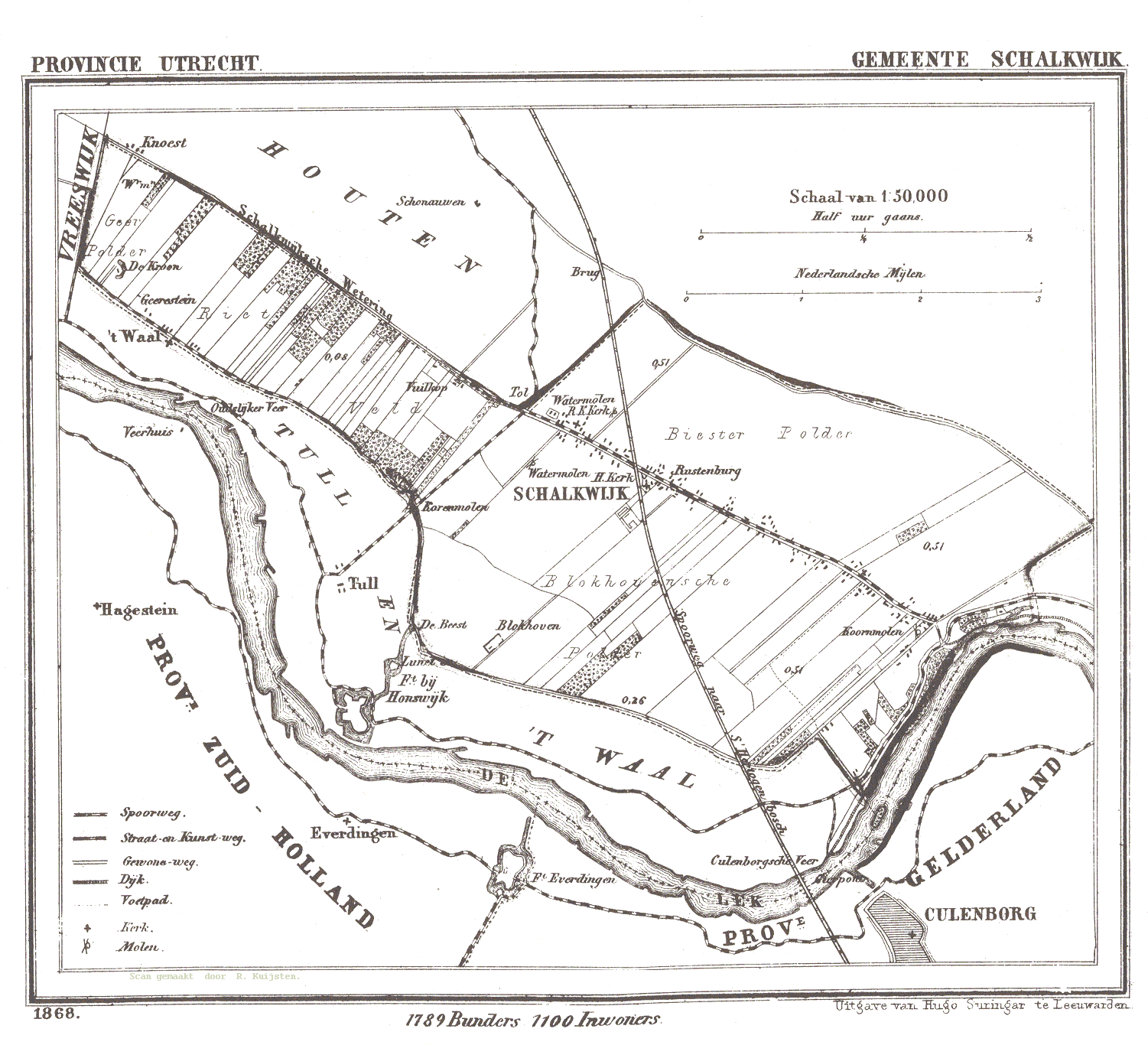
Municipality of Schalkwijk in 1868

According to the 19th-century historian A.J. van der Aa, Schalkwijk was a heerlijkheid owned by the lords of Culemborg. In 1523, the dike of the Lek river at Schalkwijk broke, and the village was severely damaged by the flooding.

When the current municipal system was introduced in the Netherlands in 1812, Schalkwijk and Tull en 't Waal merged to become a single municipality called Schalkwijk. In 1818, Tull en 't Waal became independent again, and Schalkwijk was a separate municipality until it merged with Houten on 1 January 1962.

The municipality of Schalkwijk included the village of Schalkwijk itself and the surrounding former hamlets Rietveld, Blokhoven, and Pothuizen. Its area was 17.9 km^{2} (6.9 sq mi). Most of the inhabitants were Roman Catholic, and went to church in the St. Michael's Church in the village centre.

When the railway line between Utrecht and 's-Hertogenbosch opened in 1868, a station was opened in Schalkwijk, but it was closed in 1935.

Historical population
Year	Pop.	±%
1829	1,029	—
1849	1,134	+10.2%
2004	1,650	+45.5%

== Born in Schalkwijk ==
- Ruud Kuijer (b. 1959), sculptor
- Jan-Willem van Schip (b. 1994), professional cyclist
