= Tull en 't Waal =

- Village
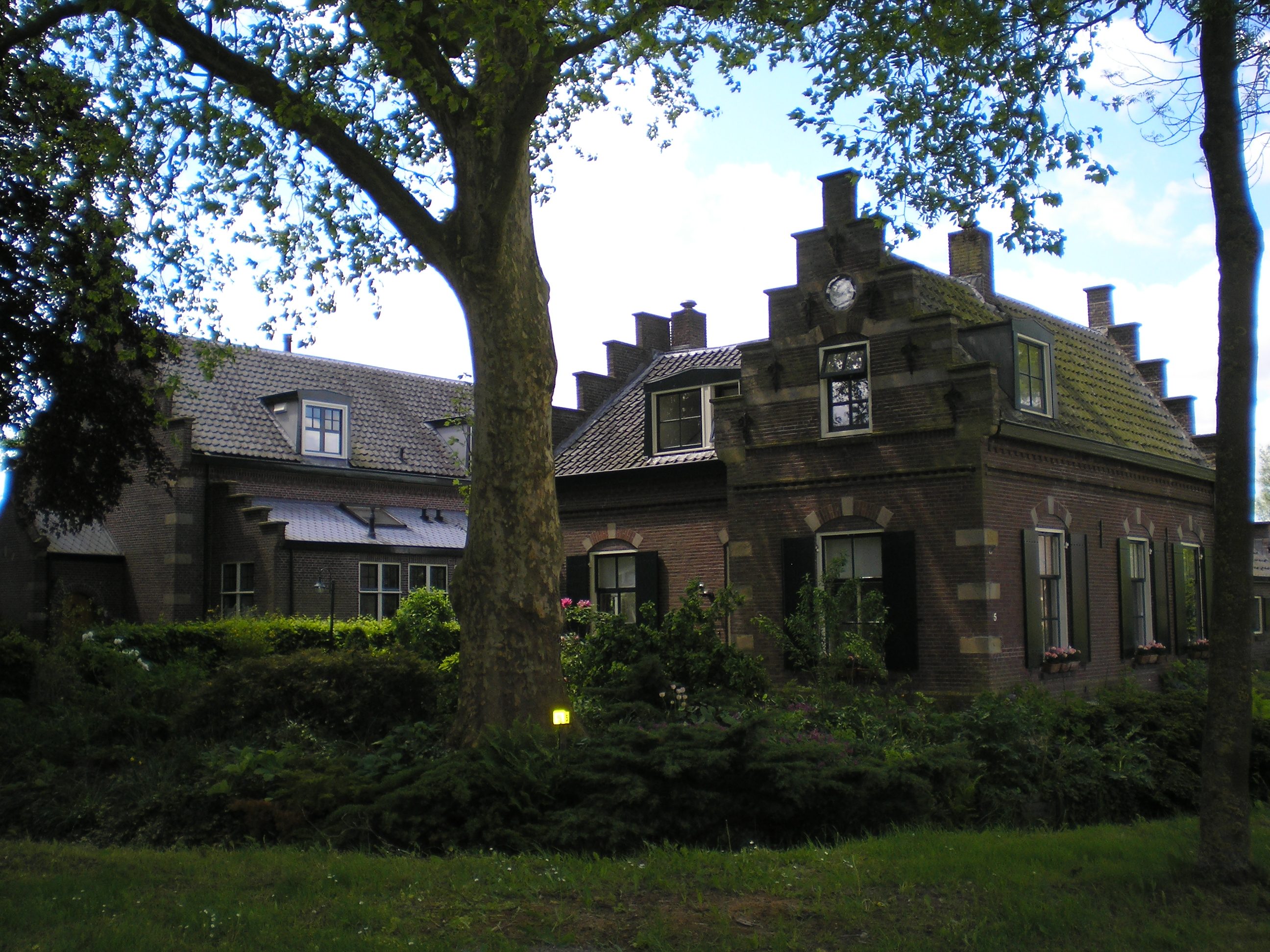
- School in Tull en 't Waal

- Location in the Netherlands Tull en 't Waal (Netherlands)
- Coordinates: 52°0′2″N 5°7′59″E
- Country: Netherlands
- Province: Utrecht
- Municipality: Houten

Area
  - Total: 6.23 km^{2} (2.41 sq mi)
- Elevation: 2 m (6.6 ft)

Population (2021)
  - Total: 760
  - Density: 120/km^{2} (320/sq mi)
- Time zone: UTC+1 (CET)
  - Summer (DST): UTC+2 (CEST)
- Postal code: 3999
- Dialing code: 030

Tull en 't Waal is a village in the Dutch province of Utrecht. Until 1962, it was a separate municipality, but now it is a part of the municipality of Houten. Originally, there were two villages: 't Waal, at the site of the present village; and Tull, more to the south. It also has a ferry connection to the town of Culemborg. It is located close to the Lek River.

== History ==
Tull is first mentioned in 1155 as "in loco qui dicitur Tylle". The etymology is unclear. 't Waal was first mentioned in 1307 as Wale, and means "pool after a dike breach". In 1504, the hamlets are first mentioned as Tul ende tWael. The village is a 12th century peat excavation project along the Waalsewetering. The church is a medieval building which was extensively modified in 1778 and 1890. The hamlet Honswijk used to be part of the village, but was transferred to Schalkwijk. In 1840, Tull en 't Waal was home to 532 people.

Werk aan de Waalse Wetering is a military fortification as part of the Dutch Water Line. It was constructed in 1815, and has bomb proof barracks. The fort became obsolete after the introduction of the air plane. It was later used by the Nederlandse Spoorwegen to store bridging material. In 1999, it was converted into a tea house and camping.

== Gallery ==
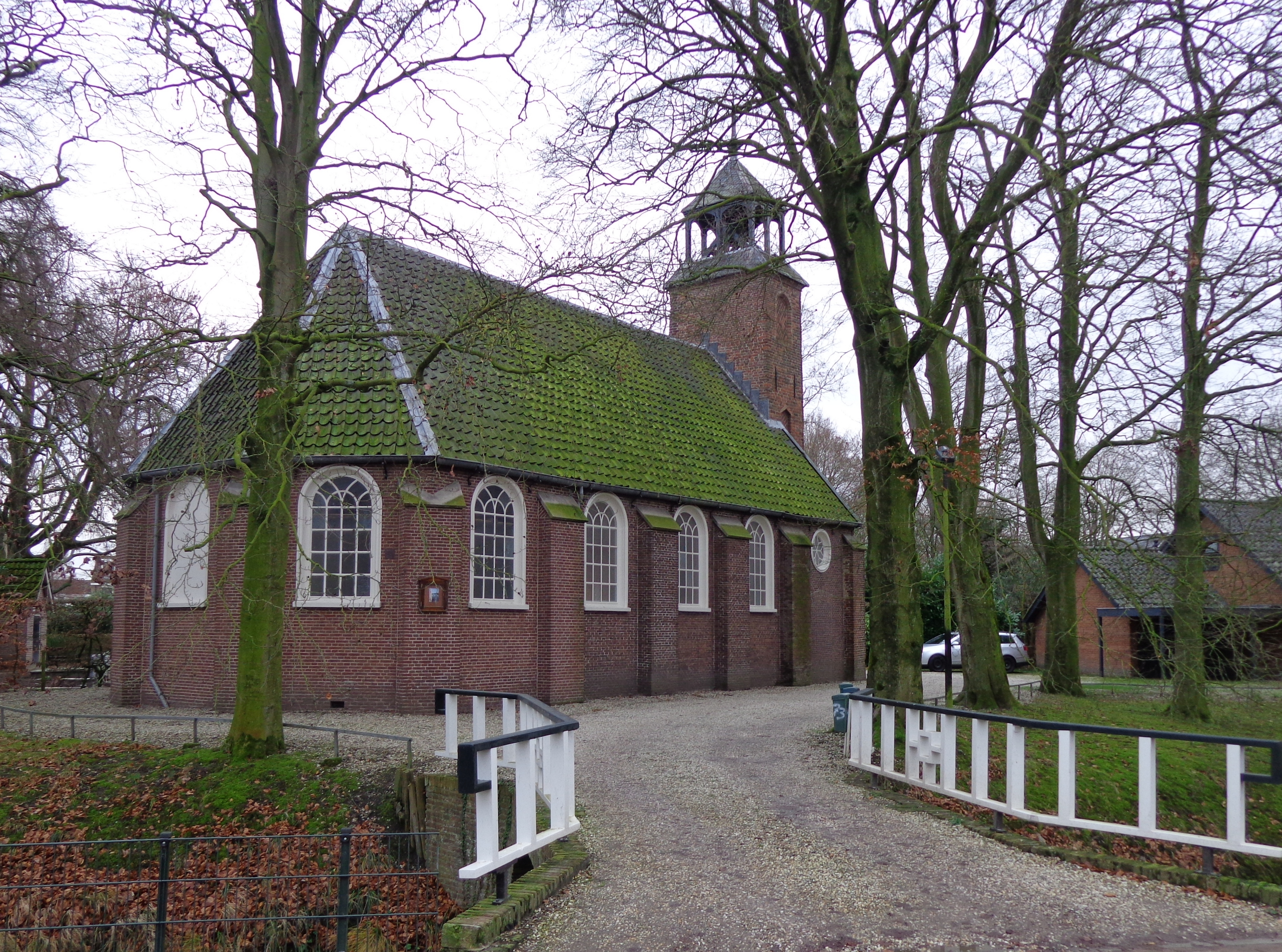
Protestant Church

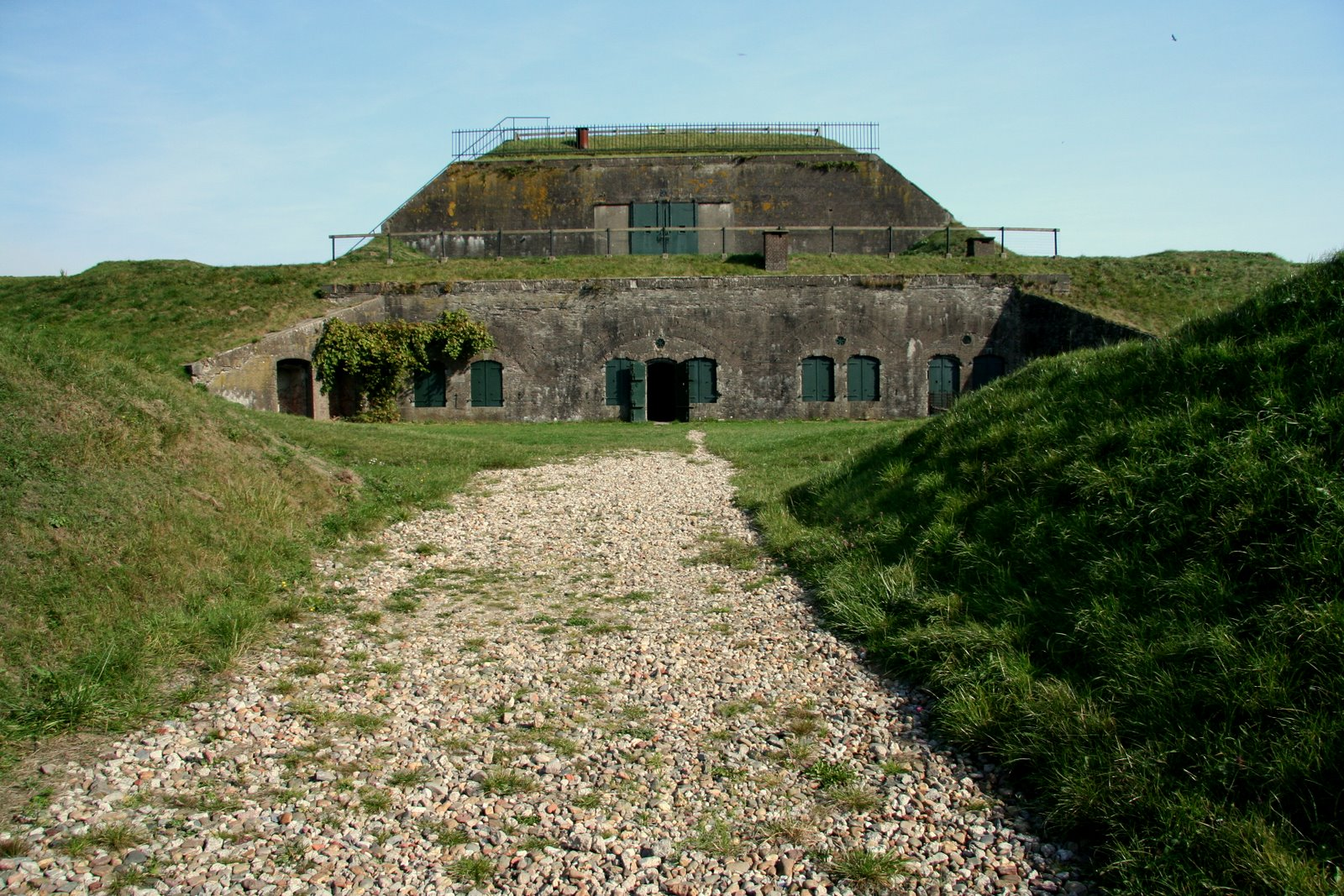
Barracks of the Waalse Wetering

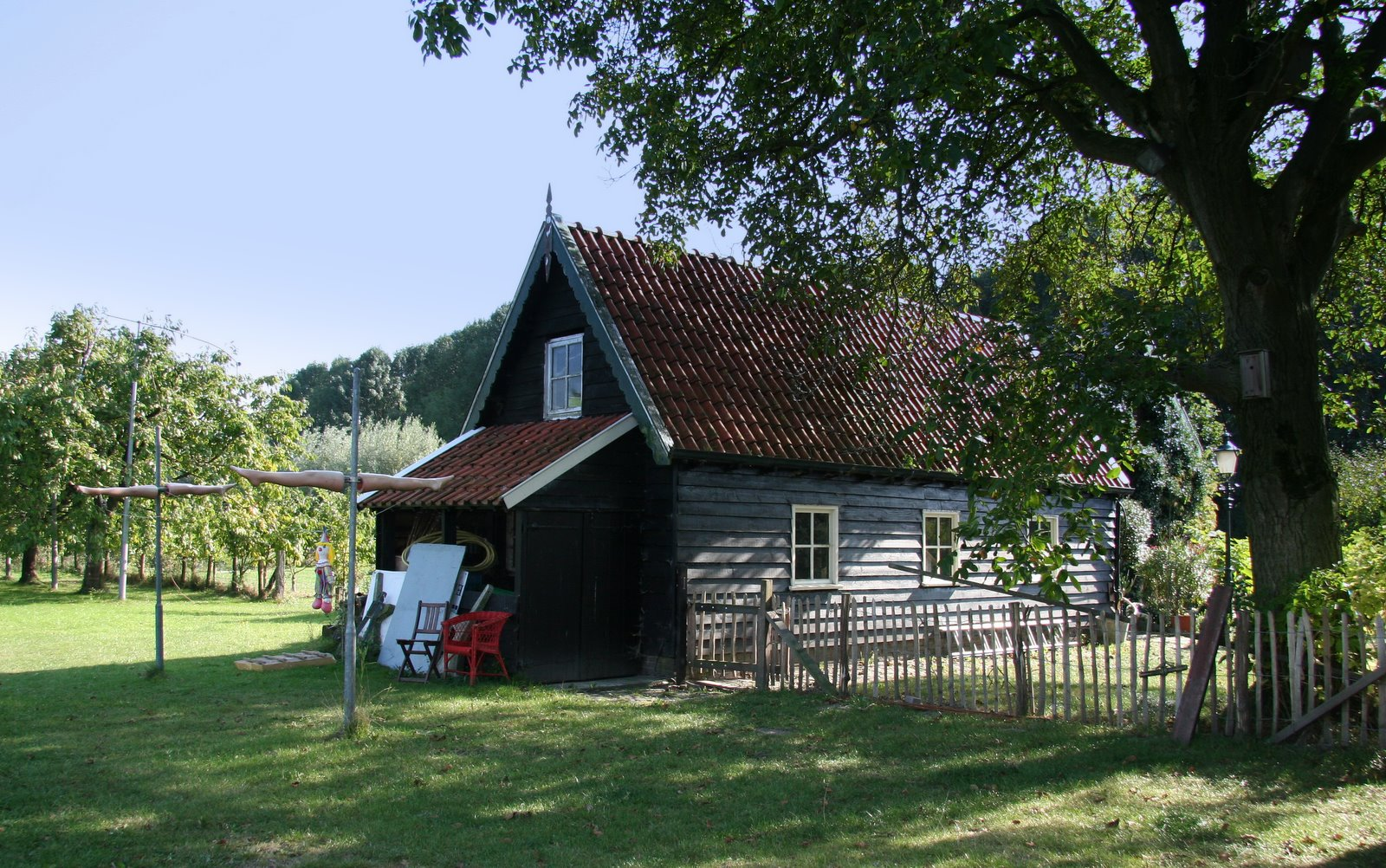
Fort watchman house

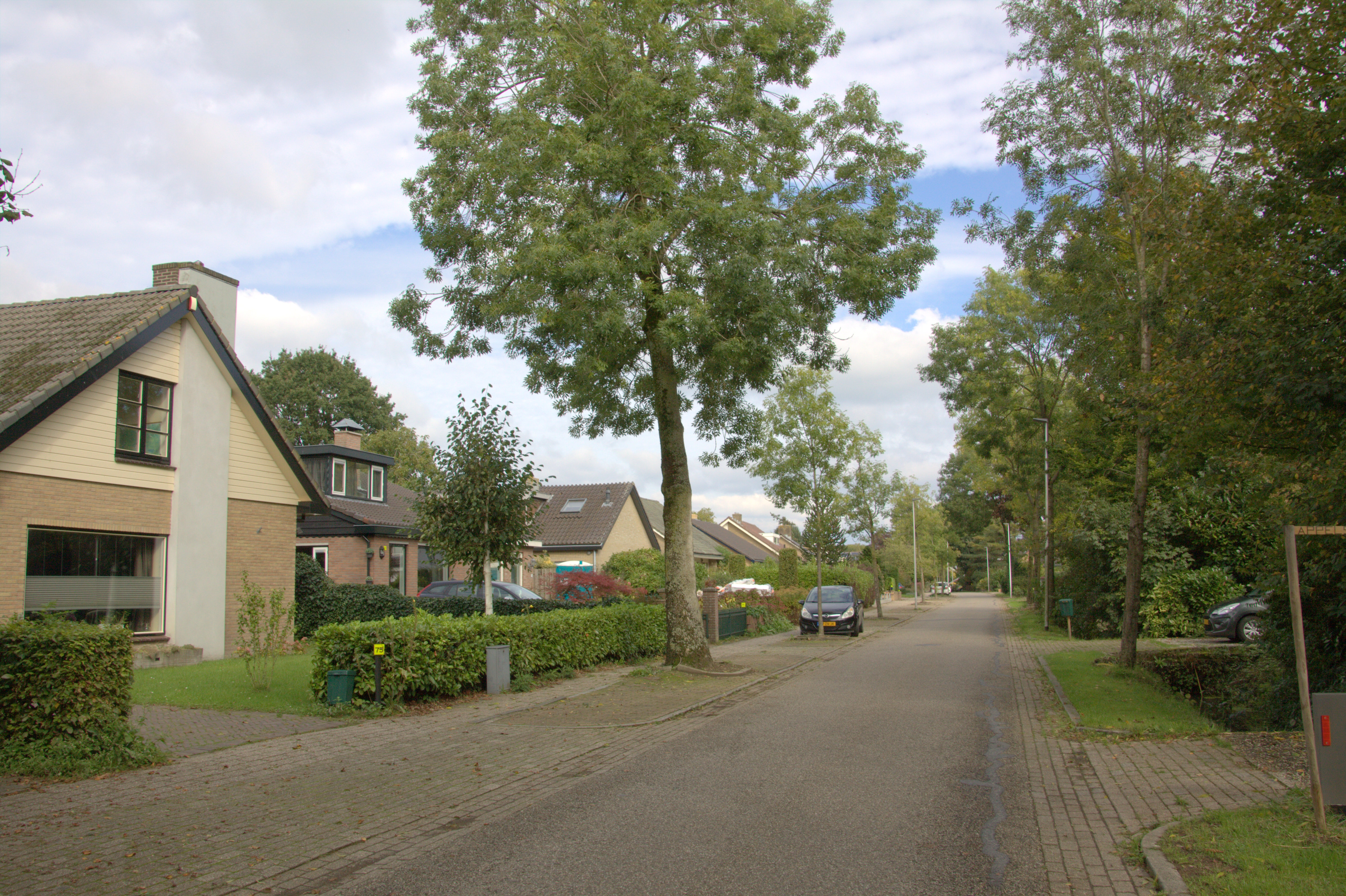
Street view
