= Guizhou Subdistrict =

Guizhou Subdistrict 归州街道
- Subdistrict
- Location in Liaoning
- Coordinates: 40°7′18″N 122°3′52″E
- Country: People's Republic of China
- Province: Liaoning
- Prefecture-level city: Yingkou
- County-level city: Gaizhou
- Time zone: UTC+8 (China Standard)

Guizhou Subdistrict (simplified Chinese: 归州街道; traditional Chinese: 歸州街道; pinyin: Guīzhōu Jiēdào) is a subdistrict in Gaizhou, Liaoning, China. As of 2020, it has 12 villages under its administration:

- Guizhou Village
- Huaishufang Village (槐树房村)
- Baishawan Village (白沙湾村)
- Yangshan Village (仰山村)
- Tuanpu Village (团朴村)
- Donggou Village (东沟村)
- Santaizi Village (三台子村)
- Longbozi Village (龙脖子村)
- Xi'ertaizi Village (西二台子村)
- Fangshen Village (房身村)
- Pozi Village (坡子村)
- Xianglanqi Village (厢兰旗村)

== See also ==
- List of township-level divisions of Liaoning
