= Guizhou, Hubei =

Guizhou 归州镇
- Town
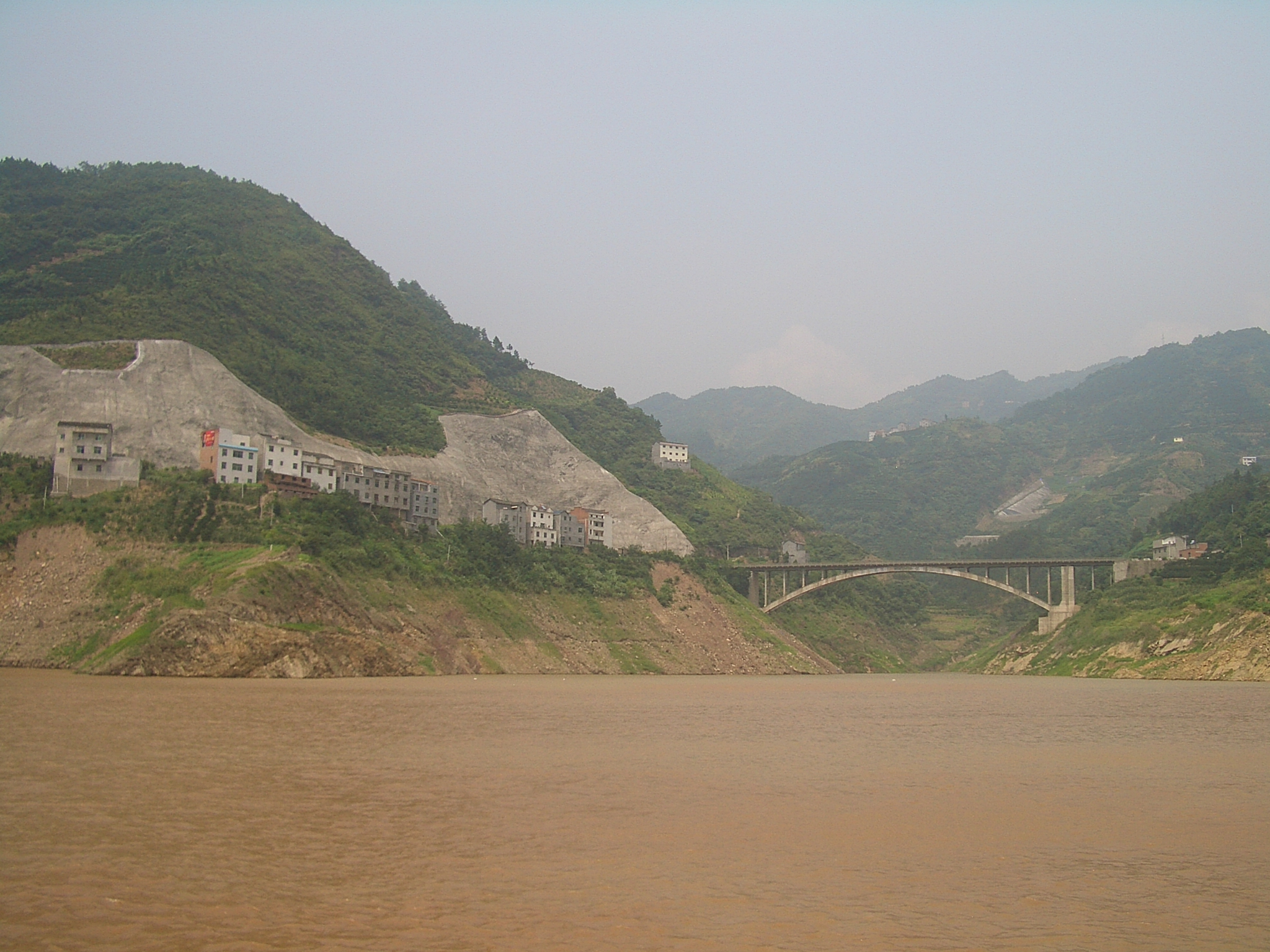
- Guizhou Town

- Location in Hubei
- Coordinates: 30°58′57″N 110°42′42″E
- Country: People's Republic of China
- Province: Hubei
- Prefecture-level city: Yichang
- County: Zigui County
- Time zone: UTC+8 (China Standard)

Guizhou (simplified Chinese: 归州; traditional Chinese: 歸州; pinyin: Guīzhōu) is a town under the administration of Zigui County, Hubei, China. As of 2020, it has one residential community and 11 villages under its administration.

== Administrative divisions ==
One residential community:

- Guizhou (归州社区)

Eleven villages:

- Pengjiapo (彭家坡村), Quyuanmiao (屈原庙村), Xiangjiawan (向家湾村), Xiangxi (香溪村), Xiangjiadian (向家店村), Zhoujiawan (周家湾村), Guanzhuangping (官庄坪村), Yanguan (盐关村), Wangusi (万古寺村), Baiguoyuan (白果圆村), Jiajiadian (贾家店村)
