= Zigui County =

Zigui County 秭归县 Tzekwei
- County
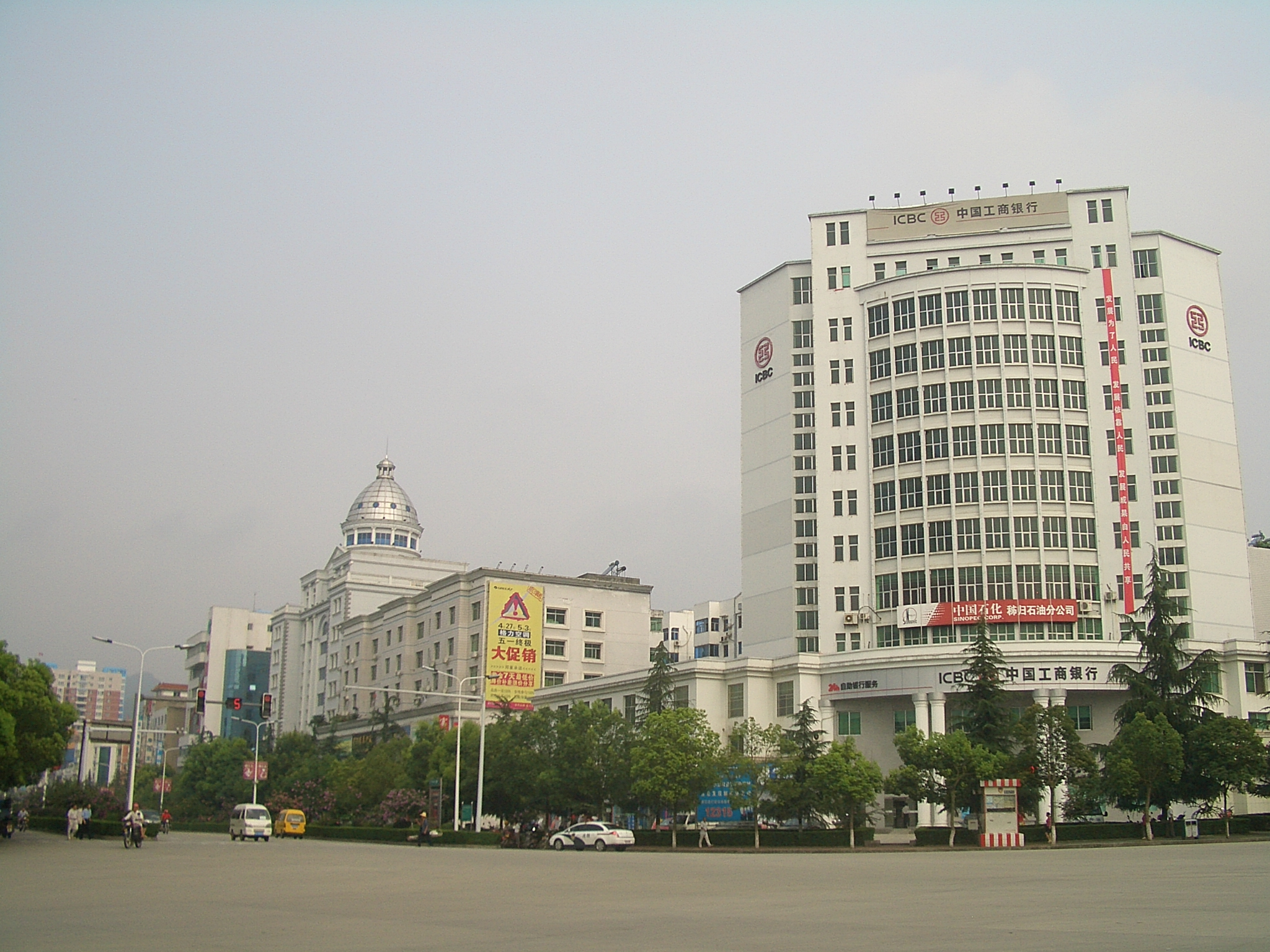
- Part of the town of Maoping, the county seat

- Location in Hubei
- Coordinates (Zigui government): 30°49′34″N 110°58′41″E
- Country: People's Republic of China
- Province: Hubei
- Prefecture-level city: Yichang

Area
  - Total: 2,427 km^{2} (937 sq mi)

Population (2020)
  - Total: 299,642
  - Density: 123.5/km^{2} (319.8/sq mi)
- Time zone: UTC+8 (China Standard)
- Website: www.zigui.gov.cn

Zigui County
- Traditional Chinese: 秭歸縣
- Simplified Chinese: 秭归县
Transcriptions
Standard Mandarin
- Hanyu Pinyin: Zǐguī Xiàn
- Wade–Giles: Tzu^{3}-kuei^{1} Hsien^{4}

Alternative Chinese name
- Traditional Chinese: 秭歸
- Simplified Chinese: 秭归
- Postal: Tzukwei
Transcriptions
Standard Mandarin
- Hanyu Pinyin: Zǐguī
- Wade–Giles: Tzu^{3}-kuei^{1}

Zigui County (simplified Chinese: 秭归县; traditional Chinese: 秭歸縣; pinyin: Zǐguī Xiàn) is a county of western Hubei province, People's Republic of China. It is under the administration of the prefecture-level city of Yichang and encompasses the easternmost portion of the Yangtze River Gorges, including the Xiling Gorge.

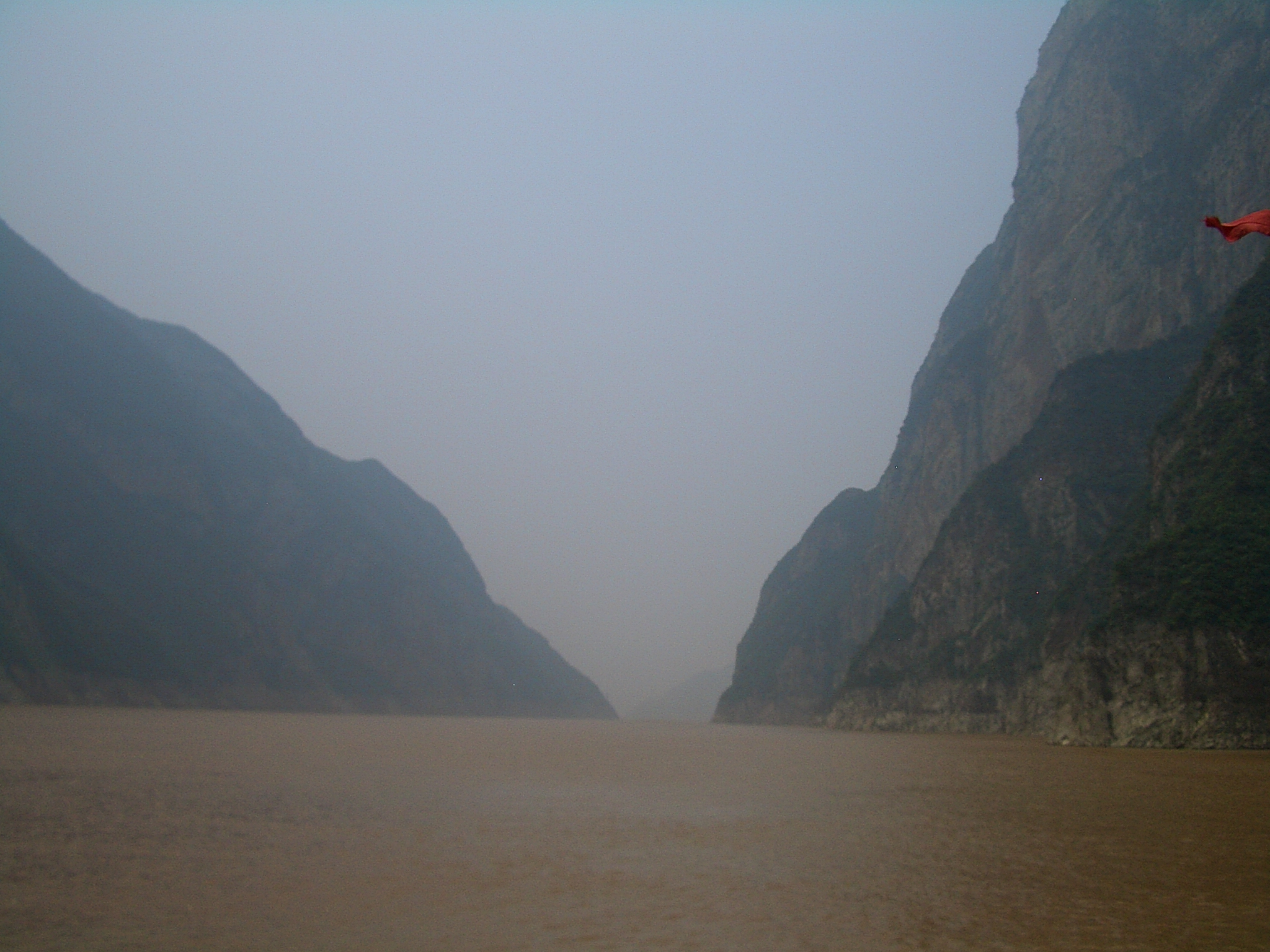
In the Xiling Gorge in the western part of Zigui County

The county seat of Zigui is now the town of Maoping (茅坪镇; Máopíng Zhèn), situated a few kilometers west of the Three Gorges Dam on the high southern shore of the river. The original Zigui town was upstream to the west and was abandoned and submerged under the rising waters of the reservoir in the early years of the 21st century. As it is common in China, Maoping is typically labelled as "Zigui County" (秭归县) or simply "Zigui" (秭归) on most maps.

== Administrative divisions ==
Eight towns:

- Maoping (茅坪镇), Guizhou (归州镇), Quyuan (屈原镇), Shazhenxi (沙镇溪镇), Lianghekou (两河口镇), Guojiaba (郭家坝镇), Yanglinqiao (杨林桥镇), Jiuwanxi (九畹溪镇)

Four townships:

- Shuitianba Township (水田坝乡), Xietan Township (泄滩乡), Meijiahe Township (梅家河乡), Moping Township (磨坪乡)

== Climate ==
Climate data for Zigui, elevation 296 m (971 ft), (1991–2020 normals, extremes 1991–present)
Month	Jan	Feb	Mar	Apr	May	Jun	Jul	Aug	Sep	Oct	Nov	Dec	Year
Record high °C (°F)	20.4 (68.7)	25.8 (78.4)	33.8 (92.8)	36.2 (97.2)	37.4 (99.3)	39.6 (103.3)	40.1 (104.2)	41.7 (107.1)	40.8 (105.4)	33.5 (92.3)	28.1 (82.6)	22.1 (71.8)	41.7 (107.1)
Mean daily maximum °C (°F)	8.7 (47.7)	11.6 (52.9)	17.3 (63.1)	23.1 (73.6)	26.7 (80.1)	30.0 (86.0)	32.3 (90.1)	31.8 (89.2)	27.5 (81.5)	22.1 (71.8)	16.6 (61.9)	10.9 (51.6)	21.5 (70.8)
Daily mean °C (°F)	5.0 (41.0)	7.4 (45.3)	11.9 (53.4)	17.3 (63.1)	21.3 (70.3)	24.9 (76.8)	27.0 (80.6)	26.5 (79.7)	22.8 (73.0)	17.6 (63.7)	12.4 (54.3)	7.1 (44.8)	16.8 (62.2)
Mean daily minimum °C (°F)	2.5 (36.5)	4.4 (39.9)	8.2 (46.8)	13.2 (55.8)	17.4 (63.3)	21.2 (70.2)	23.6 (74.5)	23.1 (73.6)	19.5 (67.1)	14.6 (58.3)	9.5 (49.1)	4.5 (40.1)	13.5 (56.3)
Record low °C (°F)	−4.8 (23.4)	−2.9 (26.8)	−1.1 (30.0)	2.1 (35.8)	10.7 (51.3)	16.1 (61.0)	17.3 (63.1)	16.4 (61.5)	10.8 (51.4)	5.9 (42.6)	0.4 (32.7)	−3.4 (25.9)	−4.8 (23.4)
Average precipitation mm (inches)	24.5 (0.96)	39.9 (1.57)	57.8 (2.28)	113.3 (4.46)	143.7 (5.66)	162.0 (6.38)	238.9 (9.41)	219.6 (8.65)	123.5 (4.86)	103.6 (4.08)	50.2 (1.98)	20.2 (0.80)	1,297.2 (51.09)
Average precipitation days (≥ 0.1 mm)	8.4	9.6	11.5	12.7	14.4	13.8	17.1	14.9	12.5	11.9	10.1	8.0	144.9
Average snowy days	4.0	2.3	0.3	0	0	0	0	0	0	0	0.2	1.3	8.1
Average relative humidity (%)	73	73	72	73	76	78	81	80	78	79	78	73	76
Mean monthly sunshine hours	79.8	81.1	121.9	145.0	148.7	144.9	169.6	181.3	125.4	111.3	105.7	90.7	1,505.4
Percentage possible sunshine	25	26	33	37	35	34	40	45	34	32	34	29	34
Source: China Meteorological Administration

== Tourism ==
A good view of the Three Gorges Dam, and of an ancillary dam further south, can be had from Maoping's riverside parks.

== Economy ==
Most of Zigui is hilly or mountainous with basic farming and tea production. There are many small coal mines in the mountains, with the coal trucked to the river then loaded onto barges for shipping downstream.

== Transportation ==
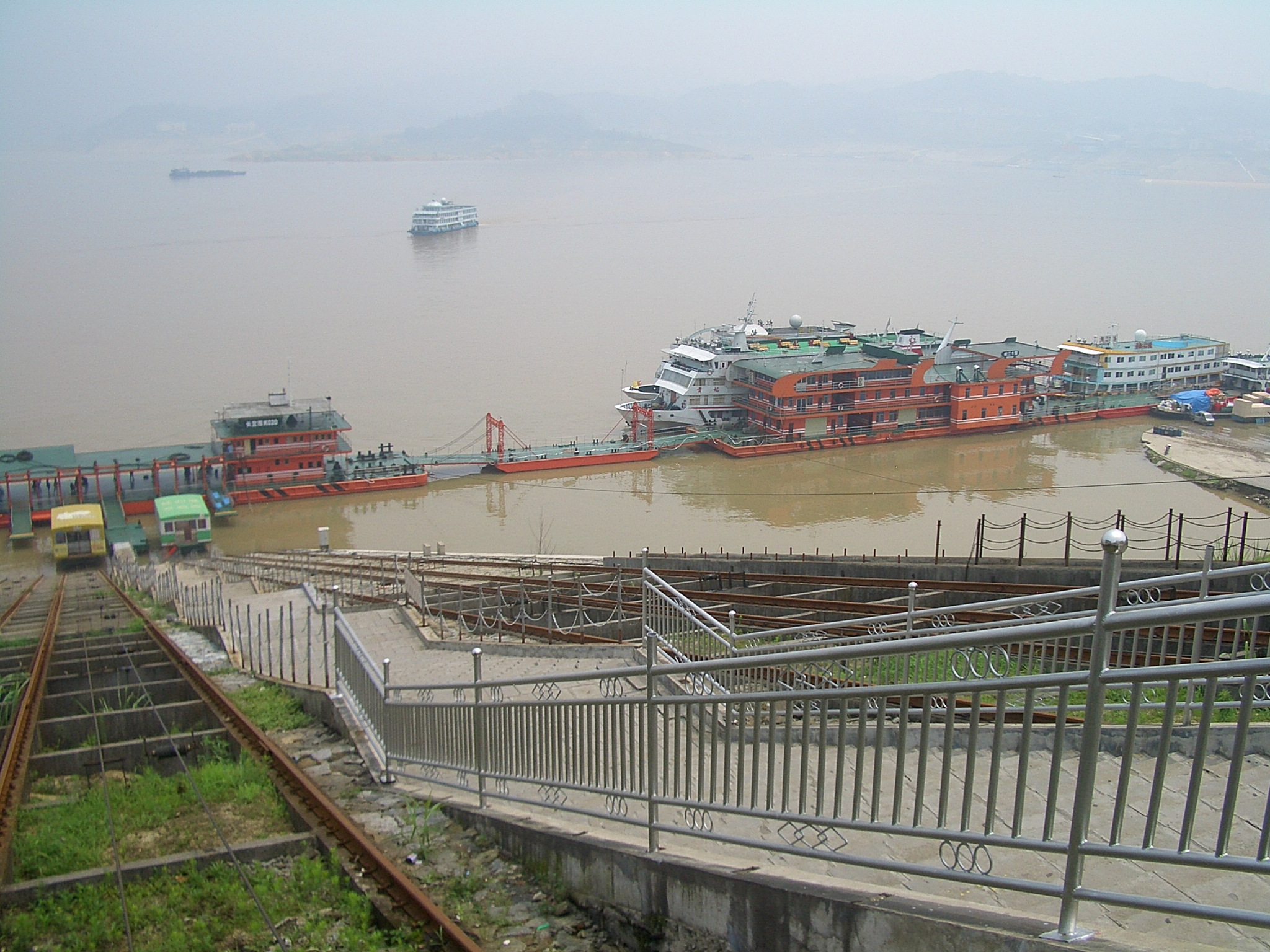
Funiculars take passengers down to the boats at the Maoping Town dock

Passenger boats and ferries travelling up and down the river can dock at the large passenger dock ("Zigui Harbor", 秭归港) at Maoping, or at Taipingxi Town on the north bank close to the Dam. Frequent bus service connects Maoping with the center city of Yichang to the east; there is also bus service to most towns in the county, as well as to the neighboring counties.
