= Guy =

Guy or GUY may refer to:

== Personal names ==
- Guy (given name)
- Guy (surname)
- That Guy (...), the New Zealand street performer Leigh Hart

== Places ==
- Guy, Alberta, a Canadian hamlet
- Guy, Arkansas, US, a city
- Guy, Indiana, US, an unincorporated community
- Guy, Kentucky, US, an unincorporated community
- Guy, Texas, US, an unincorporated community
- Guy Street, Montreal, Canada

== Arts and entertainment ==
=== Films ===
- Guy (1996 film), an American film starring Vincent D'Onofrio
- Guy (2018 film), a French film starring Alex Lutz

=== Music ===
- Guy (band), an American R&B group
  - Guy (Guy album), 1988
- Guy (Jayda G album), 2023
- "G.U.Y.", a 2014 song by Lady Gaga from the album Artpop

== Transport ==
- Guy (sailing), rope to control a spinnaker on a sailboat
- Air Guyane Express, ICAO code GUY
- Guy Motors, a former British bus and truck builder
- Guy (ship, 1933), see Boats of the Mackenzie River watershed
- Guy (ship, 1961), see Boats of the Mackenzie River watershed

== Other uses ==
- Guy (grape), the variety Gouais blanc
- The Guy, an effigy burned on Guy Fawkes Night
- The Guy, the mascot of the band Disturbed
- The Guy, a character from Spy Kids 3-D: Game Over
- The Guy, a title of power in I Wanna Be the Guy
- Slang term for a man
- Guyana, country code GUY
- Guy-wire (or guy-rope), a tensioned cable (or rope) designed to add stability to a free-standing structure.
- Saint Guy (disambiguation)

== See also ==
- Gal (disambiguation)
- Gi (disambiguation)
- Giy (disambiguation)
- Gui (disambiguation)
- Guys (disambiguation)
- Gy (disambiguation)
