= GOI =

GoI most commonely refers to the Government of India.

Goi or GOI may refer to:

== Government ==
- Government of India
- Government of Indonesia
- Government of Iran
- Government of Iraq
- Government of Israel
- Government of Italy
- Goi Domain, in feudal Japan

== People ==
- Goi of Baekje (died 286), King of Baekje

=== Surname ===
- Dero Goi (born 1970), German musician
- Ivan Goi (born 1980), Italian motorcycle racer
- Michael Goi (born 1959), American director and cinematographer
- Sam Goi (born 1949), Singaporean businessman
- Tommaso Goi (born 1990), Italian ice hockey player
- Wake Goi (born 1968), Papua New Guinean politician

== Other uses ==
- Goi (grape), a French wine grape
- Gỏi, a Vietnamese salad
- Goi Station, in Ichihara, Chiba, Japan
- Goa International Airport, India
- Grand Orient of Italy, a masonic organization
- Institute GOI (Goi-mailako Online Institutua), centre attached to the University of the Basque Country (UPV/EHU) created by UEU to promote online university studies.
- Getting Over It with Bennett Foddy, a video game
- A Grammar of Old Irish, a translation and edition by Osborn Bergin and D. A. Binchy of a book by Rudolf Thurneysen detailing the grammar of the Old Irish language
- Gruppo Operativo Incursori - Italian Navy special forces unit

== See also ==
- Goy (disambiguation)
- Goia (disambiguation)
- Goin (disambiguation)
- Gois (disambiguation)
