= Gaizhou =

Gaizhou 盖州市
- County-level city
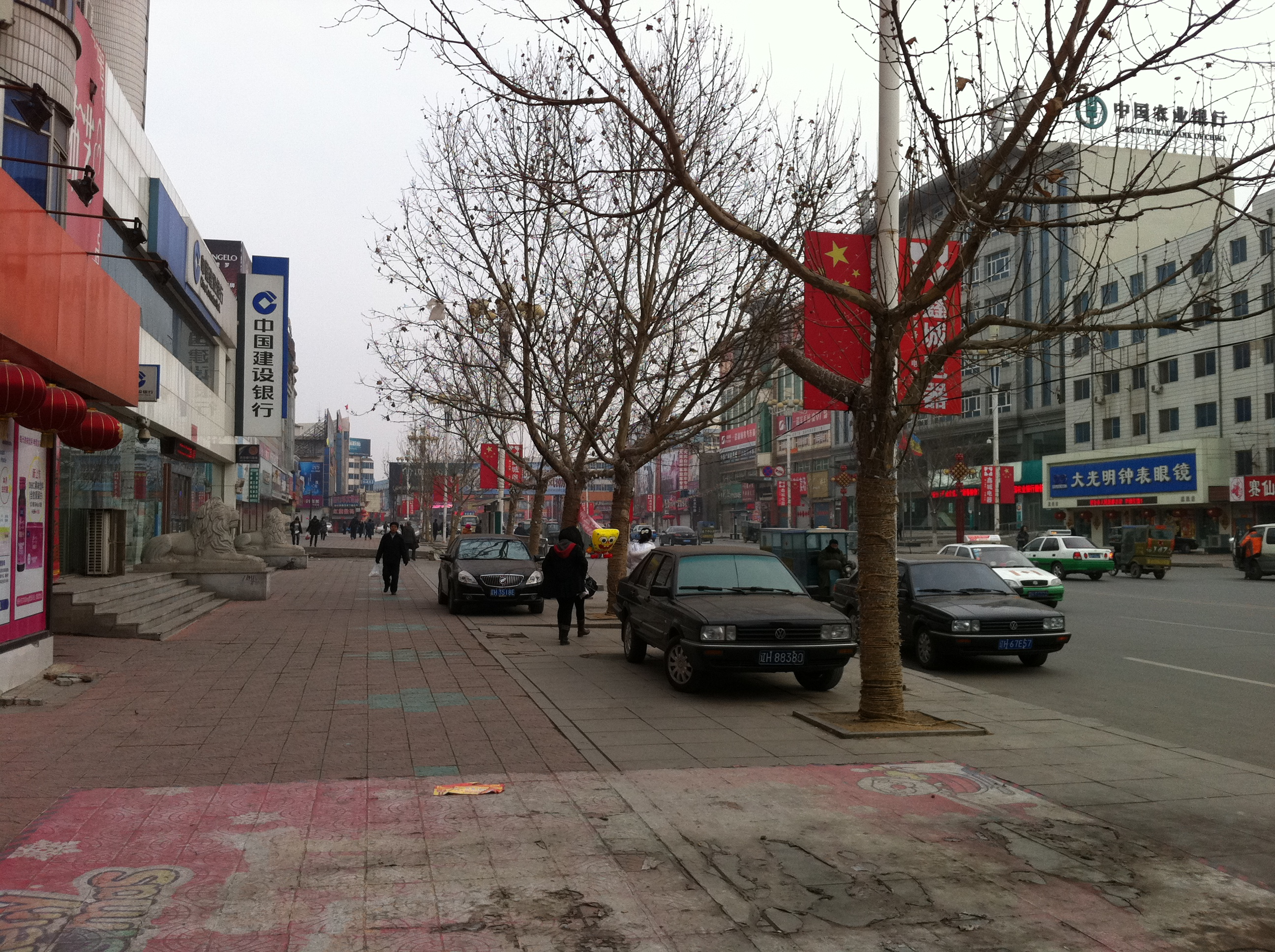

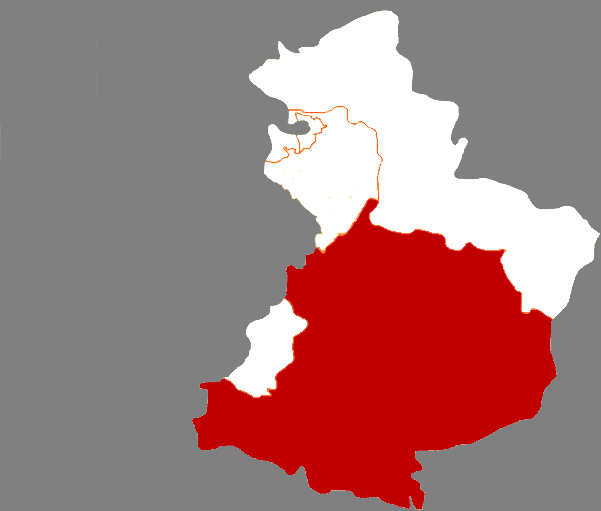
- Location in Yingkou

- Location in Liaoning
- Coordinates: 40°24′N 122°21′E
- Country: People's Republic of China
- Province: Liaoning
- Prefecture-level city: Yingkou

Area
  - County-level city: 2,930.0 km^{2} (1,131.3 sq mi)
  - Urban: 150.00 km^{2} (57.92 sq mi)
- Elevation: 9.1 m (30 ft)

Population (2020 census)
  - County-level city: 559,271
  - Density: 190.88/km^{2} (494.37/sq mi)
  - Urban: 228,059
- Time zone: UTC+8 (China Standard)

Gaizhou
- Traditional Chinese: 蓋州
- Simplified Chinese: 盖州
- Postal: Kaichow; Kaihsien (1965–1992); Kaiping (until 1965)
Transcriptions
Standard Mandarin
- Hanyu Pinyin: Gàizhōu
- Wade–Giles: Kai^{4}-chou^{1}

Gaixian
- Traditional Chinese: 蓋縣
- Simplified Chinese: 盖县
- Postal: Kaihsien
Transcriptions
Standard Mandarin
- Hanyu Pinyin: Gàixiàn
- Wade–Giles: Kai^{4}-hsien^{4}

Gaiping
- Traditional Chinese: 蓋平
- Simplified Chinese: 盖平
- Postal: Kaiping
Transcriptions
Standard Mandarin
- Hanyu Pinyin: Gàipíng
- Wade–Giles: Kai^{4}-ping^{2}

Gaizhou (simplified Chinese: 盖州; traditional Chinese: 蓋州; pinyin: Gàizhōu), formerly Gaixian, Gaiping, and Kaiping, is a county-level city in Liaoning province, China. It is under the administration of Yingkou City, which lies 31 km (19 mi) to the north-northwest, and is located at the northwest end of the Liaodong Peninsula near the northeast coast of the Bohai Sea.

== Administrative divisions ==
There are six subdistricts, 18 towns, and three townships under the city's administration.

Subdistricts:

- Gulou Subdistrict (鼓楼街道), Xicheng Subdistrict (西城街道), Dongcheng Subdistrict (东城街道), Taiyangsheng Subdistrict (太阳升街道), Tuanshan Subdistrict (团山街道), Xihai Subdistrict (西海街道)

Towns:

- Gaotun (高屯镇), Shagang (沙岗镇), Jiulongdi (九垄地镇), Jiuzhai (九寨镇), Wanfu (万福镇), Wolongquan (卧龙泉镇), Qingshiling (青石岭镇), Nuanquan (暖泉镇), Guizhou (归州镇), Bangshibu (榜式堡镇), Tuandian (团甸镇), Shuangtai (双台镇), Yangyun (杨运镇), Xutun (徐屯镇), Shizijie (什字街镇), Kuangdonggou (矿洞沟镇), Chentun (陈屯镇), Liangtun (梁屯镇),

Townships:

- Xiaoshipeng Township (小石棚乡), Guoyuan Township (果园乡), Ertai Township (二台乡)

== Climate ==
Climate data for Gaizhou, elevation 25 m (82 ft), (1991–2020 normals, extremes 1981–2025)
Month	Jan	Feb	Mar	Apr	May	Jun	Jul	Aug	Sep	Oct	Nov	Dec	Year
Record high °C (°F)	9.9 (49.8)	19.0 (66.2)	25.5 (77.9)	29.8 (85.6)	34.7 (94.5)	36.6 (97.9)	36.8 (98.2)	36.1 (97.0)	33.3 (91.9)	27.7 (81.9)	21.5 (70.7)	16.2 (61.2)	36.8 (98.2)
Mean daily maximum °C (°F)	−2.5 (27.5)	1.6 (34.9)	8.5 (47.3)	17.0 (62.6)	23.5 (74.3)	27.3 (81.1)	29.6 (85.3)	29.1 (84.4)	24.9 (76.8)	17.4 (63.3)	7.9 (46.2)	0.3 (32.5)	15.4 (59.7)
Daily mean °C (°F)	−7.8 (18.0)	−3.6 (25.5)	3.3 (37.9)	11.7 (53.1)	18.3 (64.9)	22.7 (72.9)	25.5 (77.9)	24.8 (76.6)	19.5 (67.1)	11.7 (53.1)	2.7 (36.9)	−4.9 (23.2)	10.3 (50.6)
Mean daily minimum °C (°F)	−12.2 (10.0)	−8.2 (17.2)	−1.4 (29.5)	6.5 (43.7)	13.0 (55.4)	18.1 (64.6)	21.8 (71.2)	20.8 (69.4)	14.5 (58.1)	6.7 (44.1)	−1.9 (28.6)	−9.2 (15.4)	5.7 (42.3)
Record low °C (°F)	−28.2 (−18.8)	−22.0 (−7.6)	−13.3 (8.1)	−7.1 (19.2)	2.5 (36.5)	8.1 (46.6)	14.9 (58.8)	9.5 (49.1)	2.9 (37.2)	−6.4 (20.5)	−16.5 (2.3)	−23.2 (−9.8)	−28.2 (−18.8)
Average precipitation mm (inches)	3.8 (0.15)	7.3 (0.29)	11.4 (0.45)	33.3 (1.31)	54.9 (2.16)	72.3 (2.85)	141.2 (5.56)	165.2 (6.50)	50.4 (1.98)	35.5 (1.40)	20.6 (0.81)	8.9 (0.35)	604.8 (23.81)
Average precipitation days (≥ 0.1 mm)	2.6	2.8	3.7	6.0	7.5	9.0	11.1	10.0	6.4	6.3	4.9	3.5	73.8
Average snowy days	4.0	3.5	2.8	0.6	0	0	0	0	0	0.2	3.1	4.2	18.4
Average relative humidity (%)	57	53	50	49	54	65	75	77	69	63	60	59	61
Mean monthly sunshine hours	189.0	190.6	229.9	236.1	266.4	230.2	202.8	212.6	228.1	212.6	171.4	170.8	2,540.5
Percentage possible sunshine	63	63	62	59	60	51	45	51	62	62	58	59	58
Source: China Meteorological Administration
