= Goin =

Goin may refer to:

- Goin (grape) or Gouais blanc, a grape variety
- Goin, Moselle, France
- Suzanne Goin, American chef and restaurateur

== See also ==
- Goins (surname)
- Góinn, one of the serpents beneath Yggdrasil in Norse mythology
