= Gui Mallon =

Brazilian composer, guitarist and writer

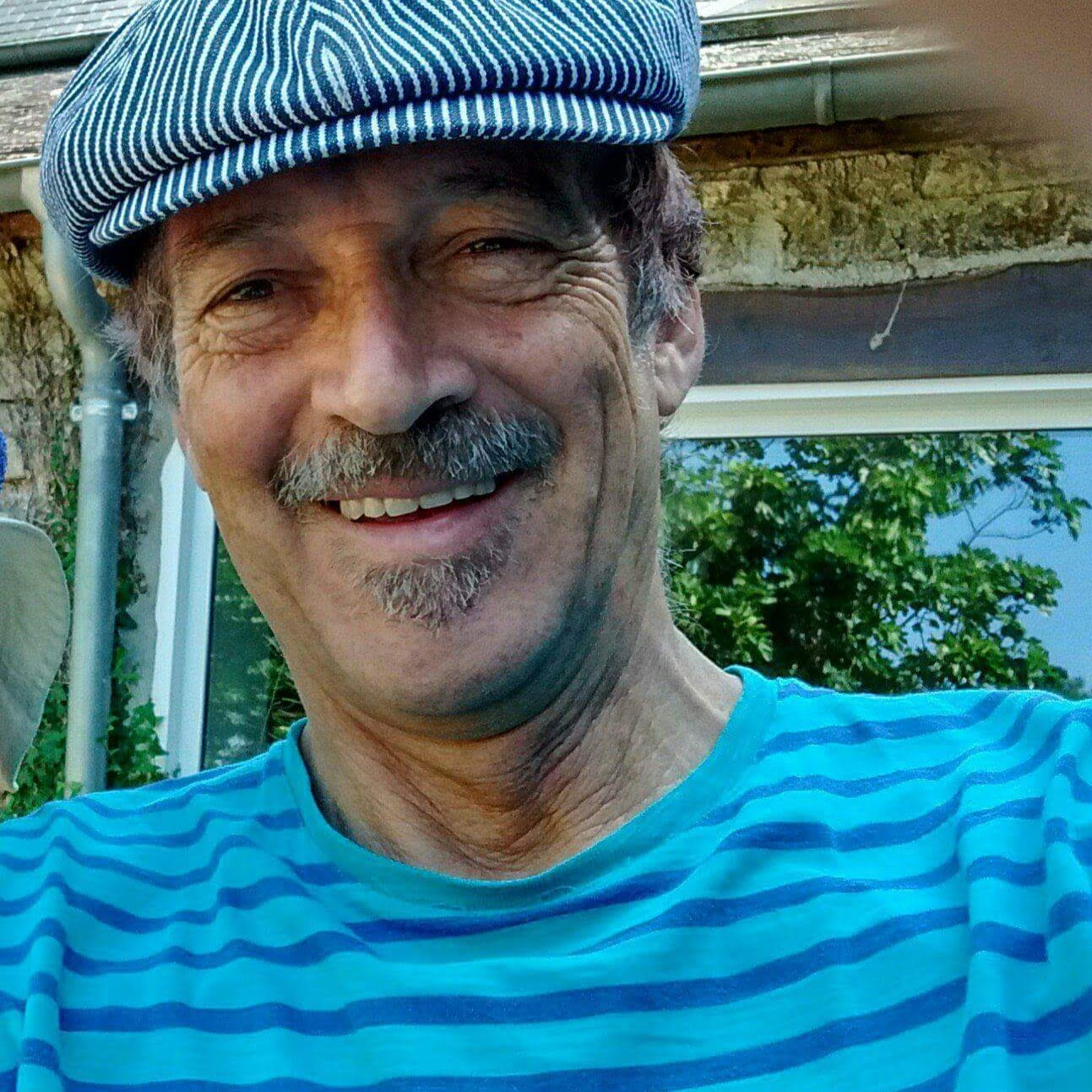
Gui Mallon, composer and guitarist, in Sweden 2018.

Guilherme A.B. Mallon (Gui Mallon) is a Brazilian composer, guitarist and writer.

Mallon was born in Rio de Janeiro, and studied music theory and harmony at the CBM-Brazilian Conservatory of Music in Rio de Janeiro. He also studied composition and conducting with Alceu Bochino and Guerra Peixe, at the Villa-Lobos School of Music in Rio de Janeiro. In 1983 he moved to the United States, where he lived in New York from 1983 to 1989. In 1990 he moved to Europe, settling down in Madrid, Spain and then finally in Sweden (1992). In Europe he formed different groups to perform his compositions and arrangements in various styles: contemporary, world, folk music, jazz and classical.

Attempting to expand the chamber music and classical guitar repertoires, Gui Mallon has written extensively for a trio formed by his guitar, a bass instrument (usually violoncello or bass) and a solo instrument (flute, violin, sax, oboe, etc.). His Gui Mallon Ensemble, a band formed of a string quintet, 3 percussionists, sax, flute and guitar, performed two concerts at Montreux Jazz Festival. These concerts were recorded live and released in the US and Canada by the American record company Adventure Music (Live at Montreux - 2004) receiving expressive reviews from the specialized American press.

In 2004 he wrote the music for the exhibition and poetry concerts during Timmarna & Tingen, a celebration of the centenary of Rainer Maria Rilke's journey to Jonsered in Sweden. Gui Mallon has also composed a concert for guitar & string orchestra in four movements entitled Ave Eva. Its first performance was with Oscar Fredrik Sinfonietta at Oscar Fredriks Church in November 2006.

Kompositioner, a book with 19 compositions, scores and essays, written in Swedish, was released by the publishing company - Edition Diadorim in 2005. Among his musical works on CD are albums with original compositions and arrangements such as Guitar (1996), Brazil, Brasil (1997), Twelve piece for no particular year (1999), Paradise Street (2001) and Live at Montreux (Adventure Music, 2004)

Gui Mallon has also written scores for the movies: En liten film för mina systrar by Åsa Sjöström, Grodan by Cecilia Torquato. In 2011 he wrote music for the Brazilian movie A Florista do Outro Lado da Praça. As a writer he was awarded the Brazilian poetry prize: Prêmio de Poesia Augusto dos Anjos in 2005.

His poetry collection A Caravela was published in Brazil 2012 and the Swedish translation Karavellen was published in 2013 by Diadorim Arts. His theatre play Kungsgatan was published in 2017. Staten som konstnär a collection of essays about art and cultural politics was published in 2018. He has also written two children's books in Swedish: Tingen som styrde vinden, 2005, and Det stora äventyret, 2008.

His artistic works include videos and paintings. In 2002 Gui Mallon participated in the exhibition Sweden Recreated at Konsthallen, Gothenburg (Museum of Art of Gothenburg).

Gui Mallon has worked extensively with music and art in community art projects, for example as an artist in residence in Genklang Vara 2006-2008.

In 2008, he received the Prêmio Interações Estéticas of FUNARTE - Brazilian Art Foundation for the project Mosartes, for the artistic and democratic interaction among children and teenagers from low income areas in Nova Friburgo, Brazil.

In 2012, Gui Mallon was granted the Prêmio Funarte Centenário de Luiz Gonzaga, the Brazilian Art Foundation folk music award to create his musical tribute Gonzaguianas to the folk musician Luiz Gonzaga.

== Sources ==
- JazzTimes: Gui Mallon: Live at Montreux
- AllMusic: https://www.allmusic.com/album/r714064
- Det stora äventyret - Tora Gardner : ISBN 978-91-975036-9-3
- Gui Mallon: Kompositioner (2005) ISBN 91-975036-4-9
- Timmarna och Tingen - Gothenburg University : Timmarna och tingen
- Svenska Dagbladet (in Swedish): Spirituellt i strålande kompositioner
- Gui Mallon & TIS
