= Goy (surname) =

Goy is a surname. Notable people with the name include:

- Doris Alma Goy (1912–1999), Australian botanist
- Luba Goy (born 1945), a Canadian actress and comedian
- Peter Goy (1938–2021), a former professional footballer
- Philippe Goy (born 1941), a French science fiction writer
- Sylvie Goy-Chavent (born 1963), a French politician and a member of the Senate of France
