= Saint Guy =

Saint Guy may refer to:

- Saint Vitus, Sicilian saint
- Guy of Anderlecht, a Belgian saint
- Saint-Guy, Quebec, a sector of the city of Lac-des-Aigles in Canada
