= 't Goy =

- Village
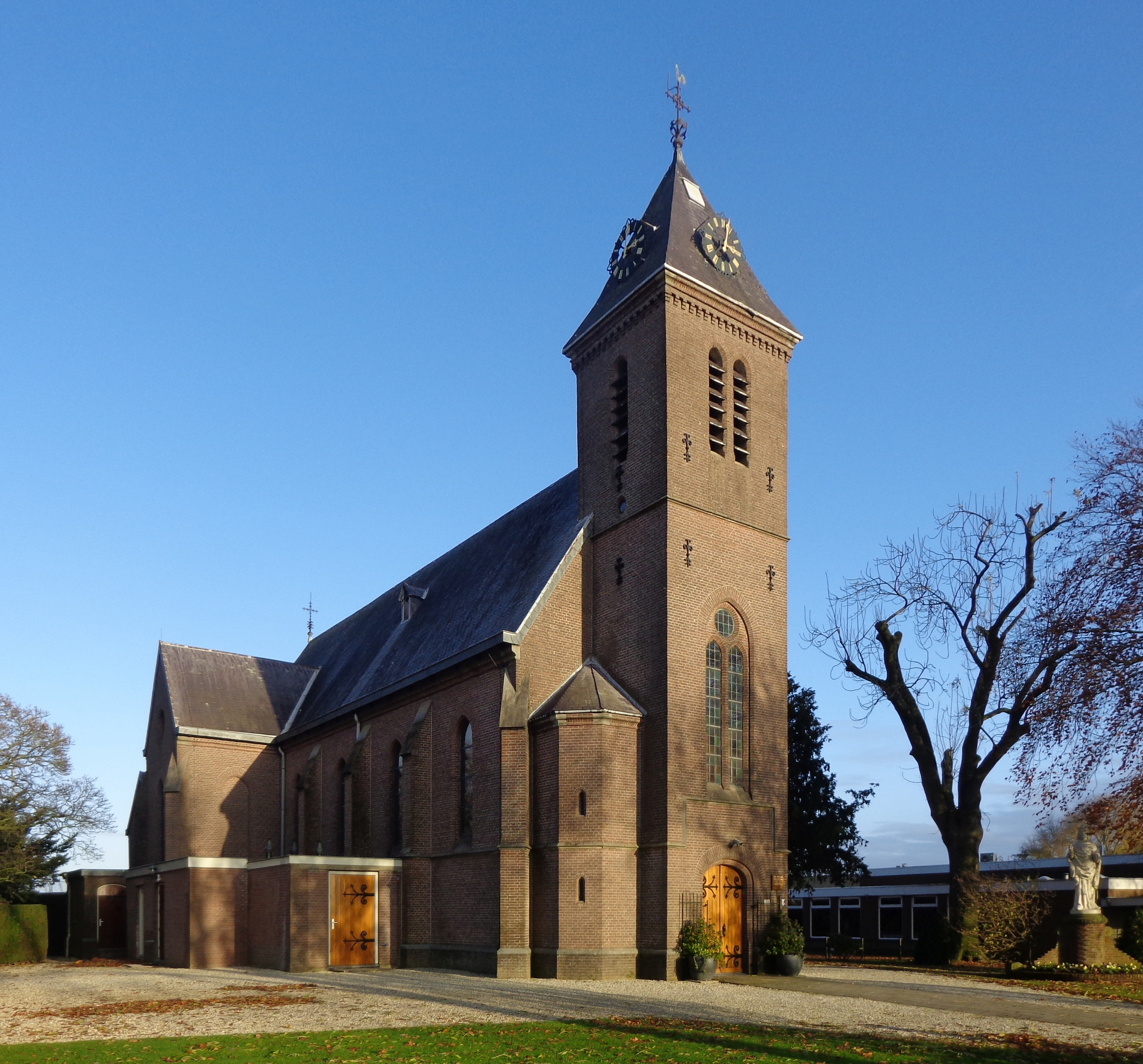
- Church of 't Goy

- Location in the Netherlands 't Goy (Netherlands) 't Goy (Europe)
- Coordinates: 52°0′8″N 5°13′22″E
- Country: Netherlands
- Province: Utrecht
- Municipality: Houten

Area
  - Total: 6.63 km^{2} (2.56 sq mi)
- Elevation: 3 m (9.8 ft)

Population (2021)
  - Total: 535
  - Density: 80.7/km^{2} (209/sq mi)
- Time zone: UTC+1 (CET)
  - Summer (DST): UTC+2 (CEST)
- Postal code: 3997
- Dialing code: 030

't Goy is a village in the Dutch province of Utrecht. It is a part of the municipality of Houten, and lies about 5 kilometres (3.1 mi) southeast of Houten.

== History ==
It was first mentioned in the 10th century as Upgoa, and means "upper settlement" maybe to distinguish from Het Gooi. 't Goy was an old settlement around a church which was demolished in 1800. Castle Ten Goye was located nearby.

The earliest history of the Castle Ten Goye is unknown. It was first mentioned in 1259, but was a lot older. In 1317, it was besieged by Guy of Avesnes, the Prince-Bishop of Utrecht. Guy took the castle, but died shortly after, and the van Goy family recaptured the castle. Between 1353 and 1355, there was a war between Prince-bishop of Utrecht and the Count of Holland. Ten Goye sided with Holland, and the castle was severely damaged during fighting. In 1356, peace was declared and Utrecht helped finance the rebuilding of the castle. In 1493, the castle is mentioned for the last time and disappeared. In 1970s, parts of the wall were rediscovered.

In 1840, 't Goy was home to 274 people. The Roman Catholic church was built between 1870 and 1871.

== Gallery ==
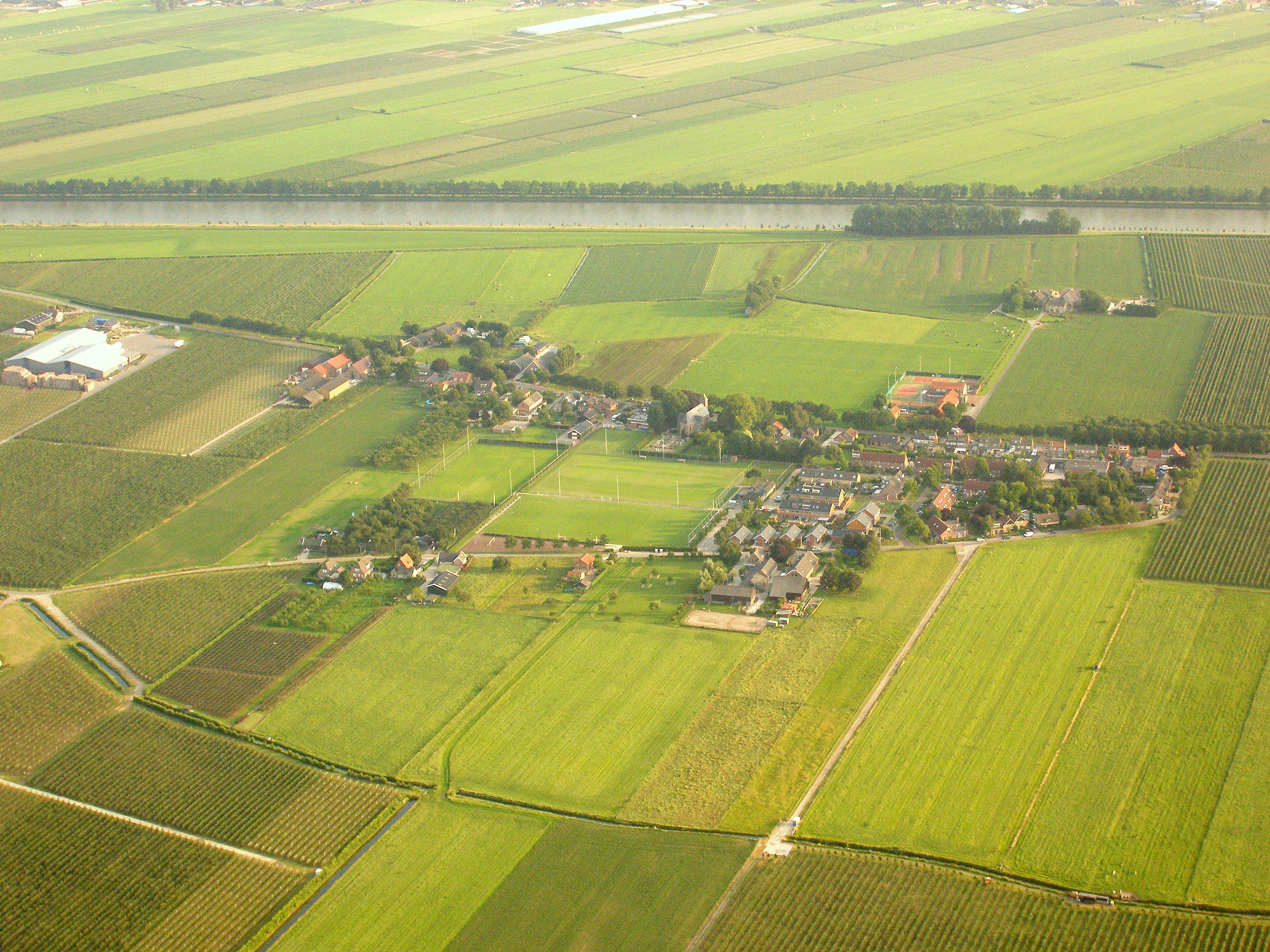
't Goy from the air

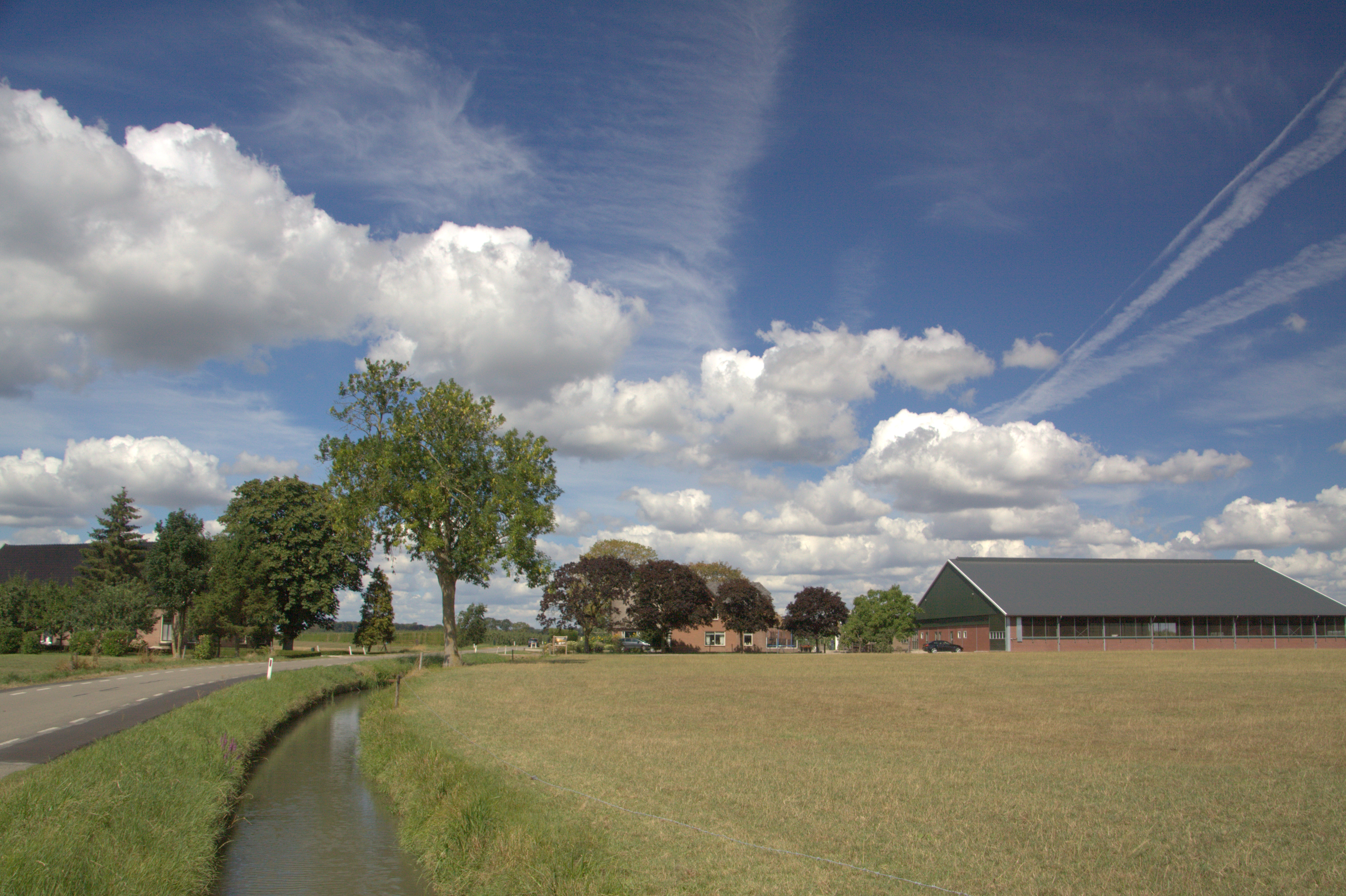
View of the 't Goy

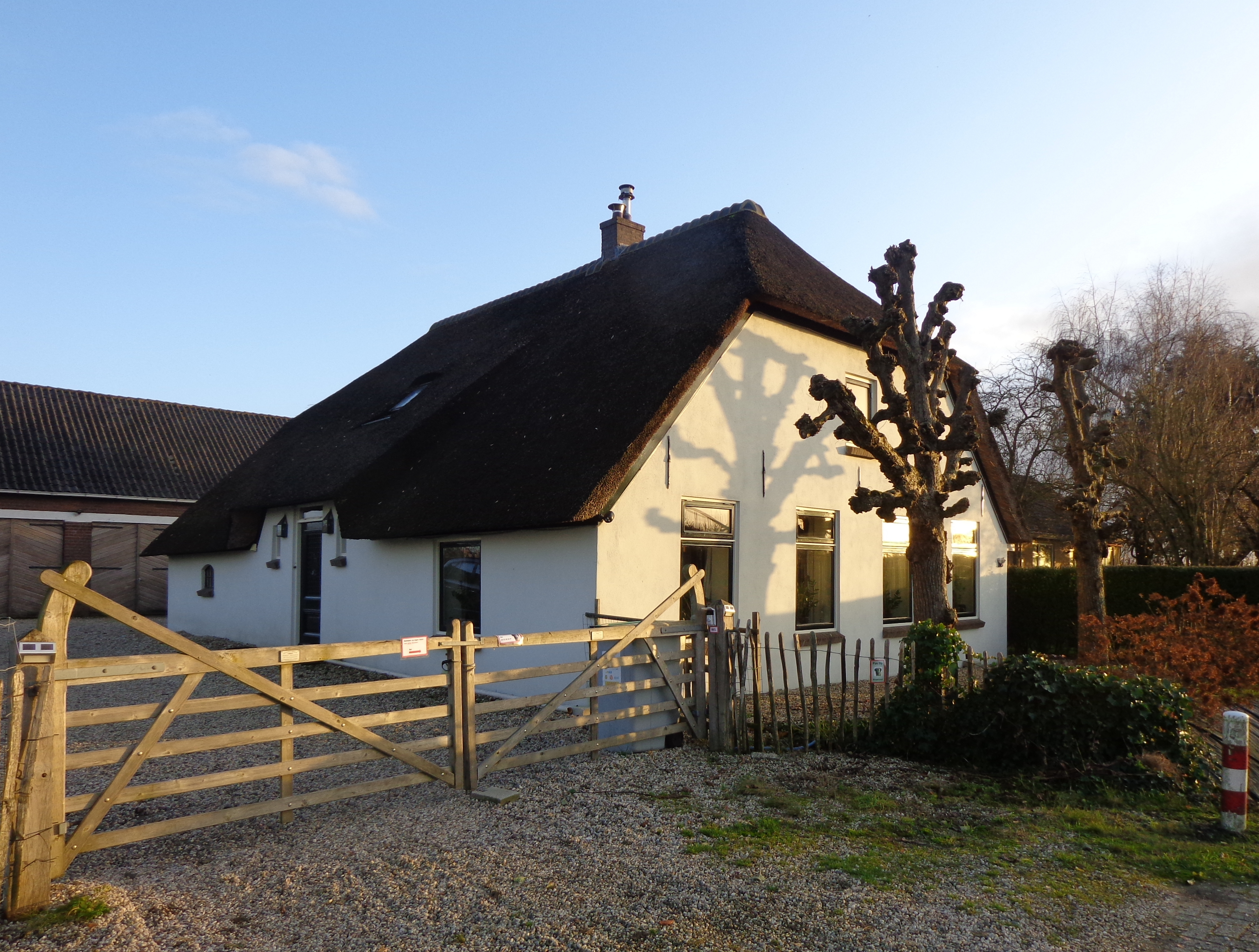
Farm of the 't Goy

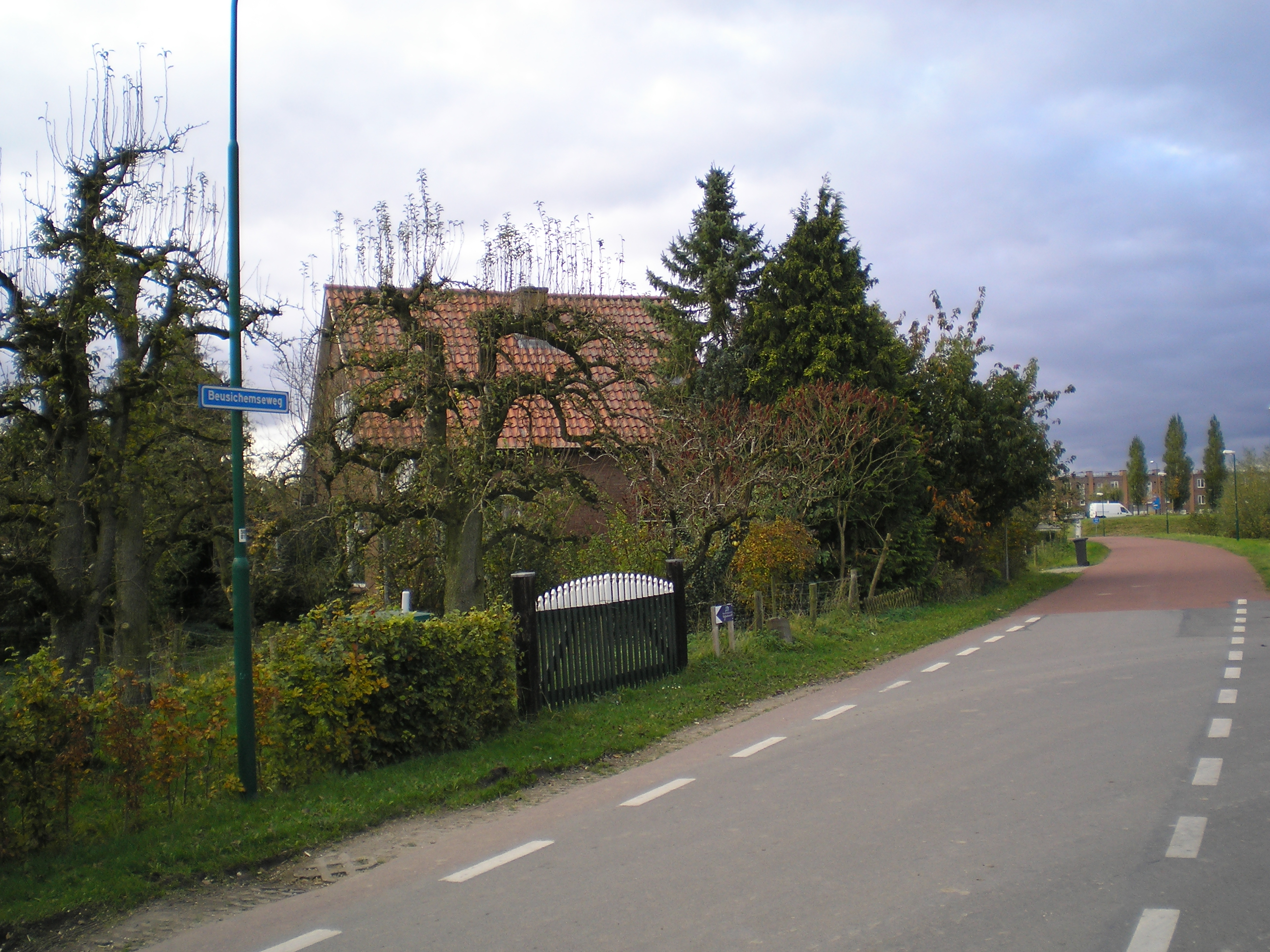
Street view
