= Town (China) =

Town (Zhen)

Chinese name
- Simplified Chinese: 镇
- Traditional Chinese: 鎮
Transcriptions
Standard Mandarin
- Hanyu Pinyin: Zhèn
other Mandarin
- Xiao'erjing: جٍـ

Tibetan name
- Tibetan: གྲོང་རྡལ།
Transcriptions
- Wylie: drong del
- Tibetan Pinyin: Chongdai

Zhuang name
- Zhuang: Cin

Korean name
- Hangul: 진
Transcriptions
- Revised Romanization: jin
- McCune–Reischauer: chin

Mongolian name
- Mongolian Cyrillic: балгас
- Mongolian script: ᠪᠠᠯᠭᠠᠰᠤ
Transcriptions
- SASM/GNC: balɣasu

Uyghur name
- Uyghur: بازارلىق
Transcriptions
- Latin Yëziqi: Bazarliq

Manchu name
- Manchu script: ᡴᠠᡩᠠᠯᠠᠩᡤᠠ
- Möllendorff: kadalaŋga

Kazakh name
- Kazakh: قالاشىق қалашық qalaşyq

Kyrgyz name
- Kyrgyz: شاارچا шаарча şaarça

Daur name
- Daur: giaabn

Oroqen name
- Oroqen: ajil

When referring to political divisions of China, town is the standard English translation of the Chinese 镇 (traditional: 鎮; pinyin: zhèn; Wade–Giles: chen^{4}). The Constitution of China classifies towns as fourth-level administrative units, along with, for example, townships (Chinese: 乡; pinyin: xiāng). A township is typically smaller in population and more remote than a town.

Similar to higher-level administrative units, the borders of a town would typically include an urban core (a small town with the population on the order of 10,000 people), as well as a rural area with some villages (村; cūn, or 庄; zhuāng).

== Map representation ==
A typical provincial map would merely show a town as a circle centered at its urban area and labeled with its name, while a more detailed one (e.g., a map of a single county-level division) would also show the borders dividing the county or county-level city into towns (镇) and/or townships (乡) and subdistricts (街道).

The town in which the county-level government, and usually the division's main urban area, are located is often not marked on less-detailed maps, because its location is usually labeled with the name of the county-level division rather than the name of the actual town into which this urban area falls. For example, the county government of Tongshan County is located in Tongyang Town (通羊镇; Tōngyáng zhèn), but maps would normally show it with a circle labeled "Tongshan County" (通山县) or simply "Tongshan" (通山). Road signs would also normally show the distance to "Tongshan" rather than "Tongyang".

On the other hand, more detailed maps—e.g., maps of individual prefecture-level cities in a provincial atlas—would label the county-seat location with both the name of the county (e.g., 通山县; Tōngshān xiàn) and, below it and in a smaller font, the name of the township (e.g., 通羊镇; Tōngyáng zhèn).

Intercity buses, trains, or riverboats destined for or stopping at a county seat may designate their destination either by the name of the county or the name of the county-seat township.

== Usage of zhen in Taiwan ==
In contrast to the PRC, in the official translation adopted in the ROC, both the characters "鄉" (pinyin: xiāng) and "鎮" (zhèn) are translated as "townships", with zhèn specifically being "urban" township, 'with xiāng specifically translated as "rural" township

== Gallery ==
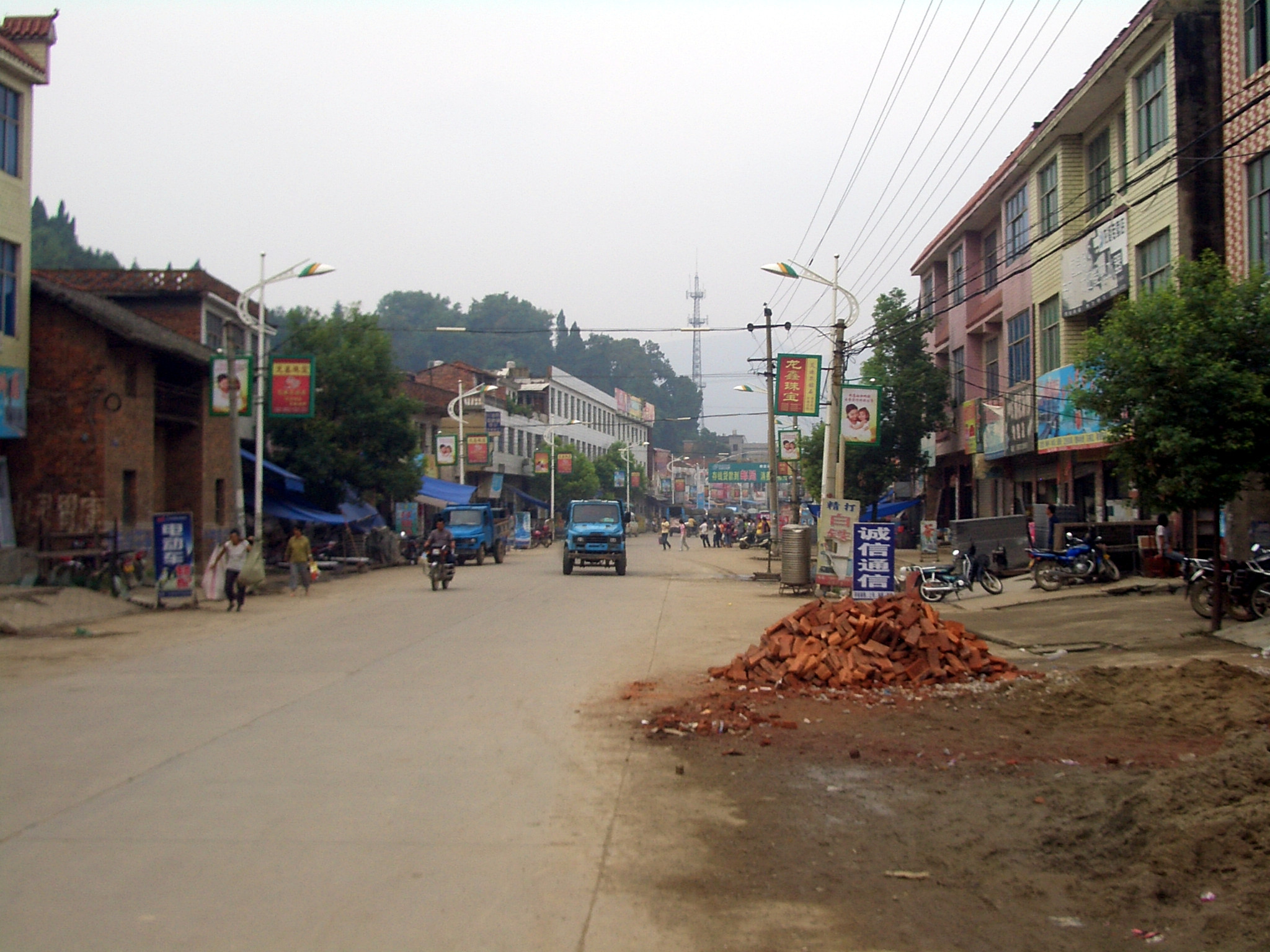
In the central urban area of Longgang Town (龙港镇; Lónggǎng Zhèn), a typical town of Yangxin County, Hubei

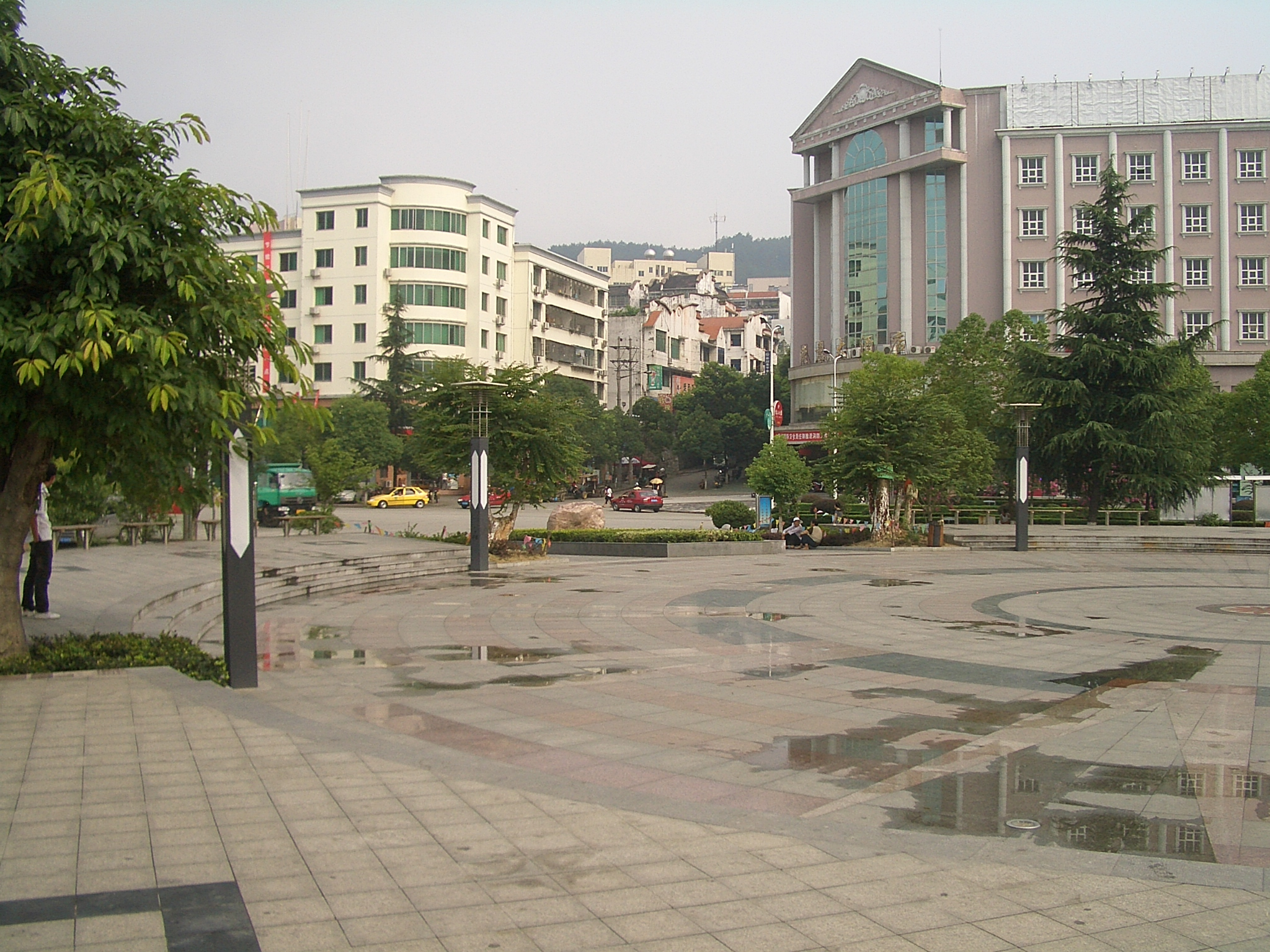
Maoping Town, the county seat of Zigui County, is often labeled "Zigui" on less-detailed maps
