= GIY Ireland =

Grow It Yourself Ireland (better known as GIY) is a non-profit social enterprise based in Ireland whose mission: "...is to educate and enable a global movement of food growers whose collective actions will help to rebuild a sustainable food system."

== History ==
GIY was founded by journalist and author Michael Kelly in 2008.

Early in 2009, Kelly with the aid of some of his fellow growers in the Waterford area, decided to set up GIY Ireland, with the aim of opening a GIY group in every town in Ireland. There are now over 80 active local GIY groups in Ireland, and five groups based in Australia.

== Activities ==
GIY is guided by five principles, referred to as 'Our GIY Goals' which are: eat more plants, end food waste, support small producers, stop food pollution, and connect with nature.

GIY engages in various activities, these include running campaigns, such as the 'Get Ireland Growing' campaign, which aims "to sow the seed of community food growing." GIY also runs various programmes, involving working with schools and attempting to reduce food waste. GIY also engages in philanthropy and also works with business' and corporations, via the GROWCircle Corporate Engagement Programme.

GIY also facilitates and supports various local growing groups, called GIY Groups, as a part of their community action.

== Partners ==
GIY is partnered with various companies and agencies to help achieve its goals. Notable partners include Department of Climate, Energy and the Environment, Innocent, Energia Group and the United Nations Sustainable Development Goals Advocacy Hub.
