= Yangtze River cruise =

River cruise in China

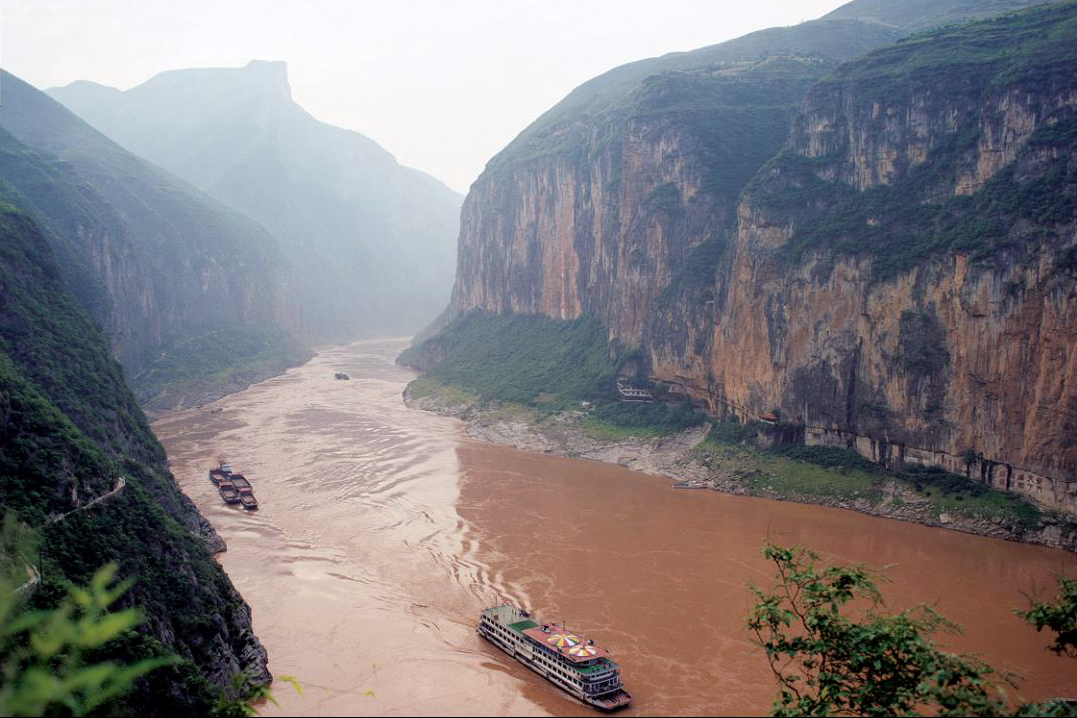
The Qutang Gorge, one of the Three Gorges, before the completion of the Three Gorges Dam

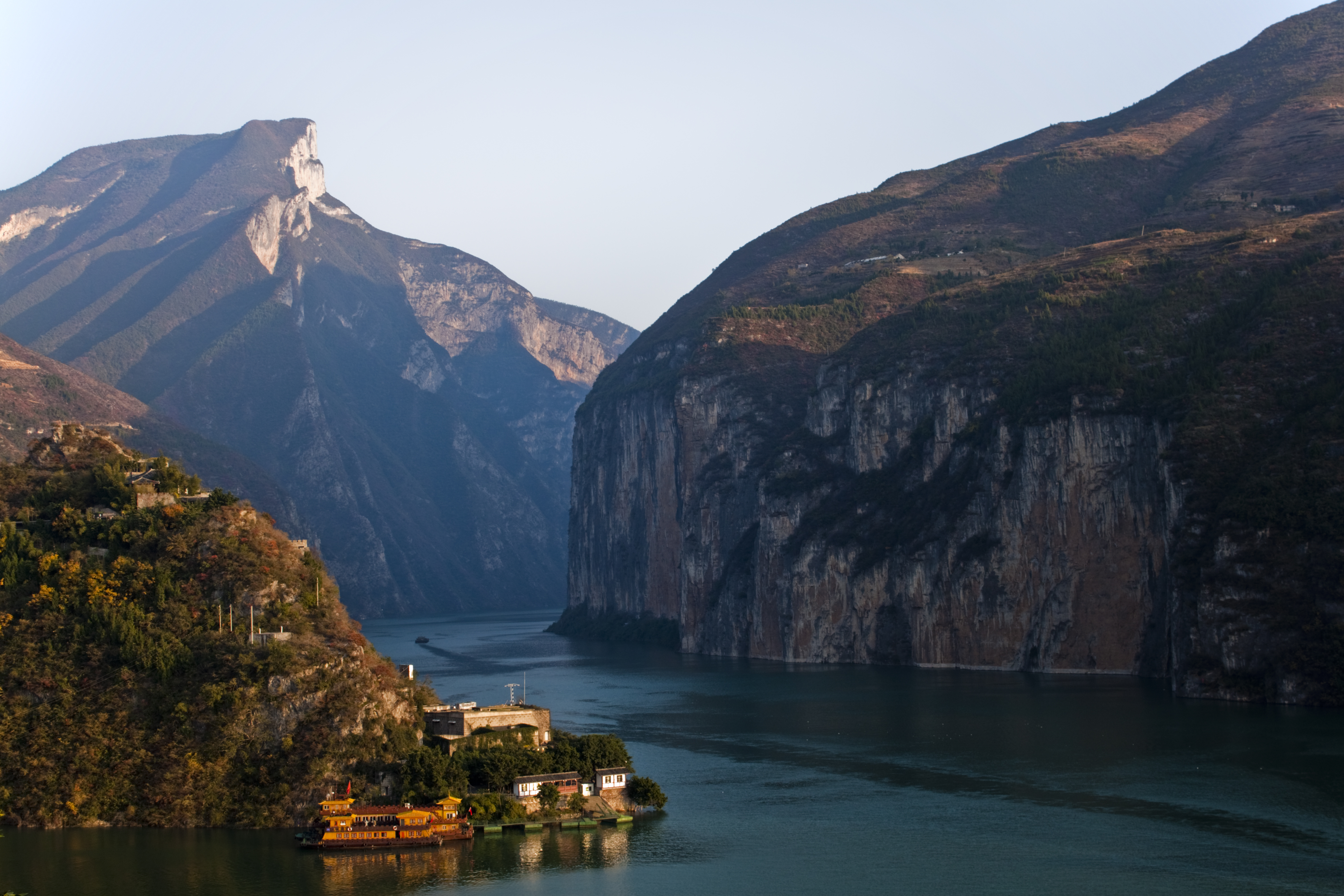
The Qutang Gorge, after the completion of the Three Gorges Dam

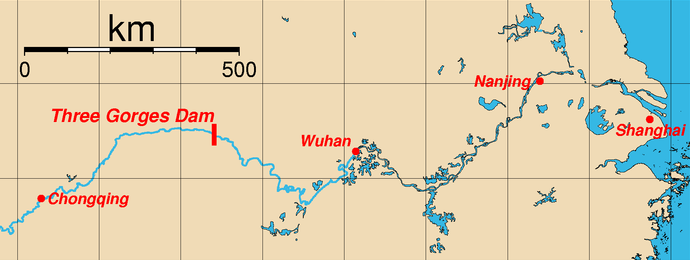
The Yangtze River cruise covers about 500 km, from Chongqing via the Three Gorges to Yichang or 600 km to Wuhan

Yangtze River cruise (Chinese: 长江旅游) is a river cruise on the Yangtze, the longest river in China and in Asia. It has historically been called the Three Gorges cruise (Chinese: 长江三峡旅游) because of the cruise in the Three Gorges, the most exciting part of the river.

== History ==
The Three Gorges cruise has been known for a long time. Li Bai, one of the most important poets of the Tang dynasty wrote about his cruise in the famous poem (早發白帝城) in 759 AD: "Leaving the White Imperial Castle in the morning, Reaching Jingzhou was a quick day trip; Hearing monkeys on both banks, our light boat sped through the mountains".

== Modern-day cruise ==
Several shipping companies, located in Chongqing operate the Yangtze River cruises with large pleasure boats. They are Victoria Cruises, President Cruises, New Century Cruises, Yangtze Gold Cruises, Yangtze River Cruise, etc.

The itinerary of a typical 4-day, 3-night trip will be like:

- Starting at Chaotianmen Port (朝天門埠頭) in Chongqing in the evening (Water flows raidly here)
- Off the ship at Fengdu (豊都) to visit the Fengdu Ghost City
- Passing by the Shibaozhai tower
- Off the ship at Fengjie to take a short trip to the renowned Baidicheng Castle (Already still water here, because of the Three Gorges Dam)
- Passing through the Qutang Gorge (8 km), the first of the Three Gorges
- Off the ship at Wushan and get on a boat to visit the Lesser Three Gorges, where the minority peoples live
- Cruising under the Badong Bridge of China National Highway 209
- Passing through the Wu Gorge (45 km), the second of the Three Gorges
- In passing through the Xiling Gorge (66 km), the last of the Three Gorges, go through the five-stage locks of the Three Gorges Dam, built in Sandouping Village.
- Off the ship to visit Tanzjling Hill (壇子嶺) to look down on the Three Gorges Dam in the west, and the up and down Locks in the east
- Passing through the Huangmei Gorge (黄梅峡)
- End of the cruise at a river port in Yichang, Hubei

Some cruises may go down further to Wuhan, the capital of Hubei Province.

== Gallery ==
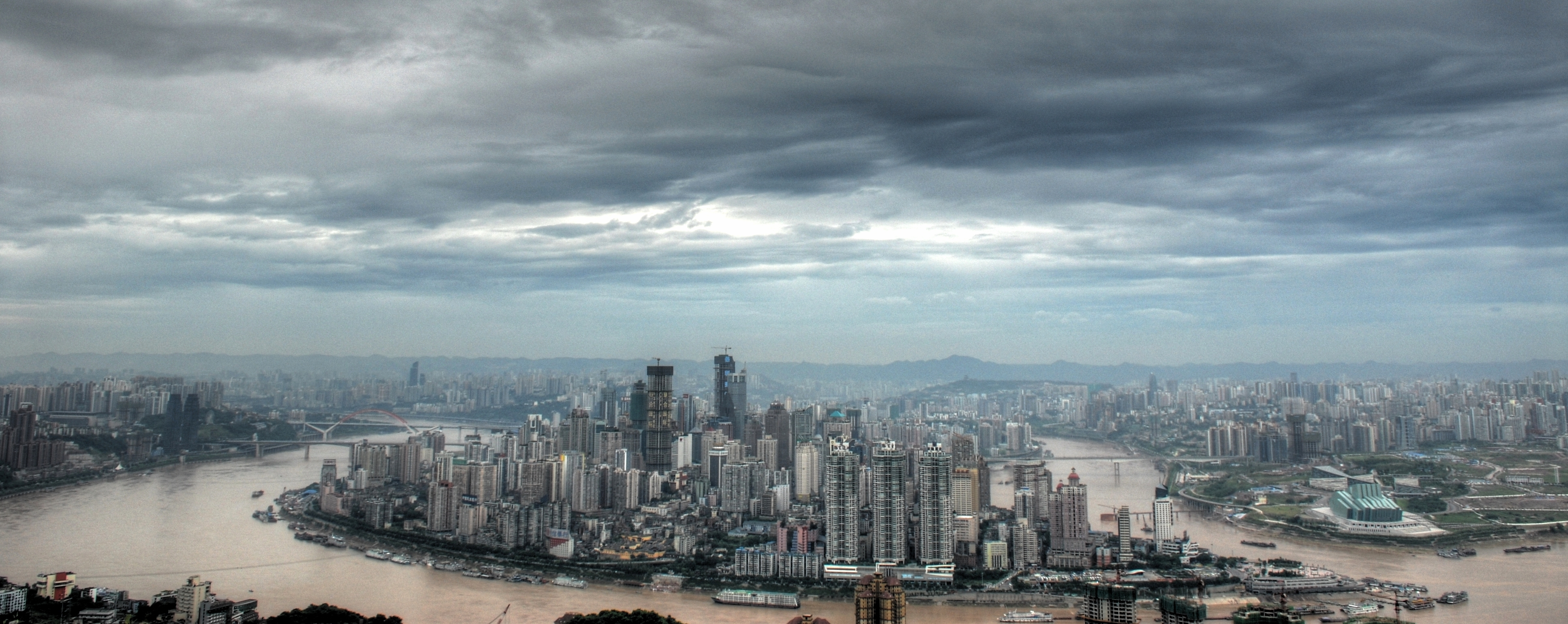
Start of thePassing by the Shibaozhai tower cruise in Chongqin

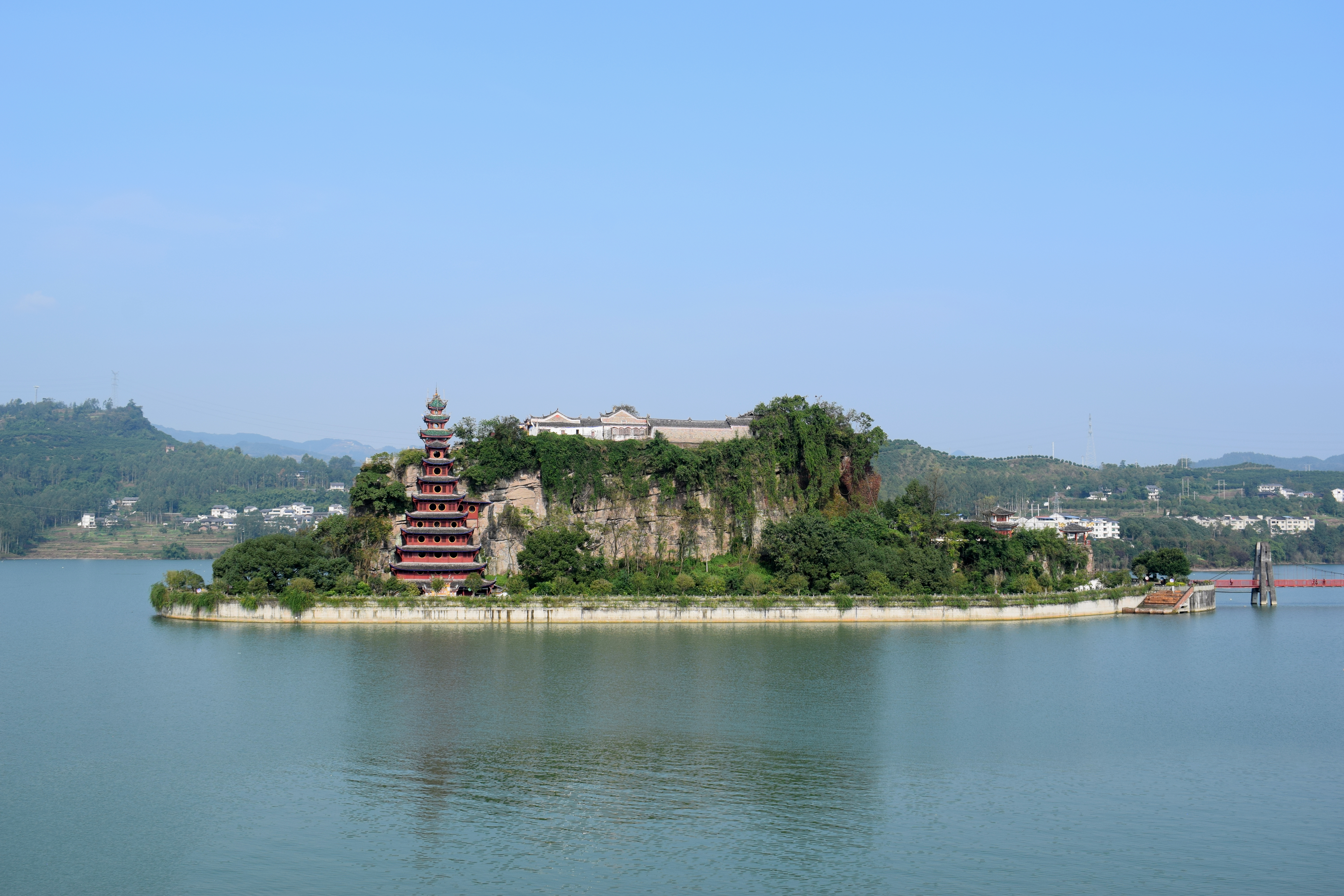
Passing by the Shibaozhai tower

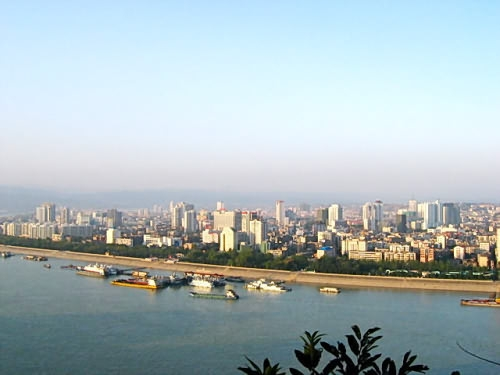
End of the cruise in Yichang

== Longer cruises ==
There are other longer cruises on the Yangtze, such as between Shanghai and Chongqing.

== See also ==
- Danube River cruise
- Tourism on the Yangtze River
