= Wuxia (disambiguation) =

Wuxia is a genre of Chinese fiction about martial heroes.

Wuxia or Wu Xia or variation, may also refer to:

== Places ==
- Wu Gorge (simplified Chinese: 巫峡; traditional Chinese: 巫峽; pinyin: Wū Xiá), one of the Three Gorges on the Yangtze River, between Chongqing and Hubei in China
- Wuxia, Chongqing, a town in Wushan County, Chongqing, China
- Wuxia Subdistrict, Dongli District, Tianjin, China

== Other uses ==
- Dragon (2011 film) (Chinese: 武俠; pinyin: Wǔ Xiá), martial-arts film directed by Peter Chan
- Wu Xia, the 2007 Chinese Chess world champion at the World Xiangqi Championship

== See also ==
- Xia (disambiguation)
- Wu (disambiguation)
