= Daning River =

Daning River (Chinese: 大宁河) may refer to the following rivers in China:

- Daning River (Chongqing)
- Daning River (Guangxi)
