= Chongqing Wushan Airport =

Airport in Chongqing, China

Chongqing Wushan Airport 重庆巫山机场
- IATA: WSK; ICAO: ZUWS

Summary
- Airport type: Public
- Serves: Wushan, Chongqing, China
- Opened: August 16, 2019; 6 years ago
- Elevation AMSL: 1,680 m / 5,512 ft
- Coordinates: 31.064°N 109.706°E

Map
- Location of airport in Chongqing

Runways
Direction	Length		Surface
Direction	m	ft	Surface
06/24	2,600	8,530

Statistics (2021)
- Passengers: 89,414
- Aircraft movements: 1,466
- Cargo (metric tons): 12.2

Chongqing Wushan Airport
- Simplified Chinese: 重庆巫山机场
- Traditional Chinese: 重慶巫山機場
Transcriptions
Standard Mandarin
- Hanyu Pinyin: Chóngqìng Wūshān Jīchǎng

Chongqing Wushan Airport (IATA: WSK, ICAO: ZUWS) is an airport serving Wushan County of China's Chongqing Municipality.

The airport is located at the border of Wushan and Fengjie counties, 15 kilometres (9.3 mi) from the county seat, and mainly serves tourists to the nearby Three Gorges region. Construction began on 20 April 2015, and the airport was opened on 16 August 2019. It is the fourth airport with regularly scheduled passenger service in the municipality of Chongqing. It is located 350 kilometres (220 mi) from central Chongqing as the crow flies. It was originally named Wushan Shennüfeng Airport (巫山神女峰机场).

== Airlines and destinations ==
Airlines	Destinations
China Express Airlines	Guiyang, Yantai
China Southern Airlines	Guangzhou

== See also ==
- List of airports in China
- List of the busiest airports in China
