= Qutang Gorge =

Shortest of China's Three Gorges

Coordinates: 31°02′35″N 109°33′42″E

- Traditional Chinese: 瞿塘峽
- Simplified Chinese: 瞿塘峡
Transcriptions
Standard Mandarin
- Hanyu Pinyin: Qútáng Xiá

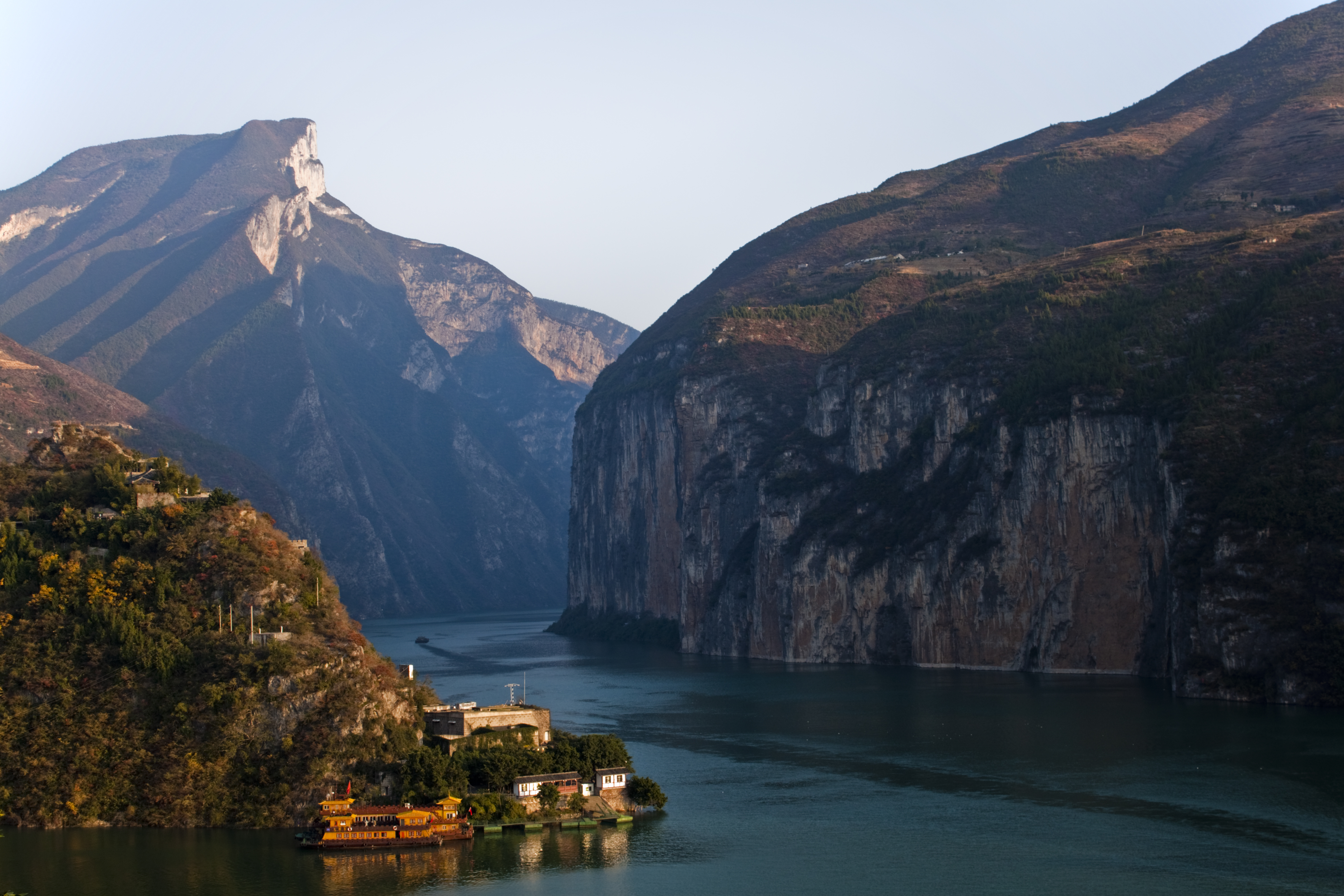
The Qutang Gorge in 2009, reservoir at high water

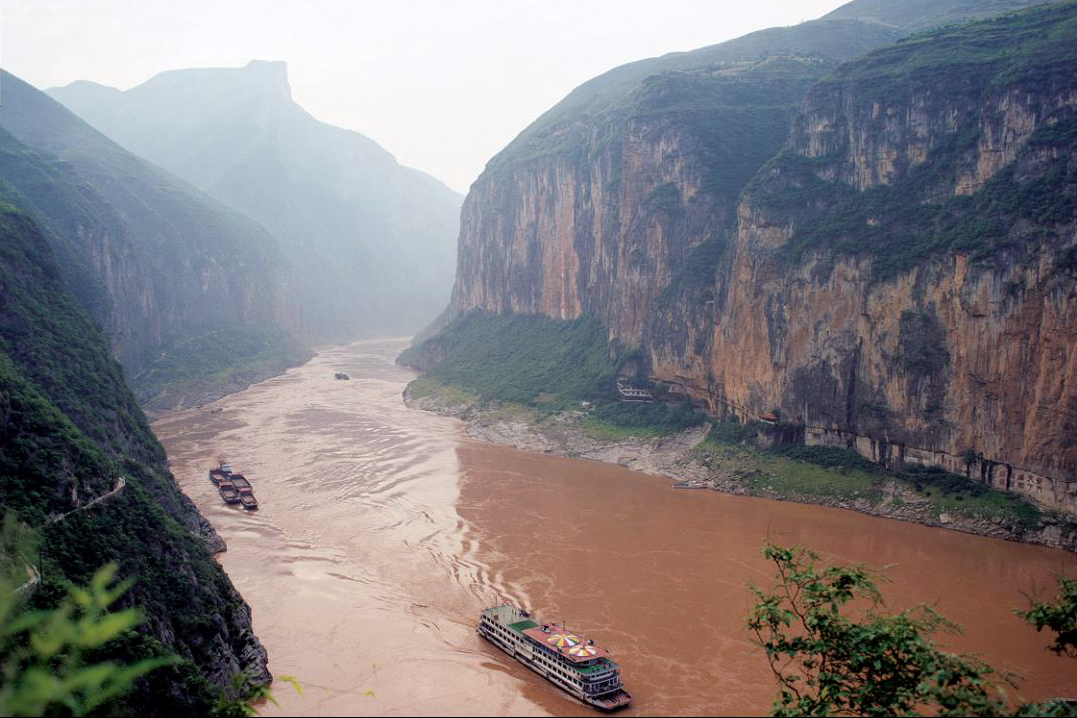
The Qutang Gorge in 1999, prior to the dam's completion

The Qutang Gorge (simplified Chinese: 瞿塘峡; traditional Chinese: 瞿塘峽; pinyin: Qútáng Xiá) is the shortest of China's Three Gorges. Immediately downstream of the ancient Baidicheng (白帝城) fortress, the Yangtze River passes between the Chijia Mountain (赤甲山) on the north and the Baiyan Mountain (白鹽山) on the south. The point where the river passes between these mountains is called the Kuimen (夔門) and it is the entrance to the Qutang Gorge – the first of the three Yangtze gorges. The Qutang Gorge is only 8 kilometres (5.0 mi) long, but it is also the narrowest of the Three Gorges. The widest point measures only 150 metres (500 ft) wide. The mountains on either side reach as high as 1,200 metres (4,000 ft). This combination of narrow among high mountains with several switchbacks in only 8 kilometres creates spectacular vistas, and the Qutang Gorge is often considered the most beautiful of all Three Gorges.

== Sites ==
=== Baidicheng ===
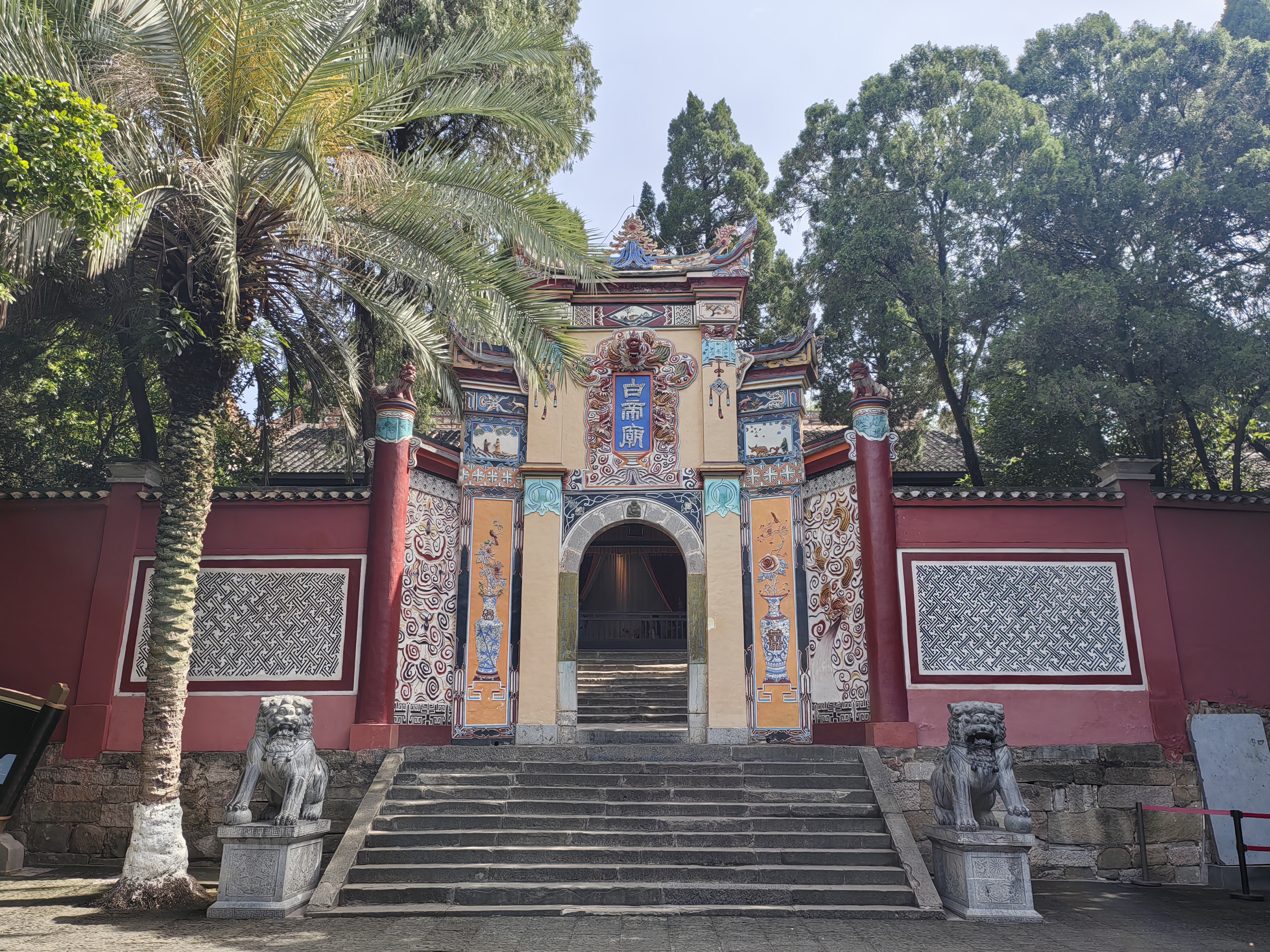
Baidicheng, an ancient city on the shore of the Yangtze.

Baidicheng was an ancient city on the northern shore of the Yangtze River. Baidicheng was also where Liu Bei, first emperor of the Kingdom of Shu during the Three Kingdoms era, died. There is a Liu Bei Memorial Temple and a Zhuge Liang Memorial Temple in Baidicheng. Baidicheng is a major tourist attraction of a Yangtse cruise.

=== Chalk Wall ===
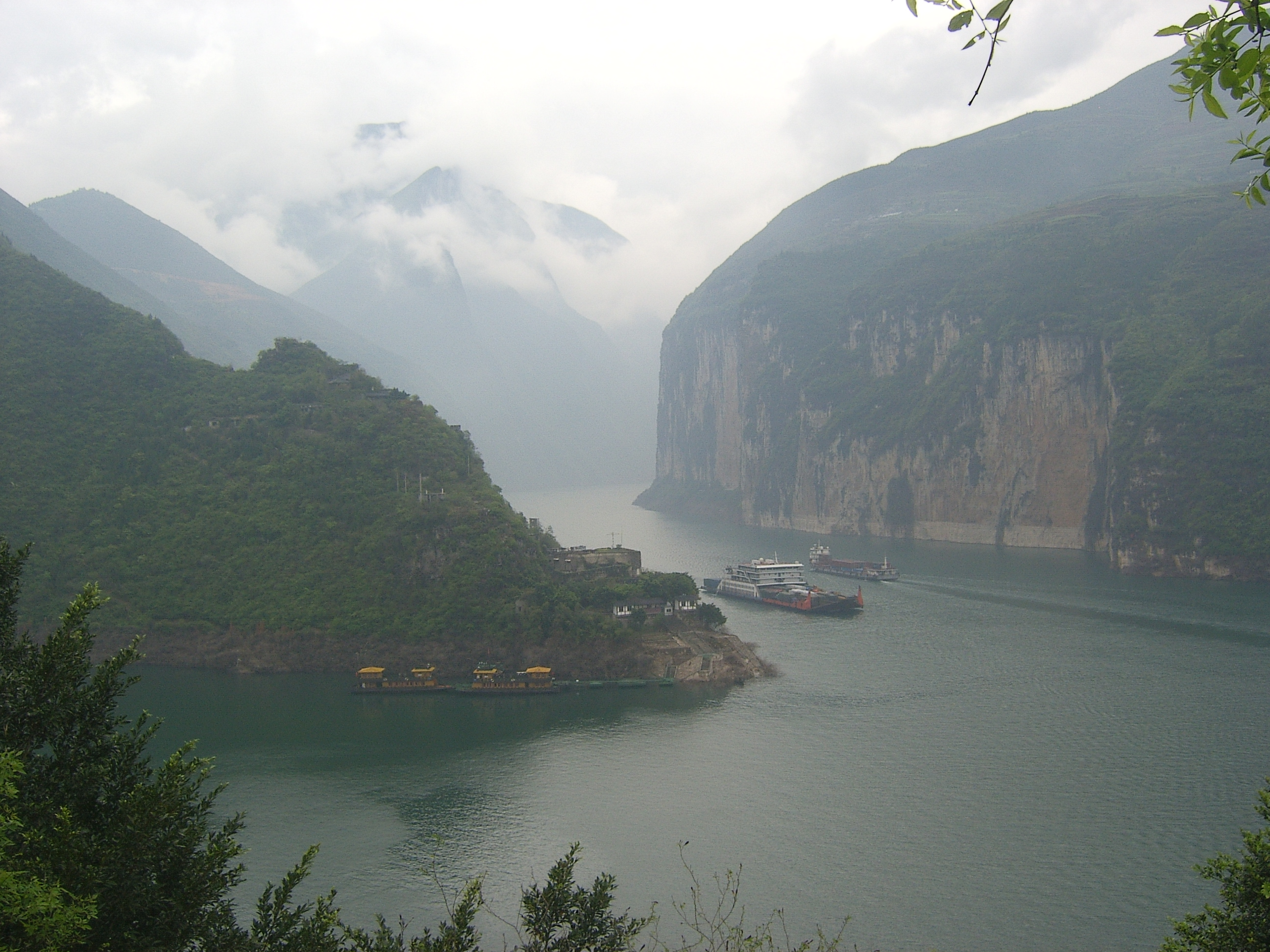
The Qutang Gorge along the Yangtze River.

The Chalk Wall (粉筆牆) is a white cliff face on the southern bank of the Yangtze River at the entrance to the Qutang Gorge (Kuimen Gate). The Chalk Wall has numerous characters carved into the rock, many of which were done by famous Chinese calligraphers. Nearly 1,000 characters in all are carved into the rock wall, with the oldest dating to the Song dynasty (960–1279). The wall has characters carved in many different styles of calligraphy and in various sizes. The largest characters are approximately 1.7 metres (6 ft) wide.

=== The Meng Liang Stairway ===
On the south side of the river (Baiyan Mountain) a series of rectangular holes is carved into the cliff face. The holes are almost exactly 1 metre apart and 1 metre deep. The holes zig-zag up part of the cliff face in a Z-shape. These holes are known as the Meng Liang Stairway (孟良梯).

Legend has it that the holes were built by a Song dynasty soldier named Meng Liang (孟良). Meng Liang served for a general named Yang Jiye who was buried at the top of the cliff. Meng Liang wanted to find the remains of General Yang and give him a proper burial back in his home town. During the night Meng Liang constructed the stairway. A monk at the top of the mountain saw him coming and crowed like a rooster. Meng Liang, thinking the morning had arrived, quickly abandoned his plan to avoid being caught.

Holes such as these are used as a walk-way several places in the Three Gorges region. Poles were inserted into the holes and then either a walkway could be constructed or a person could walk from pole to pole. Historians do not know why these particular holes were constructed, nor do they know why they only reach part of the way up the cliff face. Remains of city walls have been located at the top of the cliff, and some historians have theorized that the pathway might have been intended to enable a person to access the city from the river.

Another set of similar holes can be found near Wushan in the Little Three Gorges (小三峽) of the Daning River (大寧河). The local tourism agency in Wushan has placed poles in some of these holes so that tourists can see how they were used in ancient times.

=== Hanging Monk Rock ===
On the cliff face near Meng Liang's Staircase there is a rock shaped like an upside down person. This is the Hanging Monk Rock (倒吊和尚). According to legend, when Meng Liang discovered that the monk had feigned a rooster call, and frightened him off the mountain, he was so angry that he found the monk and hung him upside down from the cliff face.

=== Drinking Phoenix Spring ===
Along the cliff face near the Chalk Wall and Meng Liang's Stairway there are a number of caves. Dripping water from natural springs within the caves have created many stalactites. One particular stalactite is approximately 10 metres (33 ft) high, and it is shaped like a Phoenix displaying its tail feathers. Moss and bamboo growing next to the formation look like feathers on a bird. Water still drips from the head of the stalactite bird, and hence the Chinese have dubbed it the Drinking Phoenix Spring (鳳凰泉). The formation is extremely difficult to see from the river, but there is a pathway that allows direct access to the caves.

=== The Ancient Pathway (古棧道) ===
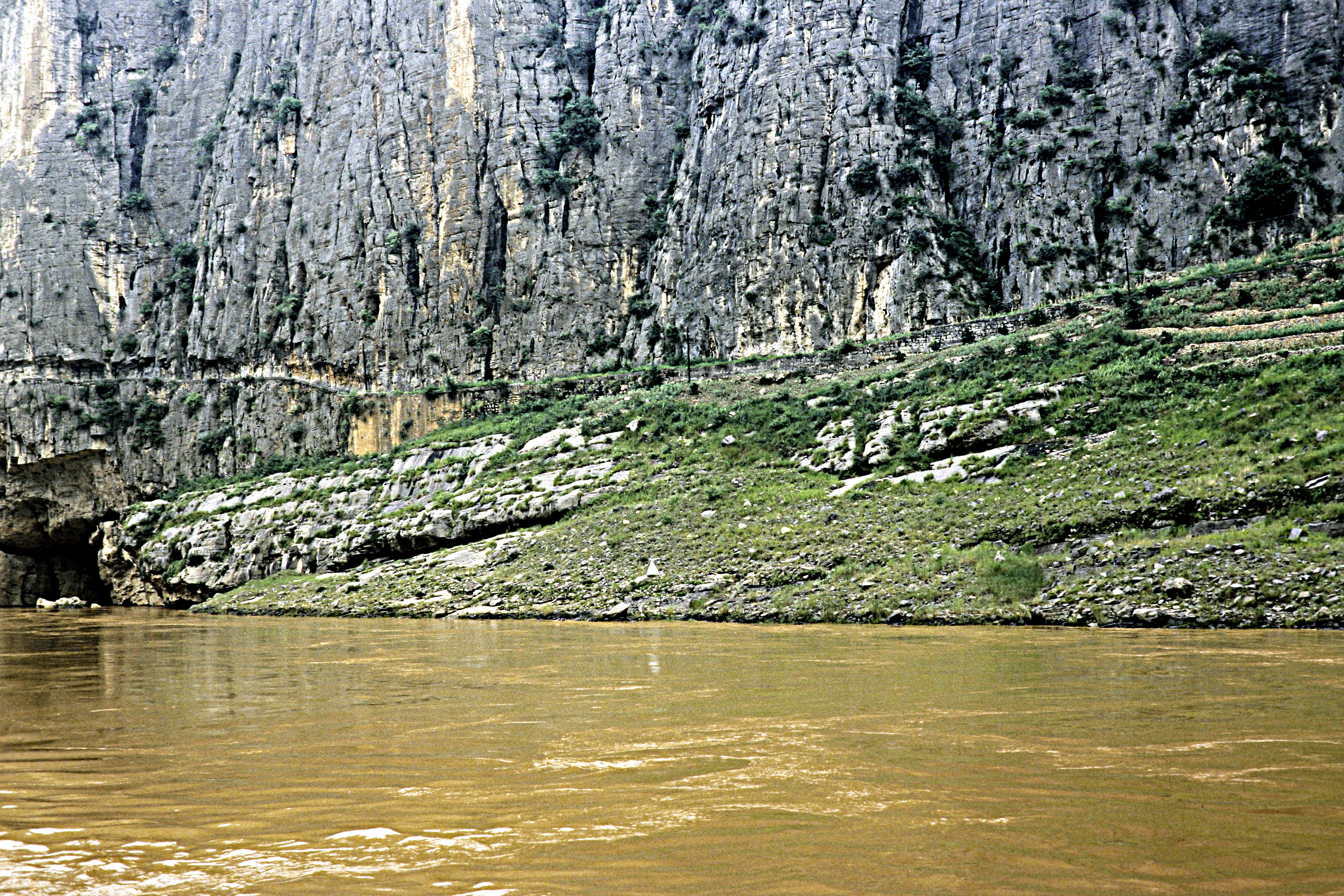
Tow path inside Qutang Gorge in 1980

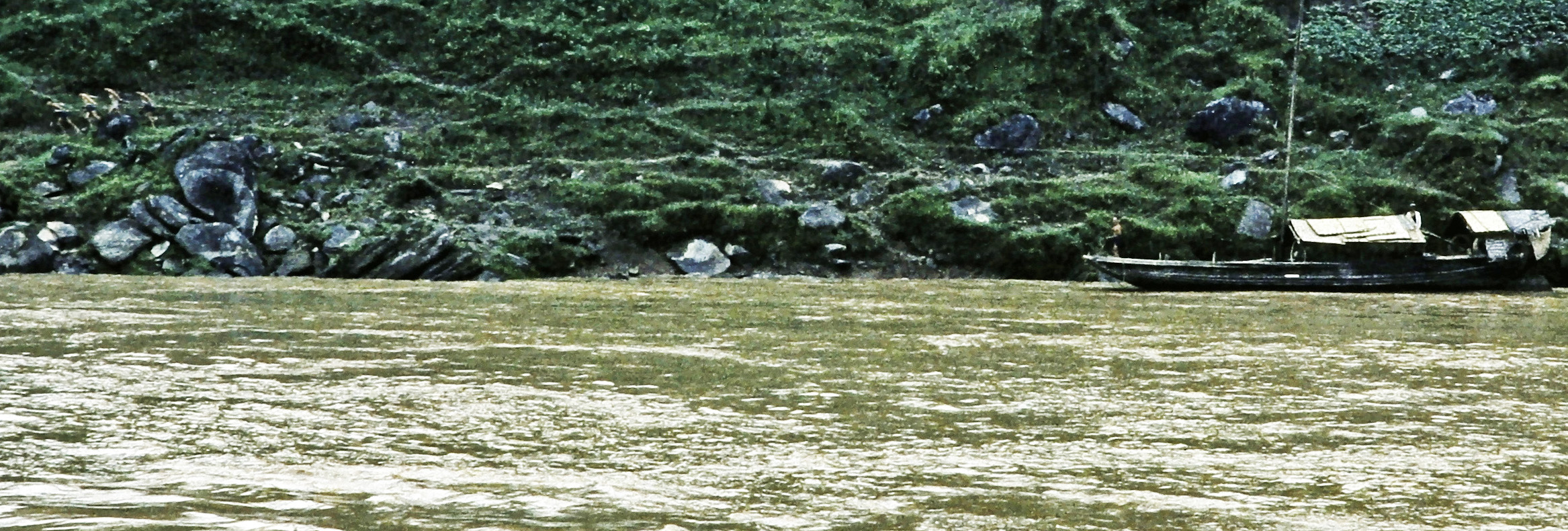
Four men towing a boat upstream near Qutang Gorge in 1980

These narrow footpaths were built starting in the Western Han dynasty (206 BC – 220 AD) and continued to be maintained and improved until the middle of the 20th century. The original purpose was to provide a footpath for human haulers to pull boats upstream. Thus they were always alongside cliffs next to the river. Since the earliest days, boats going downstream used oars just to get steerage way. Going upstream, human powered oars were no match to the rapid current. Thus gangs of humans, harnessed to a tow rope, hauled the boats upstream. These haulers needed a path along the steep cliffs to walk on. Thus the Ancient Pathways were built. Even today haulers can be seen as in 天山網. Over the years, these paths were expanded and improved. In addition to paths for haulers, paths were built for hauling goods up mountains. These higher paths would survive the flooding after the Three Gorges Dam is complete.

=== Hanging Coffins ===
Hanging coffins (懸棺) are a method of ceremonially placing the corpses of the deceased upon cliff sides, an ancient funeral custom of some minority groups, especially the Bo people of southern China. Coffins of various significant shapes were often carved out of a whole piece of wood. Hanging coffins either rest upon beams projecting outward from the cliff's vertical faces such as mountains, are placed in caves in the face of cliffs, or sit on natural rock projections on mountain faces.

=== The Rhinoceros Gazing at the Moon (犀牛望月峰) ===
The Rhinoceros Gazing at the Moon (犀牛望月峰) is a rock formation that resembles a rhinoceros with head raised.

=== Daxi Village ===
The Daxi settlement was the first discovered site of the Daxi culture.

== Impact of the Three Gorges Dam ==
Although the Qutang Gorge is the furthest upstream of all the affected gorges, the impact of the Three Gorges Dam on the Qutang Gorge has been especially large. Many of the historically significant sites in the Qutang Gorge are located closer to the water level. Even prior to the dam construction the water level would come close to many sites during the rainy season. The water has now covered many of the important sites in the Gorge including the Ancient Pathway, Meng Liang's Staircase, the Chalk Wall, and the cave within the Bellows Gorge.
