= Daning River Bridge =

Daning River Bridge 大宁河桥
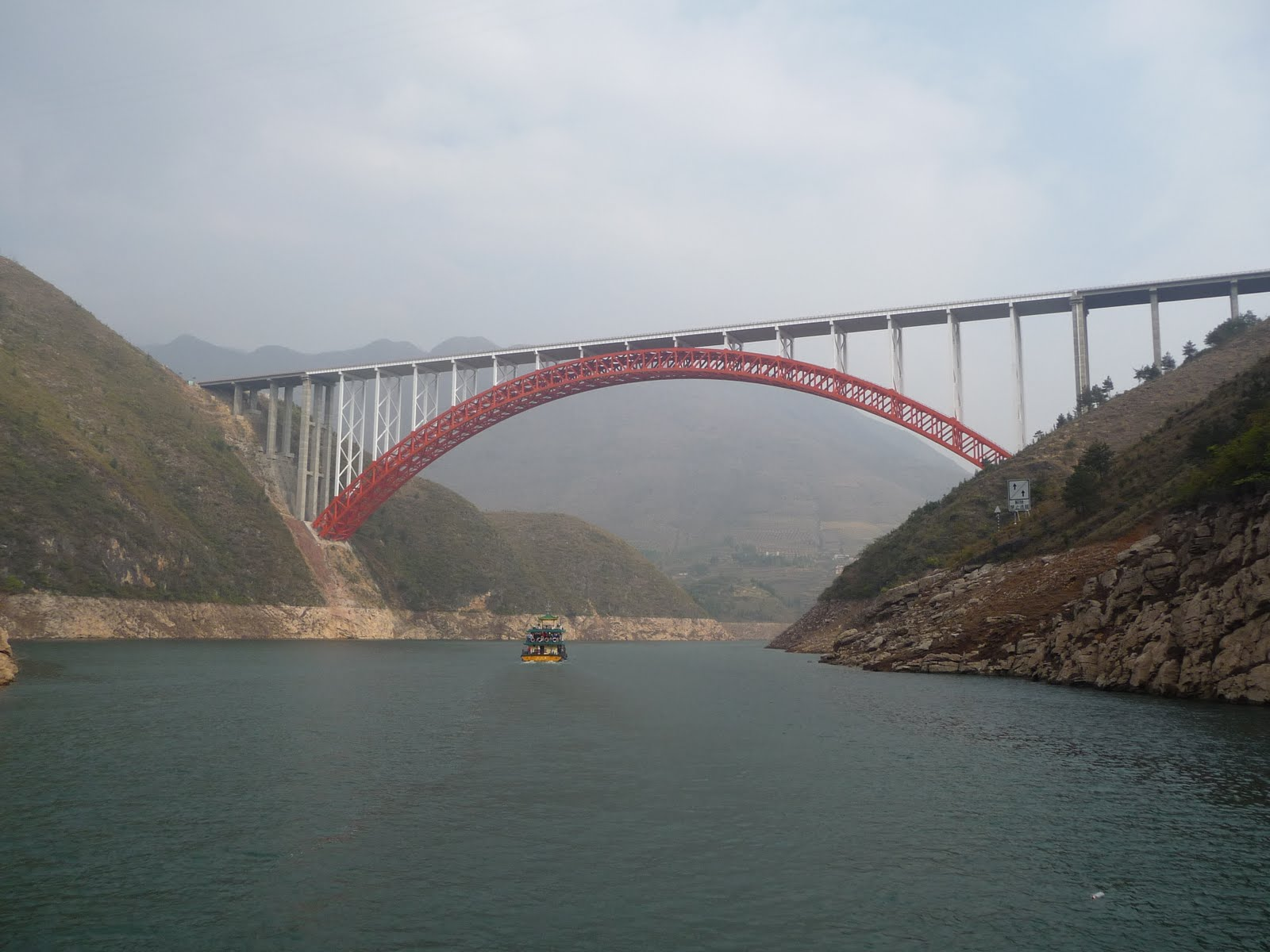
- Coordinates: 31.113528°N 109.889694°E
- Carries: G42 Hurong Expressway
- Crosses: Daning River
- Locale: Wushan, Chongqing, China
- Other name: Daninghe Bridge

Characteristics
- Design: Arch Bridge
- Material: Steel/concrete
- Total length: 681 metres (2,234 ft)
- Width: 24.5 metres (80 ft)
- Longest span: 400 metres (1,300 ft)
- Clearance above: 219 metres (719 ft)

History
- Opened: 2009

Location
- Interactive map of Daning River Bridge

The Daning River Bridge is an arch bridge near Wushan, Chongqing, China. The bridge opened in 2009 carrying traffic on the G42 Shanghai–Chengdu Expressway across the Daning River. The bridge spans 400 metres (1,300 ft) making it one of the longest arch bridges in the world. The bridge is also among the highest in the world however the reservoir created by the construction of the Three Gorges Dam has increased the height of the river below the bridge and the full 219-metre (719 ft) clearance is no longer visible.

== See also ==
- List of longest arch bridge spans
- List of highest bridges in the world
