= Wushan Yangtze River Bridge =

Wushan Yangtze River Bridge 巫山长江大桥
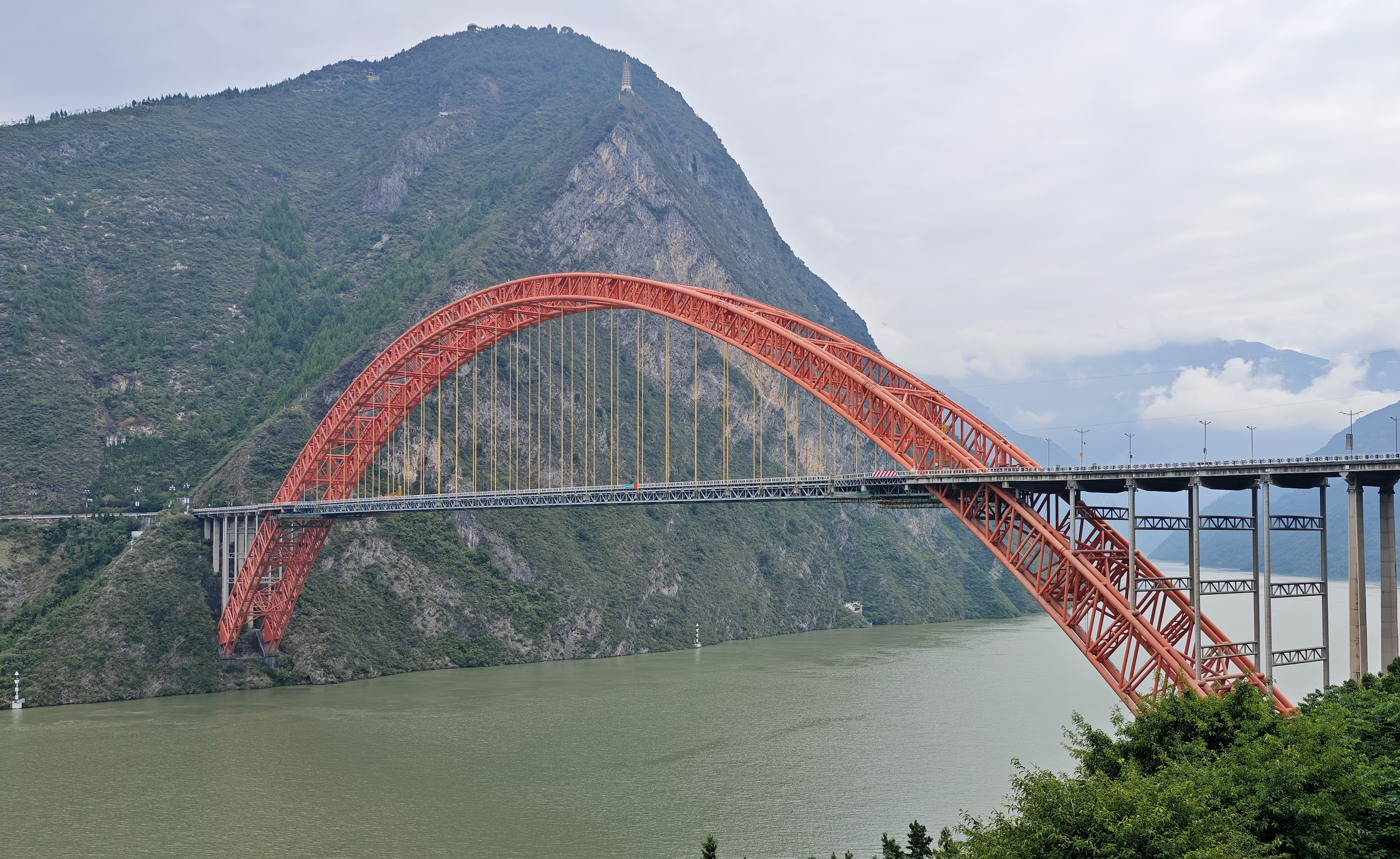
- Coordinates: 31.063056°N 109.902111°E
- Crosses: Yangtze River
- Locale: Wushan, Chongqing, China

Characteristics
- Design: CFST arch bridge
- Material: Steel, concrete
- Total length: 612 m (2,008 ft)
- Height: 130 m (430 ft)
- Longest span: 460 m (1,510 ft)
- Clearance above: 180 m (590 ft)

History
- Construction start: 2001
- Construction cost: ¥160 million
- Opened: January 8, 2005

Location
- Interactive map of Wushan Yangtze River Bridge

The Wushan Yangtze River Bridge is an arch bridge, which carries S301 Provincial Road across the Yangtze River near Wushan, Chongqing, China. Completed in 2005, the 130 metres (430 ft) high arch spans 460 metres (1,510 ft) ranking it in the top ten longest arch bridges in the world. The bridge is also among the highest in the world; however, the reservoir created by the construction of the Three Gorges Dam has increased the height of the water below the bridge, and the full 180-metre (590 ft) clearance is no longer visible. The bridge was officially opened to the public on January 8, 2005.

== See also ==
- Bridges and tunnels across the Yangtze River
- List of bridges in China
- List of longest arch bridge spans
- List of highest bridges
