= Wu Gorge =

Gorge on the Yangtze River, China

Coordinates: 31°01′30″N 110°05′00″E

- Traditional Chinese: 巫峽
- Simplified Chinese: 巫峡
- Postal: Wu Gorge
Transcriptions
Standard Mandarin
- Hanyu Pinyin: Wū Xiá
- Wade–Giles: Wu^{1} Hsia^{2}

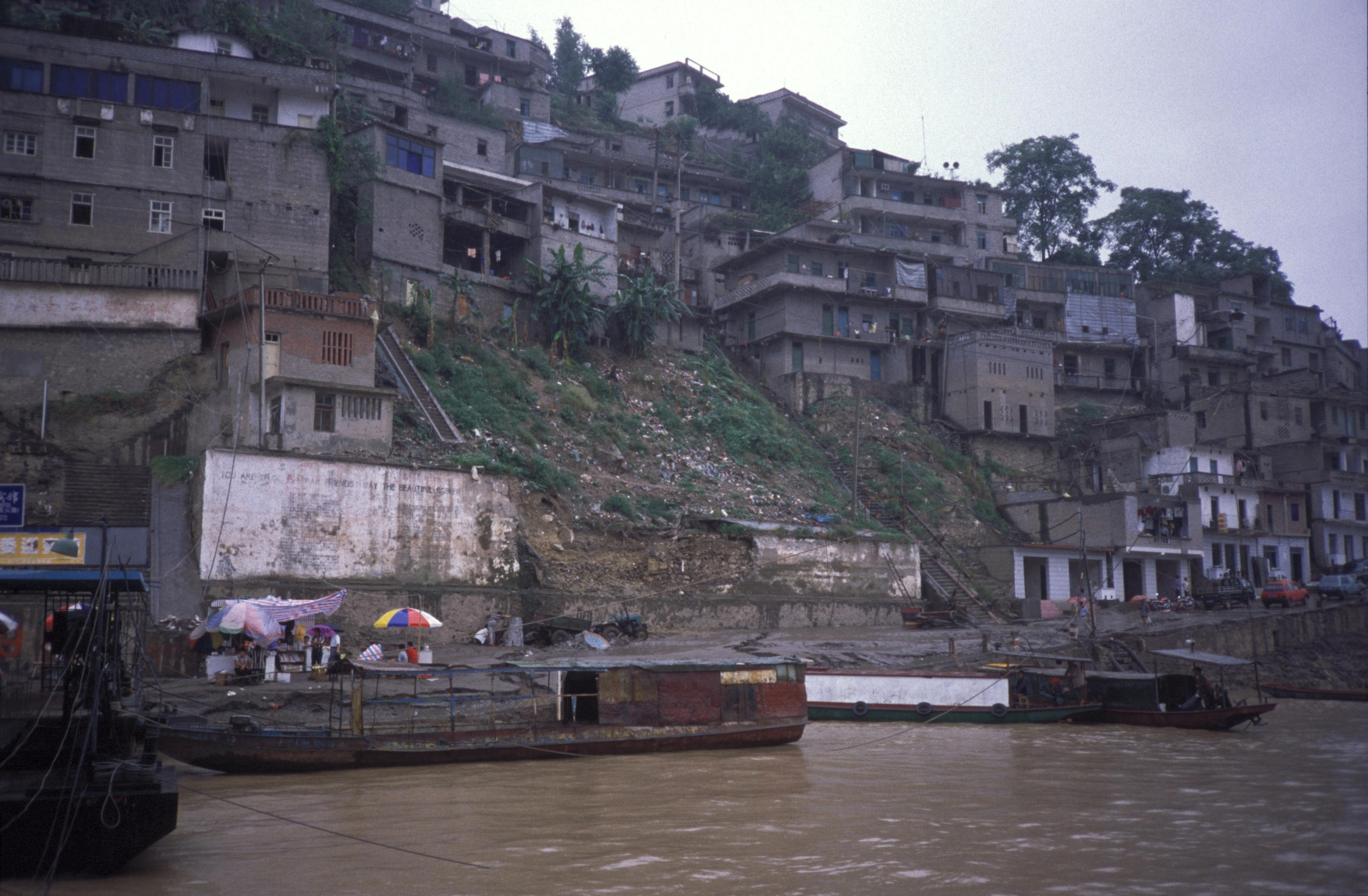
Wushan

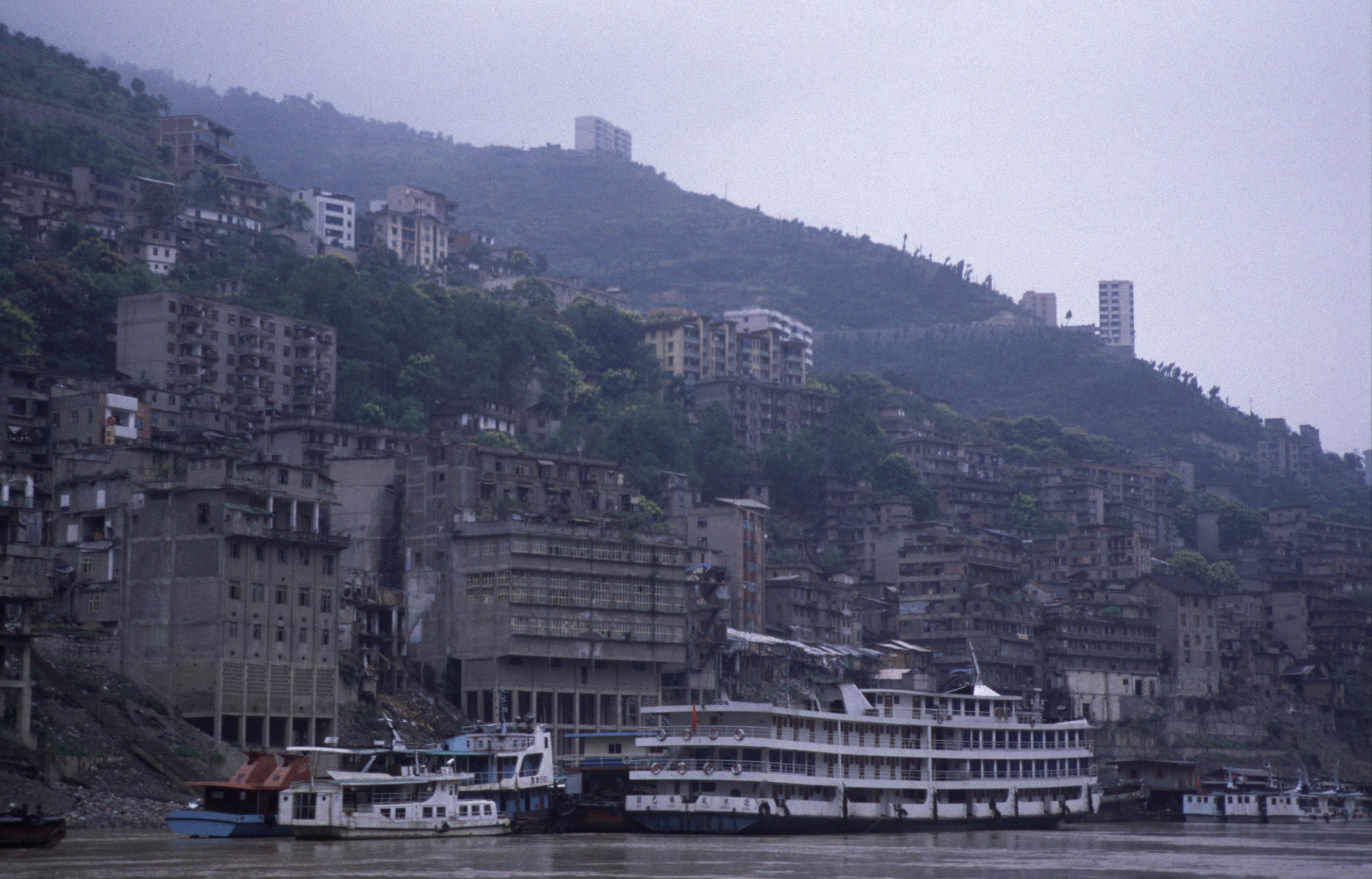
Badong town

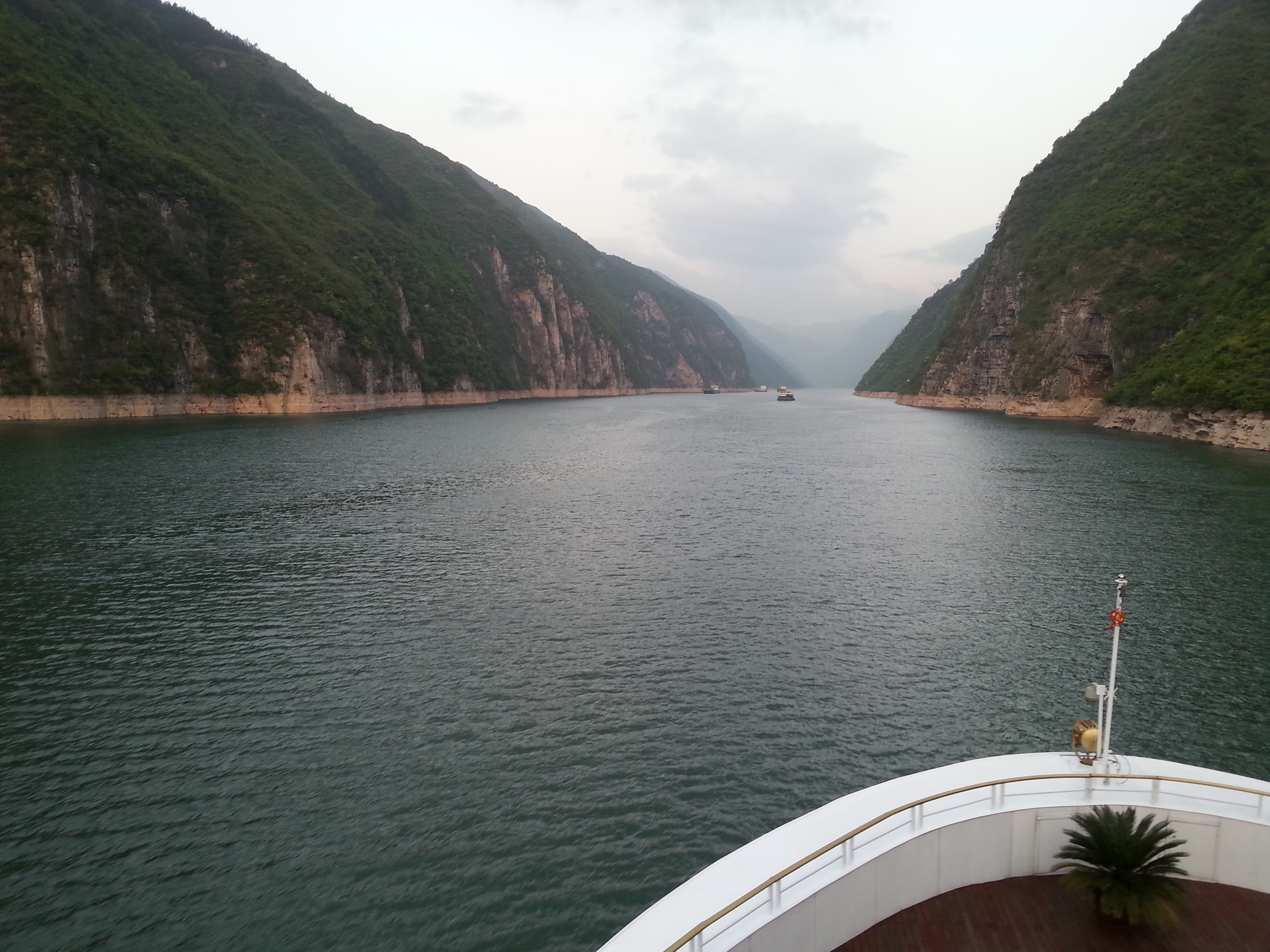
Wu Gorge on Yangtze

Wu Gorge (simplified Chinese: 巫峡; traditional Chinese: 巫峽; pinyin: Wū Xiá), sometimes called Great Gorge (Chinese: 大峡; pinyin: Dà Xiá), is the second gorge of the Three Gorges system on the Yangtze River, People's Republic of China. It stretches 45 km (28 mi) from Wushan to Guandukou, and is located downstream of Qutang Gorge and upstream of Xiling Gorge. The gorge straddles the boundary between Wushan County of Chongqing Municipality (formerly part of Sichuan Province) and Badong County, Hubei Province.

The gorge has been known as the Wu Gorge since at least the Three Kingdoms period, when it was recorded in the geographical treatise Shui Jing Zhu. In 589 AD, General Lü Zhongsu of the Chen dynasty stationed troops in the Wu and Xiling Gorges in an attempt to stop the advancing Sui dynasty armies. Tang dynasty poet Yang Jiong wrote a classical poem entitled "Passing Wu Gorge" (Chinese: 過巫峽).

Among the Twelve Peaks of the Wu Gorge, the most spectacular is the Goddess Peak. Legend has it that this peak is the incarnation of Yaoji who assisted Yu the Great in controlling the waters.

The mountains on both sides of the Yangtze, through which the river cuts the Wu Gorge, are known as the Wu Mountains (巫山, Wū Shān).
