= Wuxia, Chongqing =

Wuxia 巫峡镇
- Town
- Location in Chongqing
- Coordinates: 31°4′57″N 109°52′43″E
- Country: People's Republic of China
- Direct-administered municipality: Chongqing
- County: Wushan County
- Time zone: UTC+8 (China Standard)

Wuxia (simplified Chinese: 巫峡; traditional Chinese: 巫峽; pinyin: Wūxiá) is a town in Wushan County, Chongqing province, China. As of 2020, it administers Nanling Residential Community (南陵社区) and the following 18 villages:

- Xiping Village (西坪村)
- Liushu Village (柳树村)
- Ping'an Village (平安村)
- Donggang Village (东岗村)
- Tiaoshi Village (跳石村)
- Baiquan Village (白泉村)
- Shili Village (石里村)
- Baishui Village (白水村)
- Longshan Village (龙山村)
- Lüshui Village (绿水村)
- Hongmiao Village (红庙村)
- Qingshan Village (青山村)
- Qingquan Village (春泉村)
- Qixing Village (七星村)
- Xinlu Village (新路村)
- Chenjia Village (陈家村)
- Wenfeng Village (文峰村)
- Guihua Village (桂花村)

== See also ==
- List of township-level divisions of Chongqing
