= Wushan County, Chongqing =

Wushan 巫山县
- County
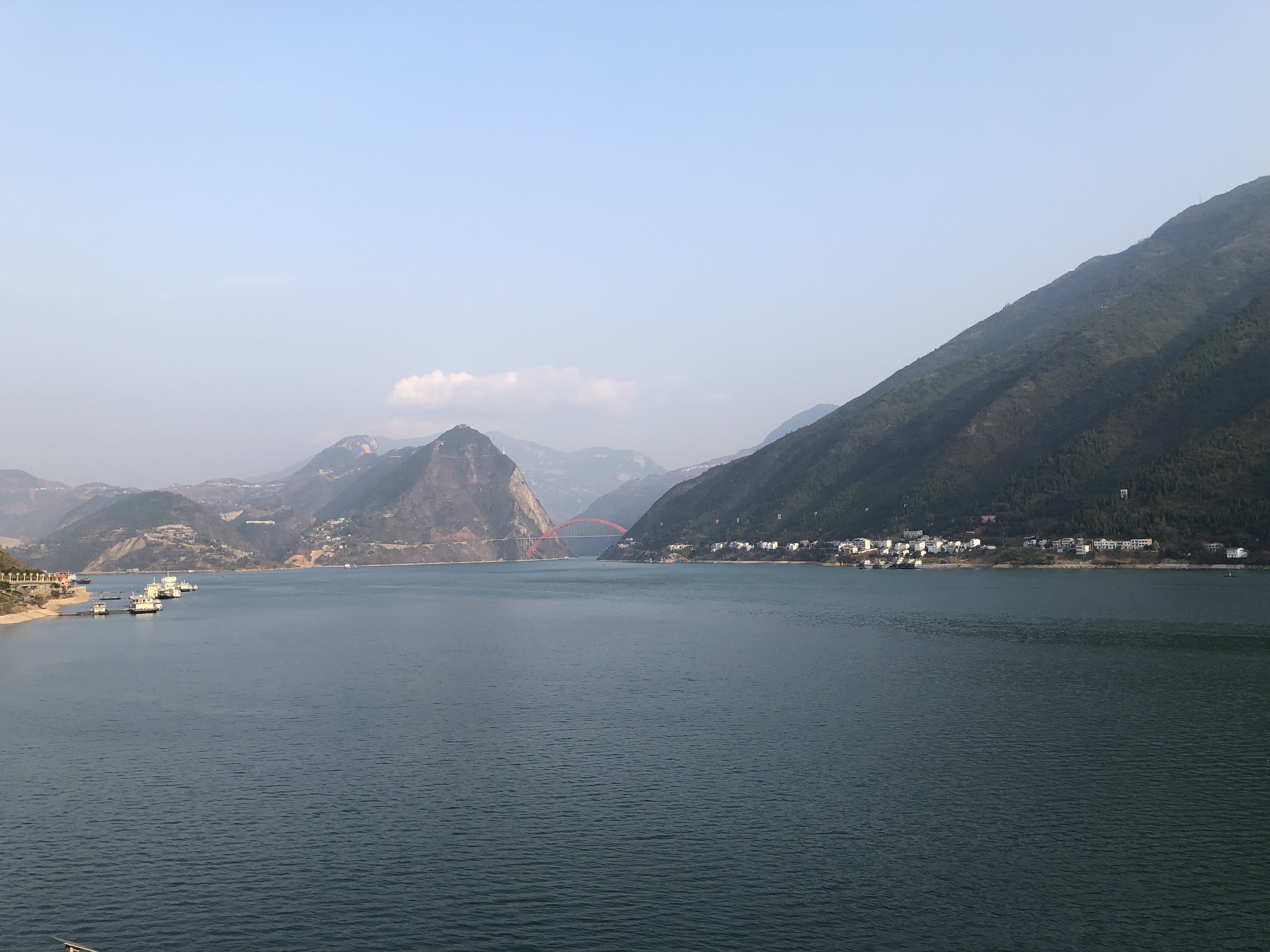
- Wushan, Wu Gorge and Wushan Yangtze River Bridge

- Location of Wushan County in Chongqing
- Country: People's Republic of China
- Municipality: Chongqing

Area
  - Total: 2,958.2 km^{2} (1,142.2 sq mi)

Population (2010)
  - Total: 495,072
  - Density: 167.36/km^{2} (433.45/sq mi)
- Time zone: UTC+8 (China Standard)

Wushan County (Chinese: 巫山县; pinyin: Wūshān Xiàn) is a county located in Chongqing municipality. It occupies roughly 2,958 km^{2} (1,142 mi^{2}) and has a population of about 600,000.

The county seat is located at the western entrance to the Wu Gorge in the Three Gorges region. Wushan is famous for its Little Three Gorges (小三峡) located on the nearby Daning River.

The Wushan county seat is on the northern bank of the Yangtze River channel, which in the Gorges region was flooded after the construction of the Three Gorges Dam. The original town was abandoned and submerged under the rising waters, and the new town constructed on the hills above.

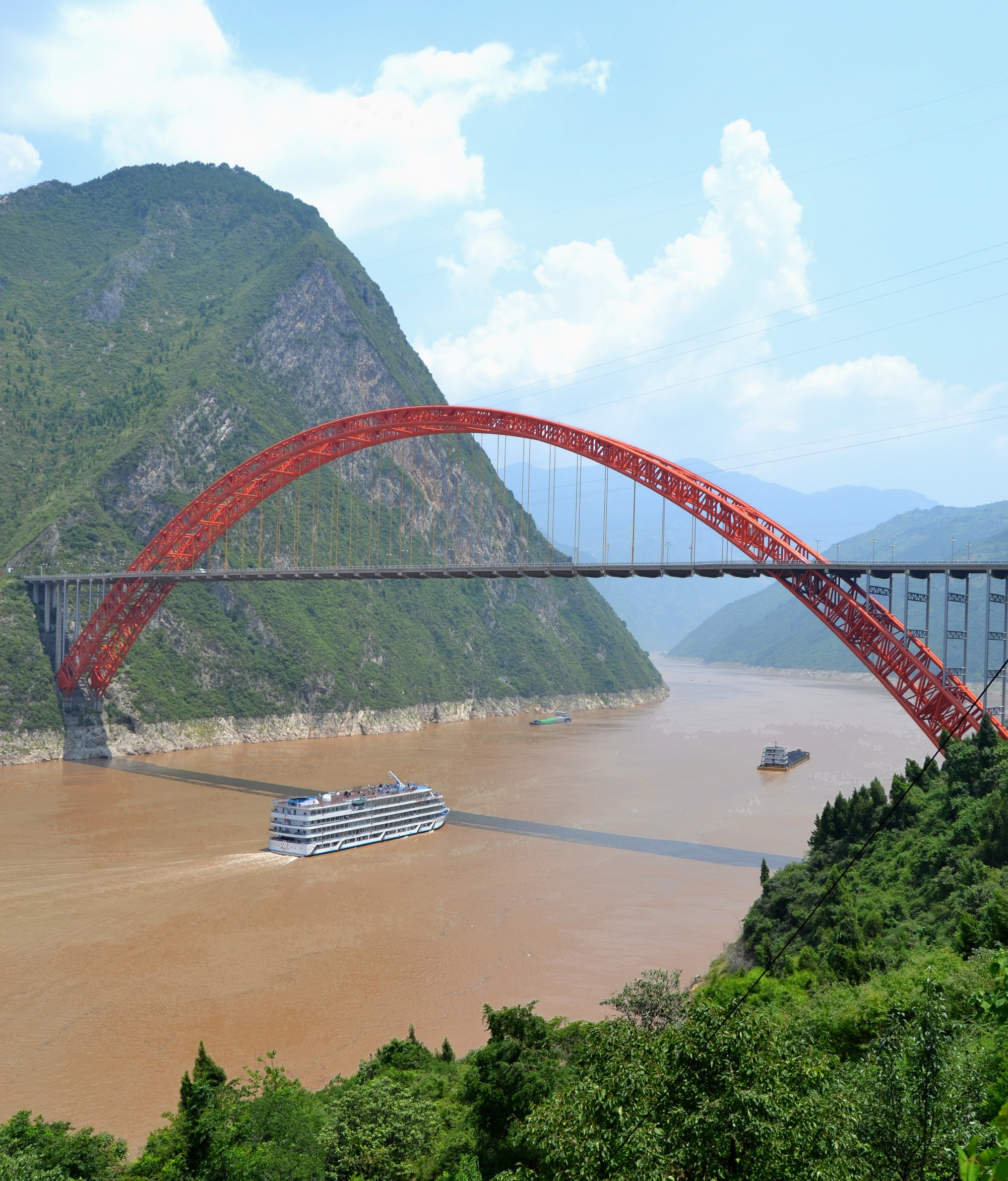
Wushan Yangtze River Bridge

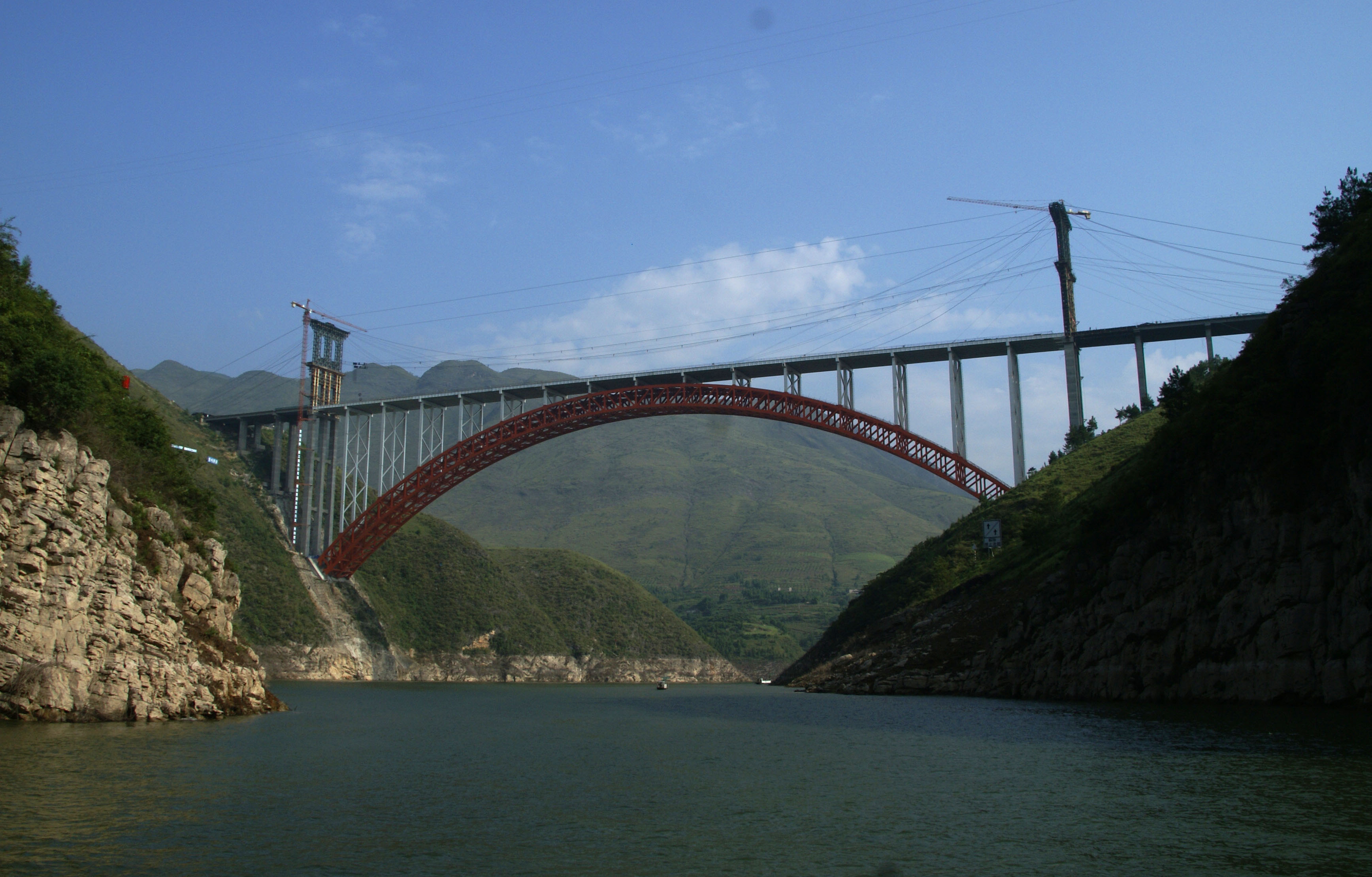
Daninghe River Bridge

The population of the town is something in excess of 100,000, and the main economic activity in the area is coal mining, almost all from very small mines in the surrounding mountains. Tourism also plays a role, although tourist activity is not as great as it was before the flooding of the Gorges in the first decade of the 21st century. The Little Three Gorges are no longer as deep or as spectacular as they once were.

The county is served by Chongqing Wushan Airport which opened in August 2019.

Mount Wushan is located east of the county.

In the novel World War Z, Dachang village was the origin of the virus' patient zero.

== Administrative divisions ==
Two subdistricts:

- Gaotang Subdistrict (高唐街道), Longmen Subdistrict (龙门街道)

Eleven towns:

- Miaoyu (庙宇镇), Dachang (大昌镇), Futian (福田镇), Longxi (龙溪镇), Shuanglong (双龙镇), Guanyang (官阳镇), Luoping (骡坪镇), Baolong, ChongqingBaolong (抱龙镇), Guandu (官渡镇), Tonggu (铜鼓镇), Wuxia (巫峡镇)

Thirteen townships:

- Hongchun Township (红椿土家族乡), Liangping Township (两坪乡), Quchi Township (曲尺乡), Jianping Township (建平乡), Daxi Township (大溪乡), Jinping Township (金坪乡), Pinghe Township (平河乡), Dangyang Township (当阳乡), Zhuxian Township (竹贤乡), Sanxi Township (三溪乡), Peishi Township (培石乡), Duping Township (笃坪乡), Dengjia Township (邓家土家族乡)

== Climate ==
Climate data for Wushan, elevation 276 m (906 ft), (1991–2020 normals, extremes 1981–2010)
Month	Jan	Feb	Mar	Apr	May	Jun	Jul	Aug	Sep	Oct	Nov	Dec	Year
Record high °C (°F)	21.8 (71.2)	27.5 (81.5)	34.3 (93.7)	37.5 (99.5)	40.8 (105.4)	41.9 (107.4)	42.1 (107.8)	42.8 (109.0)	42.2 (108.0)	35.5 (95.9)	26.4 (79.5)	20.7 (69.3)	42.8 (109.0)
Mean daily maximum °C (°F)	10.9 (51.6)	13.6 (56.5)	18.6 (65.5)	24.3 (75.7)	27.9 (82.2)	31.3 (88.3)	34.1 (93.4)	34.3 (93.7)	29.7 (85.5)	23.6 (74.5)	18.3 (64.9)	12.4 (54.3)	23.2 (73.8)
Daily mean °C (°F)	7.5 (45.5)	9.7 (49.5)	13.6 (56.5)	18.8 (65.8)	22.5 (72.5)	26.0 (78.8)	28.6 (83.5)	28.5 (83.3)	24.6 (76.3)	19.1 (66.4)	14.3 (57.7)	9.2 (48.6)	18.5 (65.4)
Mean daily minimum °C (°F)	5.0 (41.0)	7.0 (44.6)	10.0 (50.0)	14.8 (58.6)	18.7 (65.7)	22.2 (72.0)	24.7 (76.5)	24.5 (76.1)	21.1 (70.0)	16.1 (61.0)	11.5 (52.7)	6.9 (44.4)	15.2 (59.4)
Record low °C (°F)	−2.1 (28.2)	−0.2 (31.6)	1.6 (34.9)	3.4 (38.1)	11.4 (52.5)	15.5 (59.9)	18.6 (65.5)	17.2 (63.0)	13.1 (55.6)	5.8 (42.4)	3.1 (37.6)	−3.4 (25.9)	−3.4 (25.9)
Average precipitation mm (inches)	10.9 (0.43)	24.9 (0.98)	42.6 (1.68)	87.5 (3.44)	142.2 (5.60)	143.4 (5.65)	166.7 (6.56)	132.4 (5.21)	108 (4.3)	86.2 (3.39)	46.9 (1.85)	14.9 (0.59)	1,006.6 (39.68)
Average precipitation days (≥ 0.1 mm)	5.4	6.4	10.3	13.4	14.4	12.9	13.0	11.0	10.7	12.3	9.1	6.9	125.8
Average snowy days	1.5	0.5	0.2	0	0	0	0	0	0	0	0	0.3	2.5
Average relative humidity (%)	65	63	63	66	70	71	71	67	68	72	71	69	68
Mean monthly sunshine hours	74.1	71.9	111.9	133.7	144.4	156.7	194.1	202.6	147.8	117.1	101.7	76.5	1,532.5
Percentage possible sunshine	23	23	30	34	34	37	45	50	40	34	32	24	34
Source: China Meteorological Administration

== See also ==
- Wushan Man
