= Three Gorges =

Natural gorges along the Yangtze River

Coordinates: 31°01′04″N 110°13′43″E

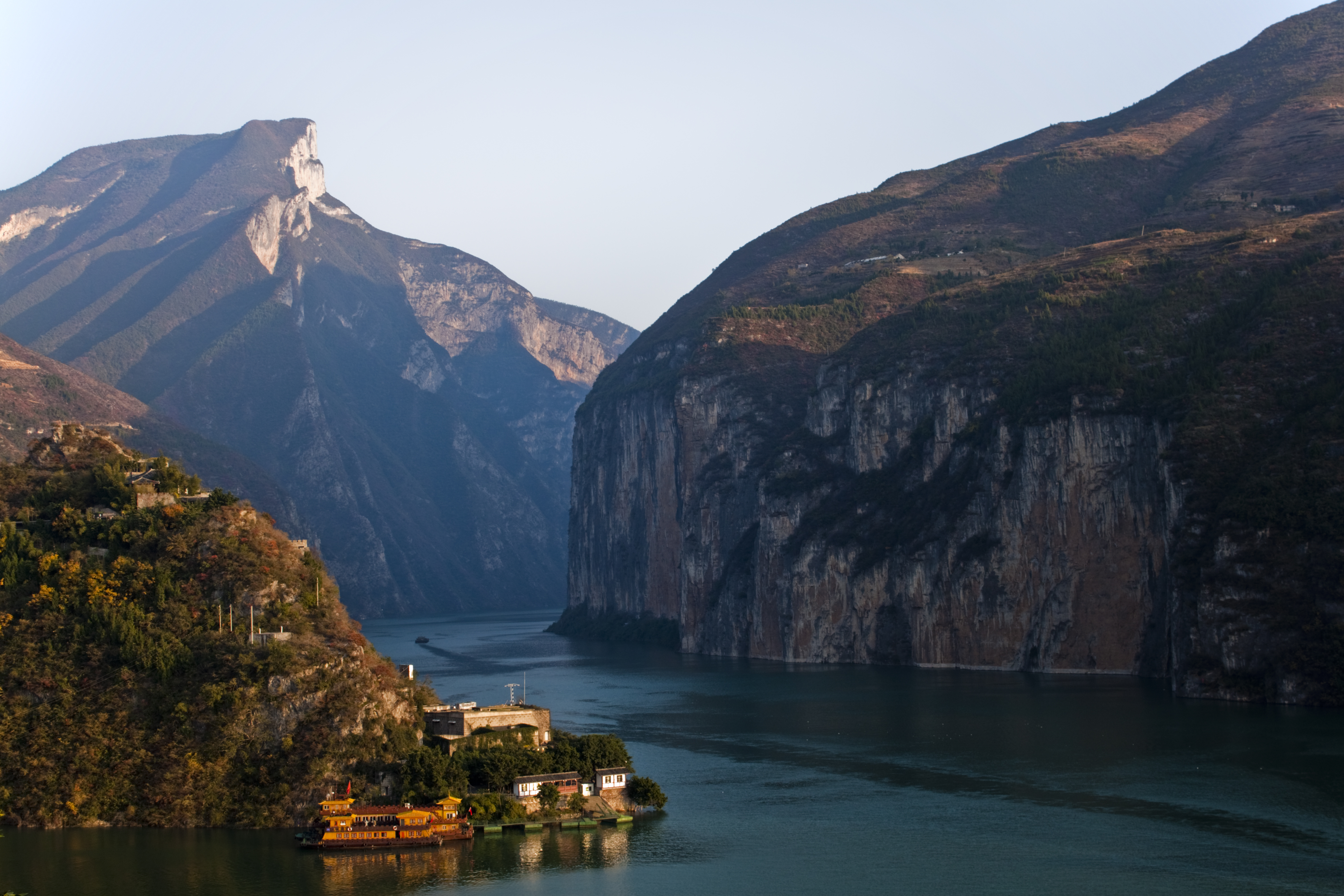
- Qutang Gorge in 2009
- Elevation: 440 feet (130 m)
- Traversed by: Yangtze River

Third Approach
- Location: Hubei/Chongqing, China
- Range: Wu Mountains

Three Gorges
- Simplified Chinese: 三峡
- Traditional Chinese: 三峽
Transcriptions
Standard Mandarin
- Hanyu Pinyin: Sānxiá
- Wade–Giles: San^{1}-hsia^{2}
- IPA: [sán.ɕjǎ]
Yue: Cantonese
- Jyutping: Saam^{1}-haap^{6}
- IPA: [sam˥ hap̚˨]
Southern Min
- Tâi-lô: Sam-kiap

The Three Gorges (simplified Chinese: 三峡; traditional Chinese: 三峽; pinyin: Sānxiá) are three adjacent and sequential gorges along the middle reaches of the Yangtze River, in the hinterland of the People's Republic of China, known for their scenery.

The Three Gorges—comprising the Qutang, followed by the Wu, and finally the Xiling gorges—span 193 miles (311 km), beginning at Baidicheng of Chongqing in the west and ending at Nanjin Pass at Yichang City, Hubei Province in the east, between which are the Fengjie and Wushan counties of Chongqing, as well as Badong and Zigui counties of Hubei Province.

== Region ==
=== Course of the Yangtze ===
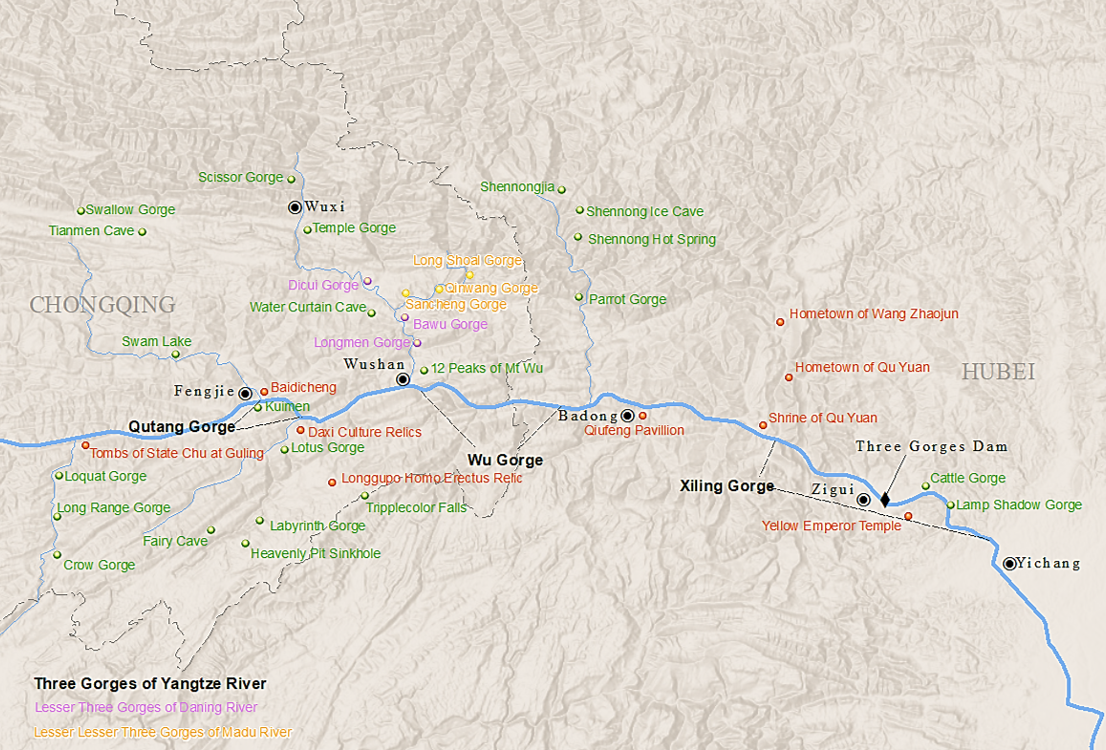
Map of the Three Gorges

After arriving at Yibin, in Sichuan Province, the Yangtze River flows from Jiangjin, Chongqing Municipality, to Yichang, Hubei Province; and this section of the river is called Chuanjiang, or "the river of Sichuan". In the past, it was the only waterway that connected Sichuan and Guizhou to China's eastern area. (The Wu River flows past Guizhou and empties into the Yangtze River at Fuling, of Chongqing Municipality). Downstream, the Chuanjiang passes the Wu Mountains, which form the Qutang Gorge, the Wu Gorge, and the Xiling Gorge along the Yangtze River, collectively known as the Three Gorges.

=== The region ===
The Three Gorges span from the western, upriver, town of Fengjie, in Chongqing Municipality, to the east, downstream, city of Yichang, in Hubei province. The Three Gorges Reservoir Region is approximately 200 km (120 mi) in length, while the Three Gorges themselves occupy about 120 km (75 mi) within this region: this has attracted global attention to the Three Gorges Dam and changed the culture and environment of the region.

Although it is primarily famous for its scenery, the Three Gorges region is historically and culturally important in China. Many settlements and archaeological sites were submerged by the upstream reservoir of the Three Gorges Dam.

=== Three Gorges ===
Gorge	Chinese	Length (km)	Range
Qutang Gorge	瞿塘峡	8	from Baidicheng (Fengjie) to Daxi
Wu Gorge	巫峡	45	from Wushan to Guandukou (Badong)
Xiling Gorge	西陵峡	66	from Zigui to Nanjin Pass (Yichang)

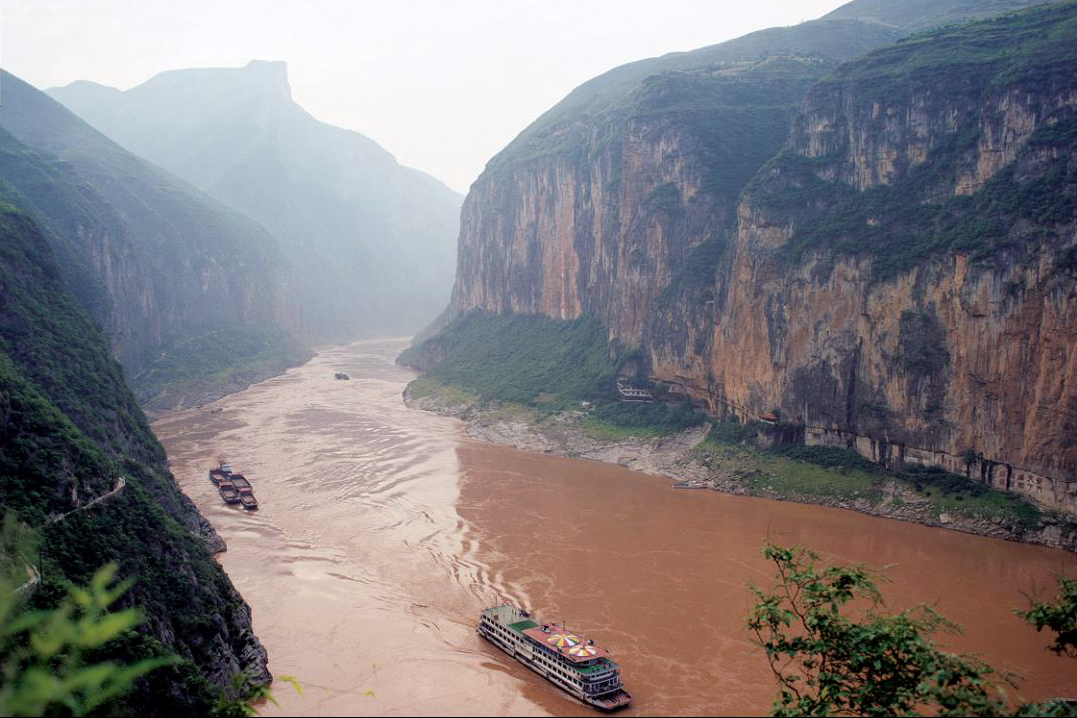
Qutang Gorge in 1999, prior to the completion of the Three Gorges Dam

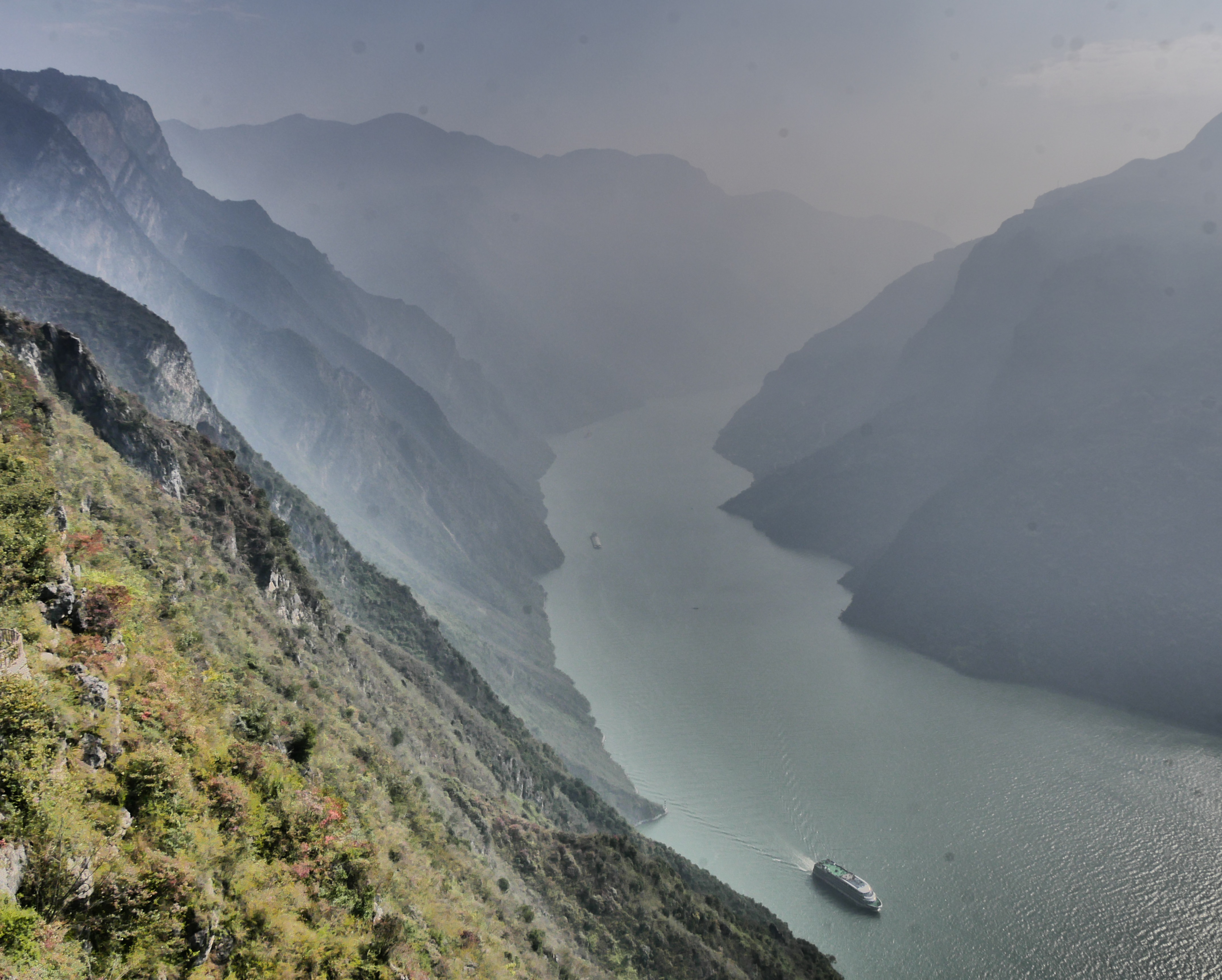
Wu Gorge in 2019

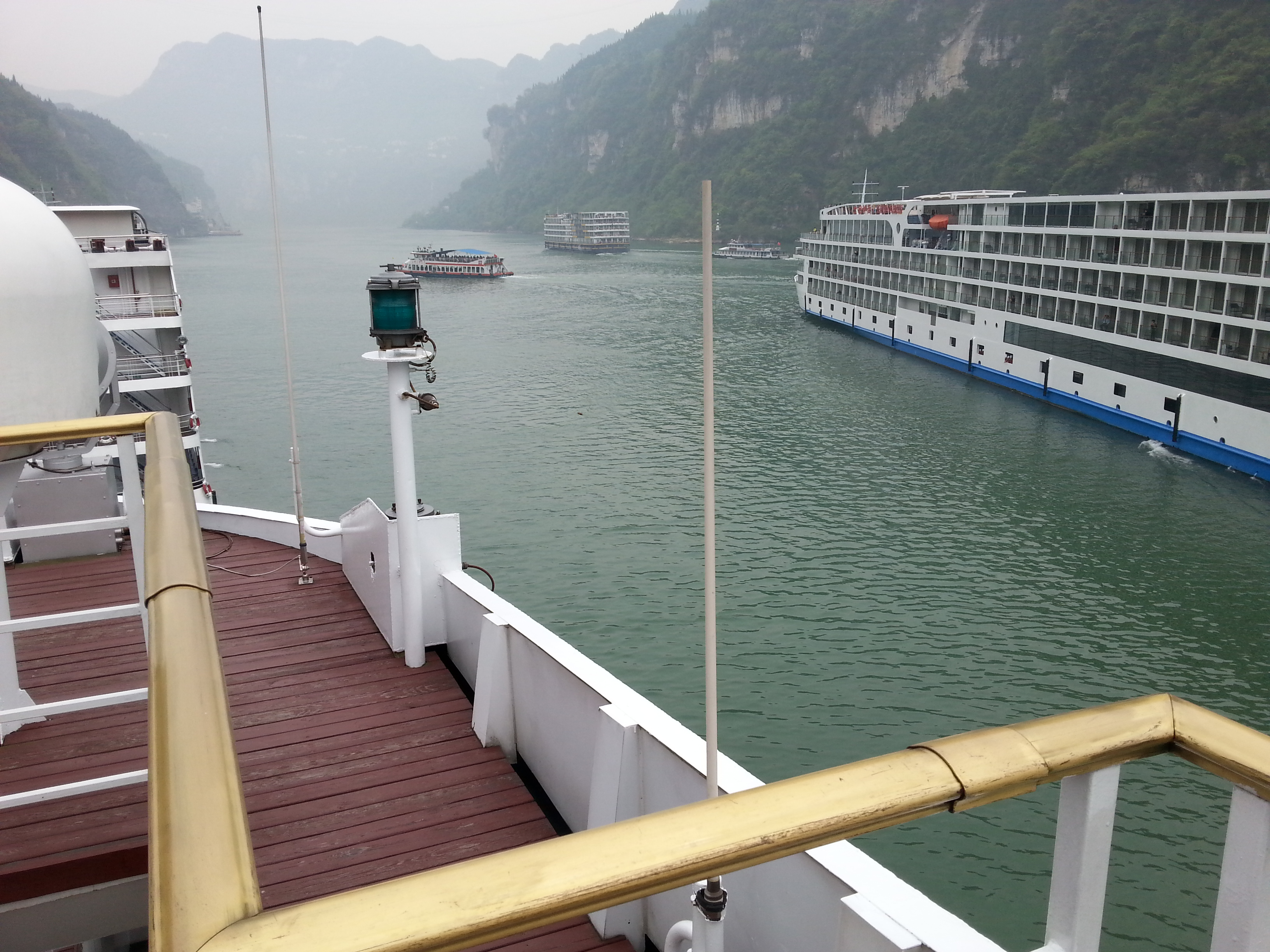
Cruise boats along Xiling Gorge

== Geological evolution ==
Due to the lithological conditions of its different regions, the valleys of the Three Gorges are narrow in some areas and broad in others. Most narrow valleys occur in regions where there is limestone, which is relatively hard and resists erosion. However, water can flow along deep vertical fractures, eroding underneath. As the limestone bed is gradually undercut, parts of it fall into the river along vertical fractures, forming precipitous cliffs. When the river flows through areas of softer sandstone and shale, which have less resistance to erosion, the erosive effect is increased, carving wide valleys.

There are different theories on how the Three Gorges were formed, but geographers and geologists have generally reached a consensus, believing mountain folding in the east of Sichuan Province and the west of Hubei Province, including the Wu Mountains (巫山), were the outcome of the Yanshanian movement (燕山運動) around 70 million years ago. The gorges run from southwest to northeast, then turn, and from west to east, with terrain lowering gradually from south to north. The western and eastern parts of the area, between the southern mountains and Bashan Mountain (巴山), in the north, are comparatively lower; and in the past, the river flowed to the east through the region. As the crust of the locality continued to rise, the river's erosion intensified, and the Three Gorges were carved.

== Scenic grandeur ==
The natural beauty of the Three Gorges along the Yangtze River has been appreciated for hundreds of years. In the Northern Wei (北魏) dynasty (386–534 AD), Li Daoyuan (酈道元) described them in his work, Commentary on the Water Classic (水經注).

There are seamless mountains on both sides of the Three Gorges stretching more than 200 miles. The overlapping rocks make up layers of barriers that shield against sky and sunshine so that the sun can only be seen at noon and the moon will merely show at midnight. In summers, water rises to lofty mountains, making all boats floating along or against the river get blocked. Suppose an empire has an urgent decree to issue from Baidi, it will reach Jiangling at sunset of the day. The distance between them is about 373 miles, and neither a galloping horse nor a flight can run faster than a boat.

Yuan Shansong (袁山松) of the Eastern Jin dynasty wrote a Record of Yichuan's Landscape, which depicts the Three Gorges' grandeur. He wrote,

People were always warned literally or orally of the Gorges' swift currents, saying they are horrific, and no one praised the local landscape [as] beautiful. It's [not] till I came to the site that I felt quite gleeful and started to understand seeing is believing. The overlapping cliffs, the elegant peaks and the grotesque structures, they all constitute the scenery far from expression. The lush, solemn woods stood erected in the cloudy air. I can raise up my head to appreciate what's above, and look down to see reflections, and the more acquainted I get with this place, the better I feel. I spent two nights there, forgetting to return. I had never seen such a scene, nor had I any similar experience. So I am cheerful to see such a wonder, I feel mountains and waters all had spirits, and I am thrilled to encounter this bosom friend after seeking so long.

In his poem Setting out from Baidicheng, Li Bai (李白) depicts this place, saying,

While monkeys keep howling at both sides of the river, the boat has swiftly passed thousands of mountains.

Between winter and spring, the shadows of rocks and woods are reflected in the green pool accompanied by white, swift currents. Cascades plunge and flow across cypresses increasing at extremely high peaks. Clean water, flourishing trees, lofty mountains and luxuriant grasses compose the landscape. When the sun starts to rise or frost falls in the morning, forests and streams are chilly and solemn, and one can often hear monkeys howling from peaks. Their cries sound sad and strange and last in the valleys for quite a while, because of that, local fishers think the Wu Gorge is the longest of the Three Gorges in the east of Sichuan province.

The Three Gorges have renowned scenic spots, such as the Kuimen (夔門), located at the western entrance to the Three Gorges. The cliffs on both sides appear to some as having been cut by knives or axes. Among the Wu Mountains that are located at the northern and southern beaches of the Wu Gorge, one of the twelve peaks is known as Fairy Peak. According to folk tradition, it symbolizes a fairy who assisted Yu the Great in controlling the waters and guiding boatmen. The Xiling Gorge comprises a series of famous gorges, including Military Book and Sword Gorge, Yellow Cow Gorge, and Lantern's Shadow Gorge.

== Transportation ==
Shipbuilding and navigation advances in the Tang and Song dynasties allowed regular transport through the Three Gorges, but shipping volume was low until the resettlement of Sichuan in the 1600s. By the late 1700s, each year 210,000,000 kg (460,000,000 lb) of grain was rowed downstream and cargo two-thirds that amount was manually towed upstream. Passage was dangerous and worsened by erosion caused by agriculture along the slopes. There were government and private projects to improve safety, especially during the 1700s and 1800s, by carving signs and towpaths, removing dangerous rocks and filling in whirlpools, and establishing pilot, lifeboat, and cargo recovery stations. Even after the introduction of motorized boats, manual labor was still used to some extent until the 1970s.

== Hydroelectric development ==
=== Hydroelectric projects ===
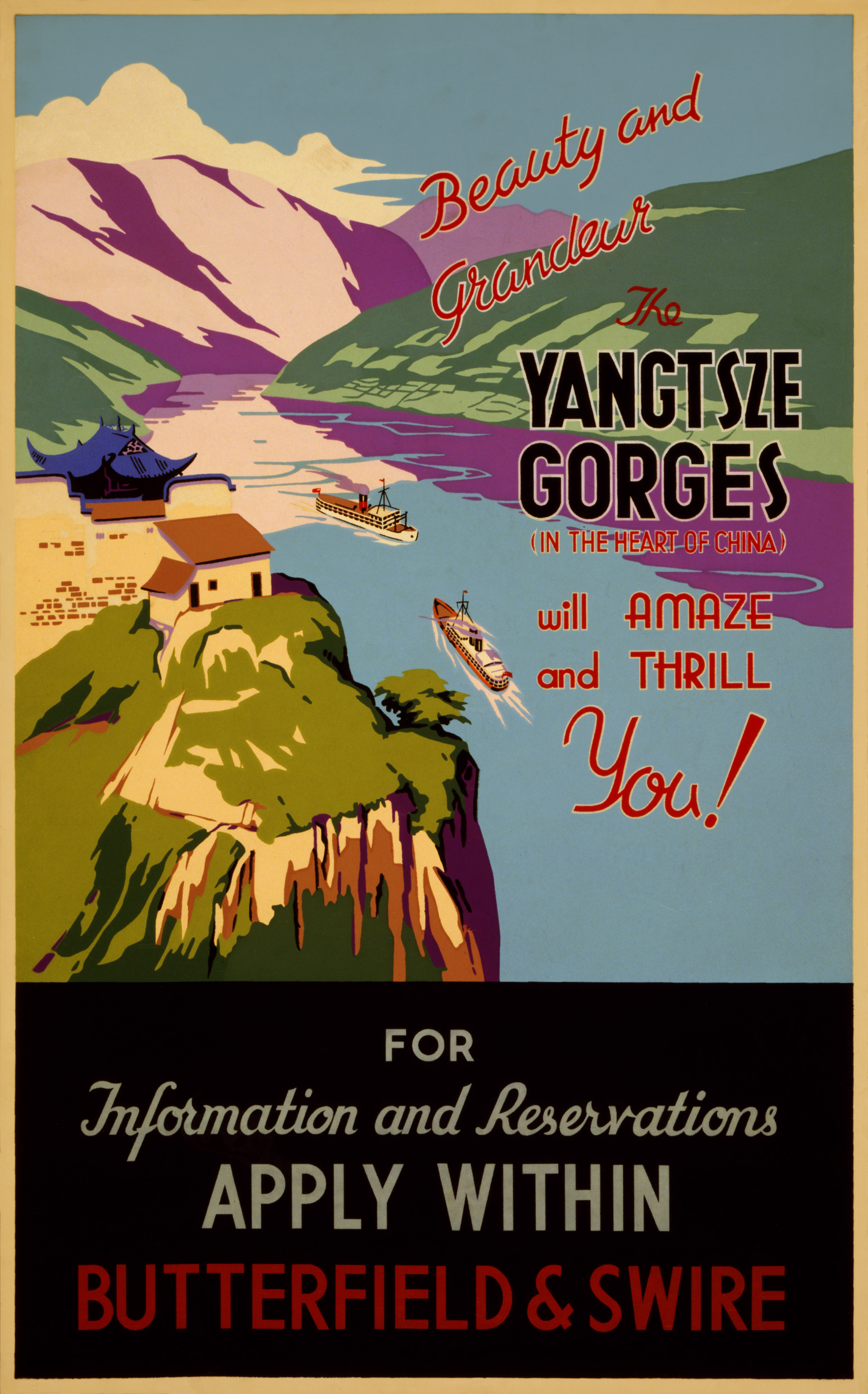
Travel poster for the Three Gorges Region (circa 1930).

In 1919, after Sun Yat-sen had put forward the concept in the Plan for Industrial Development of his Founding Strategy (建国方略), experts investigated damming the Three Gorges, but it was not until 1994 that the Three Gorges project officially started.

In 1944, the Nationalist government recruited John L. Savage, the Chief Engineer of the United States Bureau of Reclamation, who came to China and made a 10-day investigation of the Three Gorges. Afterwards, he wrote an enthusiastic report on the prospects of a dam. Construction was started on the first of the dams at Upper Tsing Yuan Tung, but was halted on August 15, 1947, because of the Chinese Civil War.

In February 1958, as the expanded meeting of the Political Bureau of the CPC Central Committee was held at Nanning (南宁), the Three Gorges Project (三峡工程) was discussed for the first time, and fierce disputes broke out. In the end, this project was delayed. Over the following three decades, people continued to discuss it. In the early 1980s, people mentioned it once again, but after repeated discussions and investigations, it was again postponed. On March 6, 1992, a feasibility report was presented at the 5th Session of the 7th National People's Congress (NPC) for discussion and resolution. On April 3 of that year, the NPC voted on a resolution for the dam, and it was passed with an unusually low approval rate for the NPC with only 1767 of the 2633 members (67.11%) voting to support the dam.

=== Three Gorges Dam ===
The Three Gorges Dam was constructed at Sandouping, Yichang in Hubei Province, in the middle of Xiling Gorge. On May 20, 2006, the reservoir dam was completed, and the water level quickly reached the initial level of 110 meters (360 ft) above the downstream river. The project was completed by the end of 2008, with a ship lift completed in 2015.

Both the dam and the Three Gorges Reservoir has had a massive impact on the region's ecology and people, involving the mass relocation of towns and villages. The higher water level has changed the scenery of the Three Gorges so that the river is wider and the mountains appear lower. However, the mountains still tower above the river, and the gorges continue to offer views of the surrounding cliffs.

The riverboat companies operating on the Three Gorges are experiencing an increase in demand for river cruises. The increased width and depth of the river permits larger ships through the gorges, and there has been a significant increase in river traffic of all kinds, including bulk cargo and container barges.

== Threatened cultural sites ==
- The "Baiheliang hydrographic mark"—In 763, during the Guangde period of the Tang dynasty emperor Daizong, people discovered about 165 paragraphs of an inscription with almost 30,000 characters. There are 18 carps carved in the stone along with the inscription, and they were used as hydrographic markers to record water fluctuations during low-water periods, to forecast agricultural outcomes. According to an initial estimate, after the reservoir is filled by the Three Gorges Dam, parts of Baiheliang, with 20 years of records, would be submerged. In 2001, Ge Xiurun, a member of the Chinese Academy of Sciences proposed to use an "unstressed container" to safeguard the original site underneath the water and to construct tunnels to connect it to the ground above so that visitors can have access. Eventually these proposals would lead to the Baiheliang Underwater Museum.
- Shibaozhai, or the Precious Stone Fortress, is located in Shibao Town (石宝镇), of Zhong County of Chongqing Municipality. Built between 1796 and 1820, during the reign of Qing Emperor Jiaqing, these 35-meter-high (115 ft) buildings represent high-rise column-and-tie constructions of the south of China. When the Three Gorges project began, a dam was built around this fortress for its protection.
- The Zhang Fei Temple, of Yunyang County of Chongqing, constructed no later than the Song dynasty, stood on the south bank of the Yangtze River in the northern foothills of the Feng Fei Mountains. Being close to the Yangtze River it was flooded more than once. The present temple is that which was repaired during the reigns of emperors Tongzhi and Guangxu of the Qing dynasty. The area of the temple complex is 2,000 m^{2} (22,000 sq ft). A large number of calligraphy and paintings, stone inscriptions and woodcarvings from the Tang and Song dynasties, such as the first and second odes on The Red Cliffs (赤壁賦) by Su Shih, have been saved. Since the temple's elevation was between 130 and 160 meters (430 and 520 ft), and it would have been submerged when the Three Gorges reservoir reached 175 meters (570 ft), the Zhang Fei Temple was relocated in its entirety.

After the construction of the Three Gorges Dam was approved, archaeologists were allowed time and resources to carry out rescue work. However, after the dam was built and used to store water, a large number of cultural relics, including hanging coffins and stone inscriptions that cannot be protected, were covered by the reservoir.

== See also ==
- Chinese yuan note — the westernmost gorge image is on the ten yuan note.
- Three Gorges Locks
- Three Gorges Museum
