= Xia =

Xia (Hsia in Wade–Giles) may refer to:

== Chinese history ==
- Xia dynasty (c. 2070 – c. 1600 BC), the first orthodox dynasty in Chinese history
- Xia (Sixteen Kingdoms) (407–431), a Xiongnu-led dynasty
- Xia (617–621), a state founded by Dou Jiande near the end of the Sui dynasty
- Western Xia (1038–1227), a Tangut-led dynasty
- Eastern Xia (1215–1233), a Jurchen-led dynasty
- Ming Xia (1362–1371), a short-lived dynasty that existed during the late Yuan dynasty period

== People ==
- Huaxia or Xia, an ancient ethnic group later known as the Han Chinese
- Xia (surname), a Chinese surname
- Xia Brookside (born 1998), English professional wrestler
- Xia Vigor (born 2009), British-Filipino actress
- XIA (Junsu), a Korean pop artist also known as Xiah and Junsu
- Xia, the former stage name of Korean pop artist Jang Jin Young, formerly of RaNiA

== Other uses ==
- Xia (philosophy), a Chinese philosophy somewhat like the chivalrous code of European knights
- Xia County, Shanxi, China
- Xiafs, a file system developed for the Linux operating system together with the Ext2 file system
- Xia class submarine, a Chinese ballistic missile submarine
- BYD Xia, a minivan produced by BYD Auto named after the Xia dynasty
- XIA, the ICAO Code for Irving Oil, Canada
- Xia, a place in the fictional Bionicle universe
- Xia, a hero or knight-errant in Chinese fiction, see wuxia

== See also ==
- Sia (disambiguation)
- Kia (disambiguation)
