= Daning River (Guangxi) =

Coordinates: 24°15′00″N 111°36′00″E

Location
- Country: China
- Region: Guangxi

Daning River (Chinese: 大宁河), is a river in the Chinese province of Guangxi.
