= Xiling Gorge =

Gorge on the Yangtze River in Hubei, China

- Traditional Chinese: 西陵峽
- Simplified Chinese: 西陵峡
- Postal: Siling Gorge
Transcriptions
Standard Mandarin
- Hanyu Pinyin: Xīlíng Xiá
- Wade–Giles: Hsi^{1}-ling^{2} Hsia^{2}

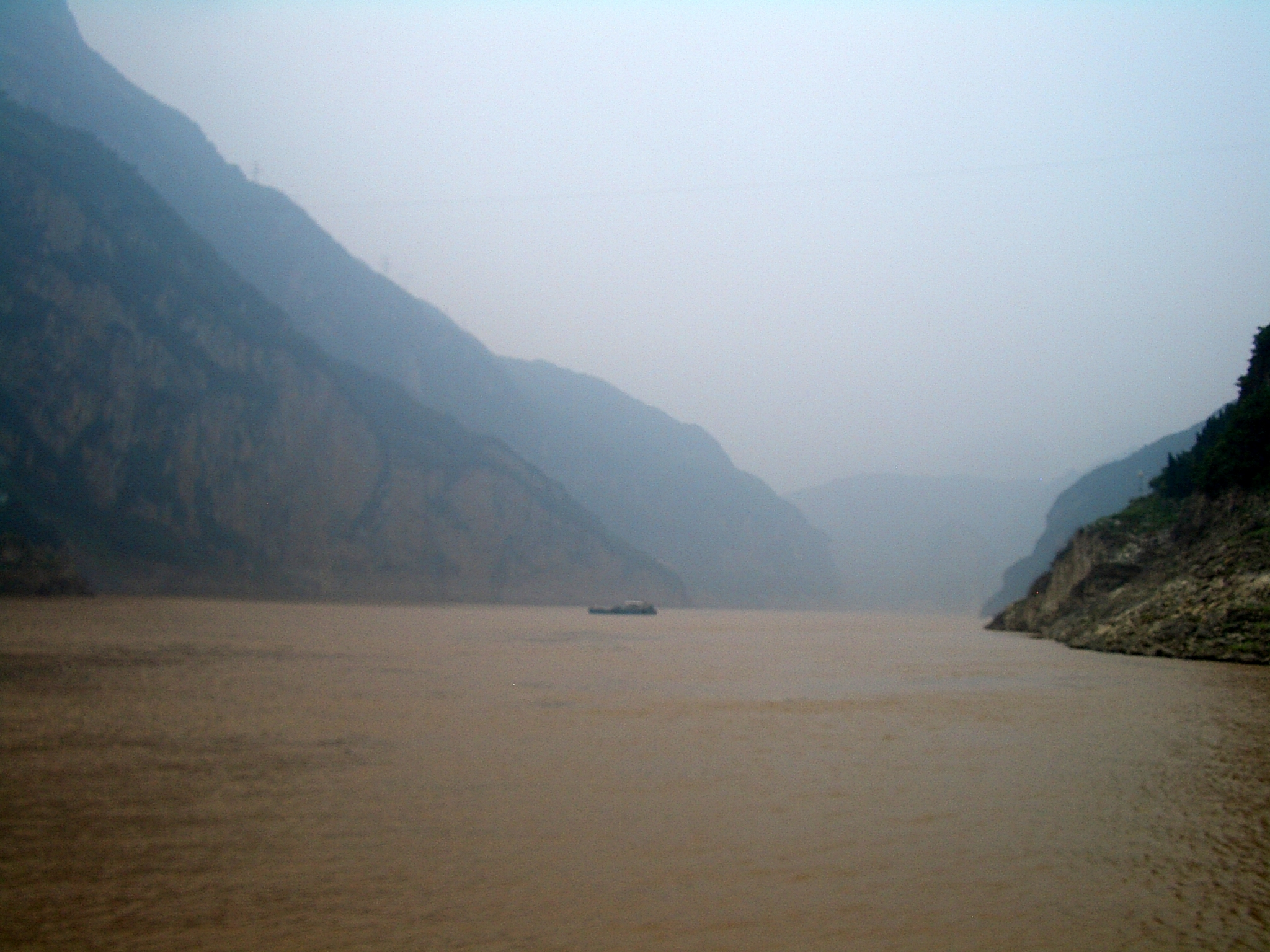
On the Yangtze River (Chang Jiang) in Zigui County, upstream from Maoping.

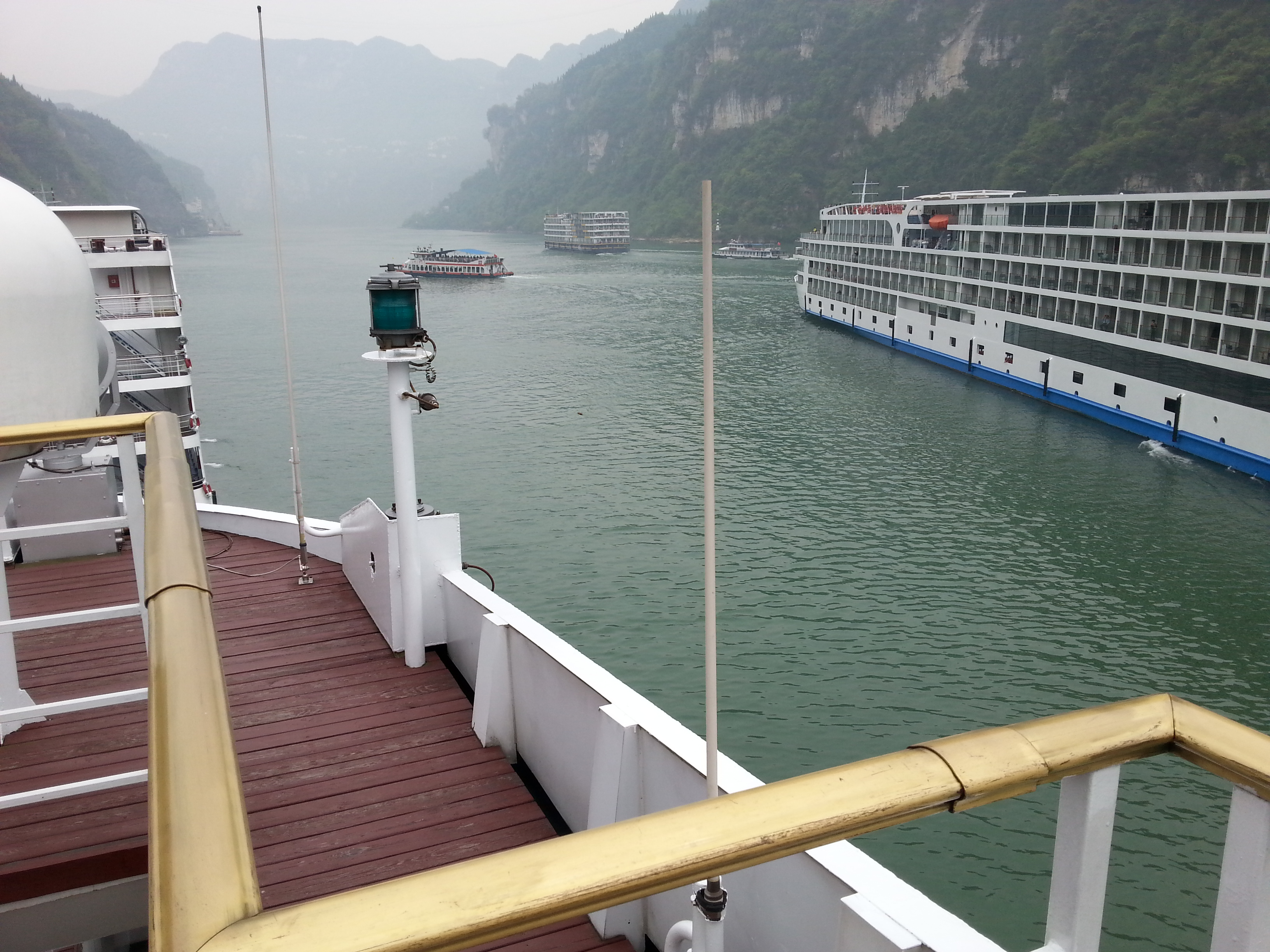
Cruise boats along Xiling Gorge

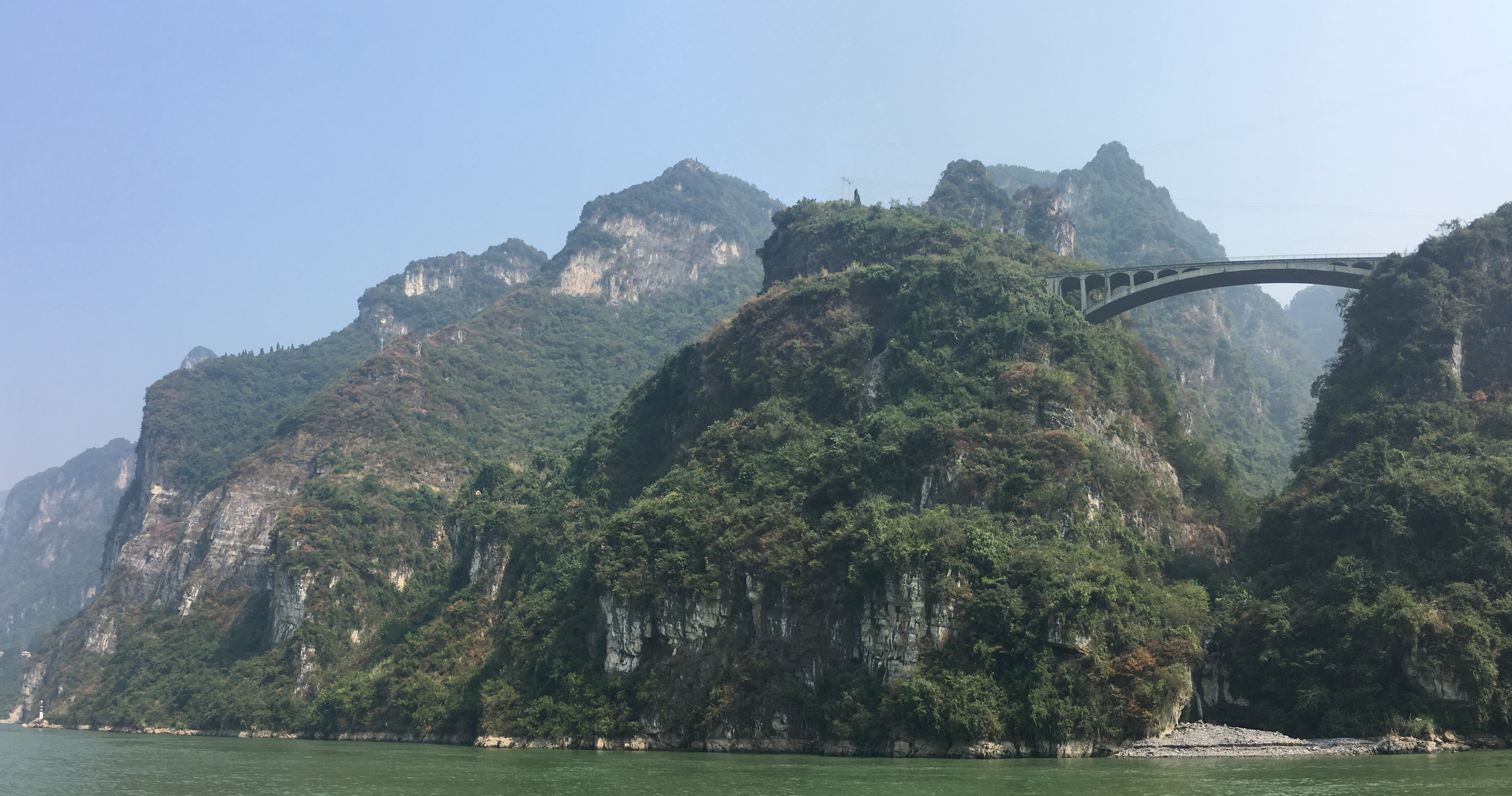
View from the river

Xiling Gorge (simplified Chinese: 西陵峡; traditional Chinese: 西陵峽; pinyin: Xīlíng Xiá) is a gorge on the Yangtze River (Chang Jiang) in Hubei province, China. It is the easternmost and largest of the Three Gorges.

== Geography ==
Xiling Gorge is located in Zigui County and Yiling District, in the west of Hubei province, from Xiangxi down to the western suburbs of Yichang. Xiangxi village is located in Zigui County, at the fall of the stream of the same name into the river, between Guizhou Town and Quyuan Town.

The area is named after Mt. Xiling, a peak at the eastern end of the gorge, and has been so named since at least the Three Kingdoms period when it was recorded in the geographical treatise Shui Jing Zhu.

Xiling, which forms nearly half the length of the entire Three Gorges region, is actually a series of four different gorges: Precious Sword; Horse Lung and Ox Liver; Soundless Bell; and Shadow Play Gorges.

== Three Gorges Dam ==
The Three Gorges Dam was constructed at Sandouping in the middle of the Xiling Gorge. Before the construction of the Three Gorges Dam and Gezhouba Dam, Xiling was known for being the most dangerous of the three gorges to travel through, with frightening whirlpools and strong rapids.

Since the construction of the dams, the river's depth has increased from 3 metres (9.8 ft) in some areas below the dam, to well over 100 metres (330 ft) throughout the reservoir's length.
