= Baidicheng =

Ancient fortress and temple complex

Coordinates: 31.0432°N 109.5703°E

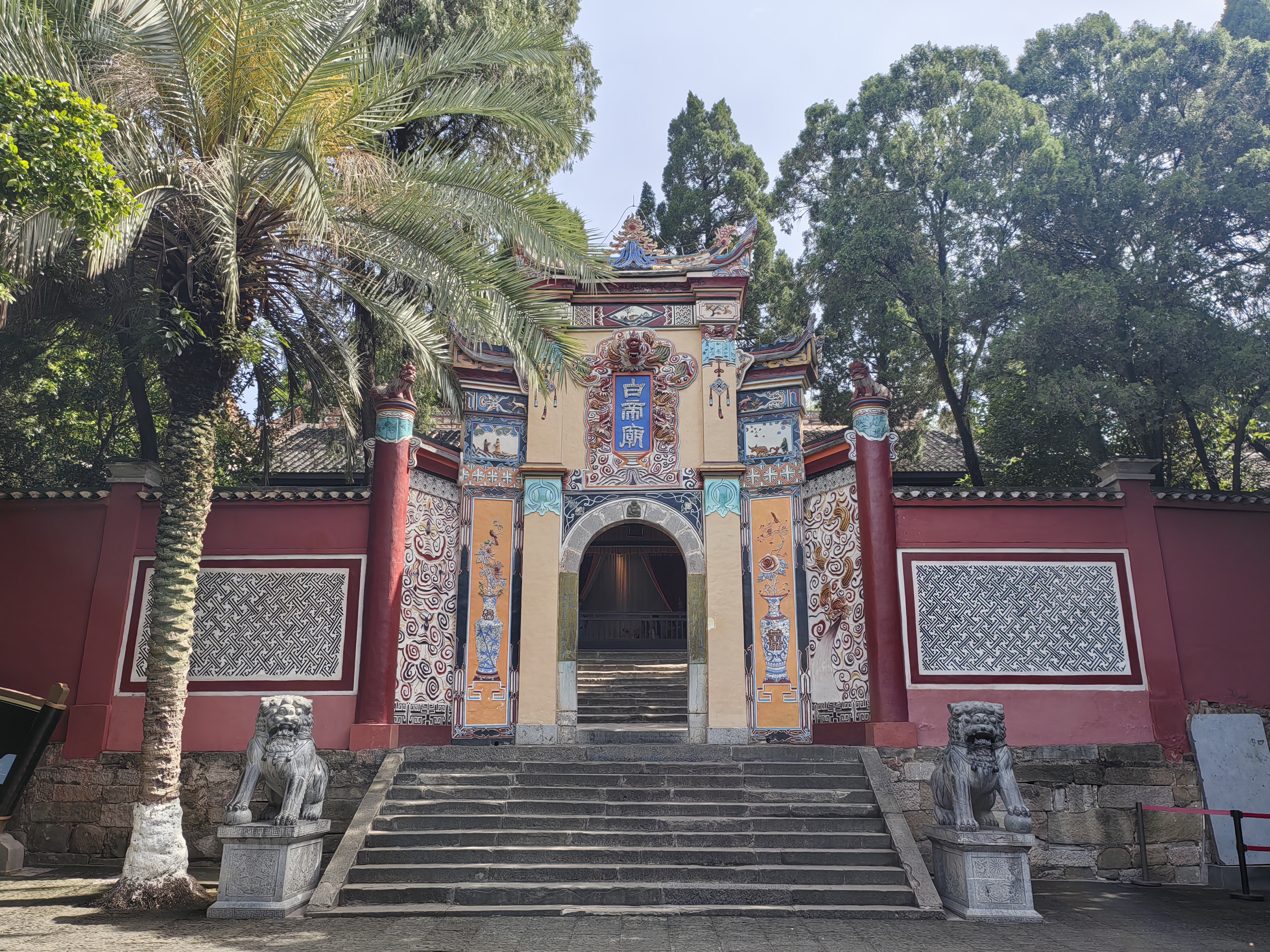
- Chinese: 白帝城
Transcriptions
Standard Mandarin
- Hanyu Pinyin: Báidìchéng
- Wade–Giles: Paiticheng

Baidicheng or Baidi Fortress (lit. White Emperor City) is an ancient fortress and temple complex on a hill on the northern shore of the Yangtze River in China, 8 km east of the present day Fengjie County seat in Chongqing municipality.

== Overview ==
The name Baidicheng literally means White Emperor City. It has been said that the area was once surrounded with a white mist, giving it a look which was rather mysterious, yet serene—much as what an emperor should be like. It has also been said that someone saw a white dragon, the symbol of the Emperor appear there, that the warlord Gongsun Shu thought this was a fortuitous sign, and so declared himself Emperor of Chengjia. Thus Gongsun was said to have founded the city, and so called himself "the White Emperor".

The temple complex is now on an island, due to raised water levels following the construction of the Three Gorges Dam. Many older structures were submerged, and new buildings have been built higher up. The temple complex island is linked to the north bank of the Yangtze, by a bridge. The island continues to be a tourist attraction, with many cruise ships halting for tours at Fengjie.

Baidi is also known as the "City of Poems", because so many poets such as Li Bai wrote about it (see: "Departing from Baidi in the Morning"). Another famous and talented poet, Du Fu, resided in Baidi for 2 or 3 years.

Liu Bei, the first emperor of the Shu Han during the Three Kingdoms era, is said to have died in Baidi, although, according to Records of the Three Kingdoms, Liu Bei died at his palace of Yong'angong. The site of Yong'angong was located in what is now inside of the Normal School of Fengjie County, a few miles away from the current Baidicheng. Thus, as in other cases, the location of an ancient place is not necessarily the same as the location of a modern town with the same name.

In 2006, the Chinese government established Baidi Fortress as a national heritage site.

== Gallery ==
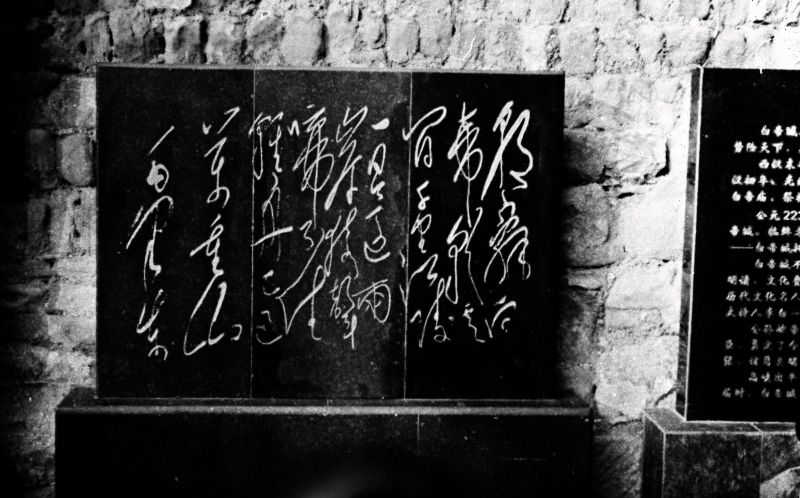
A bronze plaque of Li Bai's poem, with Mao Zedong's calligraphy.

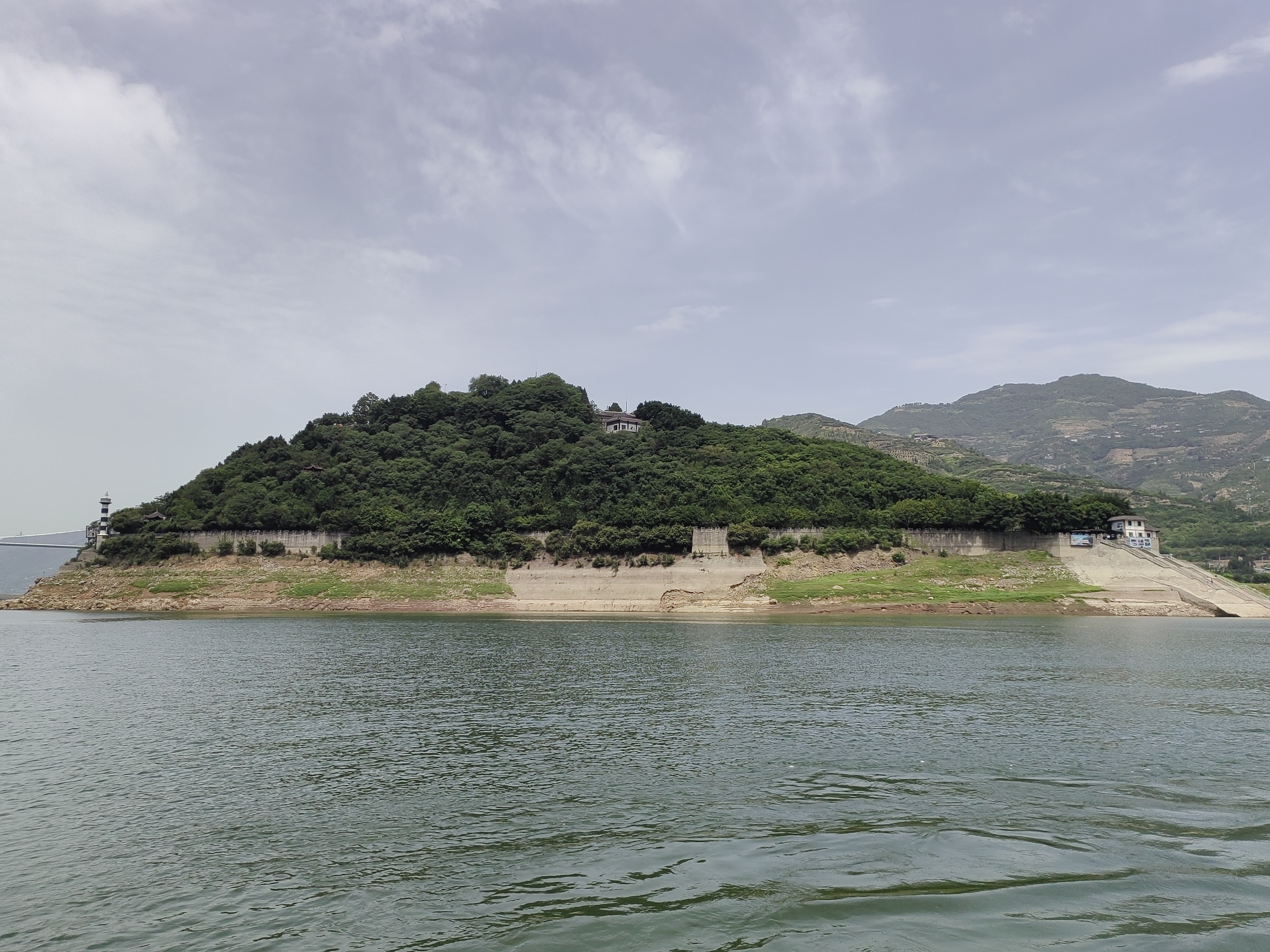
View of Baidicheng from cruise ship.

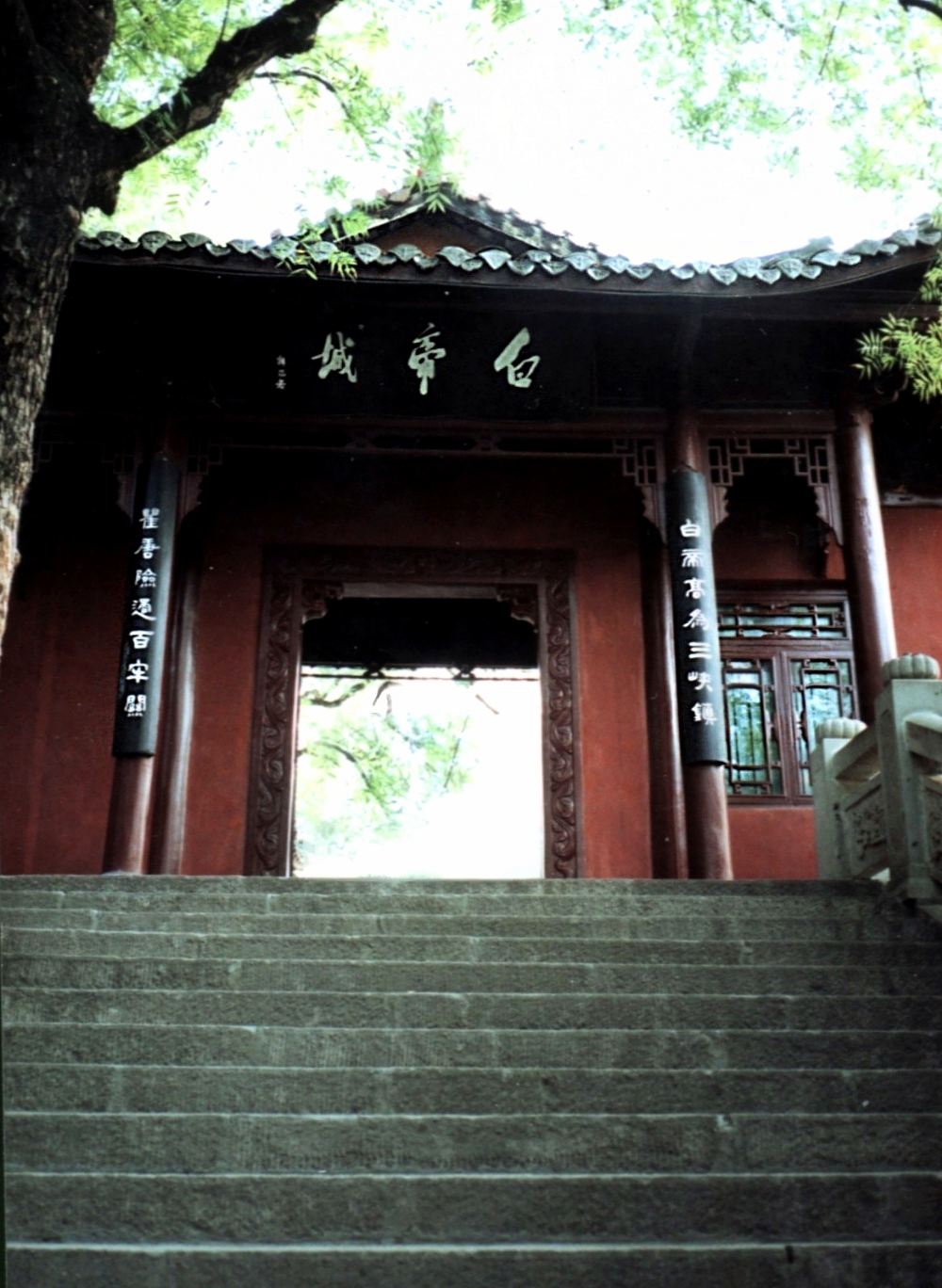
Entrance

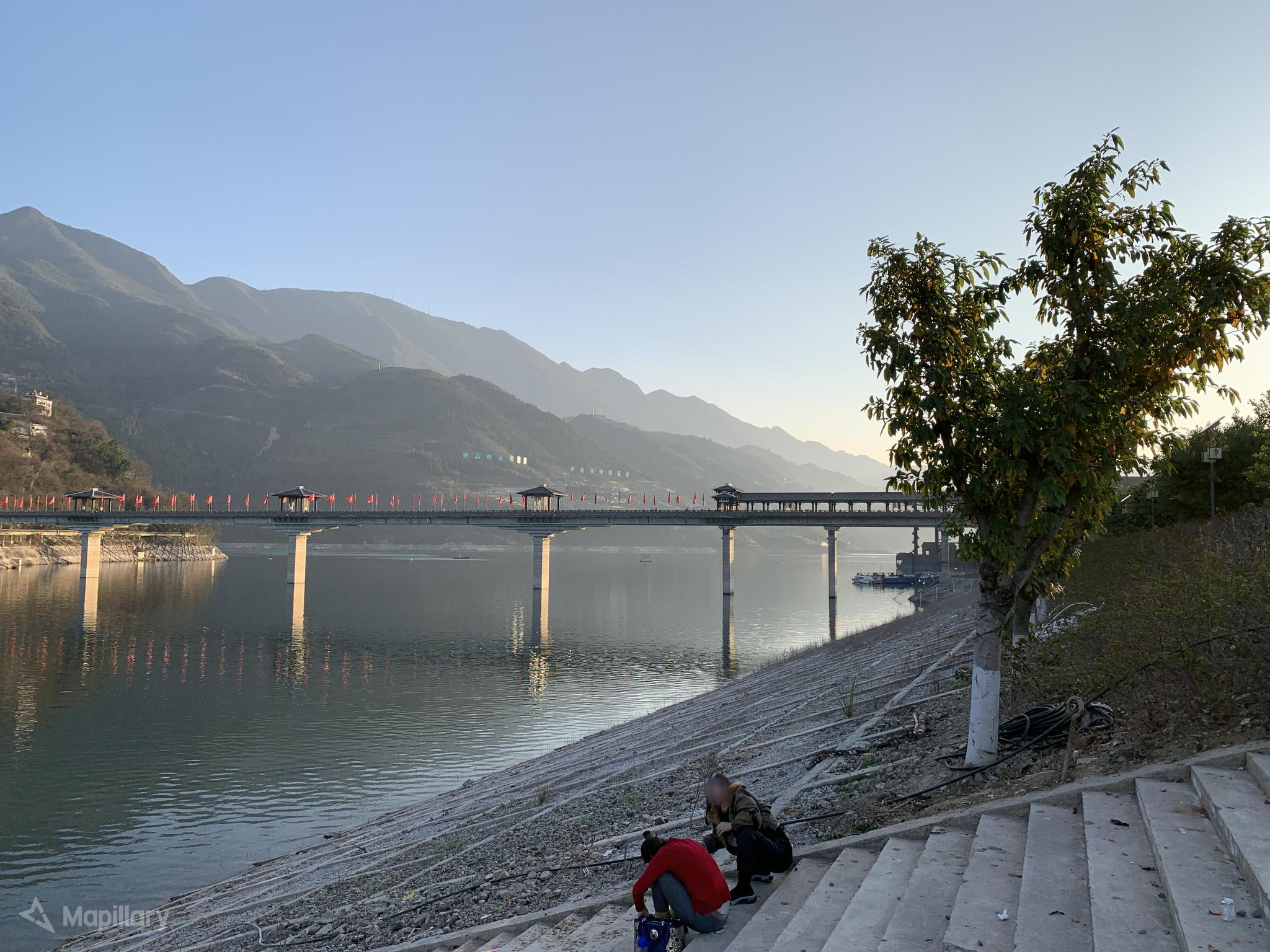
View of the bridge connecting Baidicheng and the mainland

== See also ==
- Simians (Chinese poetry)
