= Daning River (Chongqing) =

Coordinates: 31°4′23″N 109°53′15″E

Location
- Country: China

Physical characteristics
- Source
  - location: Yangtze River

Daning River (Chinese: 大宁河) is a river in the Chinese municipality of Chongqing.
