= Taipingxi =

Taipingxi 太平溪镇
- Town
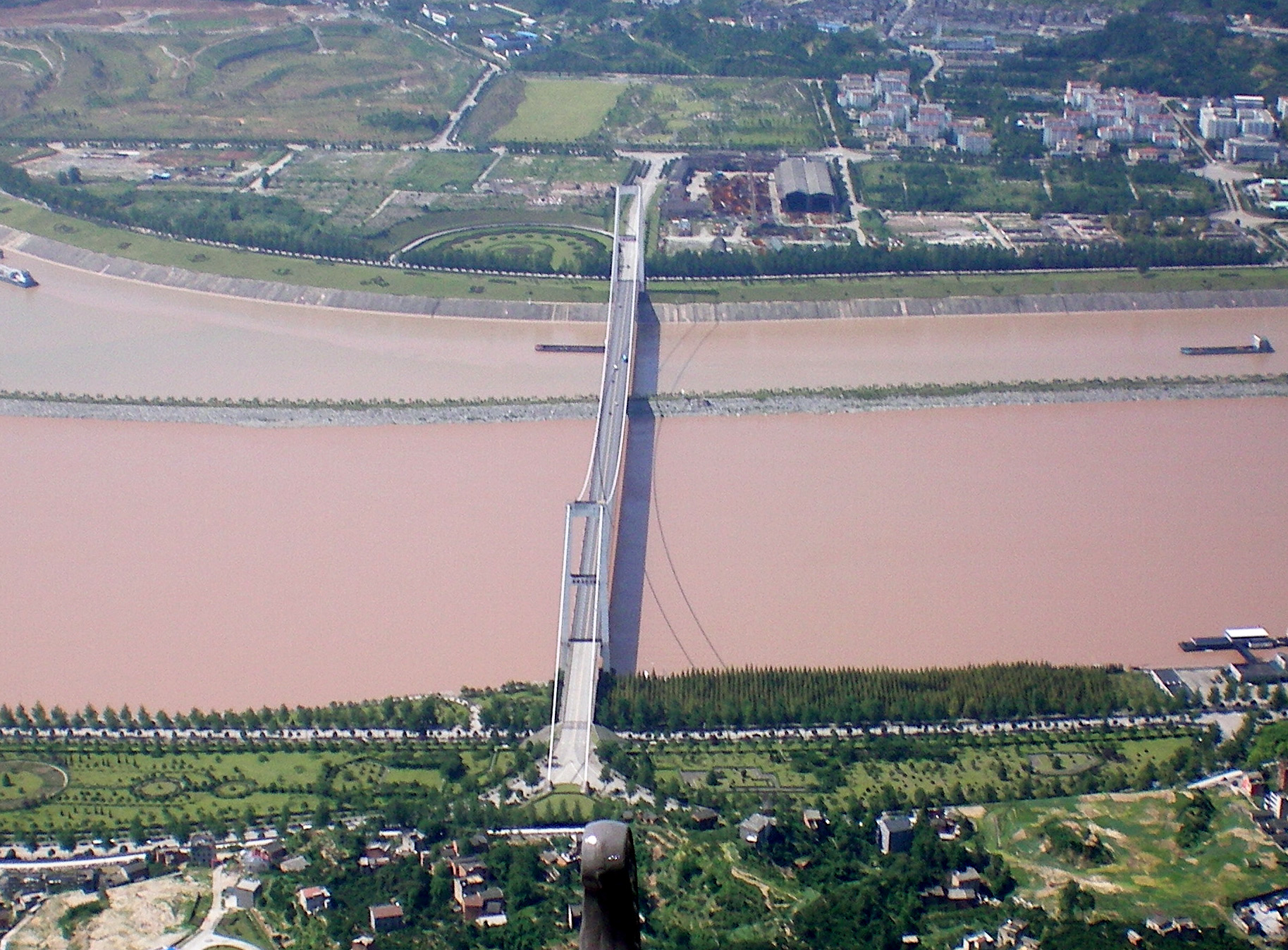
- Xiling Bridge and a section of Taipingxi Town. Looking north; the Yangtze flows to the right; Sandouping in the foreground, Taipingxi in the background

- Location in Hubei
- Coordinates: 30°51′0″N 111°0′0″E
- Country: People's Republic of China
- Province: Hubei
- Prefecture-level city: Yichang
- District: Yiling District
- Village-level divisions: 1 residential community 12 villages

Population (2010)
  - Total: 23,979
- Time zone: UTC+8 (China Standard)

Taipingxi Town (Chinese: 太平溪镇; pinyin: Tàipíngxī Zhèn, "Taiping Stream Town") is a town in Yiling District of Yichang Prefecture-level city of China's Hubei Province. It is located on the left (northern) side of the Yangtze River, near the northern end of the Three Gorges Dam.

As an administrative unit, Taipingxi occupies 152 square km (mostly, rural area), and has the population of 27,000 people.

Taipingxi town center is situated on the Three Gorges Reservoir, less than a kilometer north-west of the Three Gorges Dam's ship locks. An important river port, Taipingxi Harbor (Chinese: 太平溪港; 30°51′00″N 111°00′00″E) is adjacent to the town center. This is the easternmost port facility on the Three Gorges Reservoir, the one closest to the dam.

The towns of Maoping and Sandouping are located on the opposite (southern) side of the river; Letianxi, on the same (northern) side, a few kilometers downstream. The Xiling Bridge crosses the river downstream of the dam, connecting Taipingxi with Sandouping.

Like many other towns in the Three Gorges Reservoir Region, Taipingxi houses many residents resettled from villages flooded by the reservoir.

Besides the economic activities connected to the Three Gorges Dam and the Yangtze River shipping, Taipingxi also has mining and tea plantations.

== Administrative divisions ==
One residential community:

- Wuxiangmiao (伍相庙社区)

Twelve villages:

- Xujiachong (许家冲村), Luofo (落佛村), Longtanping (龙潭坪村), Fuchengping (富城坪村), Linjiaxi (林家溪村), Meirentuo (美人沱村), Xiaoxikou (小溪口村), Hanjiawan (韩家湾村), Taipingxi (太平溪村), Changling (长岭村), Huangjiachong (黄家冲村), Gucunping (古村坪村)

== See also ==
- List of township-level divisions of Hubei
