= Xiling Yangtze River Bridge =

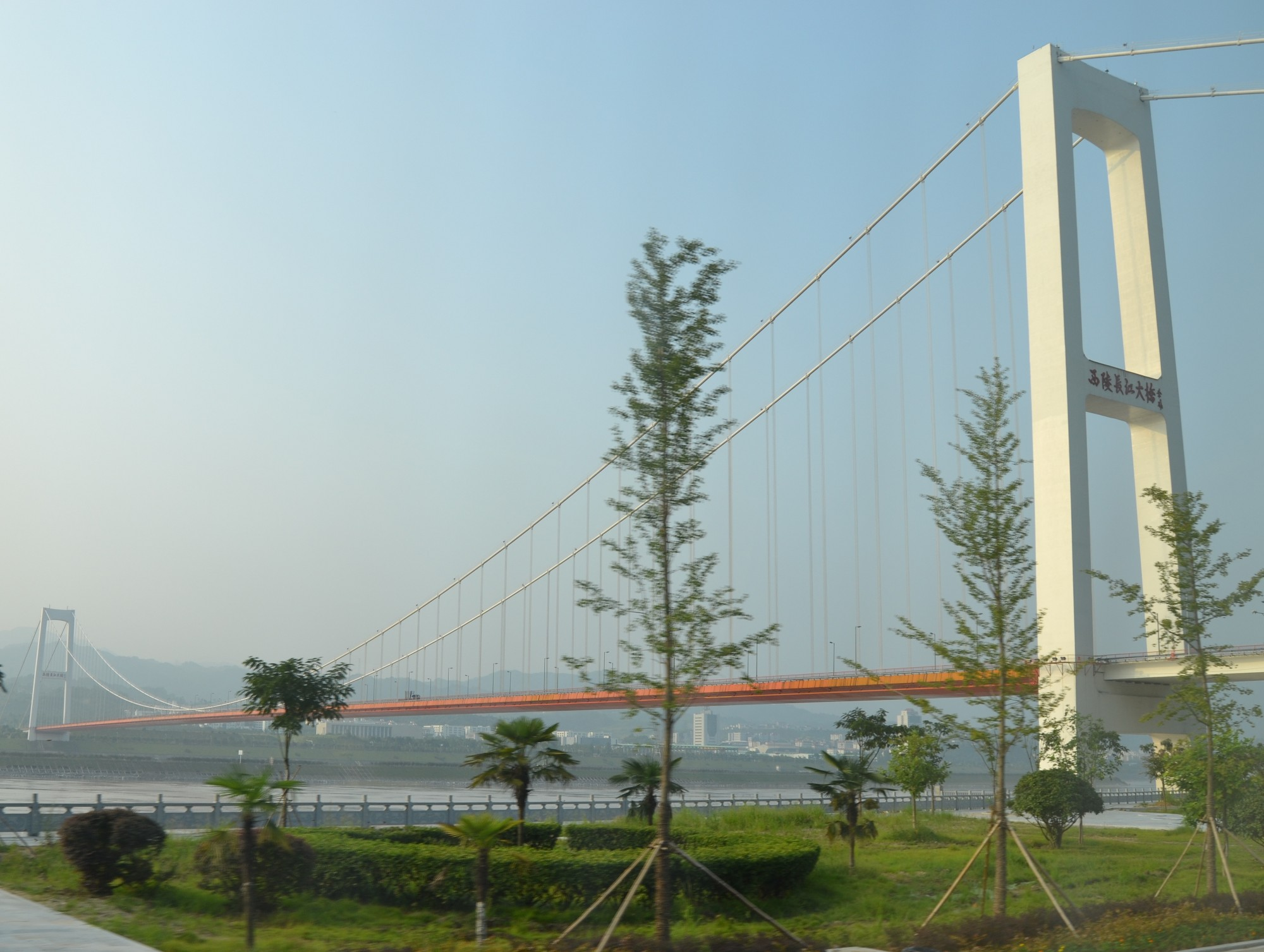
- Coordinates: 30.8285°N 111.0465°E
- Carries: motor traffic
- Crosses: Yangtze River
- Locale: Yichang, Hubei, China

Characteristics
- Design: gravity-anchored suspension bridge
- Width: 20.6 metres (68 ft)
- Longest span: 900 metres (3,000 ft)

History
- Designer: Bridge Reconnaissance and Design Institute
- Construction start: December 1993
- Construction end: 1996
- Opened: August 1996

The Xiling Yangtze River Bridge (simplified Chinese: 西陵长江大桥; traditional Chinese: 西陵長江大橋; pinyin: Xīlíng Chángjiāng Dàqiáo), is a suspension bridge over the Yangtze River, just a few kilometers downstream from the Three Gorges Dam. The bridge is located within Yiling District of the prefecture-level city of Yichang (Hubei Province of China), connecting the towns of Taipingxi and Letianxi (on the left, northern bank of the river) with Sandouping (on the right, southern bank).

The bridge is located some 50 km upstream (west) from Yichang main urban area (i.e., Xiling District). The construction started in December 1993 and was completed in 1996. The bridge opened in August 1996.) and had the longest bridge span across the Yangtze, of 900 meters. The total length of the bridge was reported as 1118.66 meters. The bridge surface is 18 m wide, carrying two lanes of traffic in each direction.

== See also ==
- Yiling Bridge (near Yichang's center city)
- List of longest suspension bridge spans
- List of largest bridges in China
- Yangtze River bridges and tunnels
