= Sandouping =

Town in Hubei, China

Sandouping 三斗坪镇 San-tou-p’ing
- Town
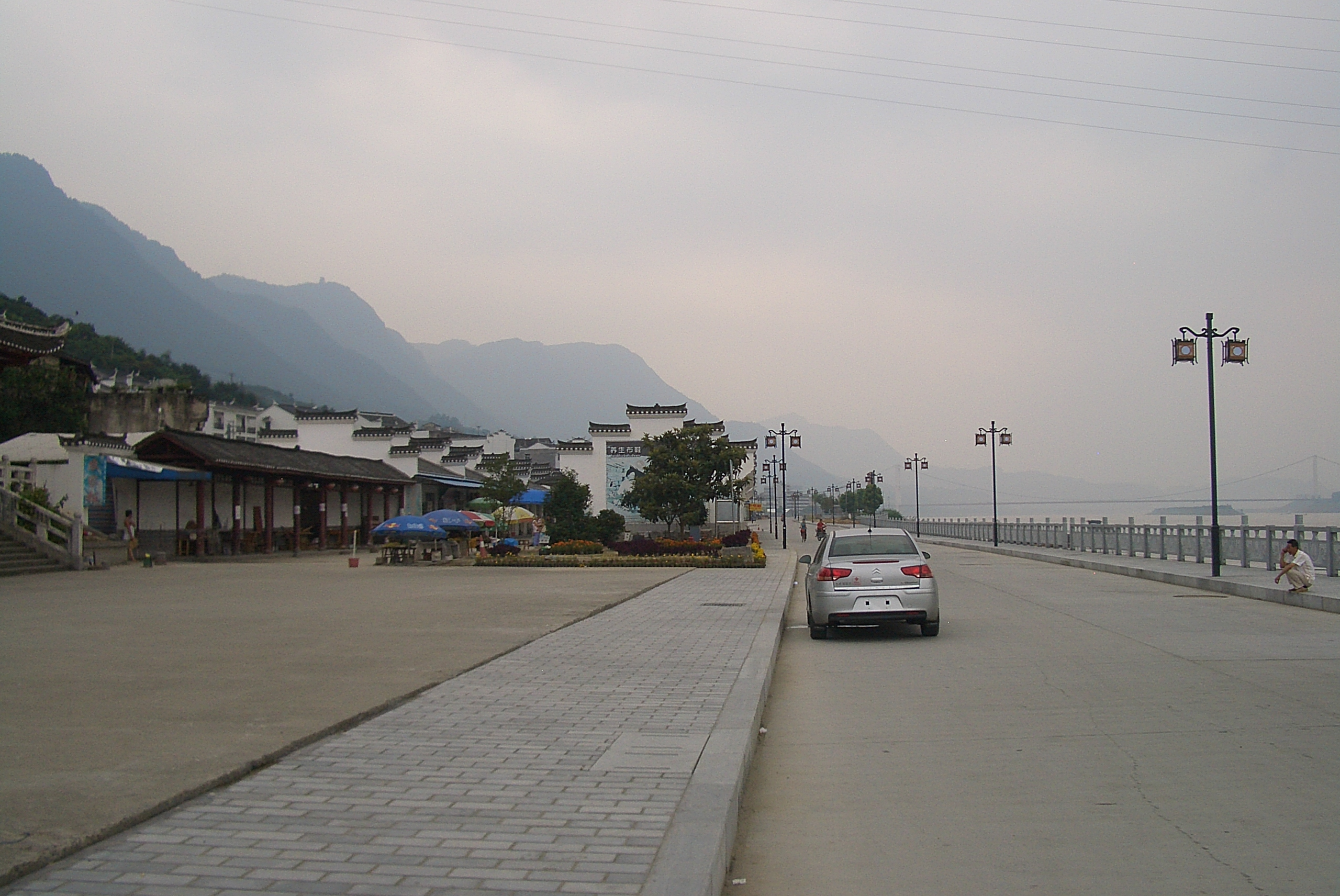
- On the Yangtze waterfront near Sandouping town center (Huanglingmiao Village), looking west toward Xiling Bridge and the Three Gorges Dam (not visible because of fog)

- Location in Hubei
- Coordinates: 30°48′42″N 111°00′56″E
- Country: People's Republic of China
- Province: Hubei
- Prefecture-level city: Yichang
- District: Yiling District
- Village-level divisions: 1 residential community 19 villages

Area
  - Total: 178 km^{2} (69 sq mi)
- Elevation (average): 480 m (1,570 ft)
- Highest elevation: 1,197 m (3,927 ft)
- Lowest elevation: 66 m (217 ft)

Population (2010)
  - Total: 29,494
  - Density: 166/km^{2} (429/sq mi)
- Time zone: UTC+8 (China Standard)
- Website: http://sdp.10.gov.cn/

Sandouping
- Chinese: 三斗坪
- Postal: Santouping
Transcriptions
Standard Mandarin
- Hanyu Pinyin: Sāndòupíng
- Wade–Giles: San-tou-p'ing

Sandouping (Chinese: 三斗坪; pinyin: Sāndǒupíng) is a town in Yiling District of Yichang prefecture-level city in the Chinese province of Hubei. It is located on the right (southern) bank of the Yangtze River, next to Yiling District's border with Zigui County to the west. Sandouping is best known as the location of the Three Gorges Dam, which is the world's largest electricity-generating plant of any kind.

== History ==
The predecessor of today's Sandouping, the village of Huangniupu (黄牛铺, "Yellow Cow Post Station") was established during the reign of the Hongzhi Emperor in 1496. Sandouping District was created in March 1949 and transformed into Sandouping Town in February 1984.

Sandouping used to be a small fishing village until it was selected to be the site of the Three Gorges Dam. In 1999, at the peak of the construction, over 40,000 workers lived in Sandouping. At the time, special permits were required to enter the town.

Six out of nineteen Sandouping's villages are populated by families that have been resettled from the areas flooded by the waters of the Three Gorges Reservoir, or, earlier, the Gezhouba Reservoir.

== Geography ==
The Town of Sandouping occupies 178 km^{2} on the right (southern) bank of the Yangtze River, opposite the town of Letianxi (乐天溪镇), to which it is connected by Xiling Bridge. Sandouping is the only town in Yiling District that is located south of the river.

Sandouping's western neighbor is the town of Maoping, the county seat of the nearby Zigui County. Although it is only a kilometer or two west of the dam (straight-line distance), it is actually several kilometers drive on Hubei Provincial Route 134, because of the terrain.

Administratively, the Town of Sandouping is divided into 19 villages (村) and 1 neighborhood committee (居民委员会). Sandouping's central urban area, where the town government and most services are located, is technically known as Yuanyi Village (园艺村). It is situated some 5 km east of the southern end of the Three Gorges Dam. The neighborhood just to the east, known as Huanglingmiao Village (黄陵庙村), is named after Huangling Temple (黄陵庙) located there near the Yangtze River waterfront. It is being developed as a tourism area, centered around the riverboat dock.

A secondary center of economic activity in the town is located in its western part, within walking distance from the service entrance to the Three Gorges Dam (Gaojiachong Village (高家冲) and Sandouping residential community).

== Administrative Divisions ==
One residential community:

- Sandouping (三斗坪社区)

Nineteen villages:

- Huanglingmiao (黄陵庙村), Huangniuyan (黄牛岩村), Nantuo (南沱村), Yuanyi (园艺村), Qipanshan (棋盘山村), Zhongbao/bu/pu (中堡村), Gaojiachong (高家冲村), Shiban (石板村), Qiuqianping (秋千坪村), Huajipo (花鸡坡村), Dongyuemiao (东岳庙村), Xinsheng (新生村), Shipai (石牌村), Tianqiao (天桥村), Zhemuping (柘木坪村), Wuhe (务河村), Toudingshi (头顶石村), Muyang (暮阳村), Baiguotang (柏果埫村)

== Economy ==
The town's economy is closely connected to the Yangtze River. Besides the Three Gorges Dam, major local enterprises include Hailun Shipyard (海轮造船厂) and Fazhong Vessel Servicing Company (发中船务有限公司).

The three main agricultural products of Sandouping are citrus fruits (according to different governmental sources, 15,000 mu [1,000 hectares] or 10535 mu [702 ha] under cultivation, with an annual harvest of 14,000 metric tons), silkworms (14400 mu/ 960 ha of mulberry plantations), and tea (3316 mu/ 221 ha).

The town's authorities are working on expanding tourism in the area.

== Gallery ==
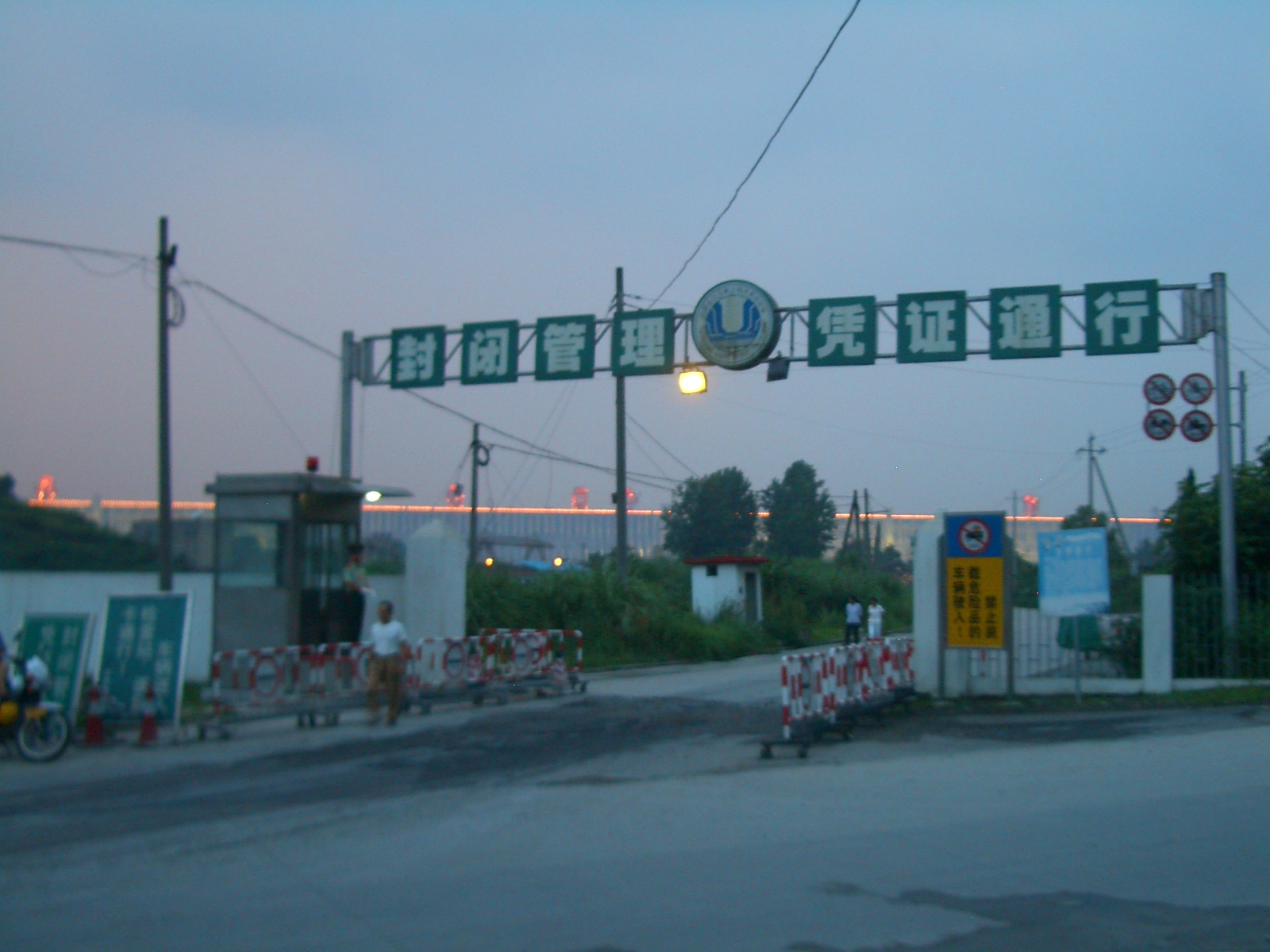
Dam facility's service entry, near Sandouping's western neighborhood. Part of the dam can be seen in the background

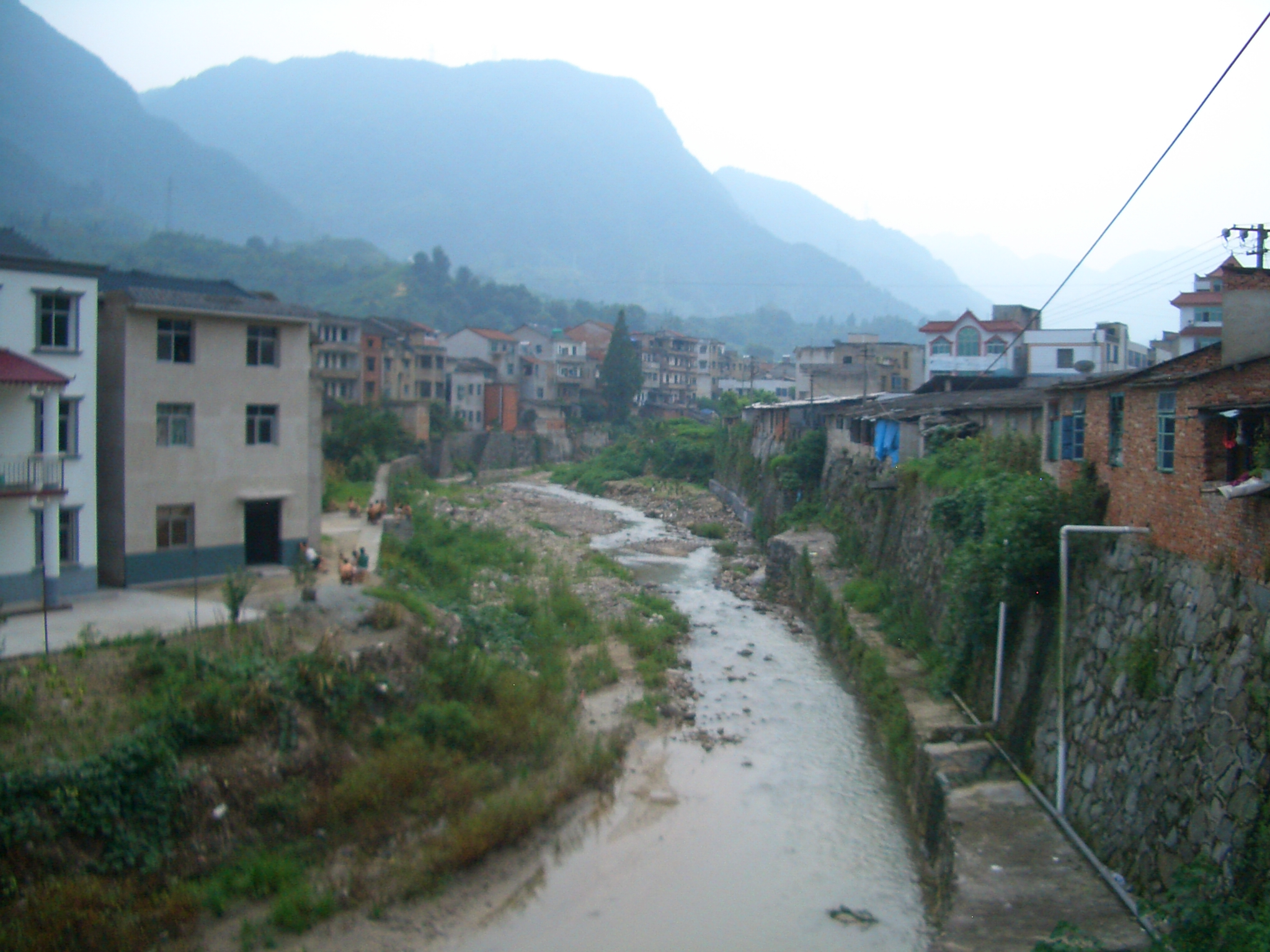
Workers' neighborhood in Sandouping near the southern entrance to the Three Gorges Dam

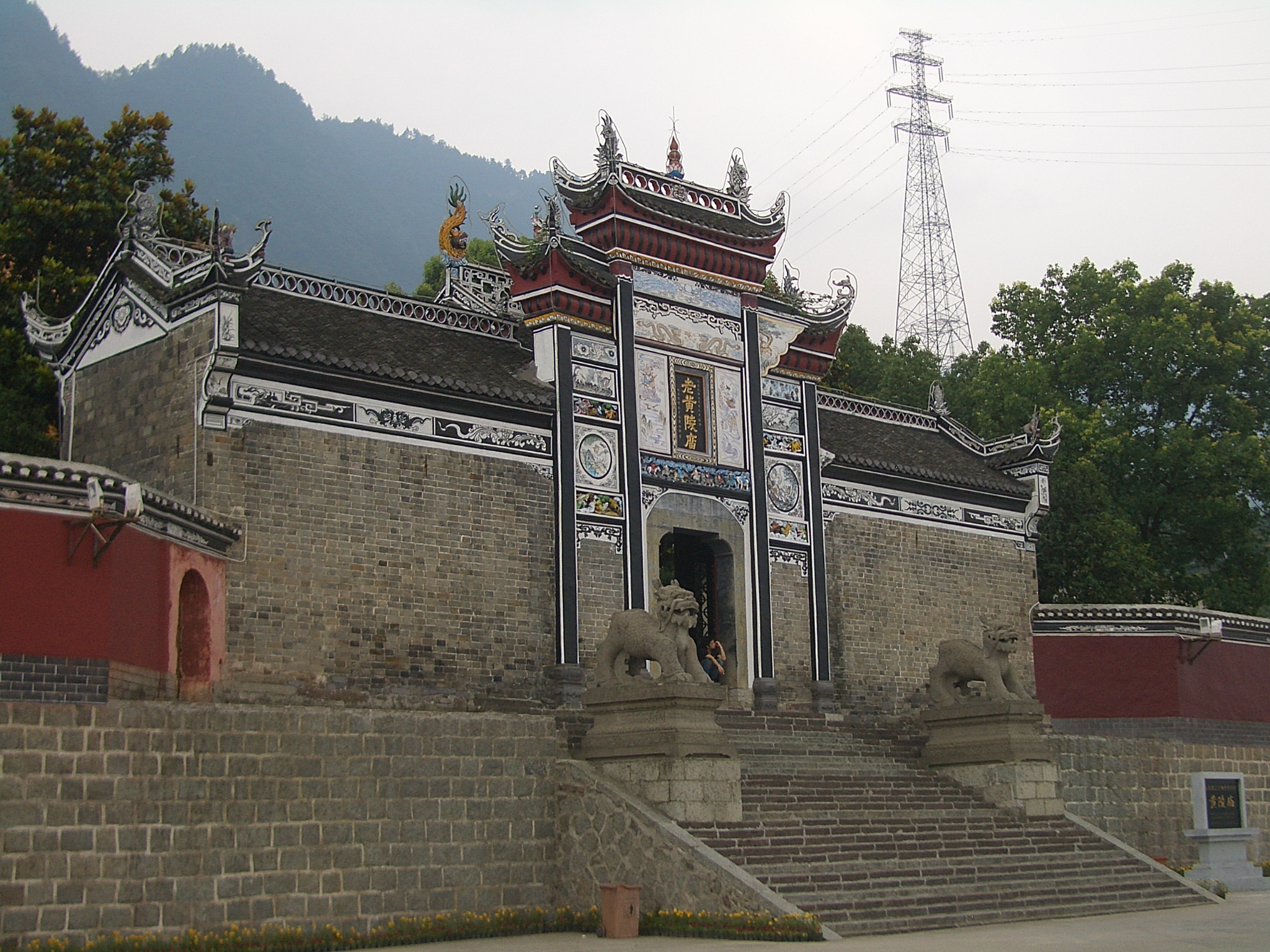
Huangling Temple

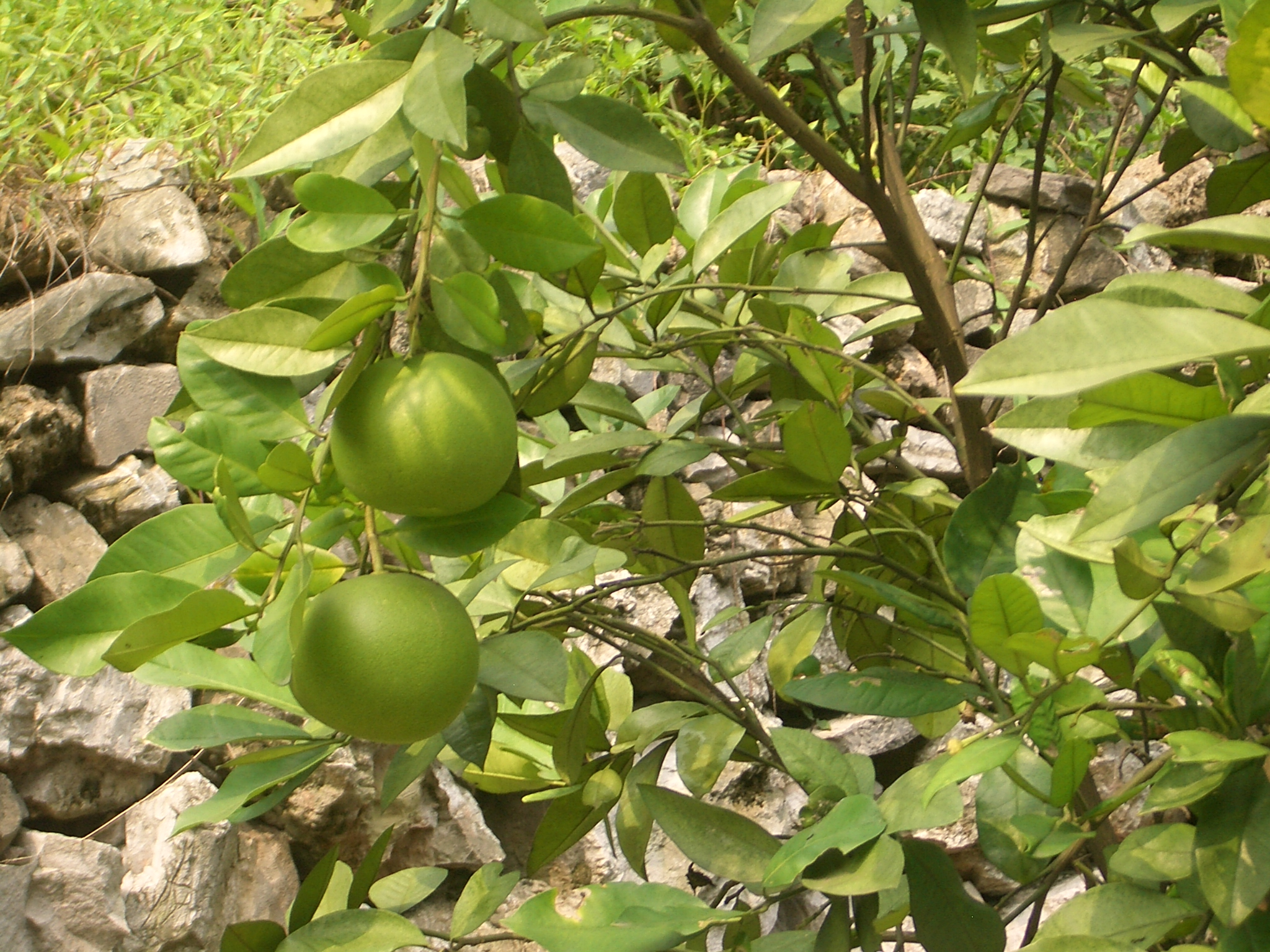
Pomelos or grapefruits in the neighboring town of Letianxi

== See also ==
- List of township-level divisions of Hubei
