= HVDC Three Gorges – Guangdong =

HVDC transmission line in China

Three Gorges – Guangdong HVDC Transmission

Location
- Country: China
- Coordinates: 30°27′26″N 112°08′18″E – 23°16′15″N 114°12′5″E
- General direction: South-southeast
- From: Jingzhou, Three Gorges Dam
- To: Huizhou, Guangdong

Construction information
- Substation manufacturer: ABB
- Commissioned: May 27, 2004

Technical information
- Type: overhead transmission line
- Current type: HVDC
- Total length: 940 km (580 mi)
- Capacity: 3000 MW
- DC voltage: ±500 kV
- No. of poles: 2

The HVDC Three Gorges – Guangdong is a 940-kilometre-long bipolar HVDC transmission line in China for the transmission of electric power from the Three Gorges power plant to the area of Guangdong. The powerline went into service in 2004. It runs from the static inverter station Jingzhou near the Three Gorges power plant to the static inverter plant Huizhou near Guangdong. The HVDC Three Gorges-Guangdong is a bipolar 500 kV powerline with a maximum transmission power rating of 3,000 megawatts.

== Sites ==
Site	Coordinates
Jingzhou Static Inverter Plant	30°27′26″N 112°08′18″E
Weiliujiatei Electrode	30°32′19″N 111°58′30″E
Huizhou Static Inverter Plant	23°16′15″N 114°12′5″E
Xiatang Electrode	23°23′20″N 114°34′48″E
