= Liang Weiyan =

Chinese electrical engineer

- Born: 2 October 1929; Beiping , Republic of China
- Died: 29 December 2018 (aged 89); Sanya, Hainan Province

Liang Weiyan (Chinese: 梁维燕; 2 October 1929 – 29 December 2018) was a Chinese electrical engineer and expert in power-generating equipment. He was one of the key engineers who designed the water turbines of the Three Gorges Dam, the world's largest power station. He also served as Chief Engineer of Harbin Electric Machinery Company and taught at the Harbin Institute of Technology. He was elected an academician of the Chinese Academy of Engineering in 1995.

== Biography ==
Liang was born 2 October 1929 in Beiping (now Beijing), Republic of China. His ancestral home was Xiangling County, Shanxi province.

After graduating from the electrical engineering department of Peiyang University (now Tianjin University) in 1951, he started his career at Harbin Electric Machinery Factory, eventually becoming Chief Engineer of the company.

In the 1970s, his design of a 125-megawatt water turbine generator for the Gezhouba Dam won a national gold prize, and he oversaw the manufacture of China's first 600-megawatt steam turbine generator using imported technology.

In the 1980s and 1990s, he was a leading member of the group of engineers which designed the water turbines of the Three Gorges Dam, the world's largest power plant. He was elected an academician of the Chinese Academy of Engineering (CAE) in 1995, and was appointed in 2008 as head of the power equipment group of the CAE's Three Gorges quality inspection team.

Liang was the chief editor of several books including History of China's Electric Industry (Hydropower Equipment Manufacturing) (中国电器工业发展史 (水力发电设备制造业)), and An English-Chinese Dictionary of Power Generation Engineering (英汉电站工程辞典). He also served as a Ph.D. advisor at the Harbin Institute of Technology.

Liang retired in May 2015. He died on 29 December 2018 in Sanya, Hainan Province, at the age of 89.
