= Yiling, Yichang =

Yiling 夷陵区
- District
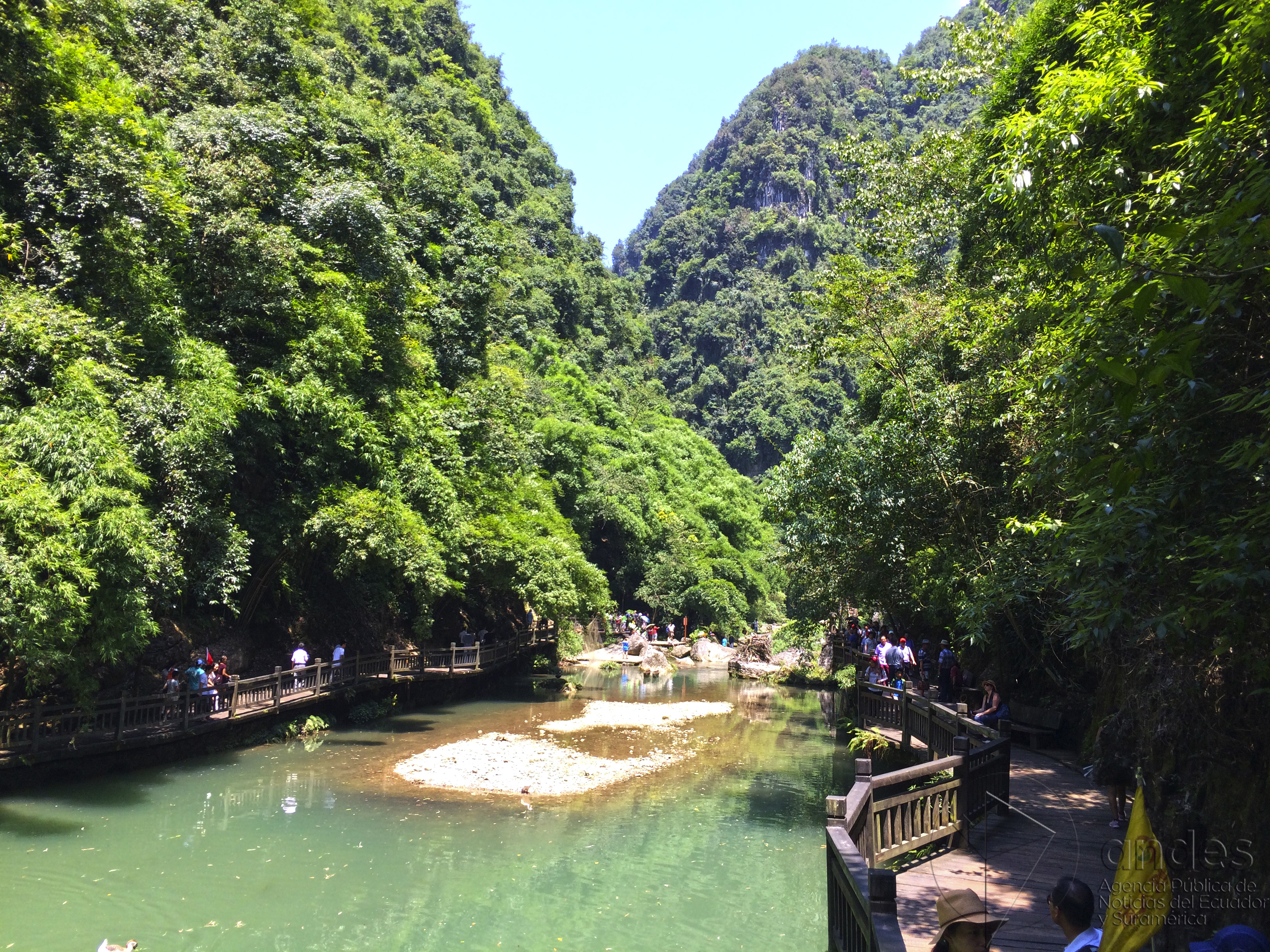
- Tribe Of The Three Gorges

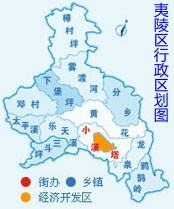
- Map of Yiling's township-level divisions

- Location in Hubei
- Coordinates (Yiling government): 30°46′12″N 111°19′34″E
- Country: People's Republic of China
- Province: Hubei
- Prefecture-level city: Yichang
- Carved out of the former Yichang County: 2001

Area
  - Total: 3,424 km^{2} (1,322 sq mi)

Population (2020)
  - Total: 534,408
  - Density: 156.1/km^{2} (404.2/sq mi)
- Time zone: UTC+8 (China Standard)
- Website: www.10.gov.cn

Yiling District (simplified Chinese: 夷陵区; traditional Chinese: 夷陵區; pinyin: Yílíng Qū) is a district of the prefecture-level city of Yichang, Hubei province, People's Republic of China. Created on July 30, 2001, the district includes most of the former Yichang County, with the exception of Yichang center city (which forms Xiling District) and certain southern and western suburbs.

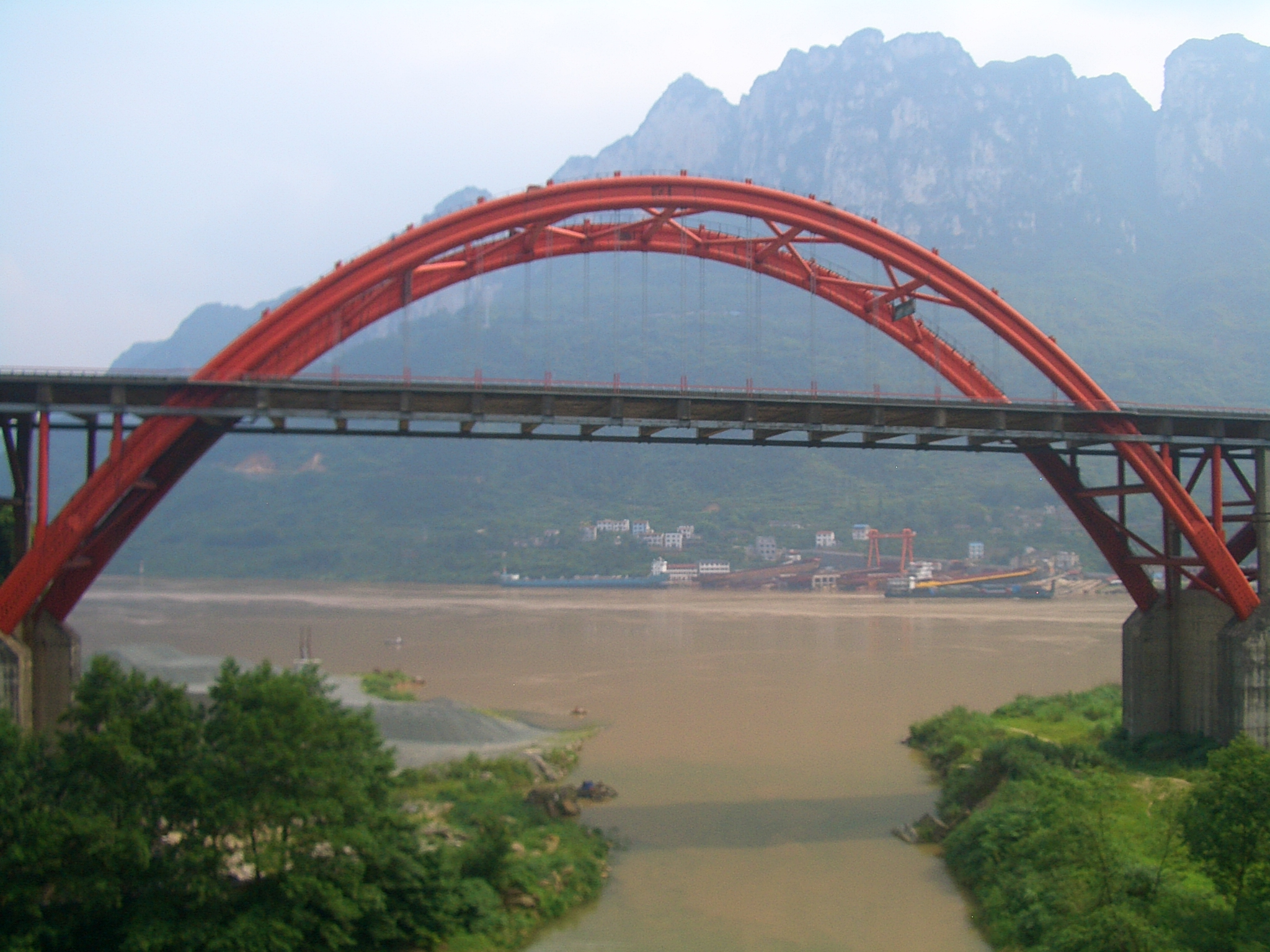
A shipyard on the southern side of the Yangtze (in Sandouping Town) seen from Liantuo Village (in Letianxi Town)

The land area of Yiling District is 3424 square km, population 534,408 (as of 2020).

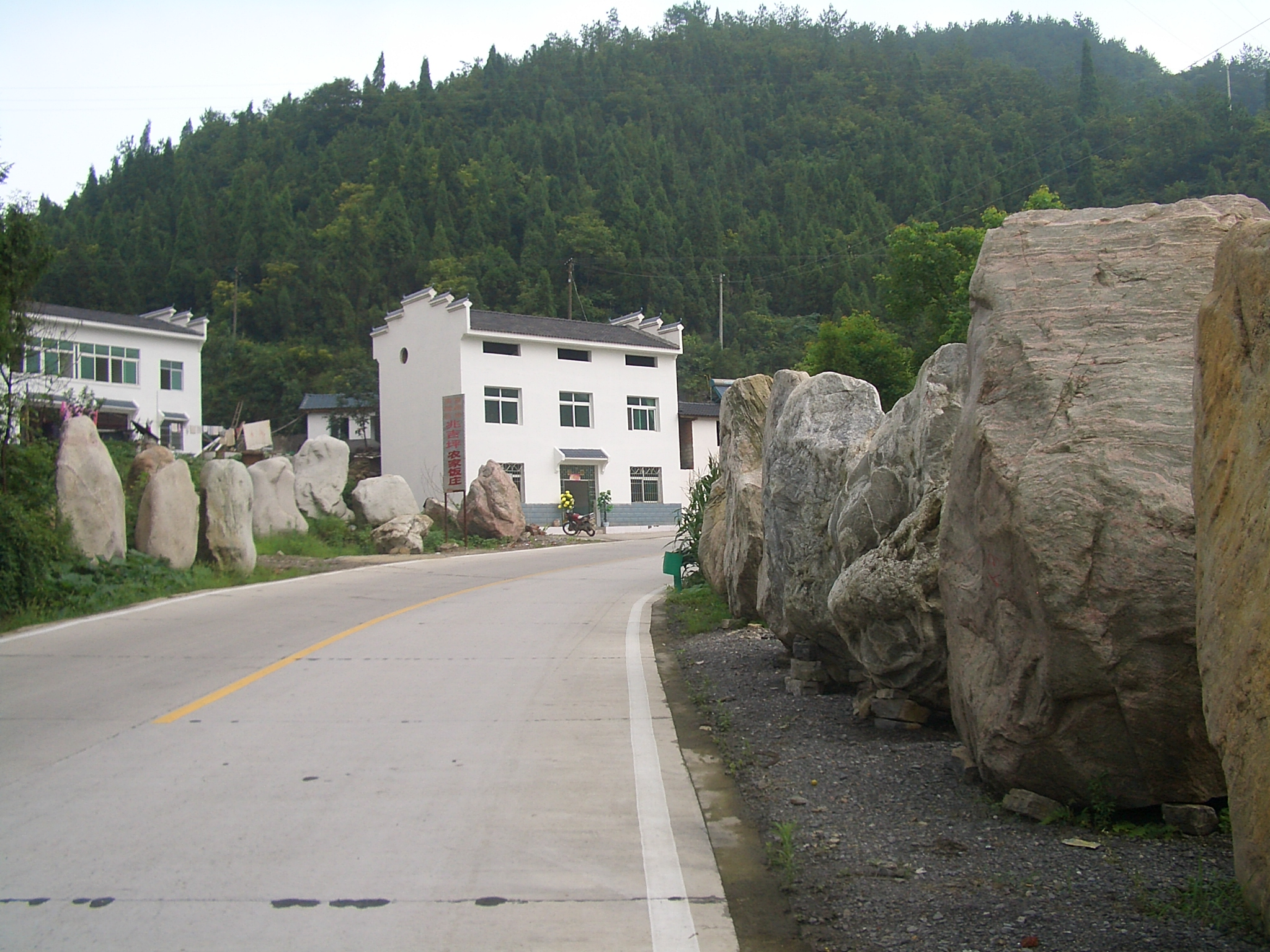
A quarry village

The district's seat of government is on the northern outskirts of Yichang urban area.

Both Gezhouba Dam and the Three Gorges Dam are located within the district. The Three Gorges Dam, located in Sandouping Town in Yiling District, is the world's largest hydropower station. The Xiling Bridge spans the Changjiang (Yangtze River) in the western part of Yiling District, connecting the towns of Letianxi and Sandouping on the northern and southern sides of the river. To add to the confusion, Yiling Bridge is not within Yiling District—rather, it connects the center-city Xiling District with Dianjun District south of the river.

== Administrative divisions ==
The district is divided into 9 towns, 2 townships, and 2 subdistricts:

Subdistricts:

- Xiaoxita Subdistrict (小溪塔街道), Yiling Economic Development Zone Subdistrict (夷陵经济开发区街道)

Towns:

- Zhangcunping (樟村坪镇), Wuduhe (雾渡河镇), Fenxiang (分乡镇), Taipingxi (太平溪镇), Sandouping (三斗坪镇), Letianxi (乐天溪镇), Longquan (龙泉镇), Yaqueling (鸦鹊岭镇), Huanghua (黄花镇) (formerly Huanghua Township (黄花乡))

Townships:

- Xiabaoping Township (下堡坪乡), Dengcun Township (邓村乡)

== Climate ==
Climate data for Yiling District, elevation 115 m (377 ft), (1991–2020 normals)
Month	Jan	Feb	Mar	Apr	May	Jun	Jul	Aug	Sep	Oct	Nov	Dec	Year
Mean daily maximum °C (°F)	9.0 (48.2)	11.8 (53.2)	17.9 (64.2)	23.8 (74.8)	27.8 (82.0)	30.7 (87.3)	33.1 (91.6)	33.0 (91.4)	28.3 (82.9)	23.2 (73.8)	17.3 (63.1)	11.4 (52.5)	22.3 (72.1)
Daily mean °C (°F)	4.7 (40.5)	7.1 (44.8)	12.3 (54.1)	17.9 (64.2)	22.3 (72.1)	25.9 (78.6)	28.1 (82.6)	27.8 (82.0)	23.6 (74.5)	18.3 (64.9)	12.6 (54.7)	6.9 (44.4)	17.3 (63.1)
Mean daily minimum °C (°F)	1.8 (35.2)	3.9 (39.0)	8.3 (46.9)	13.4 (56.1)	18.1 (64.6)	22.1 (71.8)	24.5 (76.1)	24.2 (75.6)	20.3 (68.5)	15.1 (59.2)	9.5 (49.1)	3.9 (39.0)	13.8 (56.8)
Average precipitation mm (inches)	22.8 (0.90)	34.7 (1.37)	50.4 (1.98)	95.6 (3.76)	121.9 (4.80)	165.9 (6.53)	207.3 (8.16)	190.2 (7.49)	93.8 (3.69)	68.2 (2.69)	42.6 (1.68)	15.1 (0.59)	1,108.5 (43.64)
Average precipitation days (≥ 0.1 mm)	7.9	9.3	10.7	11.9	14.2	12.3	14.8	12.8	11.2	10.9	10.1	7.3	133.4
Average snowy days	3.6	2.6	0.3	0.1	0	0	0	0	0	0	0.1	1.1	7.8
Average relative humidity (%)	73	75	71	73	74	77	80	77	76	76	78	73	75
Mean monthly sunshine hours	79.0	83.5	135.3	148.8	150.7	142.0	177.5	190.4	125.4	122.2	105.1	96.2	1,556.1
Percentage possible sunshine	24	26	36	38	35	34	42	47	34	35	33	31	35
Source: China Meteorological Administration
