= Three Gorges Reservoir Region =

Region in Chongqing and Hubei, China

Three Gorges Reservoir
- Location within Hubei
- Location: Chongqing municipality, Hubei province
- Coordinates: 30°49′48″N 111°0′20″E
- Primary inflows: Yangtze River
- Primary outflows: Yangtze River
- Surface area: 1,084 km^{2} (419 sq mi)
- Website: www.ctgpc.com.cn/en/

Three Gorges Reservoir Region, including 25 county-level divisions of Chongqing municipality and Hubei province, is the region directly or indirectly involved in the submersion of the water storage of the reservoir region of the Three Gorges Dam.

== Geographical condition ==
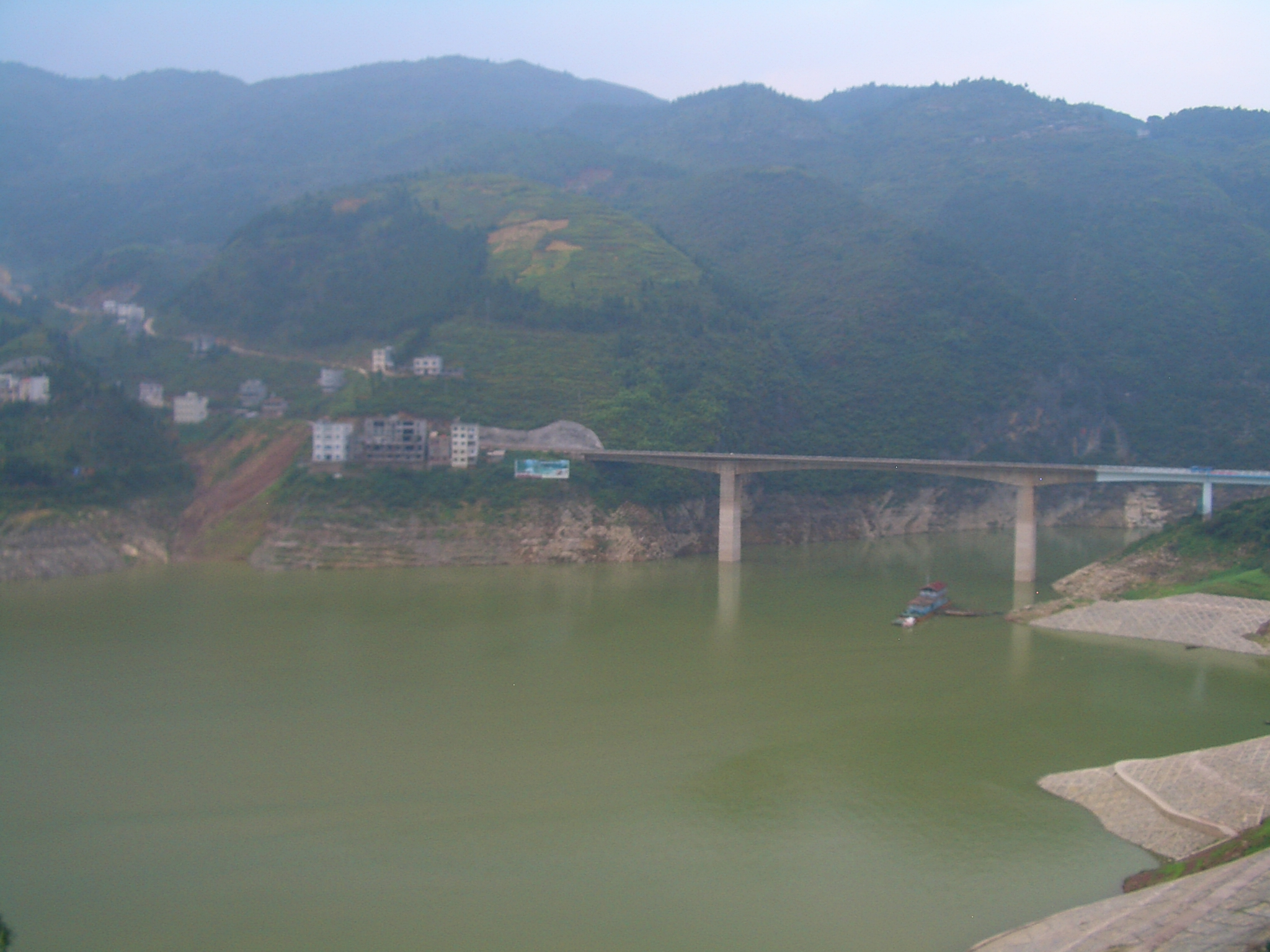
Formerly shallow Shen Nong Stream made into a major river, as it falls into the Yangtze near Badong

The Three Gorges Reservoir Region is located in the upstream of the Yangtze River at the boundary of Chongqing municipality and Hubei province with the area of 59900 km^{2} and with the population of 16 million. The Three Gorges Reservoir Region stretches impounding a lake 667 km long within the Yangtze River from Jiangjin District of Chongqing to Yichang City of Hubei, which is very narrow and where the geography is complex. The mountainous areas represent 74% of the region only with 4.3% plain area in the river valley and 21.7% hilly area. The climate of the reservoir region of the Three Gorges Project is the subtropical monsoon climate. Its location is in the transfer between the northern temperate zone and the subtropical zone, where it is hot, and it rains a lot with the annual rainfall of about 1100 mm. The valley of the Three Gorges Reservoir Region below 500 m has an annual temperature 17–19 °C and, with the frost-free period annually lasts 300–340 days. The annual runoff flow at the site of the dam of the Three Gorges Project is 451 billion m³ with the annual sediment discharge of 530 million tons.

== Natural and ecological resources ==
The Three Gorges abounds in water resources, ecological resources, tourism resources, and the resources of some ores, which have a great potential for exploration. The Yangtze River flows through the Three Gorges Reservoir Region with the good conditions for water transportation and the water-resources development. The potential installed capacity of hydropower can be about 30,000 MW in the Three Gorges Reservoir Region where the water resources are the most abundant for the whole mainstream of the Yangtze River. Since the conditions of the Three Gorges Reservoir Region for the development of the water resources are good with a short distance to the load center, there is great potential for development of the water resources. The agricultural resources of the Three Gorges Region are abundant, which are superior for the agriculture, forestry, livestock, sideline production and fishery. The Three Gorges Reservoir Region is proper for the growth of the various plants of both the warm temperate zone and the temperate zone. Dozens of ores have been explored and investigated in the Three Gorges Reservoir Region, such as gold, silver, copper, iron, uranium, sulfur, potassium, natural gas and halite.

The natural sights along the Yangtze River in the Three Gorges Reservoir Region are superb, particularly the along 162-km main river between Sandouping of Yichang and Baidicheng Town of Fengjie, which are the famous sights of the Three Gorges of the Yangtze River, one of the top tourist spots of interest in the world. In addition, there are a lot of cultural and historical sites, such as the Qu Yuan Temple of Zigui, the Zhaojun Home Village of Xingshan, the Shibao Stockade of Zhong County and the ghost town of Fengdu.

== Economy ==
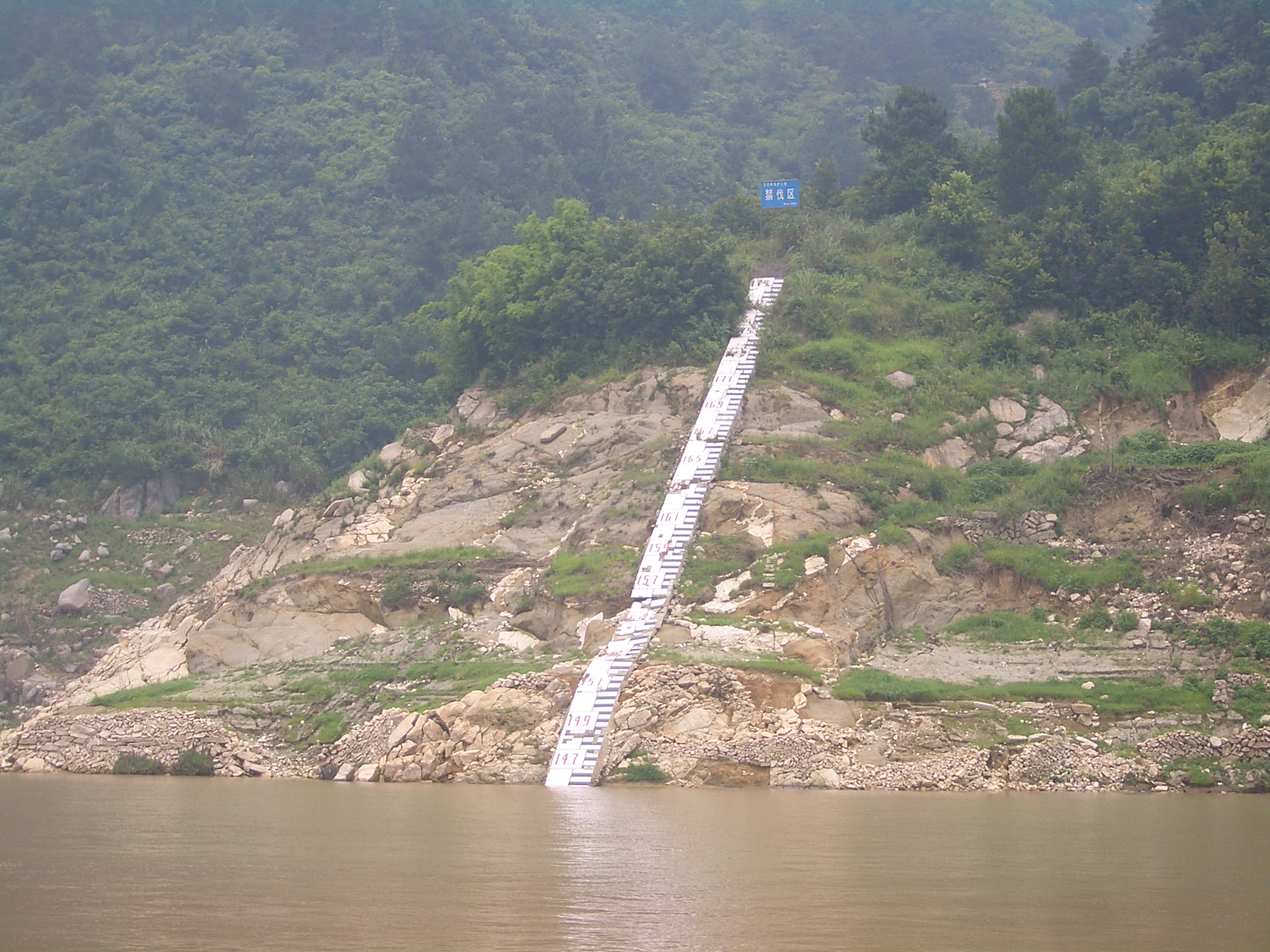
Water level in the reservoir (at the moment, 146 m above the sea level) measured by a shore marker. (Zigui County)

The Three Gorges Reservoir Region is an important part of the economic zone along the Yangtze River. The region is significant for both the promotion to the economic growth of the areas along the Yangtze River and the economic exchanges between the east of China and the west of China. The region is now and will be more and more superior for the economic progress of China with the gradual opening up to the world and the gradual economic promotion from the coastal areas to the river regions and the inland areas, especially with the construction of the Three Gorges Project. Furthermore, the Three Gorges Region is now and will be more and more significant for the economic development of China.

The Three Gorges Region has made its economic aims as follows.

- To gradually build up the largest hydropower base in China;
- To form an important industrial region midstream and upstream of the Yangtze River;
- To have its particular places of interest for tourism;
- To realize the preliminary economic prosperity;
- To build up the beautiful environments;
- To have a good resettlement of the local people;
- To make a new reservoir region with both the rapid economic progress and the good settlement of the immigrants.

During the second phase of reservoir water storage, 25 county-level divisions were involved in the submersion of the reservoir water storage. But from 1992 up to 2002, they had changed a lot as follows.

- Their total GDP had increased 4.1 times, that is, from 8.24 billion RMB yuan to 42.19 billion RMB yuan;
- Their annual growth rate is 17.7%;
- Their annual GDP per capita had increased from 906 RMB yuan to 4427 RMB yuan;
- The third industry had properly increased;
- The first industry had largely decreased;
- The second industry had largely increased;
- The percentages of the first, the second and the third industries had changed from 41%, 30% and 29% to 21%, 43% and 36%;
- The total industrial output on the basis of the pricing of 1990 had increased at the rate of 15.7% from 5.64 billion RMB yuan to 24.28 billion RMB yuan, and the total regional industrial output of 2002 was 3.3 times that of 1992;
- The regional revenue had increased at the rate of 16.2% from 790 million RMB yuan to 3.54 billion RMB yuan;
- The annual taxes of the local industrial enterprises had increased at the rate of 19.2% from 420 million RMB yuan to 2.43 billion RMB yuan, and the total annual regional taxes of the local industrial enterprises of 2002 was 4.8 times those of 1992;
- The profits of the local industrial enterprises had changed from -114,500 RMB yuan after the counteraction between the profits and the losses to 720 million RMB yuan after the counteraction between the profits and the losses.
