= Three Gorges Dam =

Dam in Yiling District, Hubei, China

Three Gorges Dam 三峡大坝
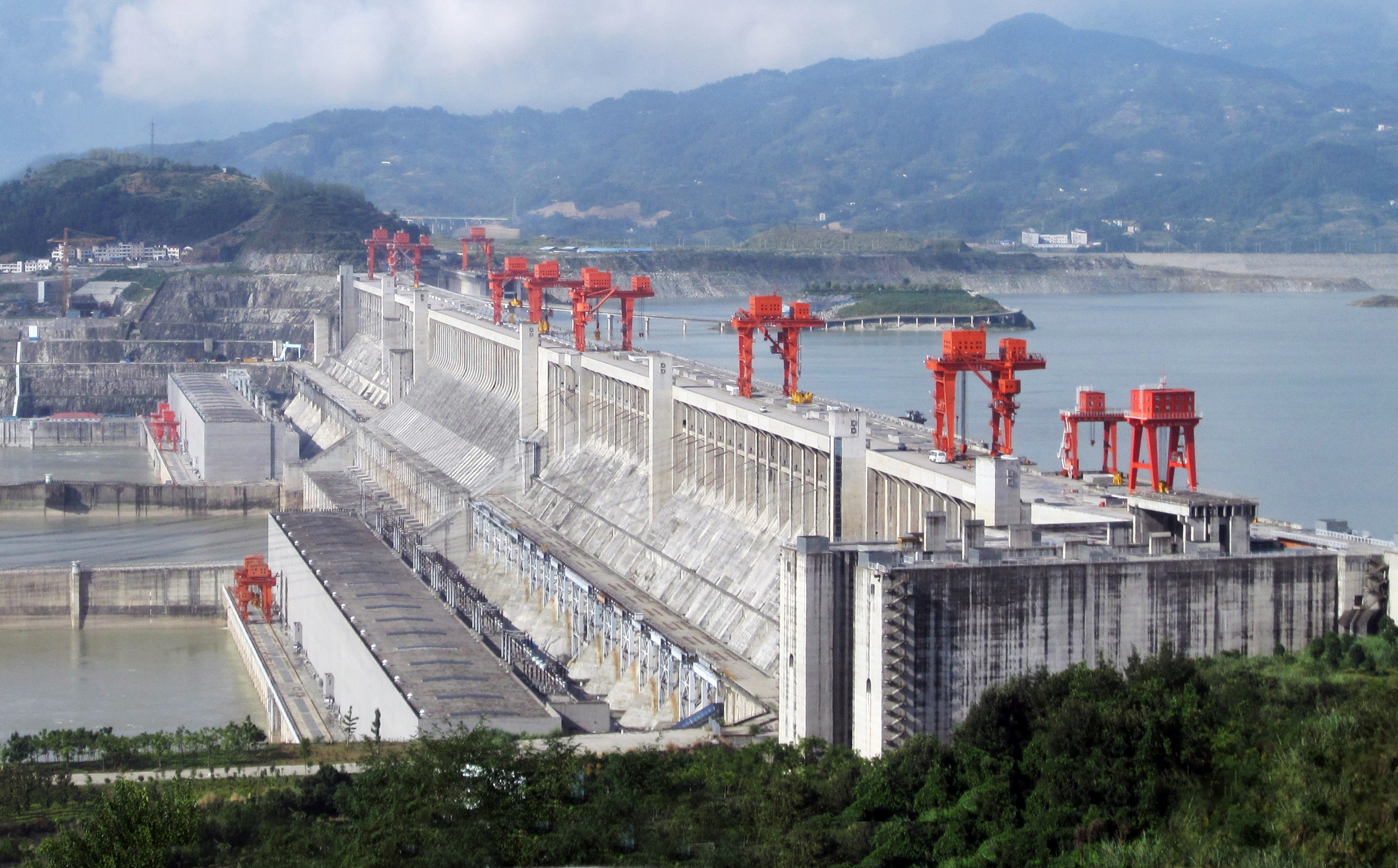
- The dam in September 2009

- Location in Hubei Province Three Gorges Dam 三峡大坝 (China)
- Interactive map of Three Gorges Dam 三峡大坝
- Country: China
- Location: Sandouping, Yiling District, Hubei
- Purpose: Flood control, power, navigation
- Status: Operational
- Construction began: December 14, 1994
- Opening date: 2003
- Construction cost: ¥203 billion (US$31.765 billion)
- Owner: China Yangtze Power (subsidiary of China Three Gorges Corporation)

Dam and spillways
- Type of dam: Gravity dam
- Impounds: Yangtze River
- Height: 181 m (594 ft)
- Length: 2,335 m (7,661 ft)
- Width (crest): 40 m (131 ft)
- Width (base): 115 m (377 ft)
- Dam volume: 27.2 million m^{3} (35.6 million yd^{3})
- Spillway capacity: 116,000 m^{3}/s (4,100,000 cu ft/s)

Reservoir
- Creates: Three Gorges Reservoir
- Total capacity: 39.3 km^{3} (31,900,000 acre⋅ft)
- Catchment area: 1,000,000 km^{2} (390,000 mi^{2})
- Surface area: 1,084 km^{2} (419 mi^{2})
- Maximum length: 600 km (370 mi)
- Normal elevation: 175 m (574 ft)

Power Station
- Commission date: 2003–2012
- Type: Conventional
- Hydraulic head: Rated: 80.6 m (264 ft); Maximum: 113 m (371 ft)
- Turbines: 32 × 700 MW; 2 × 50 MW Francis-type
- Installed capacity: 22,500 MW
- Capacity factor: 45%
- Annual generation: 101.6 TWh (366 PJ) (2018)

The Three Gorges Dam, (Note: simplified Chinese: 三峡大坝; traditional Chinese: 三峽大壩; pinyin: Sānxiá Dàbà) officially known as Yangtze River Three Gorges Water Conservancy Project (Note: simplified Chinese: 长江三峡水利枢纽工程; traditional Chinese: 長江三峽水利樞紐工程) is a hydroelectric gravity dam that spans the Yangtze River near Sandouping in Yiling District, Yichang, Hubei province, central China, downstream of the Three Gorges. It is also the world's largest power station by installed capacity (22,500 MW); it generates 95±20 TWh of electricity per year on average, depending on the amount of precipitation in the river basin. After the monsoons of 2020, the dam produced nearly 112 TWh in a year, breaking the record of 103 TWh set by the Itaipu Dam in 2016.

The dam's body, 185 meters high and 2,309 meters wide, was completed in 2006. The power plant became fully operational in 2012, when the last of the 32 main water turbines in the underground plant began production. The last major component of the project, the ship lift, was completed in 2015.

Each of the 32 turbines, considered state-of-the-art at the time of their installation, can generate 700 MW. Combined with two 50 MW generators that power the plant itself, the Three Gorges Dam can generate some 22,500 MW—far more than the next-biggest hydroelectric plant, the 16,000 MW Baihetan Dam, also in China.

The dam improves the Yangtze River's shipping capacity and provides flood control, helping to protect millions of people from severe flooding on the Yangtze Plain. Additionally, its hydroelectric power generation has helped fuel China's economic growth. As a result, the Chinese government considers the project a source of national pride and a major social and economic success. However, it is controversial domestically and abroad. Estimates of the number of people displaced by the dam's construction range from 1.13 million to around 1.4 million. Its construction has also inundated ancient and culturally significant sites. In operation, the dam has caused some ecological changes, including an increased risk of landslides.

Three Gorges Dam
- Simplified Chinese: 三峡大坝
- Traditional Chinese: 三峽大壩
- Literal meaning: Three Gorges Great Dam
Transcriptions
Standard Mandarin
- Hanyu Pinyin: Sānxiá Dàbà
- Bopomofo: ㄙㄢ ㄒㄧㄚˊ ㄉㄚˋ ㄅㄚˋ
- IPA: [sán.ɕjǎ tâ.pâ]
other Mandarin
- Dungan: сань ся да ба

== History ==
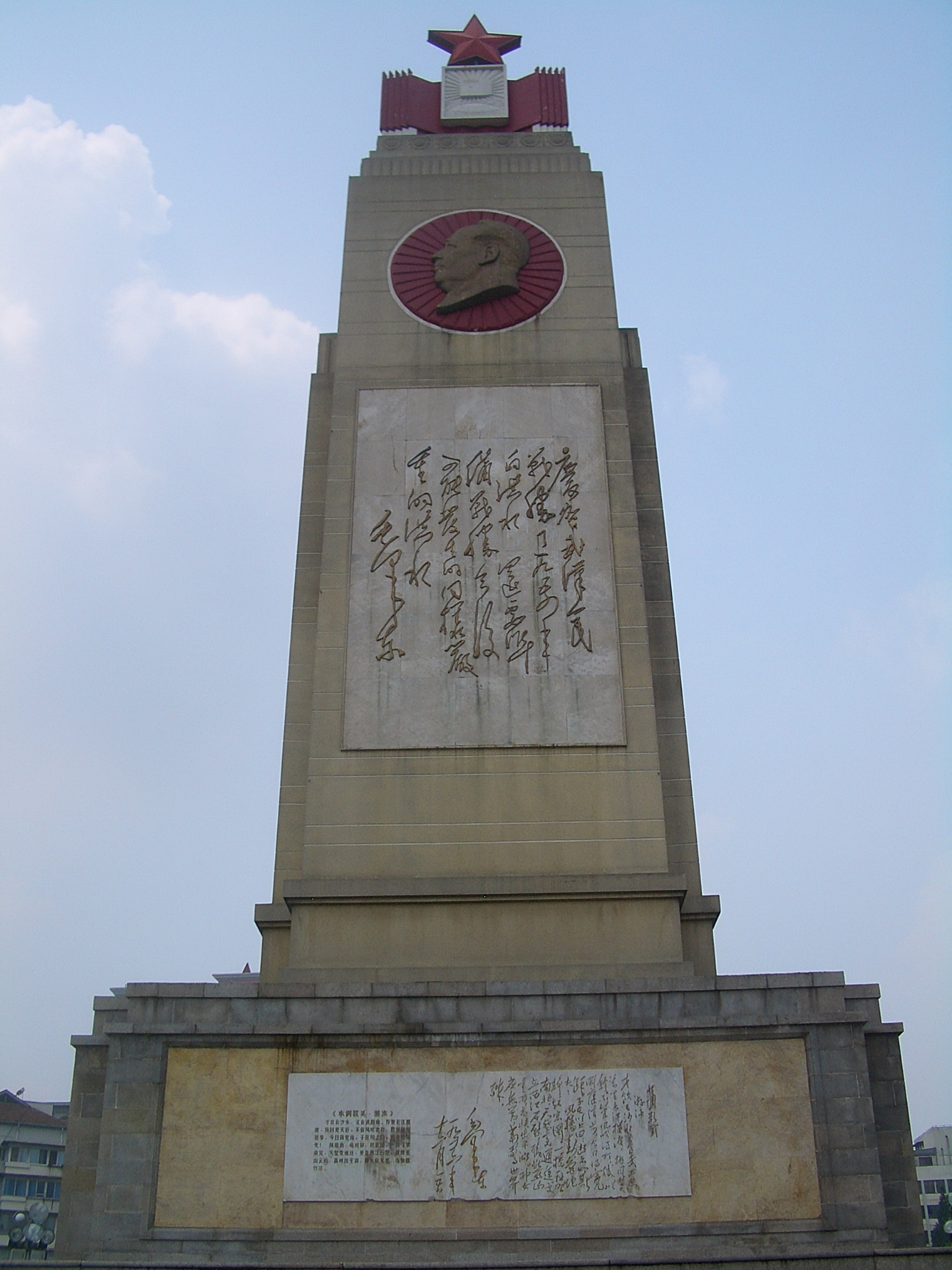
In his poem "Swimming" (1956), engraved on the 1954 Flood Memorial in Wuhan, Mao Zedong envisions "A Great Stone Wall, to catch the clouds and rains of Wushan as the fall" as "A Great lake shall rise upon the gorge!".

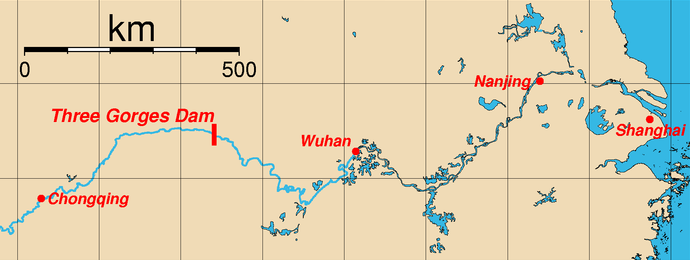
Map of the location of the Three Gorges Dam and the most important cities along the Yangtze River

Sun Yat-sen envisioned a large dam across the Yangtze River in The International Development of China (1919). He wrote that a dam capable of generating 30 million horsepower (22 GW) was possible downstream of the Three Gorges. In 1932, the Nationalist government, led by Chiang Kai-shek, began preliminary work on plans in the Three Gorges. In 1939, during the Second Sino-Japanese War, Japanese military forces occupied Yichang and surveyed the area.

In 1944, the United States Bureau of Reclamation's head design engineer, John L. Savage, surveyed the area and drew up a dam proposal for a "Yangtze River Project". Some 54 Chinese engineers went to the US for training. The original plans called for the dam to employ a unique method for moving ships: the ships would enter locks at the dam's lower and upper ends and then cranes would move them from each lock to the next. Groups of craft would be lifted together for efficiency. It is not known whether this solution was considered for its water-saving performance or because the engineers thought the difference in height between the river above and below the dam too great for alternative methods. No construction work was performed because of the Nationalists' worsening situation in the Chinese Civil War.

After the 1949 Communist Revolution, Mao Zedong supported the project, but began the Gezhouba Dam project nearby first, and economic problems including the Great Leap Forward and the Cultural Revolution slowed progress. After the 1954 Yangtze River Floods, in 1956, Mao wrote "Swimming", a poem about his fascination with a dam on the Yangtze River. In 1958, after the Hundred Flowers Campaign, some engineers who spoke out against the project were imprisoned.

During China's emphasis on the Four Modernizations during its early period of Reform and Opening Up, The Communist Party revived plans for the dam and proposed to start construction in 1986. It emphasized the need to develop hydroelectric power.

The Chinese People's Political Consultative Conference became a center of opposition to the proposed dam. It convened panels of experts who recommended delaying the project.

The National People's Congress approved the dam in 1992: of 2,633 delegates, 1,767 voted in favour, 177 voted against, 664 abstained, and 25 members did not vote, giving the legislation an unusually low 67.75% approval rate. Construction started on December 14, 1994. The dam was expected to be fully operational in 2009, but additional projects, such as the underground power plant with six additional generators, delayed full operation until 2012. The ship lift was completed in 2015. The dam raised the water level in the reservoir to 172.5 m (566 ft) above sea level by 2008 and to the designed maximum level of 175 m (574 ft) by 2010.

== Composition and dimensions ==
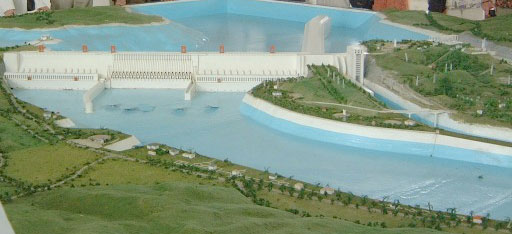
Model of the Three Gorges Dam looking upstream, showing the dam body (middle left), the spillway (middle of the dam body) and the ship lift (to the right).

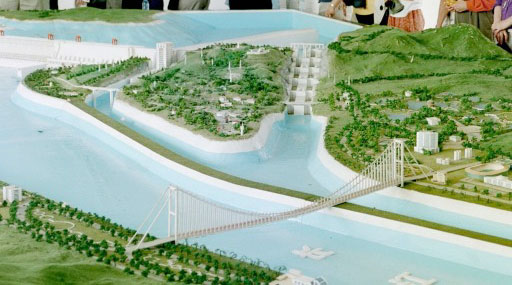
Model of the Three Gorges Dam showing the ship lift and the ship lock. The ship lift is to the right of the dam body with its own designated waterway. The ship locks are to the right (northeast) of the ship lift.

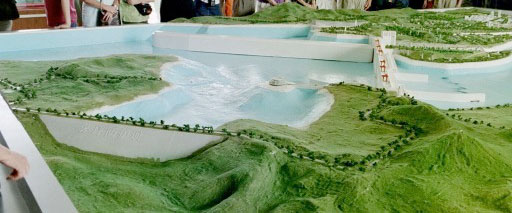
Earthfill south dam in foreground with view along main dam. The wall beyond is to separate spillway and turbine flows from the lock and ship lift upstream approach channel. A similar separation is used on the downstream side, seen partially in the preceding image.

Made of concrete and steel, the dam is 2,335 m (2,554 yd; 1.451 mi) long and 185 m (607 ft) above sea level at its top. The project used 27.2 million m^{3} (35.6 million yd^{3}) of concrete (mainly for the dam wall), used 463,000 tonnes of steel (enough to build 63 Eiffel Towers), and moved about 102.6 million m^{3} (134.2 million yd^{3}) of earth. The concrete dam wall is 181 m (594 ft) high above the rock basis.

When the water level is at its maximum of 175 m (574 ft) above sea level, 110 m (361 ft) higher than the river level downstream, the dam reservoir is on average about 660 km (410 mi) in length and 1.12 km (3,675 ft) in width. It contains 39.3 km^{3} (31,900,000 acre⋅ft) of water and has a total surface area of 1,045 km^{2} (403 sq mi). On completion, the reservoir flooded a total area of 632 km^{2} (156,000 acres) of land, compared to the 1,350 km^{2} (330,000 acres) of reservoir created by the Itaipu Dam.

== Economics ==
The Chinese government estimated that the Three Gorges Dam project would cost 180 billion yuan (US$22.5 billion). By the end of 2008, spending had reached 148.365 billion yuan, of which 64.613 billion yuan was spent on construction, 68.557 billion yuan on relocating affected residents, and 15.195 billion yuan on financing. It was estimated in 2009 that the cost of construction would be fully recouped when the dam had generated 1,000 terawatt-hours (3,600 PJ) of electricity, yielding 250 billion yuan; total cost recovery was thus expected to be completed ten years after the dam became fully operational. In fact, the entire cost of the Three Gorges Dam was recovered by December 20, 2013.

Funding sources include the Three Gorges Dam Construction Fund, profits from the Gezhouba Dam, loans from the China Development Bank, loans from domestic and foreign commercial banks, corporate bonds, and revenue from both before and after the dam had become fully operational. Additional charges were assessed as follows: every province receiving power from the Three Gorges Dam had to pay an extra ¥7.00 per MWh, and the other provinces had to pay an additional charge of ¥4.00 per MWh. No surcharge was imposed on the Tibet Autonomous Region.

== Power generation and distribution ==
=== Generating capacity ===
Electricity production in China by source. Compare: The fully completed Three Gorges dam contributes about 100 TWh of generation per year.

Three Gorges Dam compared to all other Chinese hydroelectricity production

Power generation is managed by China Yangtze Power, a listed subsidiary of China Three Gorges Corporation (CTGC), a Central Enterprise administered by SASAC. The Three Gorges Dam is the world's largest capacity hydroelectric power station, with 34 generators: 32 main generators, each with a capacity of 700 MW, and two plant power generators, each with capacity of 50 MW, for a total of 22,500 MW. Among the 32 main generators, 14 are installed on the dam's north side, 12 on the south side, and the remaining six in the underground power plant in the mountain south of the dam. Annual electricity generation in 2018 was 101.6 TWh, which is 20 times more than the Hoover Dam.

=== Generators ===
The main generators each weigh about 6,000 tonnes and are designed to produce more than 700 MW of power each. The designed hydraulic head of the generators is 80.6 metres (264 ft). The flow rate varies between 600–950 cubic metres per second (21,000–34,000 cu ft/s) depending on the head available; the greater the head, the less water needed to reach full power. Three Gorges uses Francis turbines with a diameter of 9.7/10.4 m (VGS design/Alstom's design) and a rotation speed of 75 revolutions per minute. This means that in order to generate power at 50 Hz, the generator rotors have 80 poles. Rated power is 778 MVA, with a maximum of 840 MVA and a power factor of 0.9. The generator produces electrical power at 20 kV. The electricity generated is then stepped up to 500 kV for transmission at 50 Hz. The generator's stator, the biggest of its kind, is 3.1/3 m in height; the outer diameter of the stator is 21.4/20.9 m, the inner diameter is 18.5/18.8 m, and the bearing load is 5,050/5,500 tonnes. Average efficiency is over 94%, with a maximum efficiency of 96.5% reached.

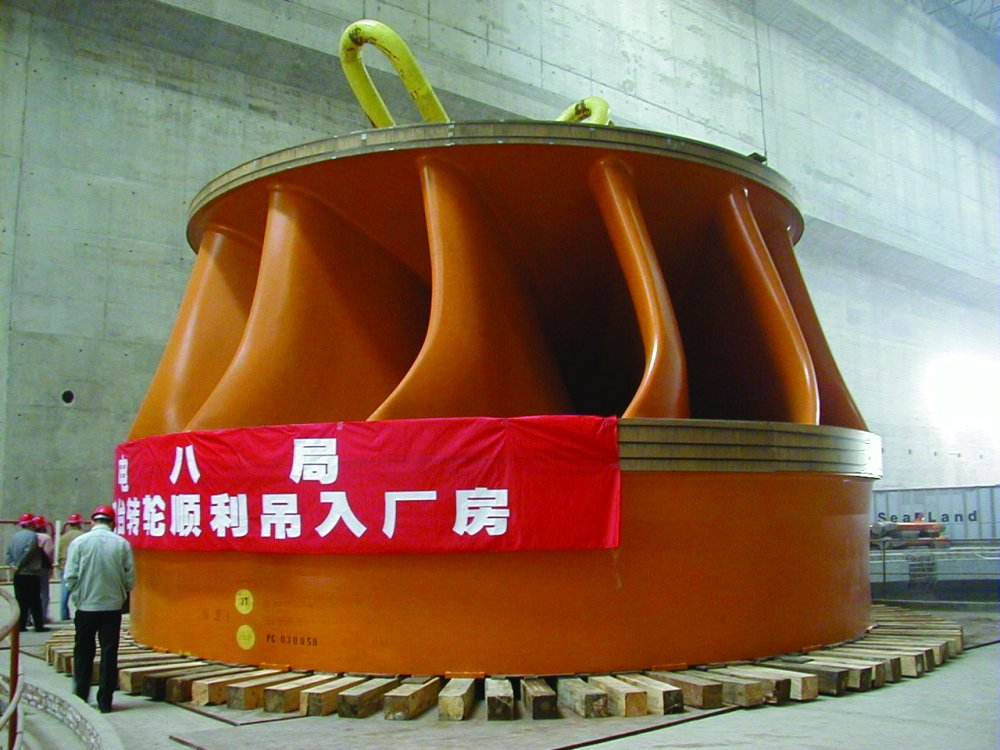
Francis turbine at Three Gorges Dam

The generators were manufactured by two joint ventures: Alstom, ABB, Kvaerner, and the Chinese company Harbin Motor; and Voith, General Electric, Siemens (abbreviated as VGS), and the Chinese company Oriental Motor. The technology transfer agreement was signed together with the contract. Most of the generators are water-cooled. Some of the newer ones are air-cooled, making them simpler in design and easier to manufacture and maintain.

=== Generator installation progress ===
The first north-side main generator (No. 2) started up on July 10, 2003. The north side became completely operational on September 7, 2005, with the implementation of generator No. 9. Full power (9,800 MW) was eventually achieved on October 18, 2006, after the water level reached 156 meters.

On the south side, main generator No. 22 started up on June 11, 2007, and No. 15 became operational on October 30, 2008. The sixth (No. 17) began operation on December 18, 2007, raising capacity to 14.1 GW, exceeding that of Itaipu dam (14.0 GW) to become the world's largest hydro power plant by capacity.

When the last main generator (No. 27) finished its final test on May 23, 2012, the six underground main generators were all operational, raising the capacity to 22.5 GW. After nine years of construction, installation and testing, the power plant was fully operational by July 2012.

=== Output milestones ===
Annual production of electricity
Year	Number of installed units	TWh	Reference
2003	6	8.607	
2004	11	39.155	
2005	14	49.090	
2006	14	49.250	
2007	21	61.600	
2008	26	80.812	
2009	26	79.470	
2010	26	84.370	
2011	29	78.290	
2012	32	98.100	
2013	32	83.270	
2014	32	98.800	
2015	32	87.000	
2016	32	93.500	
2017	32	97.600	
2018	32	101.600	
2019	32	96.880	
2020	32	111.800	
2021	32	103.649	
2022	32	78.790	
2023	32	80.271	
2024	32	82.911	
2025	32	95.715	

Three Gorges Dam annual power output

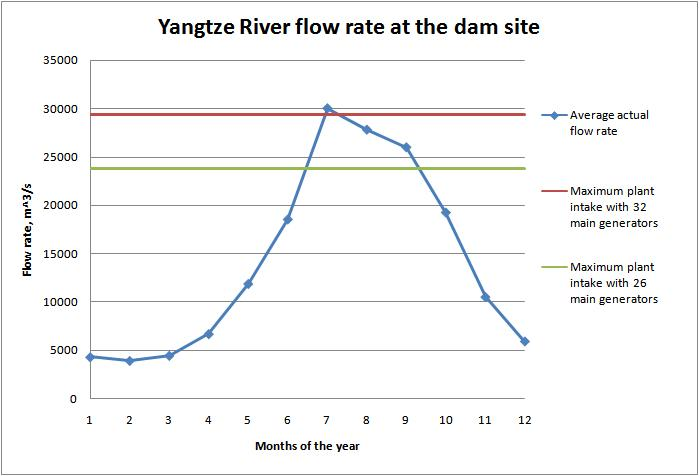
Yangtze River flow rate comparing to the dam intake capacity

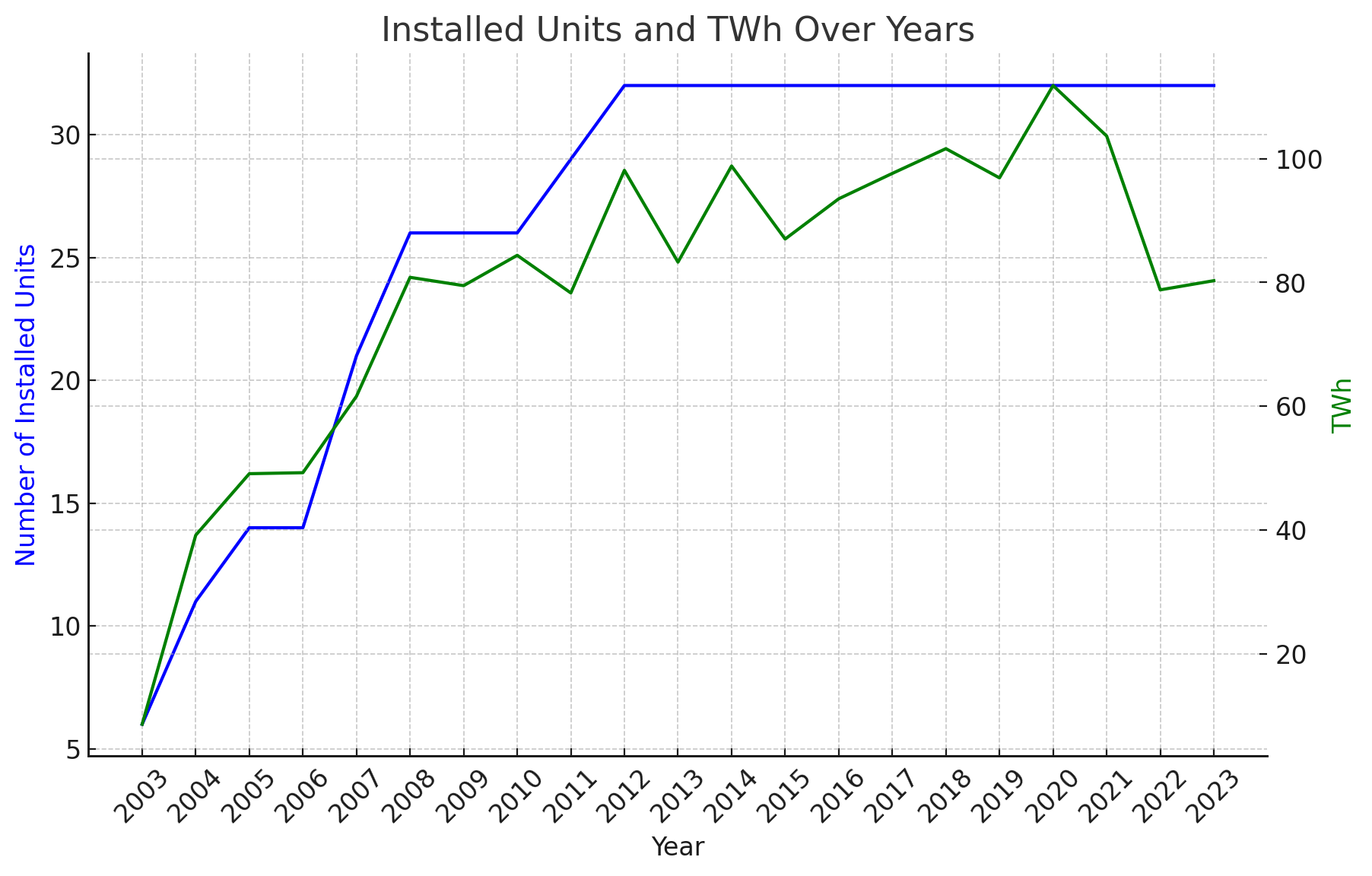
Three Gorges Dam Installed Units and Annual Electricity Production Over Years (2003–2023)

By August 16, 2011, the plant had generated 500 TWh of electricity. In July 2008 it generated 10.3 TWh of electricity, its first month over 10 TWh. On June 30, 2009, after the river flow rate increased to over 24,000 m^{3}/s, all 28 generators were switched on, producing only 16,100 MW because the head available during flood season is insufficient. During an August 2009 flood, the plant first reached its maximum output for a short period.

During the November to May dry season, power output is limited by the river's flow rate, as seen in the diagrams on the right. When there is enough flow, power output is limited by plant generating capacity. The maximum power-output curves were calculated based on the average flow rate at the dam site, assuming the water level is 175 m and the plant gross efficiency is 90.15%. The actual power output in 2008 was obtained based on the monthly electricity sent to the grid.

The Three Gorges Dam reached its design-maximum reservoir water level of 175 m (574 ft) for the first time on October 26, 2010, in which the intended annual power-generation capacity of 84.7 TWh was realized. It has a combined generating capacity of 22.5 gigawatts and a designed annual generation capacity of 88.2 TWh. In 2012, the dam's 32 generating units generated a record 98.1 TWh of electricity, which accounts for 14% of China's total hydro generation. Between 2012 (first year with all 32 generating units operating) and 2021, the dam generated an average of 97.22 TWh of electricity per year, higher than Itaipu dam's average of 89.22 TWh of electricity per year during the same period. Due to the extensive 2020 monsoon season rainfall, the annual production reached ~112 TWh that year, which broke the previous world record of annual production by Itaipu Dam equal to ~103 TWh.

=== Distribution ===
The State Grid Corporation and China Southern Power Grid paid a flat rate of ¥250 per MWh (US$35.7) until July 2, 2008. Since then, the price has varied by province, from ¥228.7 to ¥401.8 per MWh. Higher-paying customers, such as Shanghai, receive priority. Nine provinces and two cities consume power from the dam.

Power distribution and transmission infrastructure cost about 34.387 billion yuan. Construction was completed in December 2007, one year ahead of schedule.

Power is distributed over multiple 500 kV transmission lines. Three direct current (DC) lines to the East China Grid carry 7,200 MW: Three Gorges – Shanghai (3,000 MW), HVDC Three Gorges – Changzhou (3,000 MW), and HVDC Gezhouba – Shanghai (1,200 MW). The alternating current (AC) lines to the Central China Grid have a total capacity of 12,000 MW. The DC transmission line HVDC Three Gorges – Guangdong to the South China Grid has a capacity of 3,000 MW.

The dam was expected to provide 10% of China's power. However, electricity demand has increased more quickly than previously projected. Even fully operational and despite its size, on average, it supplied less than 1.0% of electricity demand in China in the year of 2024 when the Chinese electricity demand reached 9,852.1 TWh.

== Environmental impact ==
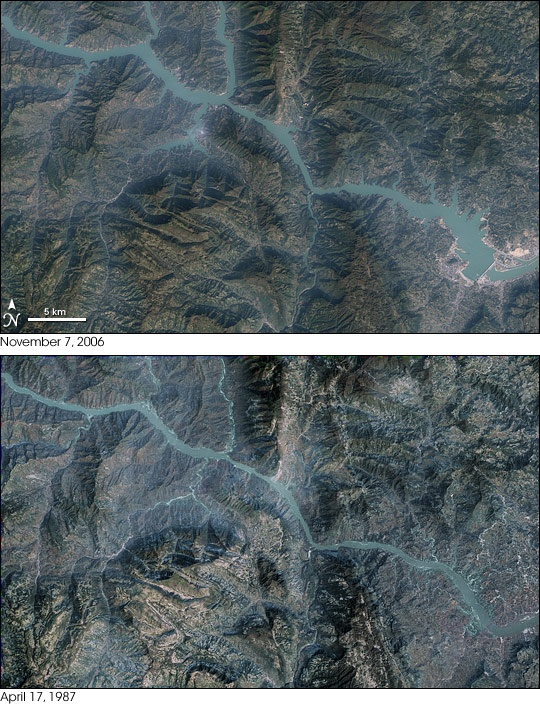
Satellite map showing areas flooded by the Three Gorges reservoir. Compare November 7, 2006 (above) with April 17, 1987 (below).

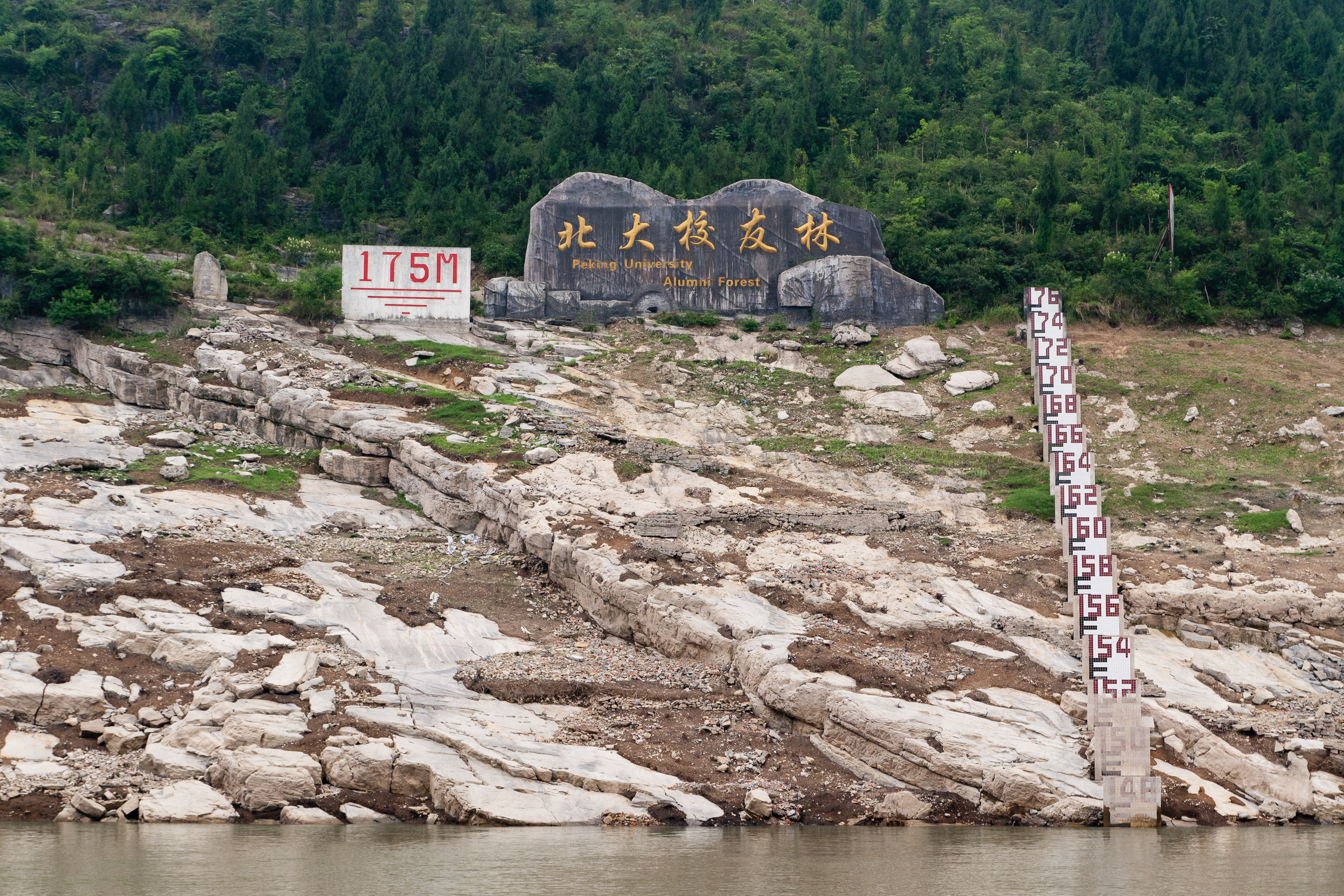
Flood mark on Yangtze river

=== Emissions ===
According to the National Development and Reform Commission, 366 grams of coal would produce 1 kWh of electricity during 2006. According to the dam's operator, China Three Gorges Corporation, the project's cumulative power production from 2003 to 2007 was equivalent to saving 84 million tonnes of standard coal.

However, the dam's localized greenhouse gas footprint remains a subject of ongoing scientific study. Independent research indicates that the reservoir itself generates biogenic emissions, outputting an estimated average of 359,000 tonnes of carbon dioxide and 3,810 tonnes of methane annually. High levels of methane are notably released during the summer months from vegetation rotting in exposed drawdown zones when the reservoir water levels are lowered.

=== Erosion and sedimentation ===
Two hazards are uniquely identified with the dam: that sedimentation projections are not agreed upon, and that the dam sits on a seismic fault. At current levels, 80% of the land in the area is eroding, depositing about 40 million tons of sediment into the Yangtze annually. Because the flow is slower above the dam, much of this sediment settles there instead of flowing downstream, and there is less sediment downstream.

The absence of silt downstream has three effects:

- Some hydrologists expect downstream riverbanks to become more vulnerable to flooding.
- Shanghai, more than 1,600 km (990 mi) away, rests on a massive sedimentary plain. The "arriving silt – so long as it does arrive – strengthens the bed on which Shanghai is built ... the less the tonnage of arriving sediment the more vulnerable is this biggest of Chinese cities to inundation".
- Benthic sediment buildup causes biological damage and reduces aquatic biodiversity.

=== Seismic activity ===
A 2017 study reviewing multi-source digital observation data has found that earthquake frequency is significantly correlated to water levels, and has "remarkably increased compared to that before water impoundment", and that micro and small earthquakes will continuously occur in the reservoir area, with the maximum magnitude not expected to exceed M5.5

=== Landslides ===
Erosion in the reservoir, induced by rising water, causes frequent major landslides that have led to noticeable disturbance in the reservoir surface, including two incidents in May 2009 when somewhere between 20,000 and 50,000 cubic metres (26,000 and 65,000 yd^{3}) of material plunged into the flooded Wuxia Gorge of the Wu River. In the first four months of 2010, there were 97 significant landslides.

=== Waste management ===
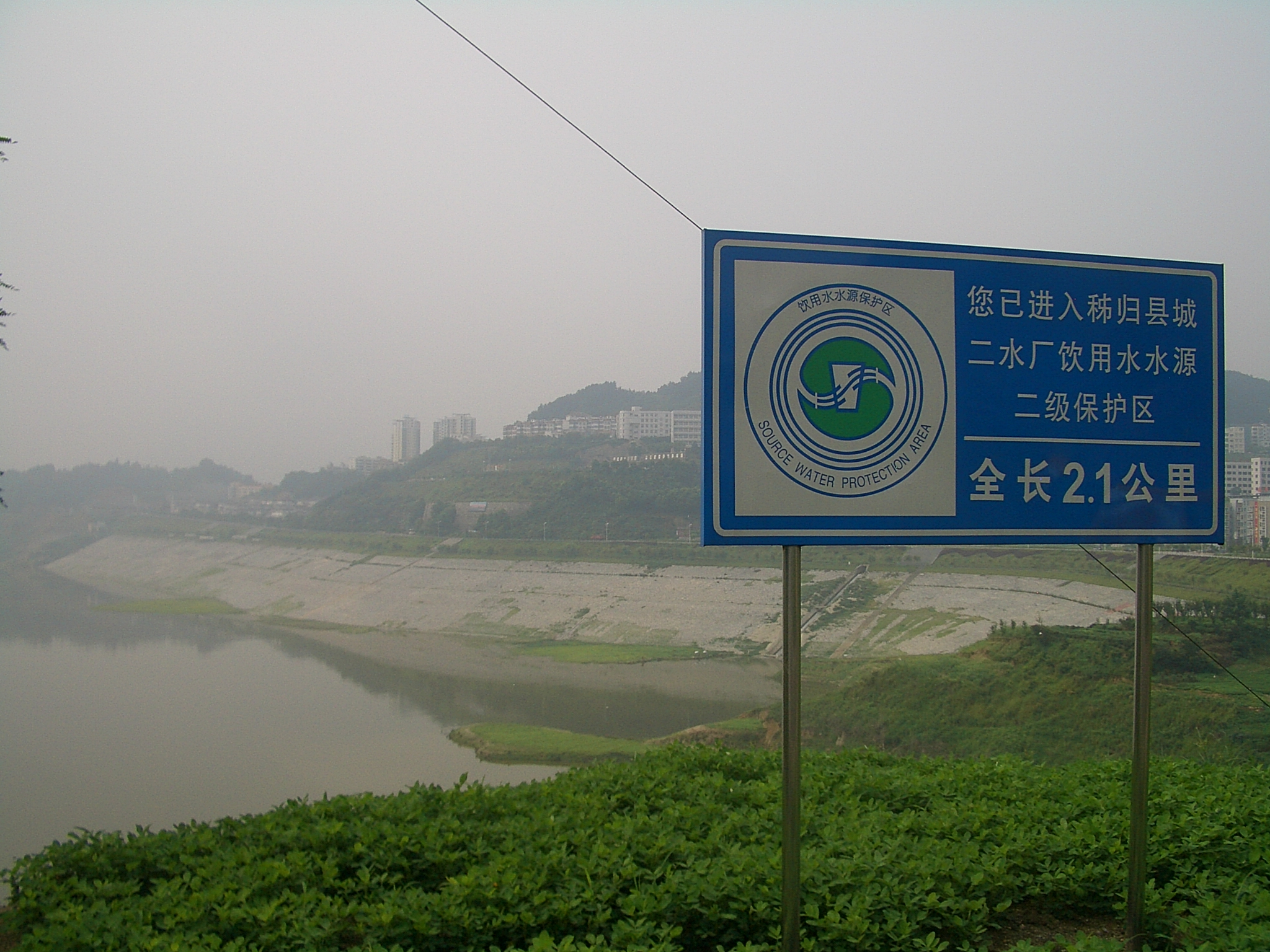
Zigui County seat source water protection area in Maoping Town, a few kilometres upstream of the dam

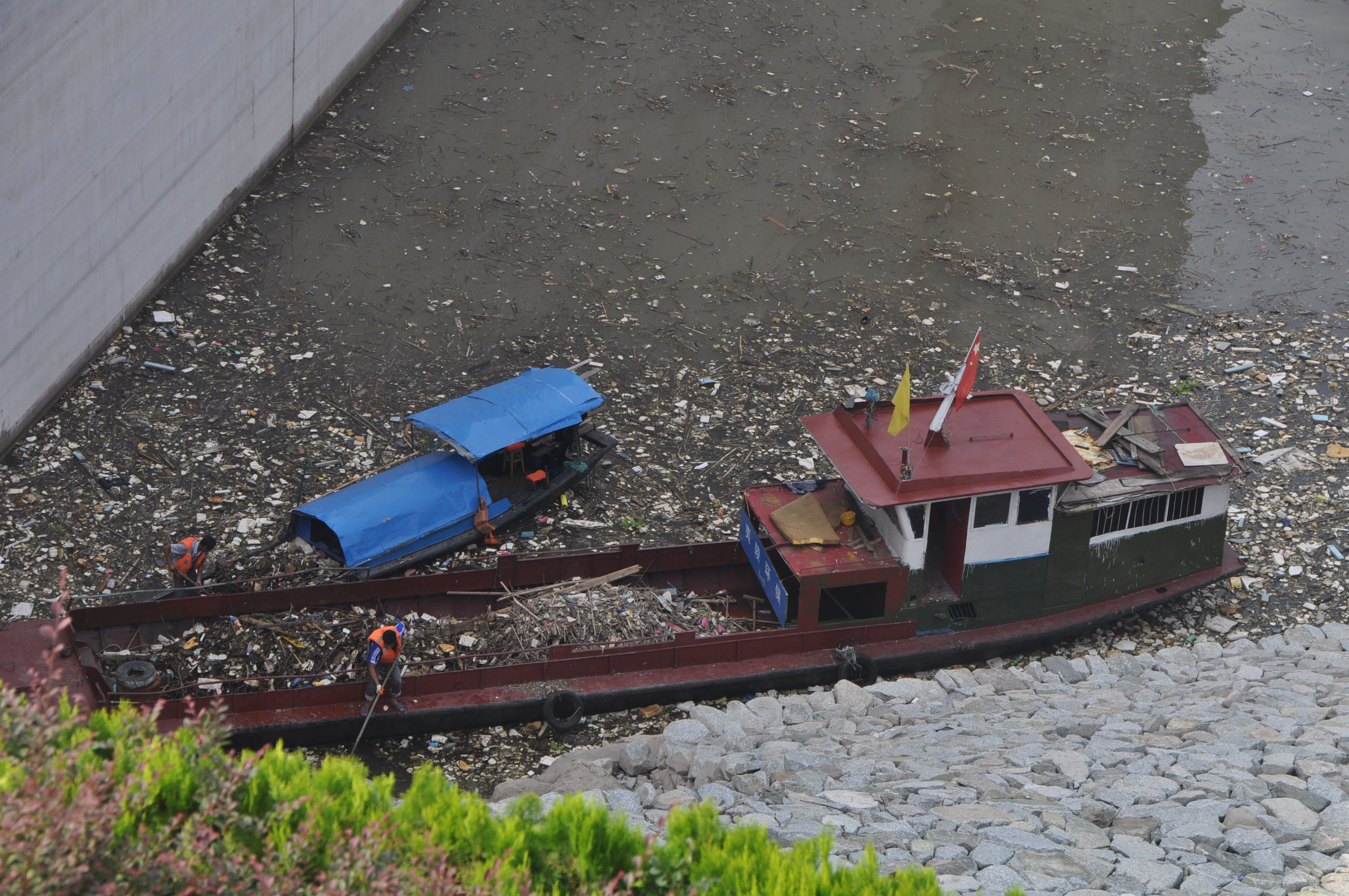
Collecting garbage at the dam's southeast corner

The dam catalyzed improved upstream wastewater treatment around Chongqing and its suburban areas. According to the Ministry of Environmental Protection, as of April 2007, more than 50 new plants could treat 1.84 million tonnes per day, 65% of the total need. About 32 landfills were added, which could handle 7,664.5 tonnes of solid waste every day. Over one billion tons of wastewater are released annually into the river, which was more likely to be swept away before the reservoir was created. This has left the water stagnant, polluted and murky.

=== Forest cover ===
In 1997, the Three Gorges area had 10% forestation, down from 20% in the 1950s.

Research by the United Nations Food and Agriculture Organization suggested that the Asia-Pacific region would gain about 6,000 km^{2} (2,300 sq mi) of forest by 2008. That is a significant change from the 13,000 km^{2} (5,000 sq mi) net loss of forest each year in the 1990s. This is largely due to China's large reforestation effort. This accelerated after the 1998 Yangtze River floods convinced the government that it should restore tree cover, especially in the Yangtze's basin upstream of the Three Gorges Dam.

=== Wildlife ===
Concerns about the dam's impact on wildlife predate the National People's Congress's approval in 1992. This region has long been known for its rich biodiversity. It is home to 6,388 plant species, which belong to 238 families and 1,508 genera. Of these species, 57 are endangered. These rare species are also used as ingredients in traditional Chinese medicines. The proportion of forested area in the region surrounding the Three Gorges Dam dropped from 20% in 1950 to less than 10% as of 2002, adversely affecting all plant species there. The region also provides habitats to hundreds of freshwater and terrestrial animal species. Freshwater fish are especially affected by dams due to changes in the water temperature and flow regime. Many other fish are injured in the hydroelectric plants' turbine blades. This is particularly detrimental to the region's ecosystem because the Yangtze River basin is home to 361 different fish species and accounts for 27% of China's endangered freshwater fish species. Other aquatic species have been endangered by the dam, particularly the baiji, or Chinese river dolphin, now extinct. In fact, Chinese Government scholars even claim that the Three Gorges Dam directly caused the extinction of the baiji.

Of the 3,000 to 4,000 remaining critically endangered Siberian crane, many spend the winter in wetlands that the Three Gorges Dam will destroy. Populations of the Yangtze sturgeon are guaranteed to be "negatively affected" by the dam. In 2022 the Chinese paddlefish was declared extinct, with the last confirmed sighting in 2003.

=== Terrestrial impact ===
In 2005, NASA scientists calculated that the shift of water mass stored by the dams would increase the total length of the Earth's day by 0.06 microseconds and make the Earth slightly more round in the middle and flat on the poles. A study published in 2022 in the journal Open Geosciences suggests that the change of reservoir water level affects the gravity field in western Sichuan, which in turn affects the seismicity in that area.

== Floods, agriculture, industry ==
Water level and inflow during the 2020 China floods

An important function of the dam is to control flooding, which is a major problem for the seasonal river of the Yangtze. Millions of people live downstream of the dam, with many large, important cities like Wuhan, Nanjing, and Shanghai next to the river. Large areas of farmland and China's most important industrial area are by the river.

The reservoir's flood storage capacity is 22 km^{3} (5.3 mi^{3}; 18 million acre⋅ft). This capacity will reduce the frequency of major downstream flooding from once every 10 years to once every 100 years. The dam is expected to minimize the effect of even a "super" flood. The river flooded in 1954 over an area of 193,000 km^{2} (74,500 mi^{2}), killing 33,167 people and forcing almost 18.9 million people to move. The flood waters covered Wuhan, a city of eight million people, for over three months, and the Jingguang Railway was out of service for more than 100 days. The 1954 flood carried 50 cubic kilometres (12 cu mi) of water. The dam could only divert the water above Chenglingji, leaving 30 to 40 km^{3} (7.2 to 9.6 mi^{3}) to be diverted. The dam cannot protect against some of the large tributaries downstream, including the Xiang, Zishui, Yuanshui, Lishui, Hanshui, and Gan.

In 1998, a flood in the same area caused billions of dollars' worth of damage, when 2,039 km^{2} (787 mi^{2}) of farmland were flooded. The flood affected more than 2.3 million people, killing 1,526. In early August 2009, the largest flood in five years passed through the dam site. During this flood, the dam limited the water flow to less than 40,000 m^{3}/s (1.4 million cu ft/s) per second, raising the upstream water level from 145.13 m (476.1 ft) on August 1, to 152.88 m (501.6 ft) on August 8. A full 4.27 km^{3} (1.02 cu mi) of flood water was captured and the river flow was cut by as much as 15,000 m^{3} (530,000 cu ft) per second.

The dam discharges its reservoir during the dry season every year, between December and March. This increases the flow rate of the river downstream, providing fresh water for agricultural and industrial usage, and improving shipping conditions. The water level upstream drops from 175 to 145 m (574 to 476 ft), in preparation for the rainy season. The water also powers the Gezhouba Dam downstream.

Since the filling of the reservoir in 2003, the Three Gorges Dam has supplied an extra 11 km^{3} (2.6 cu mi) of fresh water to downstream cities and farms over the course of the dry season.

During the South China floods in July 2010, inflows at the Three Gorges Dam reached a peak of 70,000 m^{3}/s (2.5 million cu ft/s), exceeding the peak inflow during the 1998 Yangtze River floods. The dam's reservoir rose nearly 3 m (9.8 ft) in 24 hours and reduced the outflow to 40,000 m^{3}/s (1.4 million cu ft/s) in discharges downstream, preventing any significant impact on the middle and lower river.

== Navigating the dam ==
=== Locks ===
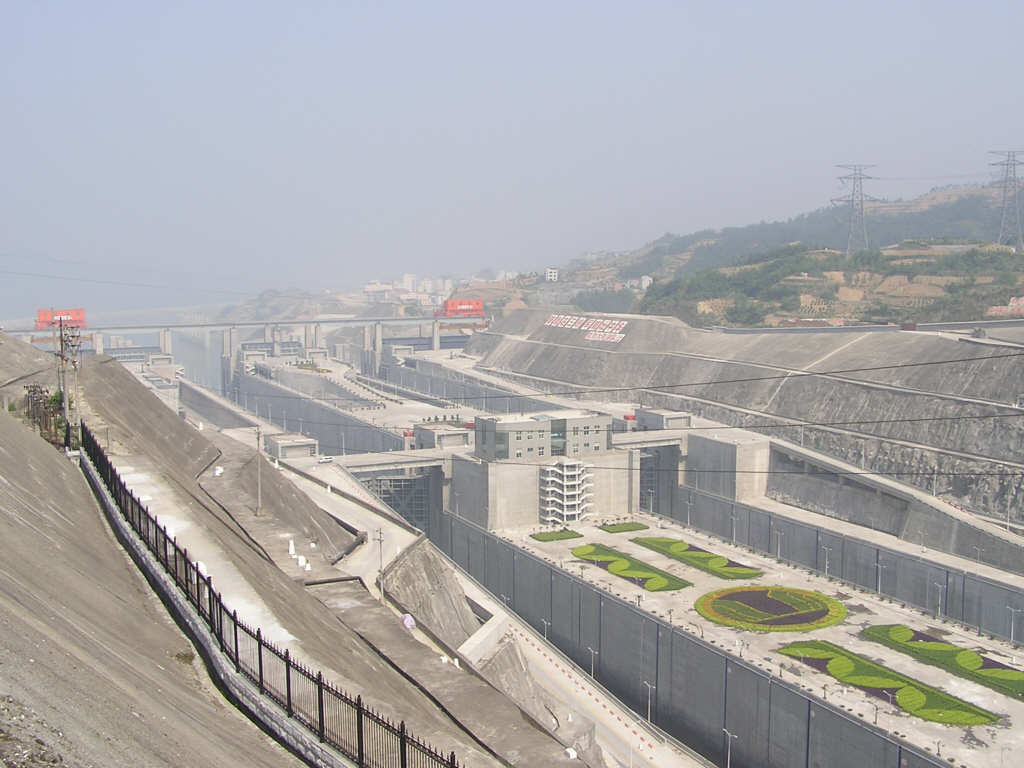
Ship locks for river traffic to bypass the Three Gorges Dam, May 2004

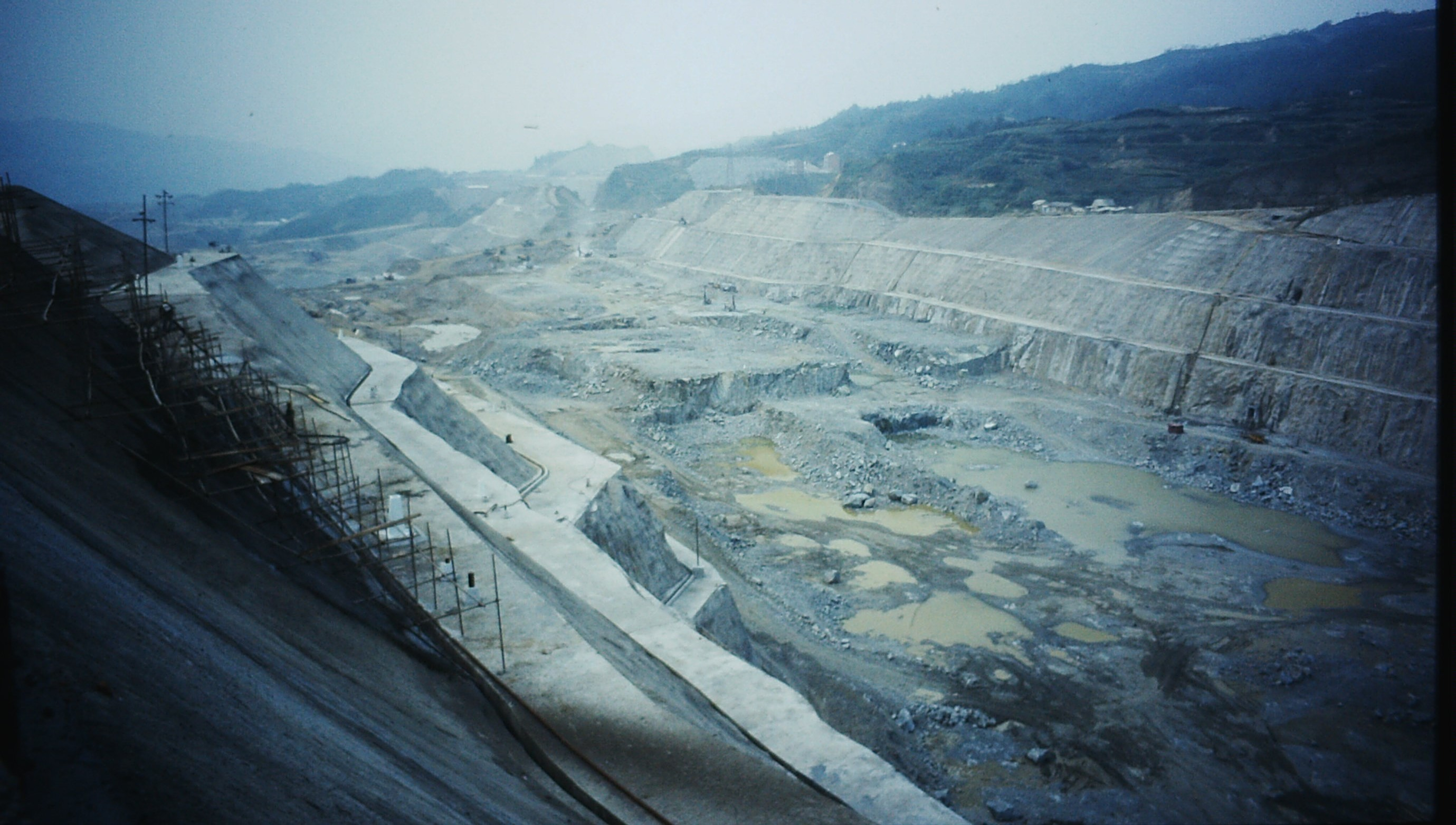
Construction of TGP ship locks at Yangtze River, September 1996

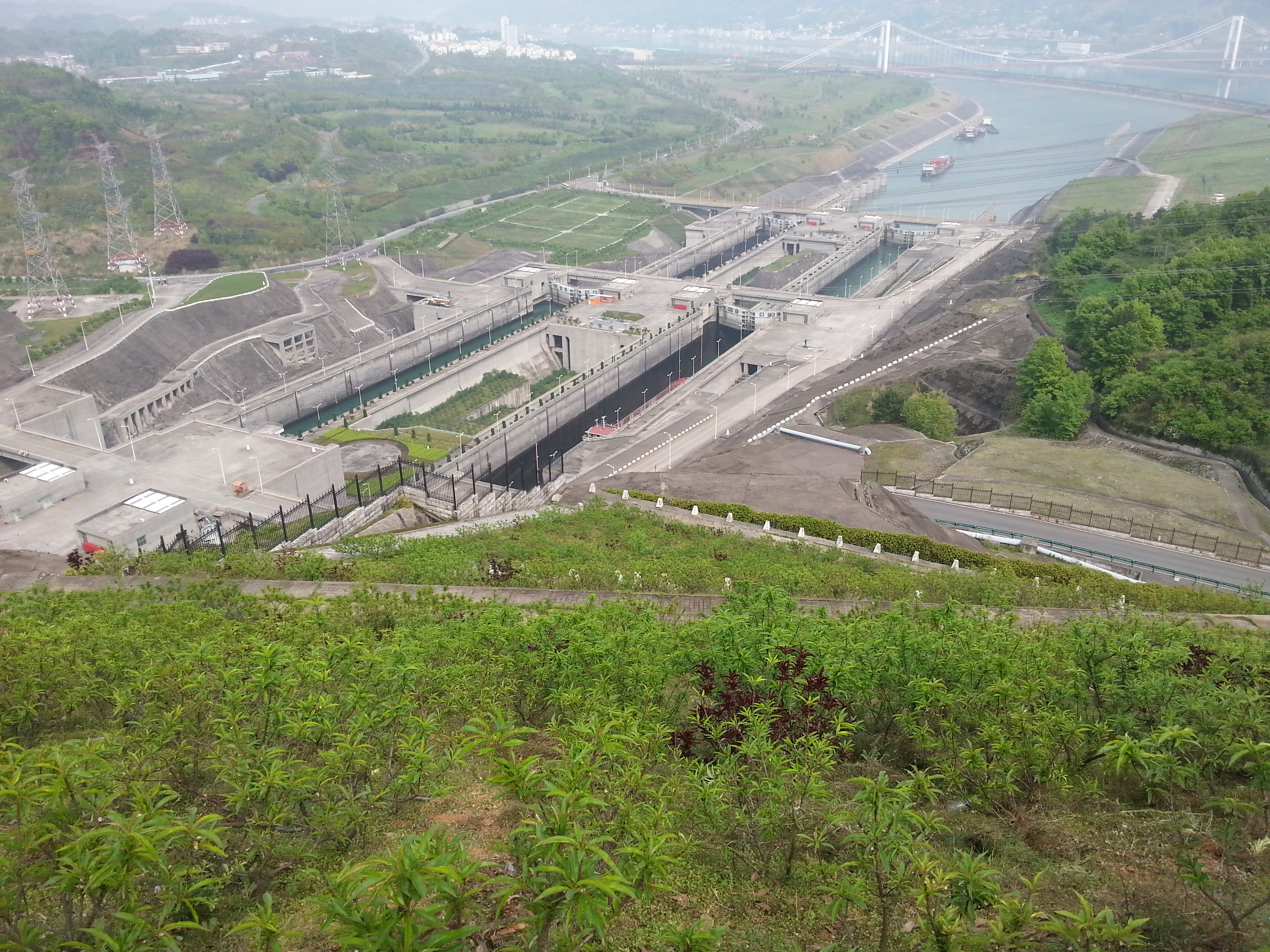
The other end of Three Gorges Dam lock. Note the bridge in the background.

The Three Gorges project includes locks to enable ships to pass the dam. Since the undammed gorges had been dangerous to navigate, officials said, the project would enable shipping on the Yangtze to rise from ten million to 100 million tonnes annually and would reduce shipping costs by roughly one-third.

There are two series of ship locks installed near the dam (30°50′12″N 111°1′10″E). Each of them is made up of five stages, with transit time at around four hours. Maximum vessel size is 10,000 tons. The locks are 280 m long, 35 m wide, and 5 m deep (918 × 114 × 16.4 ft). That is 30 m (98 ft) longer than those on the St Lawrence Seaway, but half as deep.

Before the dam was constructed, the maximum freight capacity at the Three Gorges site was 18.0 million tonnes per year. From 2004 to 2007, a total of 198 million tonnes of freight passed through the locks. The freight capacity of the river increased six times and the cost of shipping was reduced by 25%. Originally, the total capacity of the ship locks was expected to reach 100 million tonnes per year. In 2022, their cargo turnover reached 159.65 million tons, with an annual increase of 6% over the previous few years.

These locks are staircase locks, whereby inner lock gate pairs serve as both the upper gate of the chamber below and the lower gate of the chamber above. The gates are the vulnerable hinged type, which, if damaged, could temporarily render the entire flight unusable. As there are separate sets of locks for upstream and downstream traffic, this system is more water efficient than bi-directional staircase locks.

=== Ship lift ===
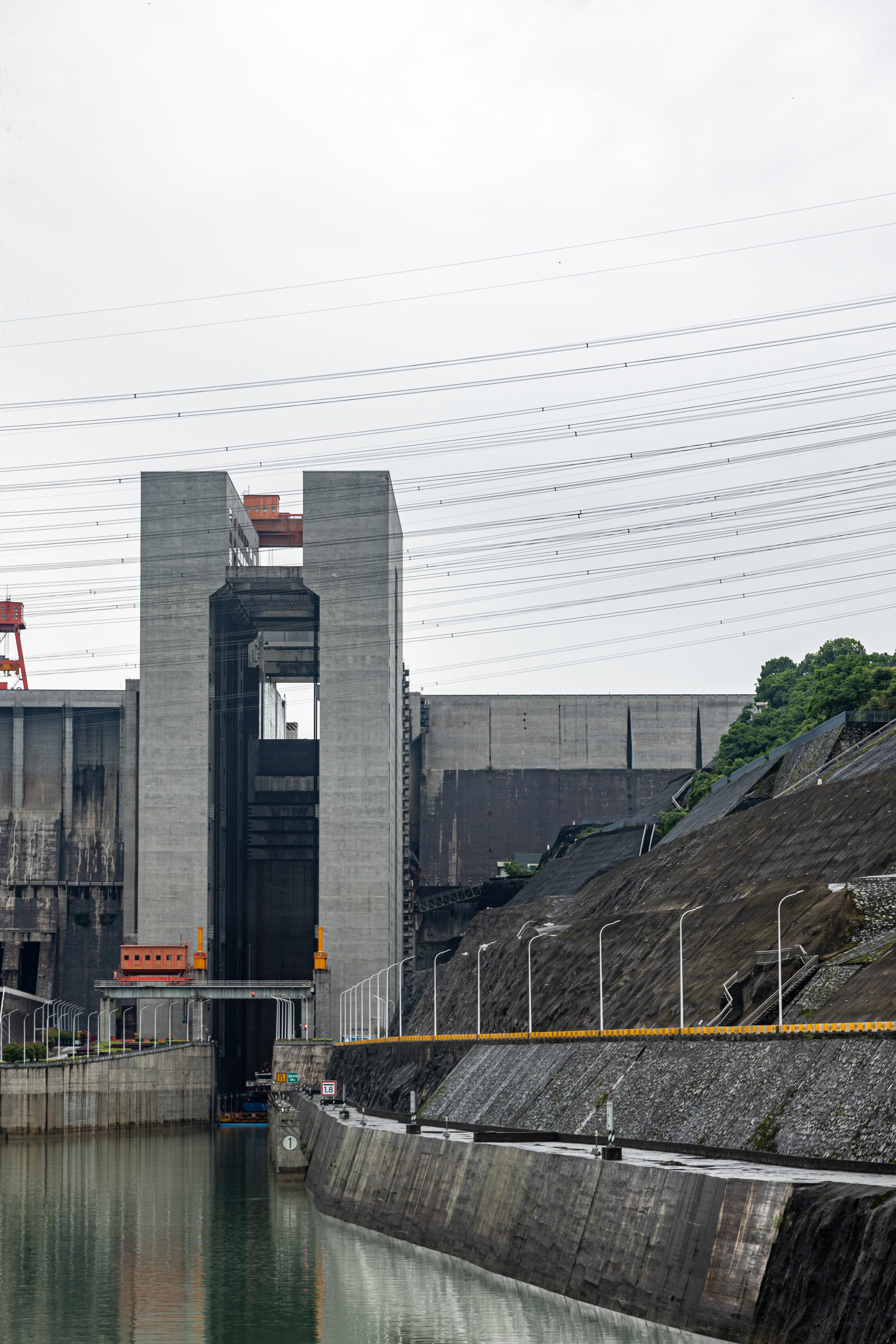
The ship lift, a kind of elevator, can lift vessels of up to 3,000 tonnes in a fraction of the time required to transit the staircase locks.

Since 2016, a ship lift—a kind of elevator for vessels—has operated at the site. The ship lift can lift ships of up to 3,000 tons. The vertical distance traveled is 113 m (371 ft), and the size of the ship lift's basin is 120 m × 18 m × 3.5 m (394 ft × 59 ft × 11 ft). The ship lift takes 30 to 40 minutes to transit, as opposed to the three to four hours for stepping through the locks. One complicating factor is that the water level can vary dramatically. The ship lift must work even if water levels vary by 12 m (39 ft) on the lower side, and 30 m (98 ft) on the upper side.

The ship lift's design uses a helical gear system, to climb or descend a toothed rack.

The ship lift was not yet complete when the rest of the project was officially opened on May 20, 2006. In November 2007, it was reported in the local media that construction of the ship lift started in October 2007.

In February 2012, Xinhua reported that the four towers intended to support the ship lift were nearly complete. The report said that by that time, the towers had reached 189 m (620 ft) of the anticipated 195 m (640 ft).

As of May 2014, the ship lift was expected to be completed by July 2015. It was tested in December 2015 and announced complete in January 2016. Lahmeyer, the German firm that designed the ship lift, said it will take a vessel less than an hour to transit the lift. An article in Steel Construction says the actual time of the lift will be 21 minutes. It says that the expected dimensions of the 3,000 t (3 million kg) passenger vessels the ship lift's basin was designed to carry will be 84.5 by 17.2 by 2.65 metres (277.2 ft × 56.4 ft × 8.7 ft). The moving mass (including counterweights) is 34,000 tonnes.

The trials of elevator finished in July 2016, the first cargo ship was lifted on July 15; the lift time was 8 minutes. Shanghai Daily reported that the first operational use of the lift was on September 18, 2016, when limited "operational testing" of the lift began.

=== Portage railways ===
Plans also exist for the construction of short portage railways bypassing the dam area altogether. Two short rail lines, one on each side of the river, are to be constructed. The 88-kilometre-long (55 mi) northern portage railway (北岸翻坝铁路) will run from the Taipingxi port facility (太平溪港) on the northern side of the Yangtze, just upstream from the dam, via Yichang East Railway Station to the Baiyang Tianjiahe port facility in Baiyang Town (白洋镇), below Yichang. The 95-kilometre-long (59 mi) southern portage railway (南岸翻坝铁路) will run from Maoping (upstream of the dam) via Yichang South Railway Station to Zhicheng (on the Jiaozuo–Liuzhou Railway).

In late 2012, preliminary work started along both future railway routes.

== Displacement of residents ==
During planning, it was estimated that 13 cities, 140 towns and 1,350 villages would be partially or completely flooded by the reservoir, amounting to roughly 1.5% of Hubei's 60.3 million people and Chongqing Municipality's 31.44 million people. These people were moved to new homes by the Chinese government, which considered the displacement justified by the flood protection provided for the communities downstream of the dam.

Between 2002 and 2005, Canadian photographer Edward Burtynsky documented the impact of the project on the surrounding areas, including the town of Wanzhou. Other photographers who recorded the change include Chengdu-based Muge, Paris-based Zeng Nian (originally from Jiangsu), and Israeli Nadav Kander. Living conditions deteriorated for many, and hundreds of thousands of people could not find work. The older generation was particularly affected, but younger generations benefited from the educational and career opportunities afforded by moving to large cities with new, modern companies and schools.

Some 2007 reports claimed that Chongqing Municipality would encourage four million more people to move away from the dam to Chongqing's main urban area by 2020. The municipal government asserted that the relocation was driven by urbanization, rather than a direct result of the dam project, and that the people involved included other areas of the municipality.

By June 2008, China had moved 1.24 million residents as far as Gaoyang in Hebei Province, and the moves concluded the following month.

== Other effects ==
=== Cultural and history ===
The flooded area behind the dam includes locations with significant cultural history. The State Council authorized a ¥505 million archaeology salvage effort. Over the course of several years, archaeologists excavated 723 sites and conducted surface archaeology recovery missions at an additional 346 sites. Archaeologists recovered 200,000 artifacts of which 13,000 were considered as particularly historically or culturally notable. As part of this effort, the old Chongqing City Museum was replaced by the Chongqing China Sanxia Museum to house many of the recovered artifacts.

Recovered structures that were too large for museums were moved upland to reconstruction districts (fu jian qu), which are outdoor museum parks. Recovered structures placed in such parks include temples, pavilions, houses and bridges.

Some sites could not be moved because of their location, size, or design, such as the hanging coffins site high in the Shen Nong Gorge, part of the cliffs.

=== National security ===
A 2004 United States Department of Defense report stated that "Since Taipei cannot match Beijing's ability to field offensive systems, proponents of strikes against the mainland apparently hope that merely presenting credible threats to China's urban population or high-value targets, such as the Three Gorges Dam, will deter Chinese military coercion." In response, the Chinese Ministry of Foreign Affairs criticized the U.S. report as exhibiting a "Cold War mentality harbouring evil intentions." The People's Liberation Army Lieutenant General Liu Yuan cautioned that "[It] will not be able to stop war. It will have the exact opposite of the desired effect." He also remarked that China would be "seriously on guard against threats from Taiwan independence terrorists."

Sung Chao-wen, a senior advisory committee member of the Taiwanese Ministry of Defense, dismissed online comments about targeting the Three Gorges Dam with missiles as "ridiculous", saying that the dam's high-strength reinforced concrete could withstand a small nuclear weapon, any missile attack would have to penetrate multiple layers of ground and air defenses, and missiles would cause only minimal damage if they reached the dam at all. Zhang Boting, deputy secretary-general of the China Society for Hydropower Engineering, said that the Three Gorges Dam was designed as a concrete gravity dam and would therefore be resistant to nuclear attacks.

Debate among Chinese scholars and analysts about the basic principles of China's no first use (NFU) of nuclear weapons policy includes questions about whether to add narrow exceptions, such as acts that produce catastrophic consequences equivalent to that of a nuclear attack, including attacks intended to destroy the Three Gorges Dam. Nonetheless, supporters of the NFU policy maintain that foreign conventional attacks of such targets including the dam—with the intent to cause mass civilian casualties and economic losses—are highly improbable.

=== Structural integrity ===
Immediately after the reservoir was first filled, around 80 hairline cracks were observed in the dam's structure. Still, an experts group gave the project overall a good-quality rating. The 163,000 concrete units all passed quality testing, with normal deformation within design limits.

== Upstream dams ==
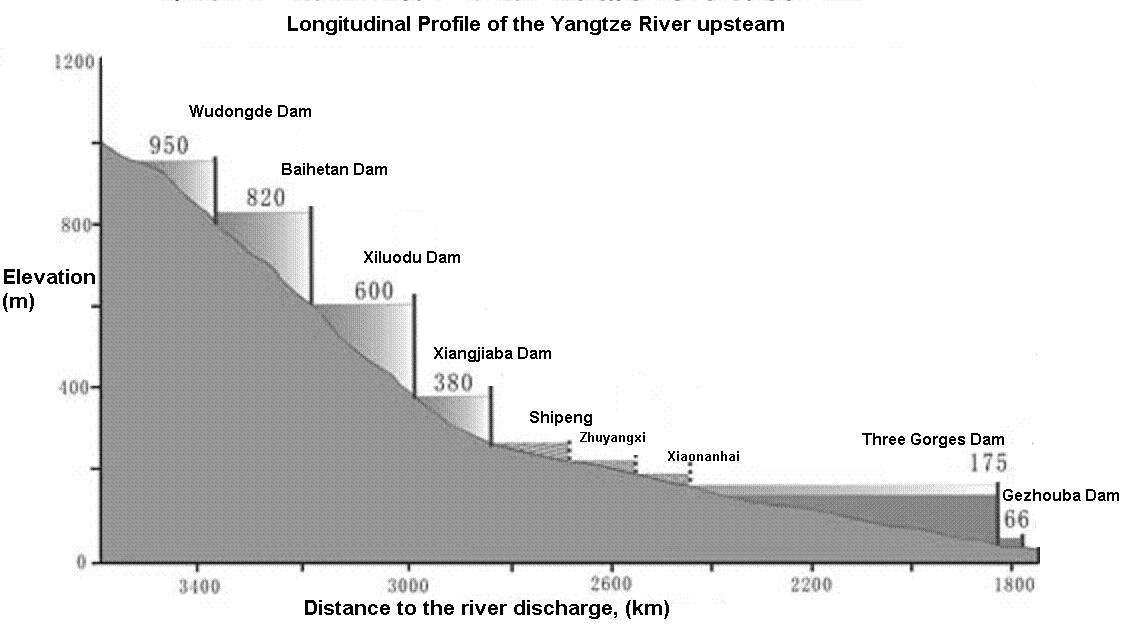
Longitudinal profile of upstream Yangtze River

In order to maximize the utility of the Three Gorges Dam and cut down on sedimentation from the Jinsha River, the upper course of the Yangtze River, authorities are building a series of dams on the Jinsha, including the now completed Wudongde, Baihetan, Xiluodu, and Xiangjiaba dams. The total capacity of those four dams is 38,500 MW, almost double the capacity of the Three Gorges.

Baihetan became fully operational in 2022. Wudongde was opened in June 2021. Another eight dams are in the midstream of the Jinsha and eight more upstream of it.

== See also ==
- Baiheliang Underwater Museum
- South–North Water Transfer Project
- Energy policy of China
- List of largest dams
- List of reservoirs by volume
- List of largest power stations
- List of largest hydroelectric power stations
- List of power stations in China
- List of dams and reservoirs in China
- Medog Hydropower Station - planned dam in the Brahmaputra River catchment that will produce more energy than Three Gorges
- Three Gorges Museum
- Liang Weiyan, one of the leading engineers who designed the water turbines for the dam
