= Maoping, Hubei =

Maoping 茅坪镇
- Town
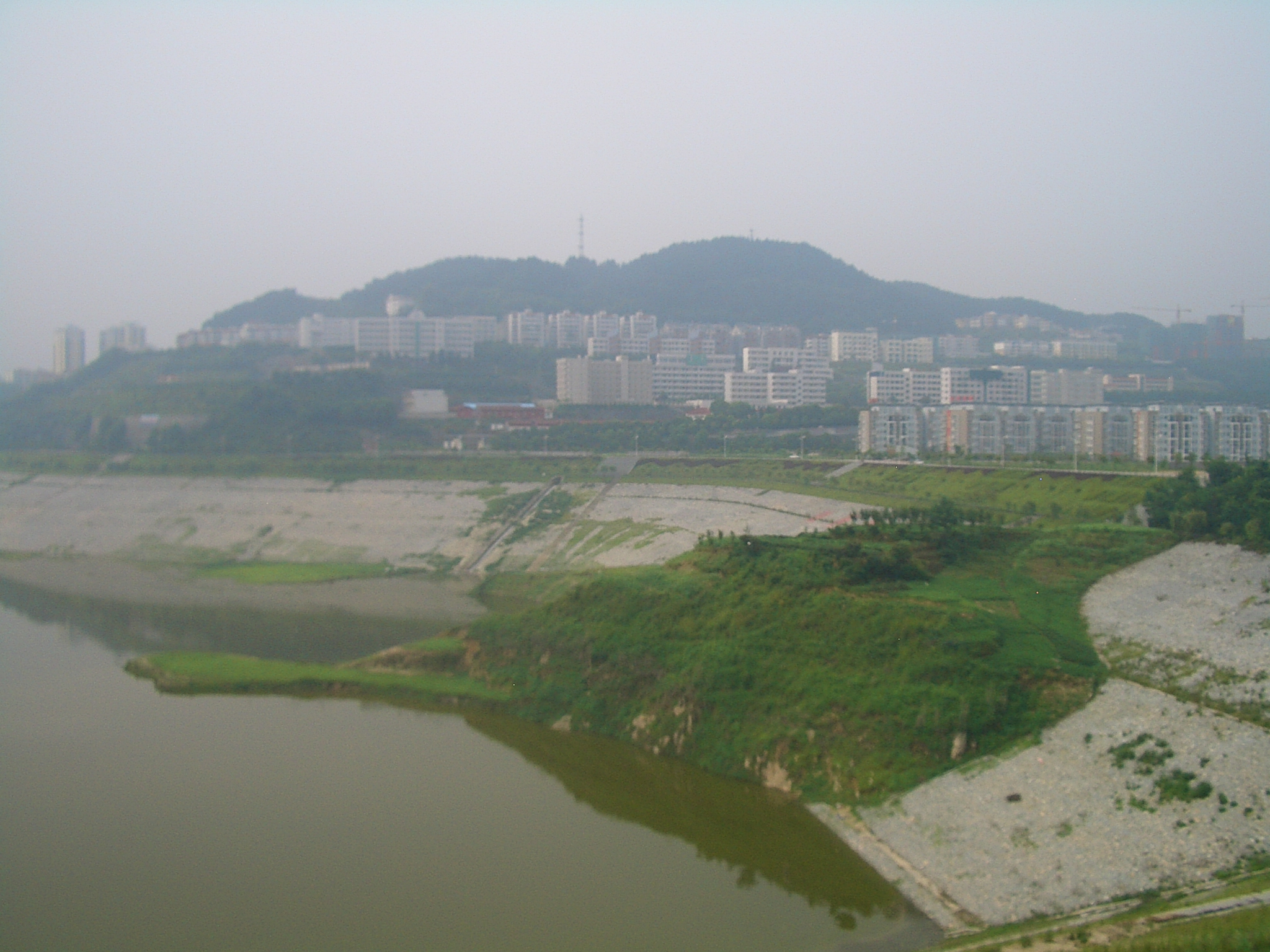
- Maoping seen from the west

- Location in Hubei
- Coordinates: 30°49′30″N 110°59′01″E
- Country: China
- Province: Hubei
- Prefecture-level city: Yichang
- County: Zigui
- Village-level divisions: 4 residential communities, 18 villages

Population (2010)
  - Total: 101,620
- Time zone: UTC+8 (China Standard)

Maoping (Chinese: 茅坪; pinyin: Máopíng) is a town in and the county seat of Zigui County, Yichang in the western part of Hubei province, China. It is the county seat of Zigui County, and as such is labeled simply as "Zigui" (秭归) or "Zigui County" (秭归县) on most less-detailed maps.

== Geography ==
The town is located on the right (southern) bank of the Yangtze, just upstream of the Three Gorges Dam, and offers a good view of the upstream side of the dam, as well as of an accessory dam which blocks off a valley on the southern side of the river from being flooded by the reservoir.

== Administrative Divisions ==
Four residential communities:

- Binhu (滨湖社区), Xichu (西楚社区), Jusong (橘颂社区), Danyang (丹阳社区)

Eighteen villages:

- Jingangcheng (金缸城村), Yinxingtuo (银杏沱村), Changling (长岭村), Chenjiachong (陈家冲村), Jiuli (九里村), Yangguidian (杨贵店村), Chenjiaba (陈家坝村), Jiandong (建东村), Xikouping (溪口坪村), Sixi (四溪村), Qiaojiaping (乔家坪村), Huaguoyuan (花果园村), Yueliangbao (月亮包村), Luojia (罗家村), Songshu'ao (松树坳村), Zhongbazi (中坝子村), Lanlingxi (兰陵溪村), Miaohe (庙河村)

== Transportation ==
The town's passenger dock (Zigui Gang, i.e. the Port of Zigui) is served by most boats traveling the Yangtze between Yichang and Chongqing. The bus station is a hub of local travel within the county and adjacent areas, and has frequent service to Yichang as well.
