= Yichang Metro =

Planned metro system in Yichang, China

Yichang Metro is a rapid transit system planned in Yichang, in Central China's Hubei province. It will include three lines.

== Lines ==
=== Line 1 ===
Line 1 is a line from Yiling Bus Terminal in Yiling District via Xiling District to Gongsheng in Wujiagang District.

=== Line 2 ===
Line 2 is a line from Gongtong Road(E) in Wujiagang District via Yichang East Railway Station, Yichang Sanxia Airport, Xiaoting District to Baiyang and it is planned to extend to Zhijiang in the future.

=== Line 3 ===
Line 3 is a line from Yiling Bus Terminal in Yiling District and transfer Line 1 at Yiling Square in Xiling District to Yichang South Railway Station in Dianjun District.

=== Planning Map ===
Yichang Metro Planning (2013)
