= Yichang South railway station =

Railway station in Yichang, China

Yichangnan 宜昌南

General information
- Location: Dianjun District, Yichang, Hubei; China
- Coordinates: 30.6786°N 111.2232°E
- Operated by: China Railway Corporation
- Line: Yiwan Railway
Location

Yichang South railway station is a freight-only railway station on the Yichang-Wanzhou Railway. It is located in Dianjun District of the city of Yichang, in Hubei Province of People's Republic of China. In early design documents it was called Dianjun Station (点军站).

== Service ==
The stations serves as an intermediate station of the Yichang-Wanzhou Railway. It does not offer any passenger service, as it is freight-only. It includes five tracks, one basic platform, one freight yard, and one network maintenance area. The station throughputs around 800,000 metric tons of freight per year.

== History ==
Construction on the station began in December 2004 and was finished towards the end of 2007. As the Yichang-Wanzhou Railway entered service in 2008, this station followed suite.

On December 26, 2019, the station, as the starting point of the Maoping Port Railway connecting to the Three Gorges Dam, started renovations under a construction period of 42 months. By 2022, the renovations had increased the traction tonnage of the station from 4,000 tons to 5,000 tons, resulting in a 25% increase in the cargo capacity of a single freight train and an annual increase in port handling capacity of over 4.7 million tons.

Every day, 26 freight trains pass through the station.
