= Yiling Yangtze River Bridge =

Yiling Yangtze River Bridge 夷陵长江大桥
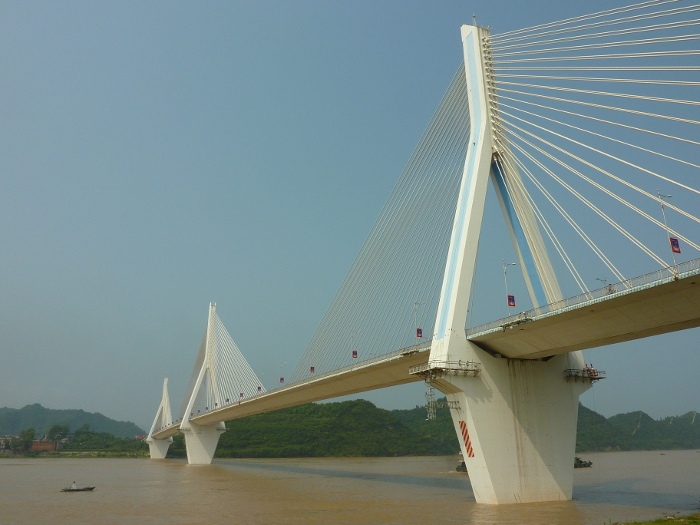
- Coordinates: 30.684131°N 111.289515°E
- Carries: Road/Motor Traffic (Four Lanes of roadway)
- Crosses: Yangtze River
- Locale: Wujiagang District, Hubei, China
- Official name: 夷陵长江大桥
- Other name: Yiling Yangtze Bridge

Characteristics
- Design: Cable-stayed
- Total length: 936 m (3,071 ft)
- Width: 23 metres (75 ft)
- Height: 130 metres (430 ft)
- Longest span: North Span – 346 m (1,135 ft); South Span – 346 m (1,135 ft)
- No. of spans: 2

History
- Construction cost: 610 million ¥
- Opened: 20 December 2001

Location
- Interactive map of Yiling Yangtze River Bridge

The Yiling Yangtze River Bridge (Chinese: 夷陵长江大桥) is a cable-stayed bridge over the Yangtze River in the city-center of Yichang, Hubei. It has 3 towers and two main spans, with a total of 4 spans including the side spans. It is a road bridge which carries four lanes of roadway and has a toll booth at one end. The bridge has a singular cable tension system, which carries the deck from the center. The Bridge crosses the Yangtze River, near Dagongqiao in Yichang. The main spans are 346 meters each. At the end of the bridge, to the south there is a cloverleaf interchange after the toll booth which is and exchange for the road.

The bridge is 6.4 kilometers downriver from the Three Gorges Dam.

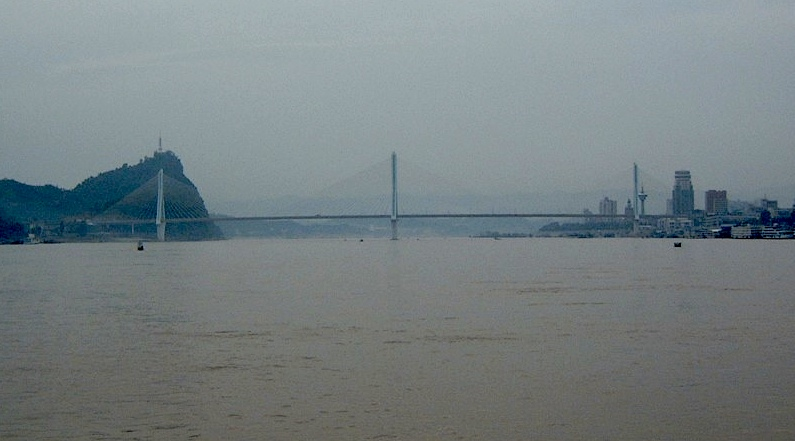
From downstream

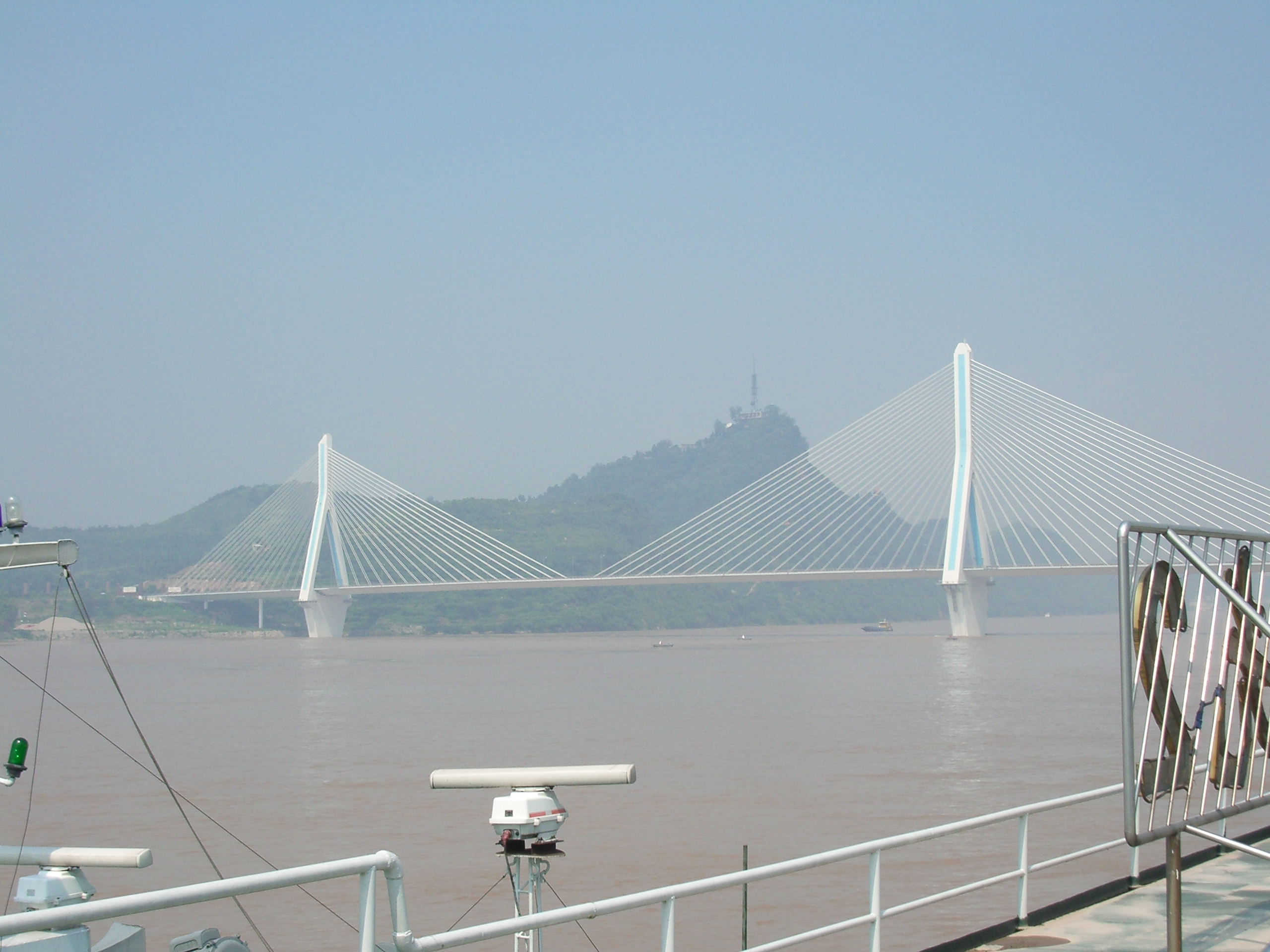
From Yichang Harbor

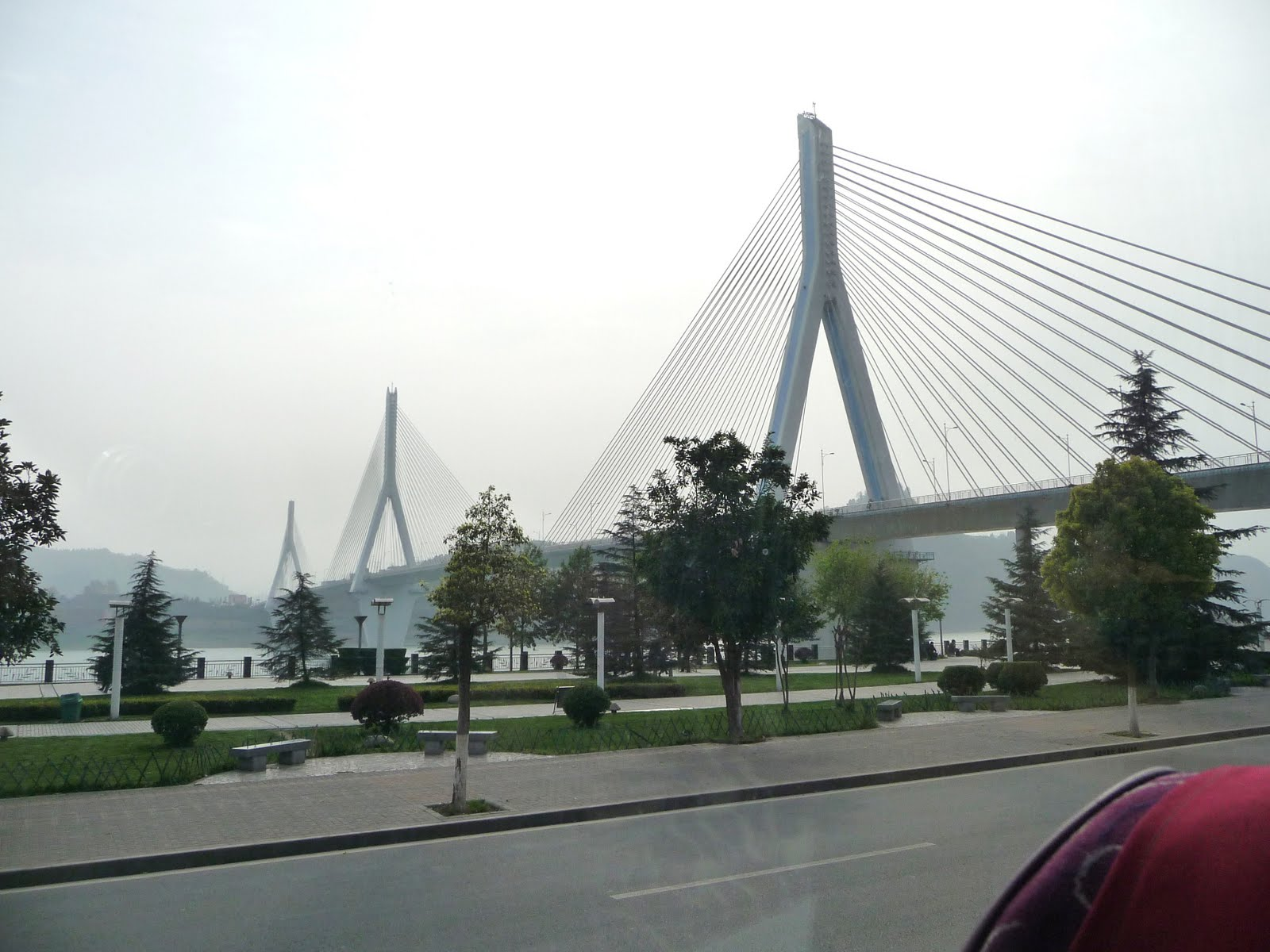
From northern shore

== See also ==
- Yangtze River bridges and tunnels
