= Dianjun, Yichang =

Dianjun 点军区
- District
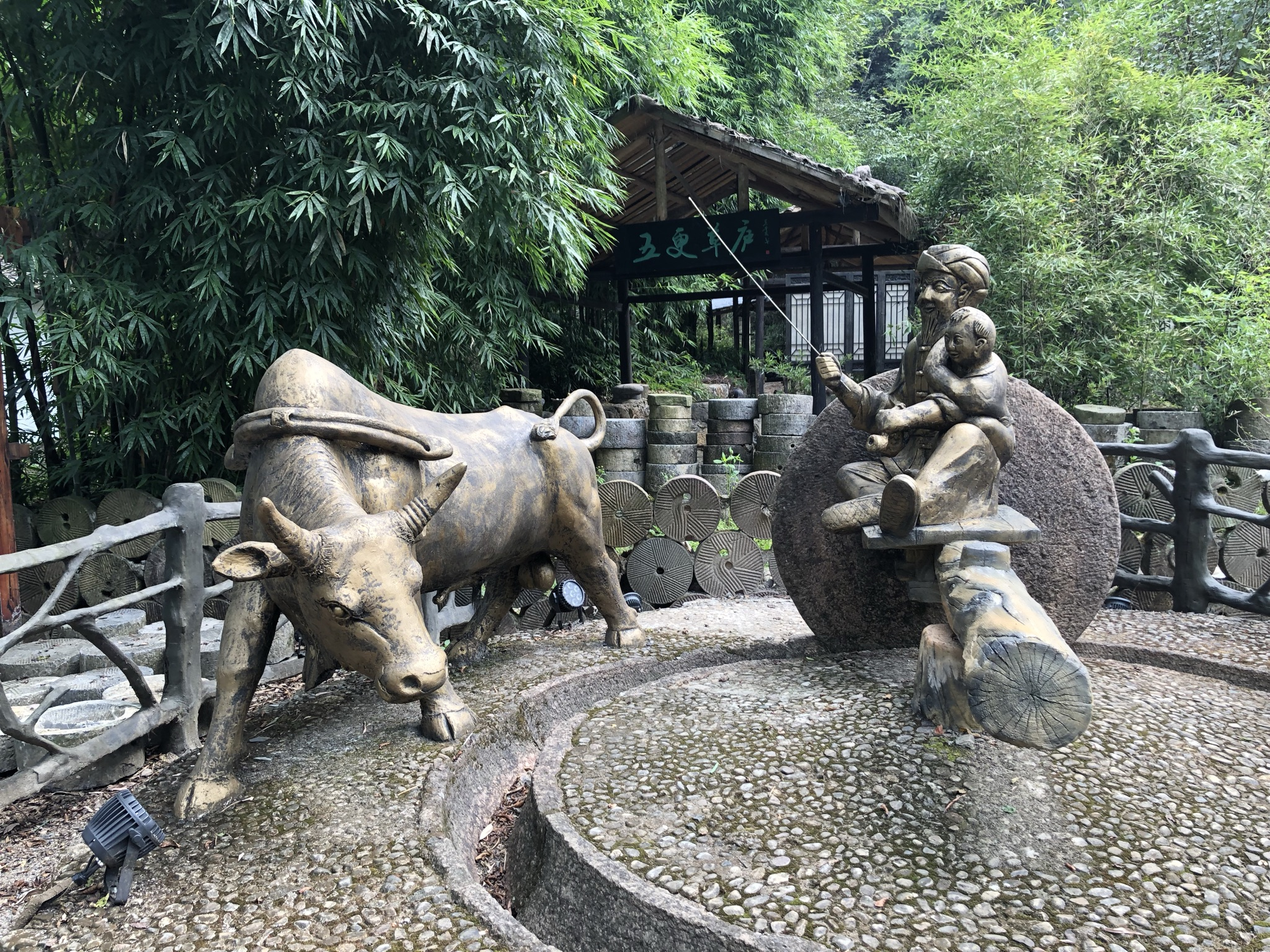
- Chexi

- Location in Hubei
- Coordinates: 30°41′15″N 111°15′29″E
- Country: People's Republic of China
- Province: Hubei
- Prefecture-level city: Yichang

Area
  - Total: 546 km^{2} (211 sq mi)

Population (2020)
  - Total: 101,649
  - Density: 186/km^{2} (482/sq mi)
- Time zone: UTC+8 (China Standard)
- Postal code: 443000
- Website: dianjun.gov.cn

Dianjun District (simplified Chinese: 点军区; traditional Chinese: 點軍區; pinyin: Diǎnjūn Qū) is a district of the city of Yichang, Hubei, People's Republic of China. In 2020 it had 101,649 residents.

The district is located on the right (southwestern) bank of the Yangtze, opposite the Yichang City center (which, administratively, forms Xiling District).

== Administrative divisions ==
Dianjun District is made up of one subdistrict, two towns and two townships.

The only subdistrict is Dianjun Subdistrict (点军街道)

Two towns:

- Aijia (艾家镇), Qiaobian (桥边镇)

Two townships:

- Lianpeng Township (联棚乡), Tucheng Township (土城乡)

== Transportation ==
Dianjun District is connected to Yichang's Xiling District by the Yiling Bridge (which carries Provincial Highway 323) and a railway bridge (which carries the Yichang-Wanzhou Railway).

Dianjun is served by the freight-only Yichang South Railway Station on the Yichang-Wanzhou Railway.
