= Xiling, Yichang =

Xiling 西陵区
- District
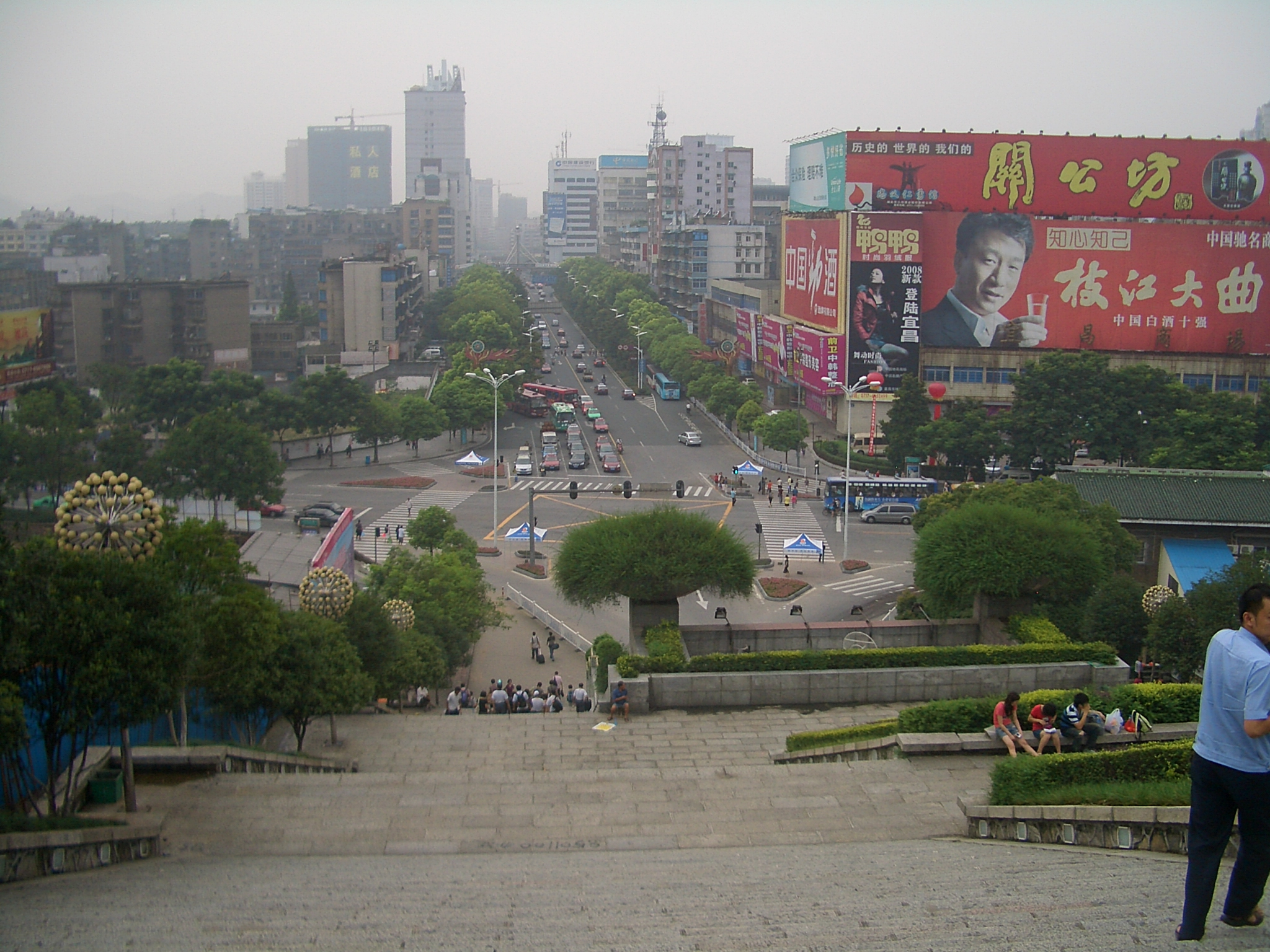
- Looking down one of Yichang's main streets

- Location in Hubei
- Coordinates: 30°42′18″N 111°17′23″E
- Country: China
- Province: Hubei
- Prefecture-level city: Yichang
- Established: December 13, 1986
- District seat: Xiling Subdistrict

Area
  - Total: 89.9 km^{2} (34.7 sq mi)

Population (2020 census)
  - Total: 537,686
  - Density: 5,980/km^{2} (15,500/sq mi)
- Time zone: UTC+8 (China Standard)
- Website: www.ycxl.gov.cn

Xiling (Chinese: 西陵区; pinyin: Xīlíng) is a district of Yichang, Hubei, China. It includes the central part of Yichang's urban area, on the left (northwestern) bank of the Yangtze River.

== History ==
In September 1949, the main part of the territory of modern-day Xiling was included in City Government Districts Two and Three (市人民政府第二、三區政府). Kangzhuang Road (康莊路), Fusui Road (福綏路) and Huaiyuan Road (懷遠路) were part of District One (第一區政府). In August 1950, these districts were eliminated and the city was governed by the police offices and resident committees.

In August 1952, the territory of modern-day Xiling District was divided amongst Yichang City People's Government's Second, Third, Fourth and Fifth Subdistrict Government Committees (“宜昌市人民政府第二、三、四、五街政委員會”). In March 1953, these committees were renamed as City Government Organ Subdistrict Offices (市政府的派出機關街道辦事處). In April 1956, these areas were named Binjianglu ("Riverfront Road") Subdistrict Office (濱江路街道辦事處), Jiefanglu ("Liberation Road") Subdistrict Office (解放路街道辦事處), Xueyuanjie ("School Street") Subdistrict Office (學院街街道辦事處), and Guloujie ("Drum Tower Street") Subdistrict Office (鼓樓街街道辦事處) respectively.

In May 1960, the Yichang government decided to make the five then-existing subdistricts (街道辦事處) into three people's communes (人民公社). Binjianglu Subdistrict Office, Jiefanglu Subdistrict Office and Xueyuanjie Subdistrict Office were united into Jiefang ("Liberation") People's Commune (解放人民公社). Guloujie Subdistrict Office became Xiling People's Commune (西陵人民公社). Jiefang People's Commune consisted of five subcommunes (分社): Hepingli (和平里), Jiefanglu ("Liberation Road") (解放路), Xueyuanjie ("School Street") (學院街), Shiweijiguan (市委機關), and Yunjilu (雲集路). Xiling People's Commune consisted of four subcommunes: Minzhu ("Democracy") (民主), Xiling (西陵), Sanxia ("Three Gorges") (三峽) and Xiba (西坝).

In 1967, Xiling People's Commune was renamed as Yichang City Dongfanghong ("The East is Red") People's Commune (宜昌市东方红人民公社).

In May 1968, the Yichang Area Revolutionary Committee (宜昌地区革命委员会) approved the creation of Yichang City Jiefang Commune Committee (宜昌市解放公社革命委员会) and Yichang City Dongfanghong Commune Committee (宜昌市东方红公社革命委员会).

In August 1980, the Yichang City Revolutionary Committee (宜昌市革命委员会) made Yichang City Dongfanghong People's Commune into Xiling Subdistrict and Yichang City Jiefang Renmin People's Commune into Yunji Subdistrict. Gezhouba Subdistrict and Yemingzhu Subdistrict came under the joint administration of Yichang and the Gezhouba Engineering Office (葛洲坝工程局).

In an act of the State Council of the People's Republic of China (国函〔1986〕188号: 关于宜昌市成立三个市辖区的请示) and the government of Hubei province (湖北省民政厅) (关于宜昌市设立三个市辖区调整方案的意见) taken on December 13, 1986 and carried out in the following year, Xiling District, Wujiagang District and Dianjun District were officially established as districts.

On April 3, 1987, Xiling District Preliminary Group (西陵区筹备组 was created. On June 2, 1987, the district's National People's Congress, Government, and Chinese People's Political Consultative Conference Preparation Groups (人大、政府、政协筹备小组) were created. On June 3, 1987, the Yichang City Xiling District Community Party Committee (中共宜昌市西陵区委员会 was created. On November 18, 1987, Xiling District held its first National People's Congress meeting (西陵区第一届人民代表大会第一次会议) and selected the first government for Xiling District.

As of 1996, Xiling District had an area of 89.8 km^{2}, a population of 344,000 and was made up of seven subdistricts, one township and one economic development zone including the now-disbanded Gulou Subdistrict (鼓楼街道).

As of the Fifth National Population Census of the People's Republic of China in 2000, Xiling District had a population of 427,299 and was made up of seven subdistricts, one township, one economic development zone and one scenic area.

As of the end of 2004, Xiling District was made up of six subdistricts (not including Gulou Subdistrict) and one township which were further divided into eighty-two residential communities and eleven villages.

As of the Sixth National Population Census of the People's Republic of China in 2010, Xiling District had a population of 512,074 and was made up of six subdistricts, one township, one economic development zone and one scenic area.

== Administrative divisions ==
The district administers 10 subdistricts:

Xiling Subdistrict (西陵街道), Xueyuan Subdistrict (学院街道), Yunji Subdistrict (云集街道), Xiba Subdistrict (西坝街道), Gezhouba Subdistrict (葛洲坝街道), Yemingzhu Subdistrict (夜明珠街道), Dongyuan Subdistrict (东苑街道), Nanyuan Subdistrict (南苑街道), Beiyuan Subdistrict (北苑街道) and Yaowan Subdistrict (窑湾街道)
