= Xiaoting, Yichang =

Xiaoting 猇亭区
- District
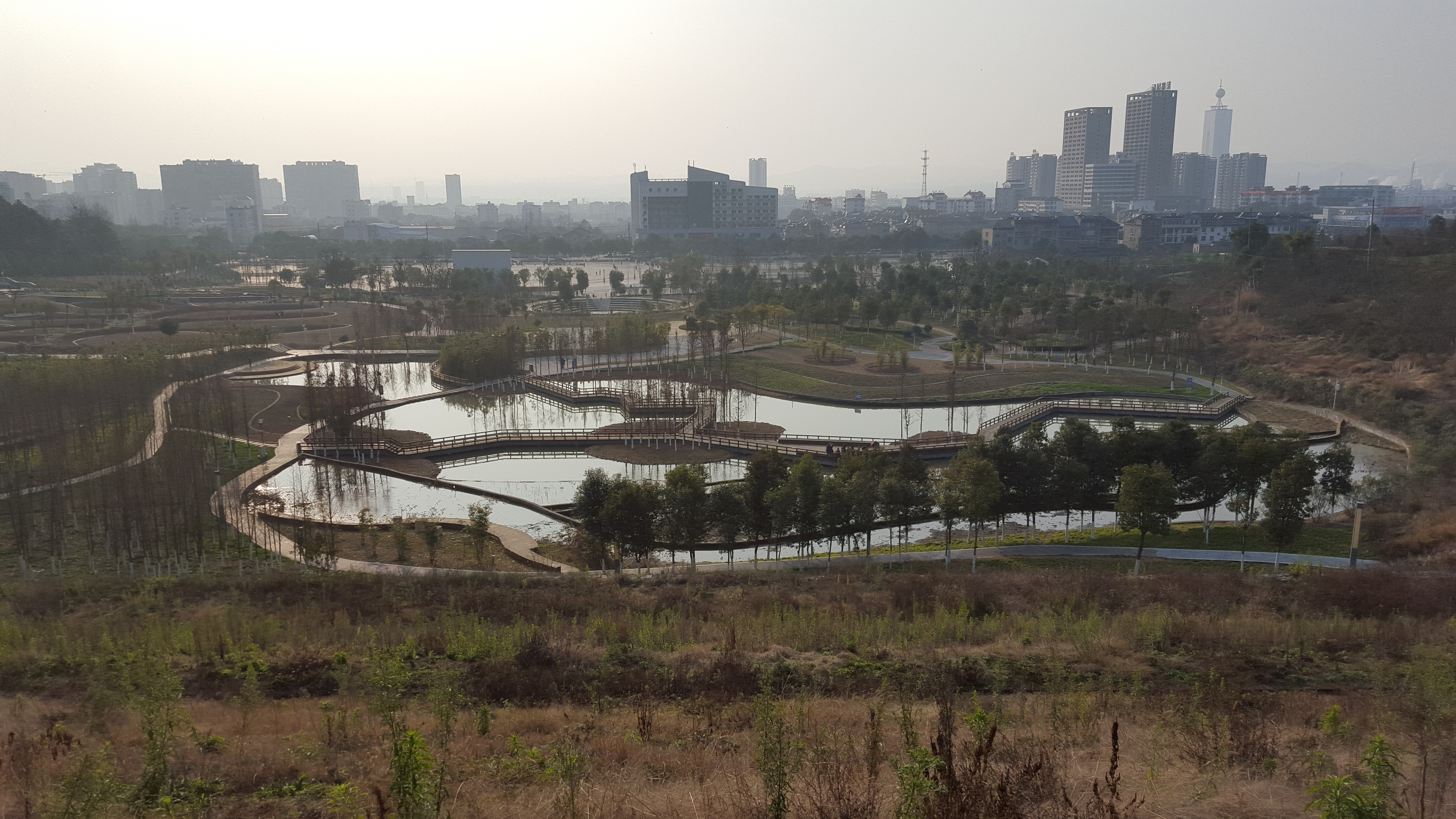
- Six Fountain Lake Park

- Location in Hubei
- Coordinates: 30°32′09″N 111°25′23″E
- Country: People's Republic of China
- Province: Hubei
- Prefecture-level city: Yichang

Area
  - Total: 118.52 km^{2} (45.76 sq mi)

Population (2020)
  - Total: 68,728
  - Density: 579.89/km^{2} (1,501.9/sq mi)
- Time zone: UTC+8 (China Standard)

Xiaoting (Chinese: 猇亭; pinyin: Xiāotíng) is a district of the city of Yichang, Hubei, People's Republic of China. In the A Dictionary of Current Chinese, Xiaoting is used as an example of usage of the rarely used character 猇 (xiāo).

== Administrative divisions ==
Three subdistricts:

- Gulaobei Subdistrict (古老背街道), Huya Subdistrict (虎牙街道), Yunchi Subdistrict (云池街道)

== See also ==
- Battle of Xiaoting
