= Yichang =

Yichang 宜昌市 Ichang
- Prefecture-level city
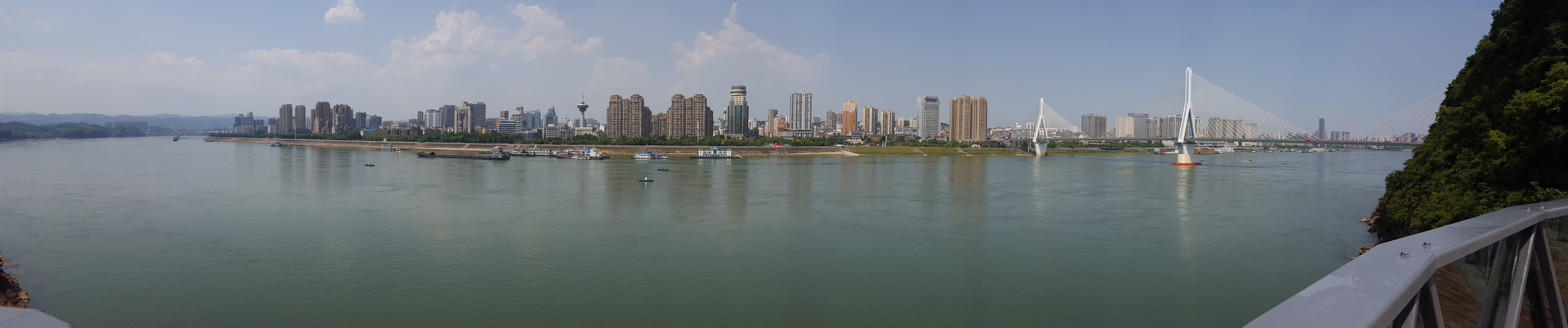
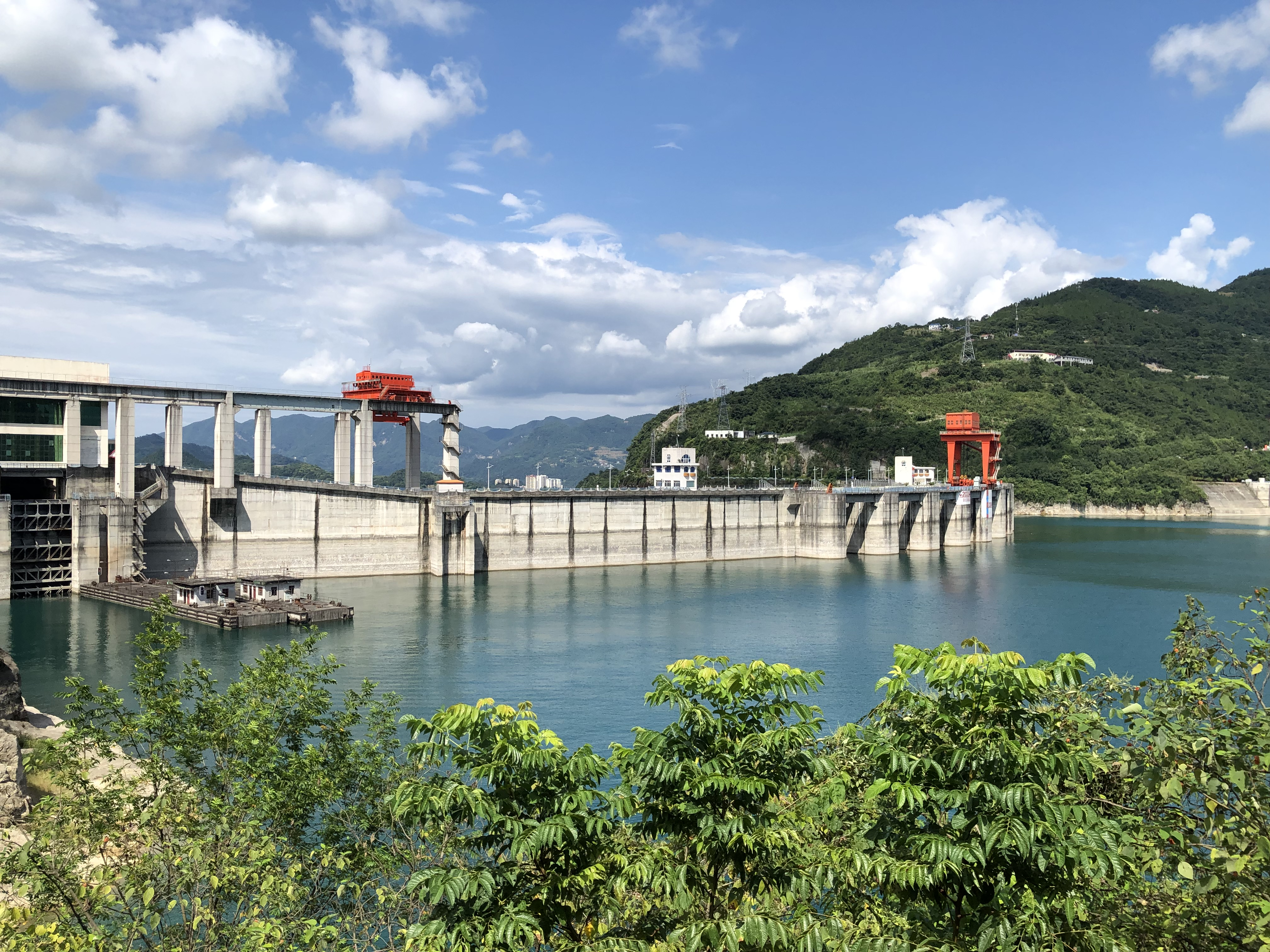
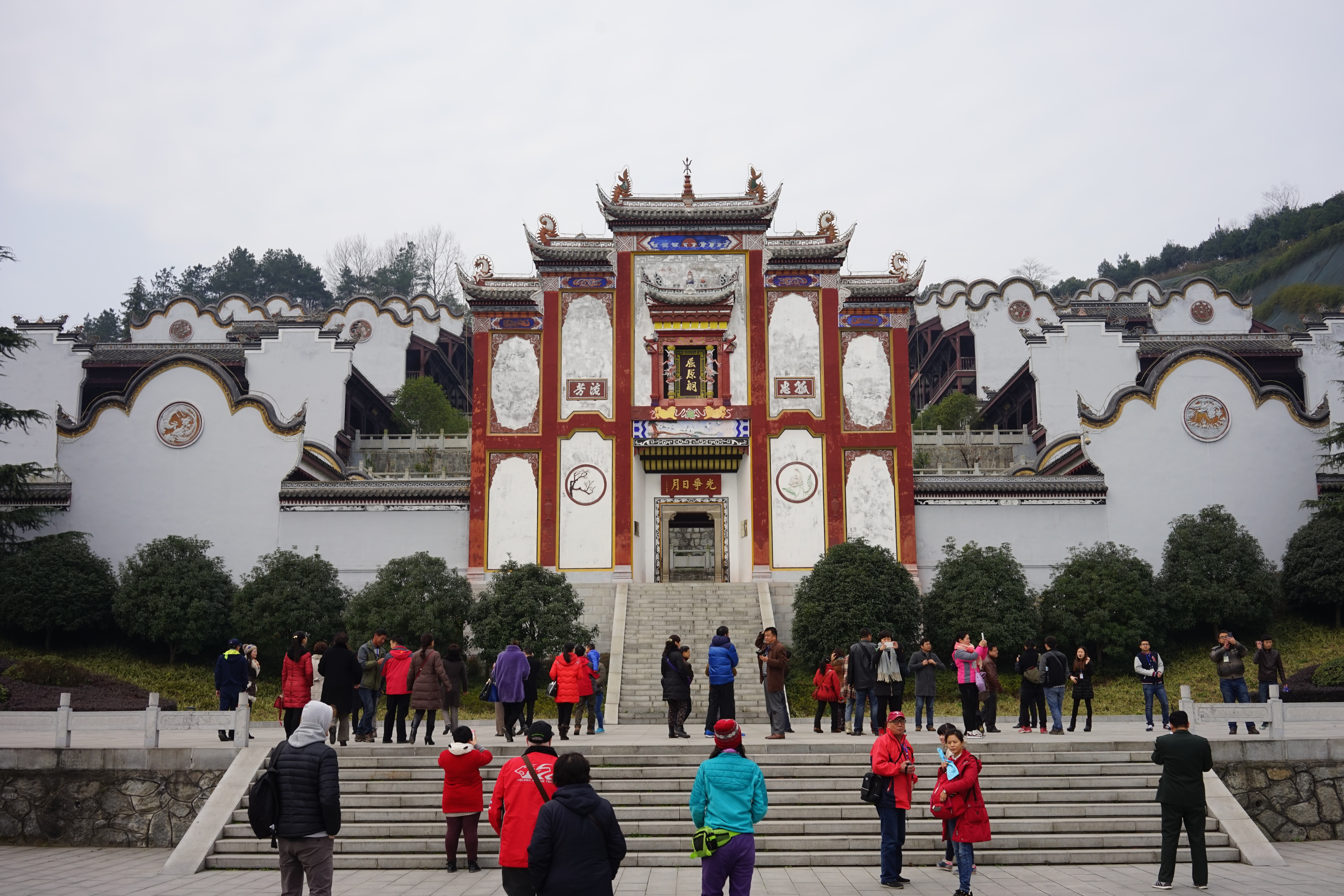
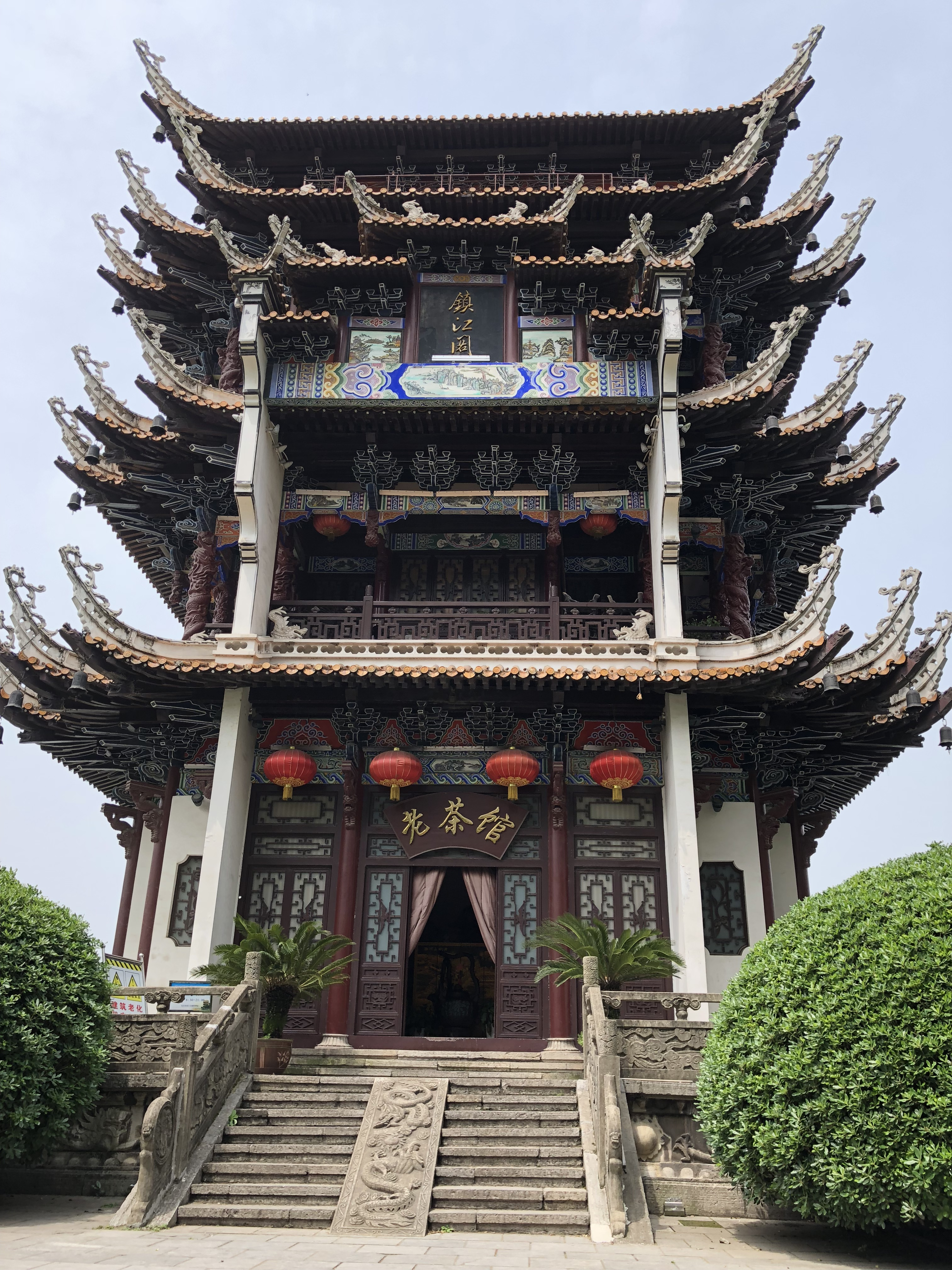
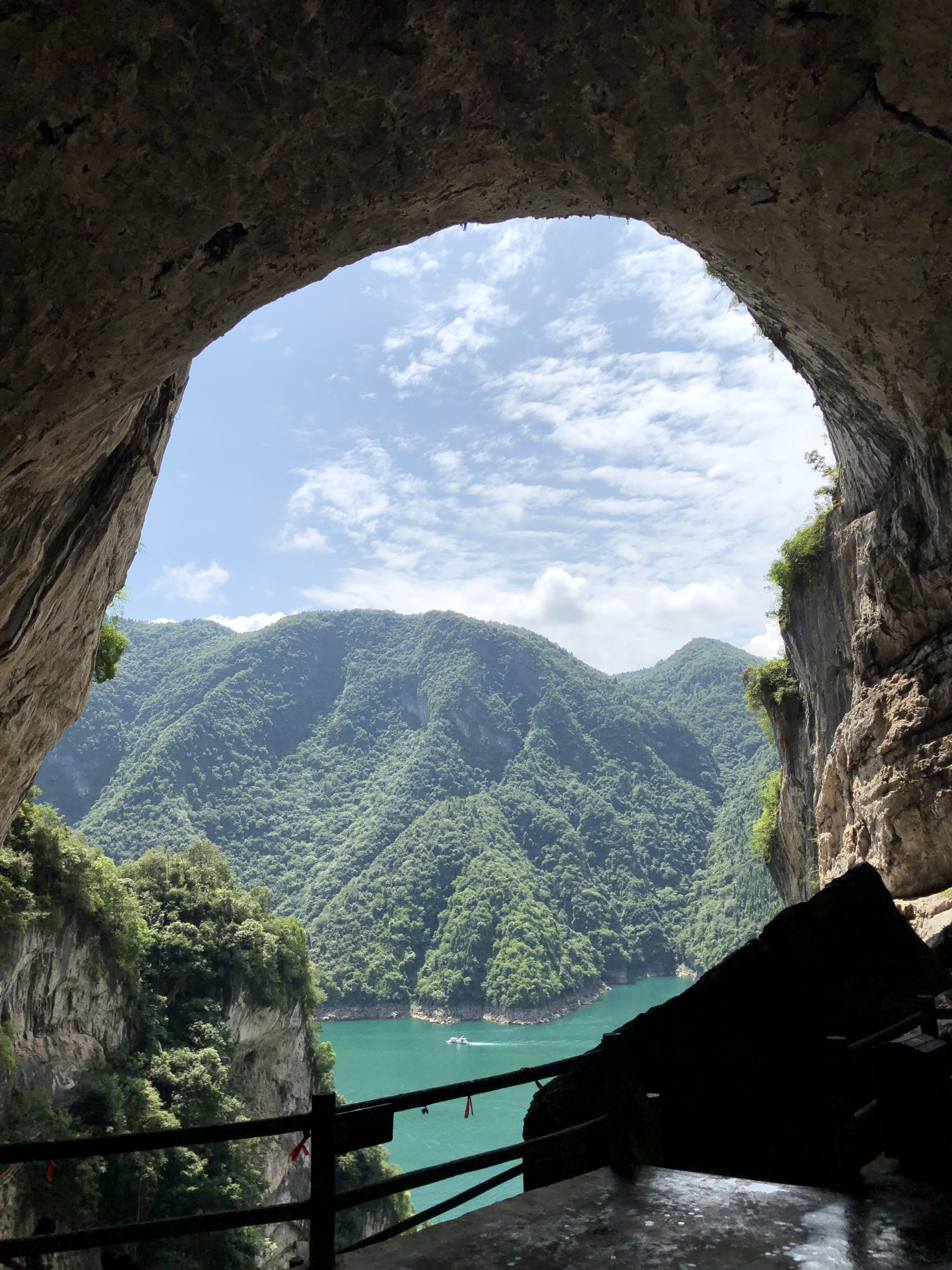
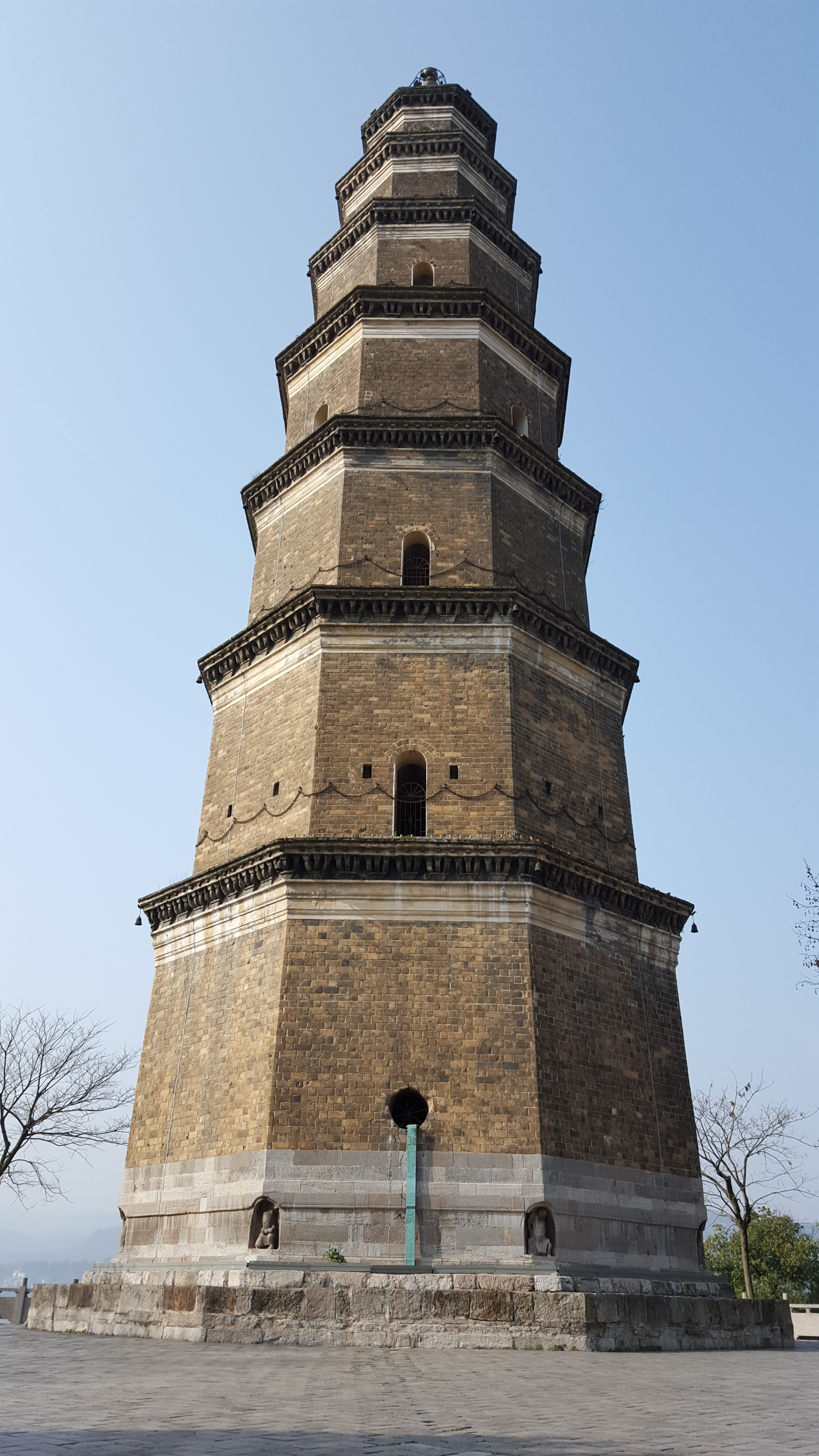
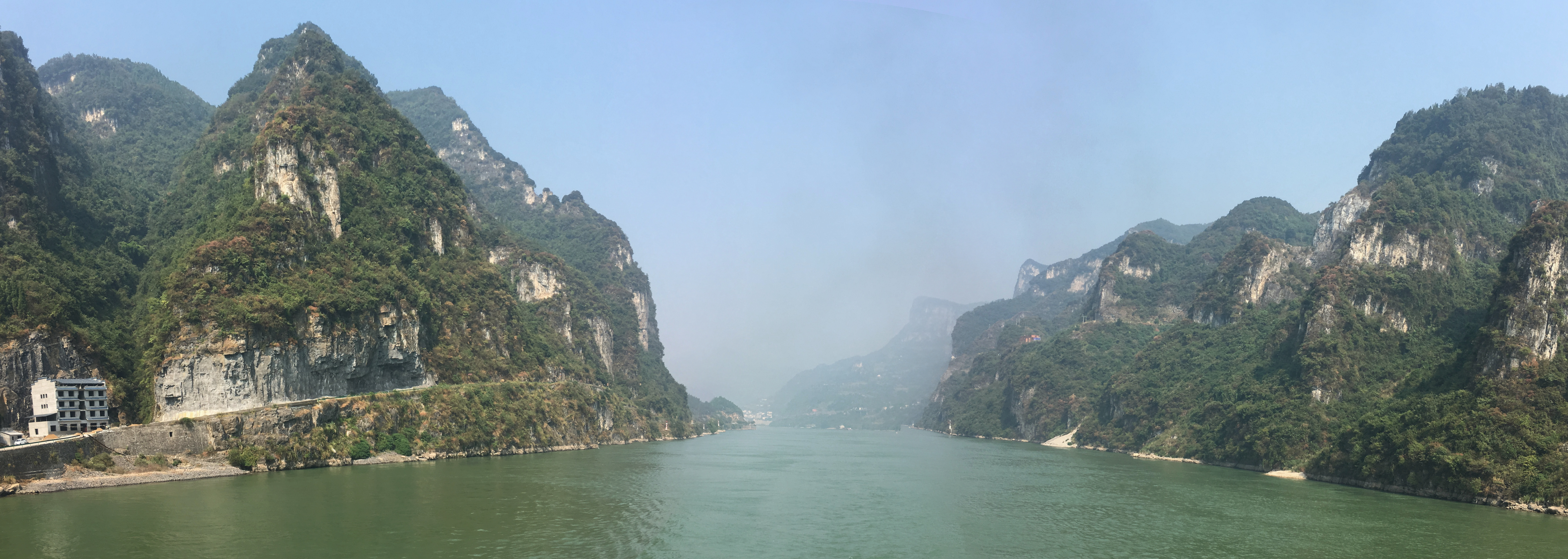
- Yichuan skyline Geheyan Dam Shrine of Qu Yuan Zhenjiang Pavilion Qingjiang Gallery Tianran Pagoda Xiling Gorge

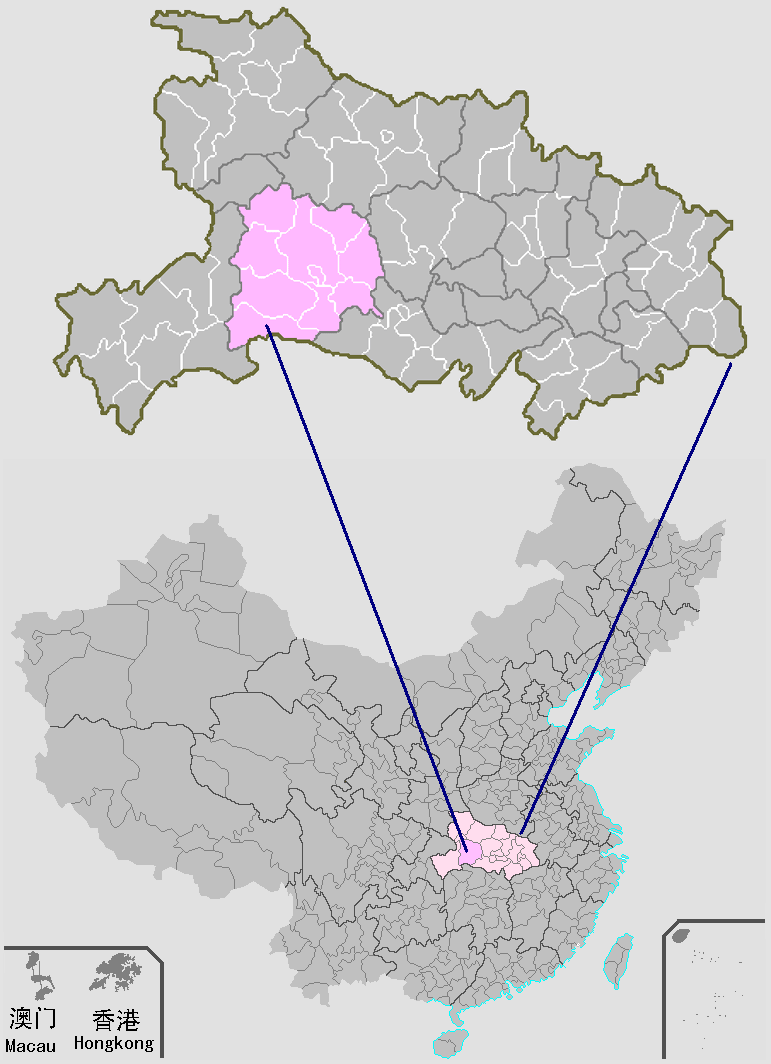
- Location of Yichang City jurisdiction in Hubei

- Location of the city in Hubei Location of the city in China
- Coordinates (Yichang municipal government): 30°41′31″N 111°17′13″E
- Country: People's Republic of China
- Province: Hubei
- Municipal seat: Xiling District

Government
  - CPC Party Secretary: Huang Chuping
  - Mayor: Chen Honghui; Acting

Area
  - Prefecture-level city: 21,338 km^{2} (8,239 sq mi)
  - Urban: 4,234.3 km^{2} (1,634.9 sq mi)
  - Metro: 4,192 km^{2} (1,619 sq mi)
- Elevation: 58 m (190 ft)
- Highest elevation: 2,427 m (7,963 ft)
- Lowest elevation: 35 m (115 ft)

Population (2024 census)
  - Prefecture-level city: 3,926,500
  - Density: 184.01/km^{2} (476.60/sq mi)
  - Urban: 2,562,000
  - Urban density: 605.1/km^{2} (1,567/sq mi)
  - Metro: 1,604,700
  - Metro density: 382.8/km^{2} (991.4/sq mi)

GDP
  - Prefecture-level city: CN¥ 338.2 billion US$ 54.3 billion
  - Per capita: CN¥ 82,360; US$ 22,140
- Time zone: UTC+8 (China Standard)
- Postal codes: 443000
- Area code: 0717
- ISO 3166 code: CN-HB-05
- Licence plate prefixes: 鄂E
- Website: en.yichang.gov.cn

Yichang
- "Yichang", as written in Chinese
- Chinese: 宜昌
- Postal: Ichang
Transcriptions
Standard Mandarin
- Hanyu Pinyin: Yíchāng
- Wade–Giles: I^{2}-ch'ang^{1}
- IPA: [ǐ.ʈʂʰáŋ]

Yichang (Chinese: 宜昌), alternatively romanized as Ichang, is a prefecture-level city located in western Hubei province, China. Yichang had a population of 3.92 million people at the 2022 census, making it the third most populous city in Hubei. The city is famous for the Three Gorges, the Three Gorges Dam and the Gezhouba Dam, all three of which are located in Yiling District, one of the city's districts.

== History ==
Yichang was historically known as Yiling. In 278 BC, during the Warring States period, the Qin general Bai Qi set fire to Yiling. In 222 AD, Yichang was also the site of the Battle of Yiling during the Three Kingdoms Period.

Yiling was renamed Yichang in 1735. Under the Qing Guangxu Emperor, Yichang was opened to foreign commerce as a trading port after the Qing and Great Britain agreed to the Chefoo Convention, which was signed by Sir Thomas Wade and Li Hongzhang in Chefoo on 21 August 1876. The imperial government set up a navigation company there and began building facilities. Since 1949, more than 50 wharves, with a total combined length of over 15 kilometers (9.3 mi), have been constructed at the port.

During the Second Sino-Japanese War, Yichang was a primary supply depot for the defending Chinese army. In October 1938, as the Japanese moved up the Yangtze River towards the strategic city of Chongqing, it became clear that Yichang needed to be evacuated. In 40 days, under the direction of businessman Lu Zuofu, more than 100,000 tons of equipment and 30,000 personnel were transported upstream by steamship or by porters pulling smaller vessels through the Three Gorges rapids to Chongqing.

In 1940, the Battle of Zaoyang-Yichang took place in the area.

== Administrative divisions ==
Administratively, it is a prefecture-level city; its municipal government has jurisdiction over five counties, five urban districts, and three satellite county-level cities (Yidu, Dangyang, Zhijiang).

=== Administrative map ===
The prefecture-level city of Yichang has direct jurisdiction over 14 divisions: 5 districts (区; qū), 3 county-level cities (县级市; xiànjí shì), 3 counties (县; xiàn), and 2 autonomous counties (自治县; zìzhì xiàn).

Map
Name	Hanzi	Hanyu Pinyin	Population (2010 census)	Area (/km^{2})	Density (/km^{2})
Districts
Xiling District	西陵区	Xīlíng Qū	512,074	68.14	7,515.03
Wujiagang District	伍家岗区	Wǔjiāgǎng Qū	214,194	84.03	2549.02
Dianjun District	点军区	Diǎnjūn Qū	103,696	533.23	194.47
Xiaoting District	猇亭区	Xiāotíng Qū	61,230	130.40	469.55
Yiling District	夷陵区	Yílíng Qū	520,186	3,416.57	152.25
County-level cities
Yidu	宜都市	Yídū Shì	384,598	1,354.83	283.87
Dangyang	当阳市	Dāngyáng Shì	468,293	2,148.82	217.93
Zhijiang	枝江市	Zhījiāng Shì	644,835	2,010.00	321
Counties
Yuan'an County	远安县	Yuǎn'ān Xiàn	184,532	1,741.06	105.99
Xingshan County	兴山县	Xīngshān Xiàn	231,536	480.20	73.69
Zigui County	秭归县	Zǐguī Xiàn	367,107	2,273.80	161.45
Autonomous counties
Changyang Tujia; Autonomous County	长阳土家族自治县	Chángyáng Tǔjiāzú; Zìzhìxiàn	388,228	3418.82	113.56
Wufeng Tujia; Autonomous County	五峰土家族自治县	Wǔfēng Tǔjiāzú; Zìzhìxiàn	188,923	2,370.41	79.70

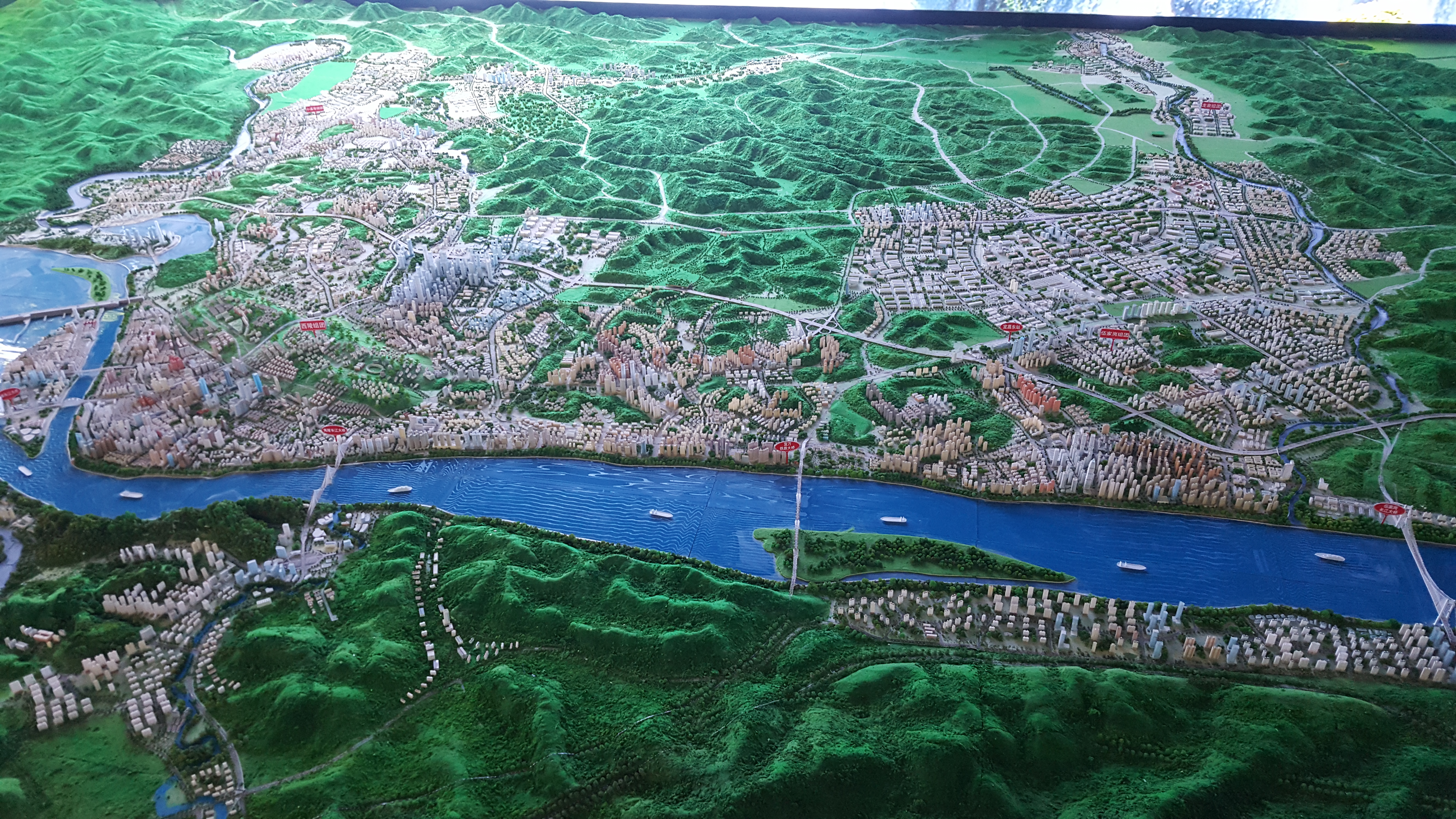
A sand table in Yichang Planning Exhibition Hall.

== Geography ==
Like most prefecture-level cities, Yichang includes both an urban area (which is labeled on less detailed maps as "Yichang") and the surrounding country area. It covers 21,084 square kilometers (8,141 sq mi) in Western Hubei Province, on both sides of the Yangtze River. The Xiling Gorge, the easternmost of the Three Gorges on the Yangtze, is located within the prefecture-level city.

Within the prefecture-level city of Yichang, the Yangtze is joined by a number of tributaries, including the Qing River (right), Xiang Xi and Huangbo Rivers (left).

The central urban area of Yichang is split between several districts. On the north bank of the Yangtze, there are Xiling District (the central part of the city), Yiling District, and Wujiagang District, and Xiaoting District. The urban area on the opposite (south) bank of the river is Dianjun District. All these districts, except the central Xiling District, also include a fair amount of suburban/rural area outside of the urban zone.

=== Climate ===
Yichang has a four-season, monsoon-influenced, humid subtropical climate (Köppen Cwa), with cool, damp and generally overcast winters, and hot, humid summers. The monthly 24-hour average temperature ranges from 5.0 °C (41.0 °F) in January to 27.7 °C (81.9 °F) in July, while the annual mean is 17.08 °C (62.7 °F). Close to 70% of the annual precipitation of 1,160 mm (46 in) occurs from May to September. With monthly percent possible sunshine ranging from 24% in January to 49% in August, the city receives 1,568 hours of bright sunshine annually, and summer is the sunniest season.

Climate data for Yichang, elevation 133 m (436 ft), (1991–2020 normals, extremes 1951–present)
Month	Jan	Feb	Mar	Apr	May	Jun	Jul	Aug	Sep	Oct	Nov	Dec	Year
Record high °C (°F)	22.5 (72.5)	28.2 (82.8)	34.1 (93.4)	36.7 (98.1)	38.7 (101.7)	39.9 (103.8)	40.7 (105.3)	41.4 (106.5)	39.2 (102.6)	37.7 (99.9)	29.8 (85.6)	24.6 (76.3)	41.4 (106.5)
Mean daily maximum °C (°F)	8.8 (47.8)	11.8 (53.2)	16.6 (61.9)	23.0 (73.4)	27.3 (81.1)	30.5 (86.9)	32.7 (90.9)	32.1 (89.8)	28.2 (82.8)	23.0 (73.4)	17.2 (63.0)	11.2 (52.2)	21.9 (71.4)
Daily mean °C (°F)	5.0 (41.0)	7.6 (45.7)	11.7 (53.1)	17.7 (63.9)	22.2 (72.0)	25.8 (78.4)	28.1 (82.6)	27.4 (81.3)	23.6 (74.5)	18.3 (64.9)	12.7 (54.9)	7.3 (45.1)	17.3 (63.1)
Mean daily minimum °C (°F)	2.2 (36.0)	4.6 (40.3)	8.1 (46.6)	13.6 (56.5)	18.2 (64.8)	22.1 (71.8)	24.5 (76.1)	23.9 (75.0)	20.1 (68.2)	14.9 (58.8)	9.5 (49.1)	4.4 (39.9)	13.8 (56.9)
Record low °C (°F)	−9.8 (14.4)	−4.4 (24.1)	−1.3 (29.7)	0.4 (32.7)	8.8 (47.8)	14.7 (58.5)	18.4 (65.1)	17.2 (63.0)	11.4 (52.5)	3.7 (38.7)	−0.9 (30.4)	−5.4 (22.3)	−9.8 (14.4)
Average precipitation mm (inches)	24.4 (0.96)	38.7 (1.52)	54.8 (2.16)	92.3 (3.63)	139.4 (5.49)	141.8 (5.58)	211.0 (8.31)	191.3 (7.53)	107.2 (4.22)	73.8 (2.91)	46.7 (1.84)	18.7 (0.74)	1,140.1 (44.89)
Average precipitation days (≥ 0.1 mm)	7.7	9.2	11.0	12.5	13.3	12.6	14.7	13.7	10.5	10.4	8.3	7.7	131.6
Average snowy days	4.3	3.0	1.1	0	0	0	0	0	0	0	0.2	1.4	10
Average relative humidity (%)	74	73	72	73	73	76	79	78	75	75	75	73	75
Mean monthly sunshine hours	65.9	71.9	103.1	125.8	132.8	134.1	157.2	168.4	126.8	118.6	103.8	81.1	1,389.5
Percentage possible sunshine	20	23	28	32	31	32	37	41	35	34	33	26	31
Source: China Meteorological AdministrationNOAA all-time extreme temperature

== Transport ==
=== Air ===
Yichang Sanxia International Airport is located in the Xiaoting District of Yichang City, which is 26 km (16 mi) away from the city center and 55 km (34 mi) from the Three Gorges Dam site. The airport is conveniently located, which borders Yihuang Highway in the north, Long River Golden Waterway in the south and Jiaozhi Railway in the east.

=== Roads and bridges ===
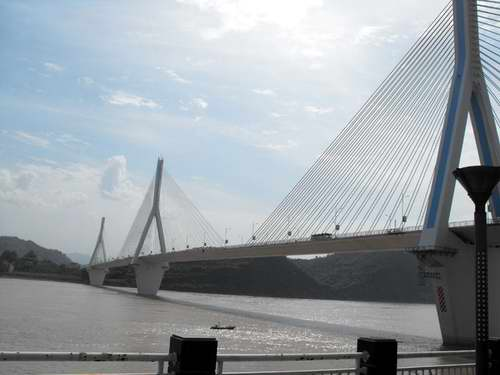
Yiling Bridge

- China National Highway 318 runs east–west through most of the prefecture-level city, south of the center city
- China National Highway 209 passes through the northwestern corner of the prefecture-level city (Xingshan County)

Several provincial highways connect Yichang center city with most counties.

Several bridges span the Yangtze River within the prefecture-level city of Yichang, including (upstream to downstream):

- Xiling Bridge, connecting Letianxi and Sandouping in Yiling District, a few km downstream from the Three Gorges Dam.
- Yiling Bridge, downtown Yichang (a few km downstream from the Gezhouba Dam). It connects the urban Xiling and Dianjun Districts.
- Yichang Yangtze Highway Bridge, on the Hu-Rong Expressway, downstream of Yichang center city
- Yiwan Bridge: A Railway Bridge for Yiwan Railway which connects Yichang to Chongqing by high speed trains, almost 5 km (3.1 mi) downstream from the Yiling Bridge.

There are several ferry crossings as well.

=== Waterways ===
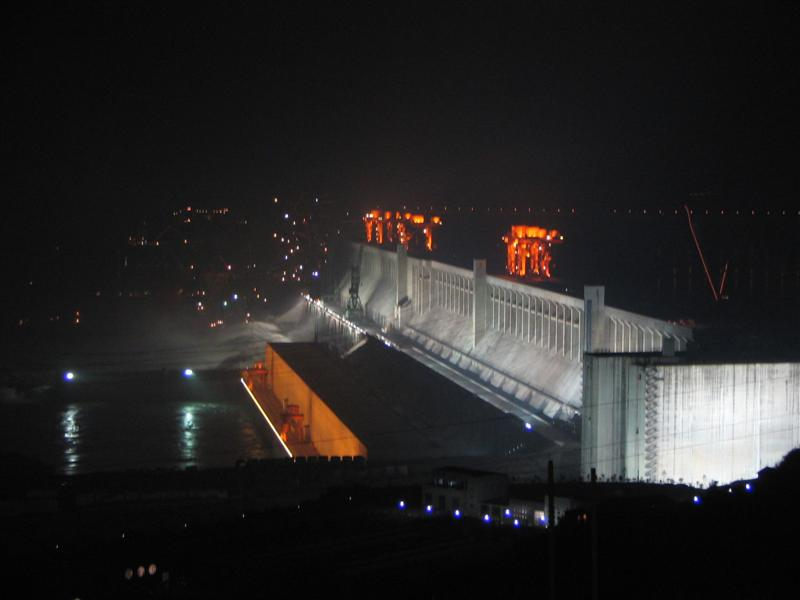
The Three Gorges Dam is located near Sandouping and Maoping within Yichang prefecture-level city (some 40 km (25 mi) from Yichang central city)

Yichang has long been a major transit port and distribution center of goods, and serves as the economic hub of western Hubei province and an intermediary between the major cities of Chongqing and Wuhan. Its primary industries are shipping and shipbuilding, taking advantage of its location on the Yangtze River. The Qing River in the southern part of the prefectures, with its cascade of dams, is an important waterway. Maoping Town (the county seat of Zigui County), has an active passenger wharf as well.

=== Railway ===
Yichang is served by several railway lines.

Yichang Railway Station, located in downtown Yichang, opened in 1971, was the city's first railway station. In 2012 it closed for a renovation project.

The Yichang East Railway Station, opened in the late 2010 in the eastern suburbs of Yichang, is presently the city's main train station. It is the junction point of two segments of the Shanghai-Wuhan-Chengdu Passenger Dedicated Line, one of China's new east–west rail mainlines. To the east, the Hanyi Railway (opened June 29, 2012) provides frequent service to Wuhan, with some trains continuing to Nanjing and Shanghai. To the west, the Yiwan Railway (Yichang-Wanzhou; opened December 2010) serves as the gateway to Hubei's southwestern panhandle (Enshi), with some service continuing to Chongqing and Chengdu.

Yichang North railway station opened in 2025 and is served by the Wuhan–Yichang high-speed railway of the Shanghai–Chongqing–Chengdu HSR corridor and the Yichang–Xingshan HSR. It will serve as the eastern end of the Chongqing–Yichang HSR, currently under construction and due to open in 2029.

The Jiaozuo–Liuzhou Railway, a north–south line, crosses the eastern part of the prefecture-level city. It crosses the Yangtze at Zhicheng in Yidu County-level City.

== Demographics ==
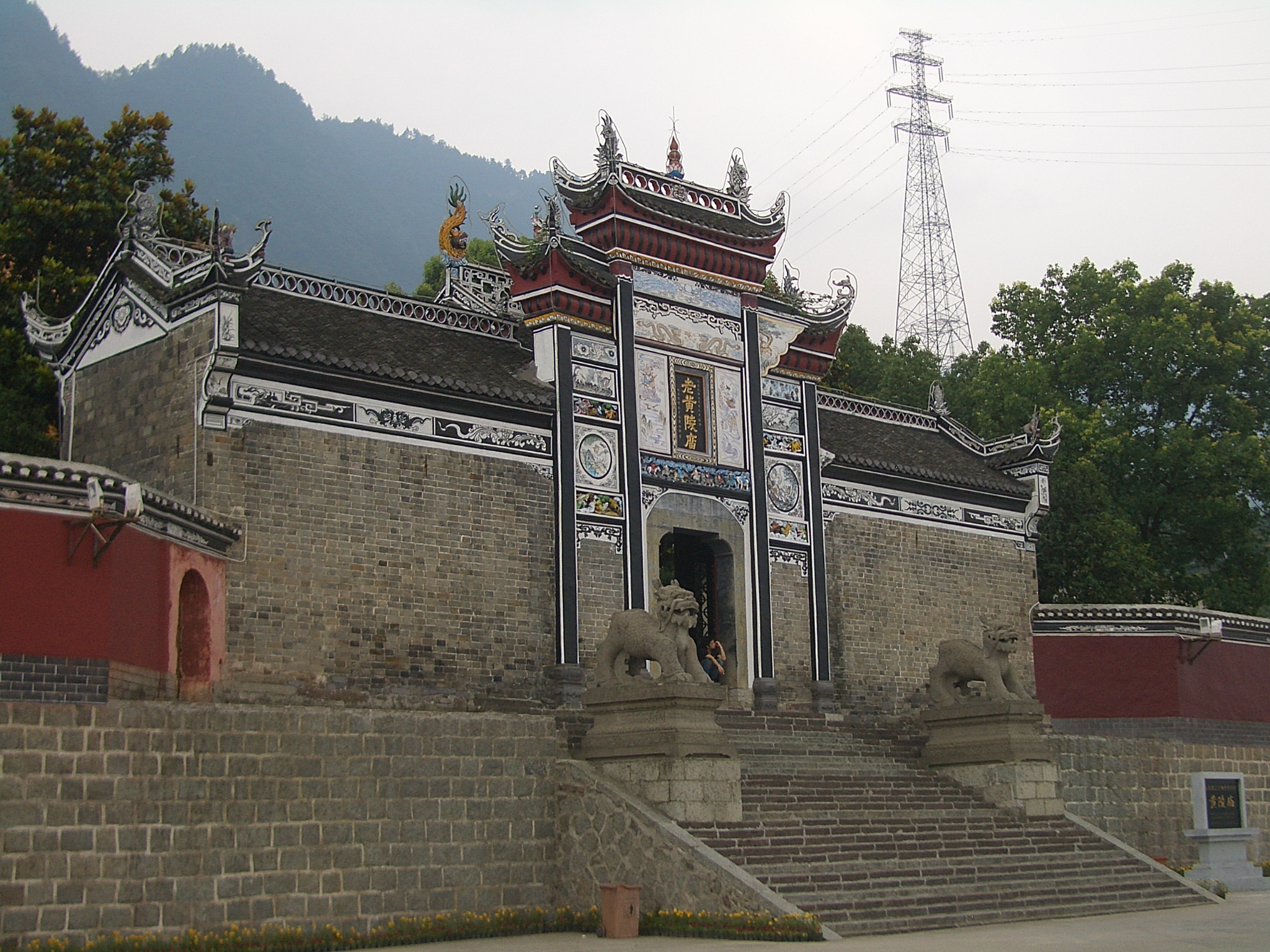
Huangling Temple, Sandouping

As of the 2020 census, its population was 4,017,607 inhabitants of whom 1,536,012 lived in the built-up (or metro) area consisting of Yiling, Xiling, Wujiagang and Dianjun urban districts. The Xiaoting District has not yet been urbanized. Yichang prefecture-level city, is home to many members of the Tujia ethnic group, who mostly live in several counties in the south-west of the prefecture.

Yichang also formed the border between the cultures of Ba in the west (an ancient state in the eastern part of what is now Sichuan Province) and the Chu State in the east (an ancient state in what is now Hubei Province and northern Hunan Province).

== Education ==
Since 2002, Yichang City has been home of the China Three Gorges University (the result of the merger of the University of Hydraulic & Electric Engineering, Yichang and of Hubei Sanxia University), the largest comprehensive university in Hubei Province outside Wuhan, with over 20,400 full-time students.

- China Three Gorges University
- Three Gorges Vocational College of Electric Power

There are 170 secondary schools in Yichang enrolling 150,700 students. 53,900 of the citizens in Yichang hold a secondary school degree. There are 282 elementary schools being located in Yichang enrolling 156,900. 27,600 of the citizens hold secondary school degrees. 383 kindergartens located in Yichang with 78,500 children.

== Economy ==
Yichang has developed rapidly in recent years. In 2023, Yichang's GDP reached 575.635 billion yuan, with a per capita GDP of 146,800 yuan. In 2023, the primary, secondary, and tertiary sectors in Yichang increased by 60.856 billion yuan, 228.034 billion yuan, and 286.745 billion yuan, respectively. The main industries in Yichang include agriculture, fisheries, chemical manufacturing, food biomedicine, and tourism. Additionally, Yichang possesses abundant mineral resources including phosphorus, iron, coal, manganese, vanadium, gold, copper, lead, zinc, silicon, gypsum, graphite, quartz sand, limestone, marble, and barite. Its main agricultural resources are citrus, tea, and aquatic products. Hydropower is the most important and renowned resource, as the world's largest hydroelectric power station, Three Gorges Dam, generates 111.80 billion kWh per year.

=== Agriculture ===
Located at the transition zone from the western Hubei mountains to the Jianghan Plains, Yichang's geography features a mild climate, distinct seasons, and abundant rainfall. The main agricultural products in the Yichang region are citrus and tea because of the geography and climate. Due to the increase in urbanization levels and average income levels, along with a more developed supply chain and export market, there has been an expansion of the customer base for these products. Consequently, demand for high-value products such as premium citrus and tea is rapidly growing. In addition, Southeast Asia, the United States, and the Middle East are the main overseas markets of Yichang's citrus. In 2022, citrus was sold for 6,700 yuan ($960) per ton for exports. The total output of tea in Yichang was 119,200 tons in 2023, and the agricultural production value reached 5.984 billion yuan. From 2000 to 2022, the annual growth rate of citrus fruit production was 10.2%, and for tea was 12.8%.

=== Tourism ===
Yichang has rich tourism resources, which attract millions of visitors for its natural scenery located among mountains and rivers. In 2023, Yichang welcomed about 79 million visitors. The most famous attractions include the Three Gorges Dam Tourist Area, Tribe of the Three Gorges, Qingjiang Gallery, Memorial Temple of Qu Yuan, Three Gorges Grand Waterfalls, and Xiling Gorge. The overall revenue from tourism was 110 billion yuan in 2023, which increased 44.5% from last year.

As the gateway to the Three Gorges Dam, Yichang is a major tourism hub. The Yichang Museum houses important cultural relics, including the Zigui Bell.

=== Hydropower ===
Yichang's prefectures have many major hydroelectricity projects. The best known are the two huge dams on the Yangtze River: the Gezhouba Dam (located just upstream of Yichang central city) and Three Gorges Dam, which is 40 kilometers (25 mi) upstream. The Geheyan Dam and Gaobazhou Dam on the Qing River are important as well. Besides those, a huge number of medium-sized and small power plants operate on smaller rivers and streams within some prefectures.

These projects not only provide a stable and substantial source of renewable energy, but also play a crucial role in flood control, navigation improvement, and irrigation support for the surrounding regions. The Three Gorges Dam, in particular, is one of the largest hydroelectric power stations in the world and serves as a symbol of China's engineering achievements. At the same time, the construction of large dams has brought about challenges such as ecological changes, relocation of local communities, and preservation of cultural heritage sites, making hydropower development in Yichang both a driver of modernization and a subject of ongoing debate.

== Picture gallery ==
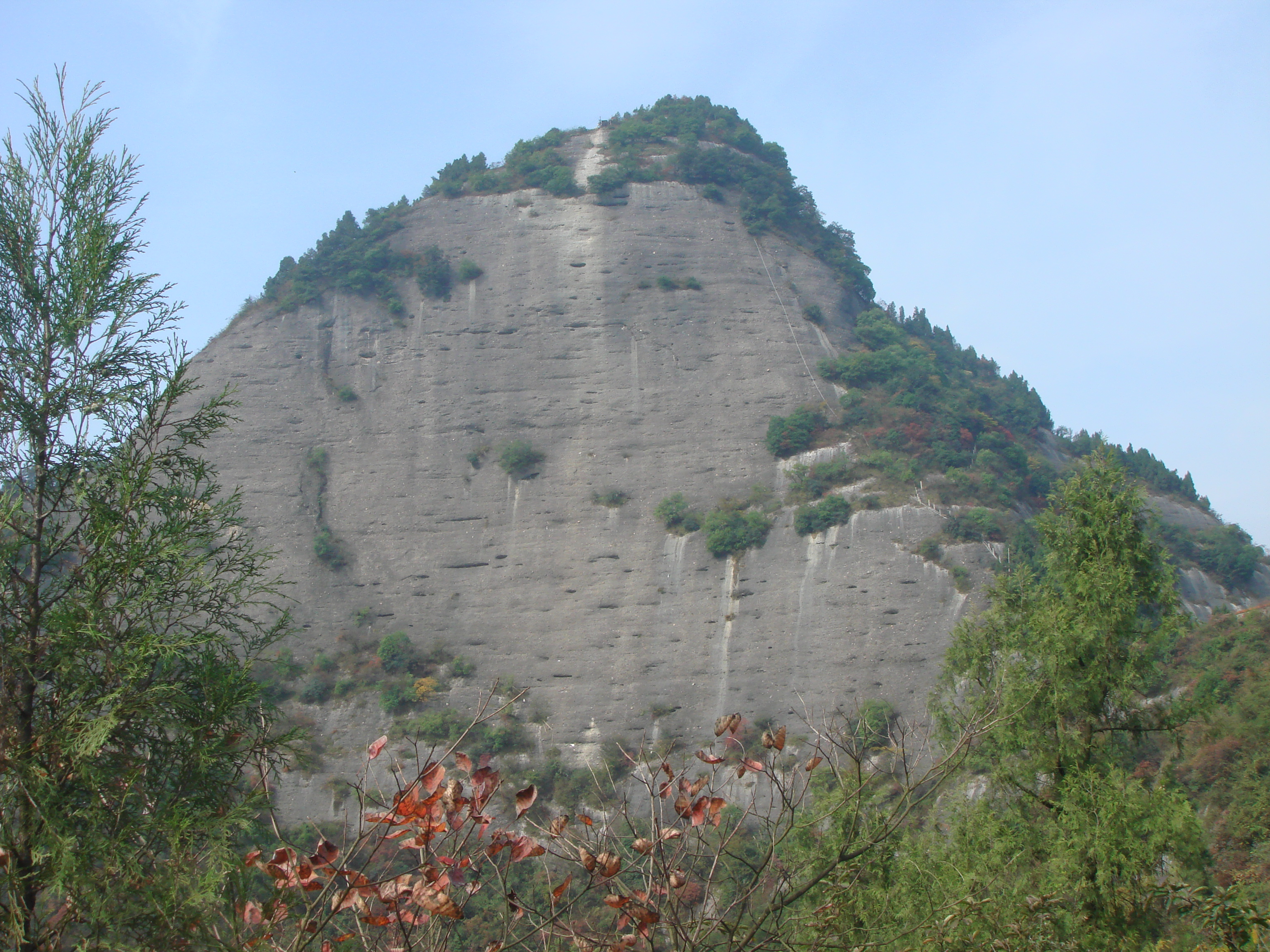
Wenfo mountain

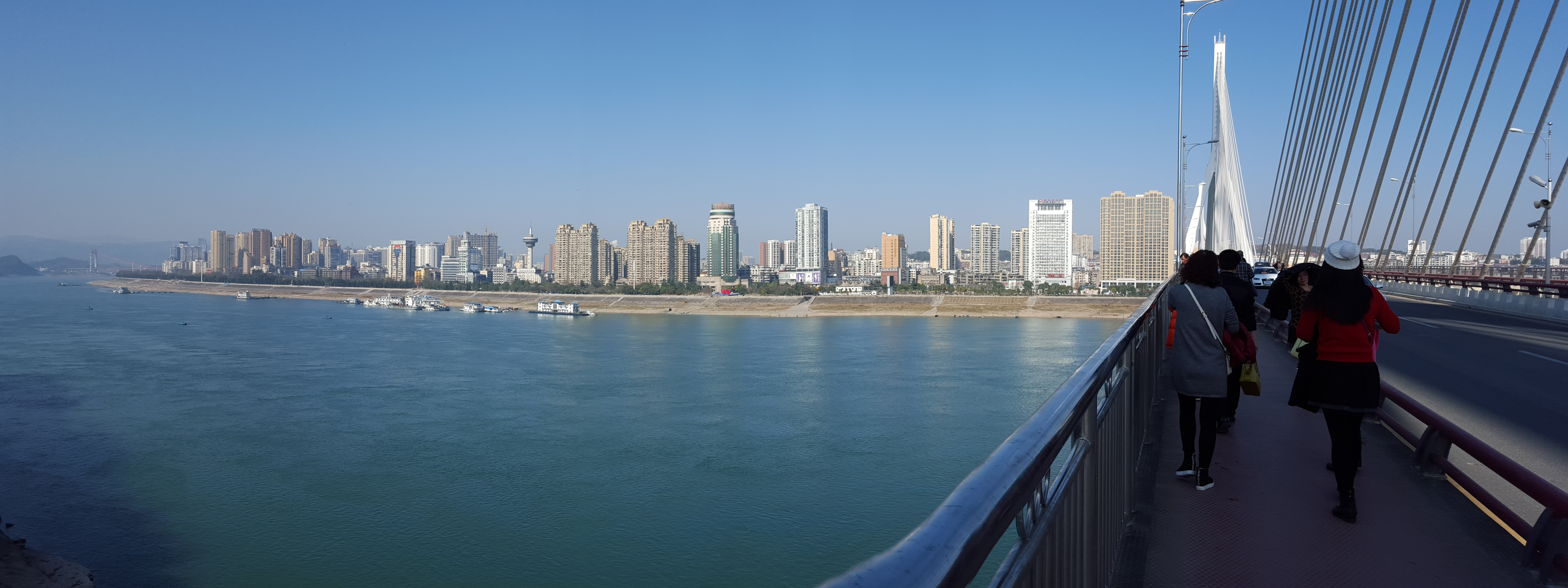
Yangtze River

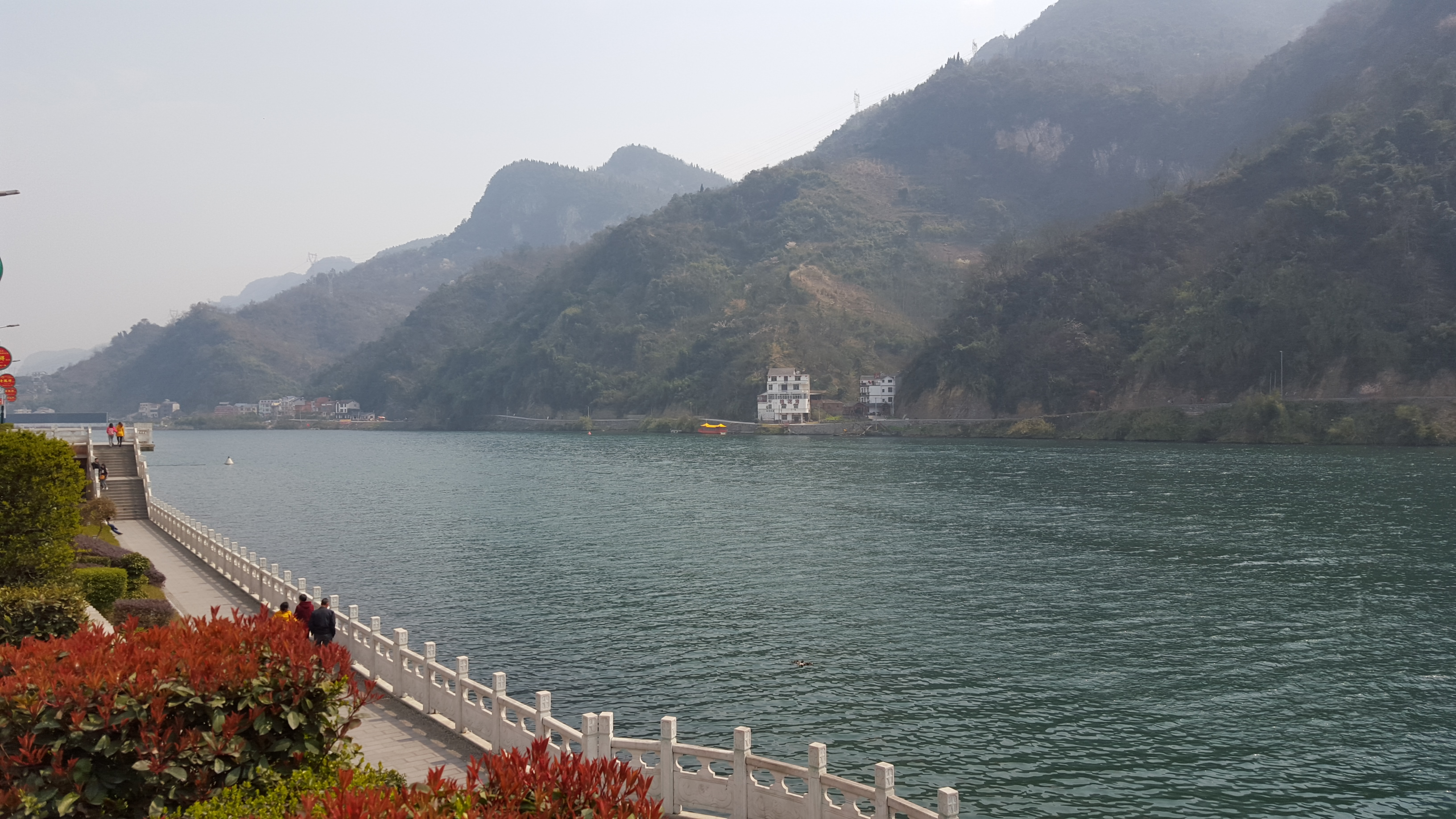
Qing River

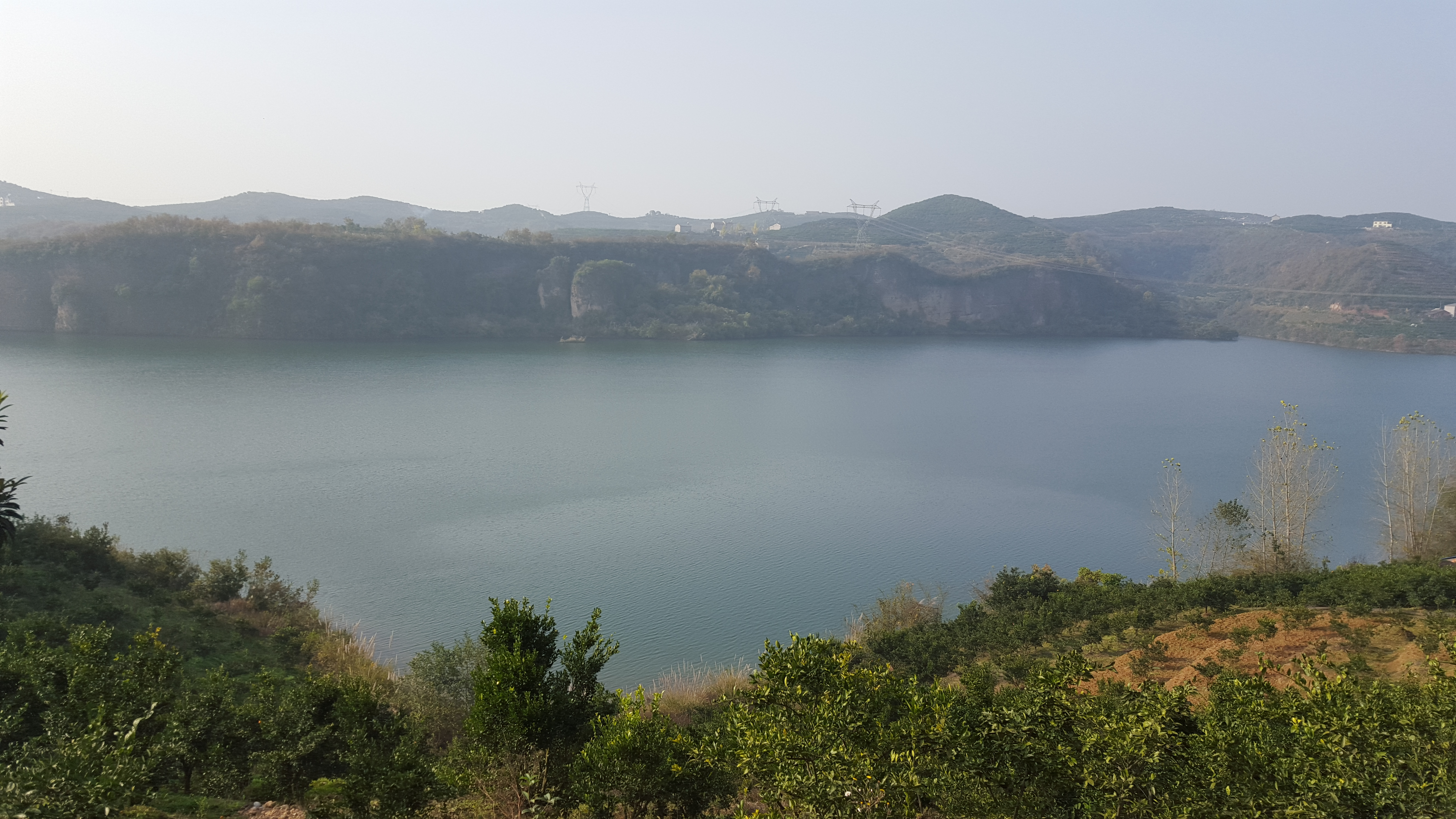
Guanzhuang Reservoir

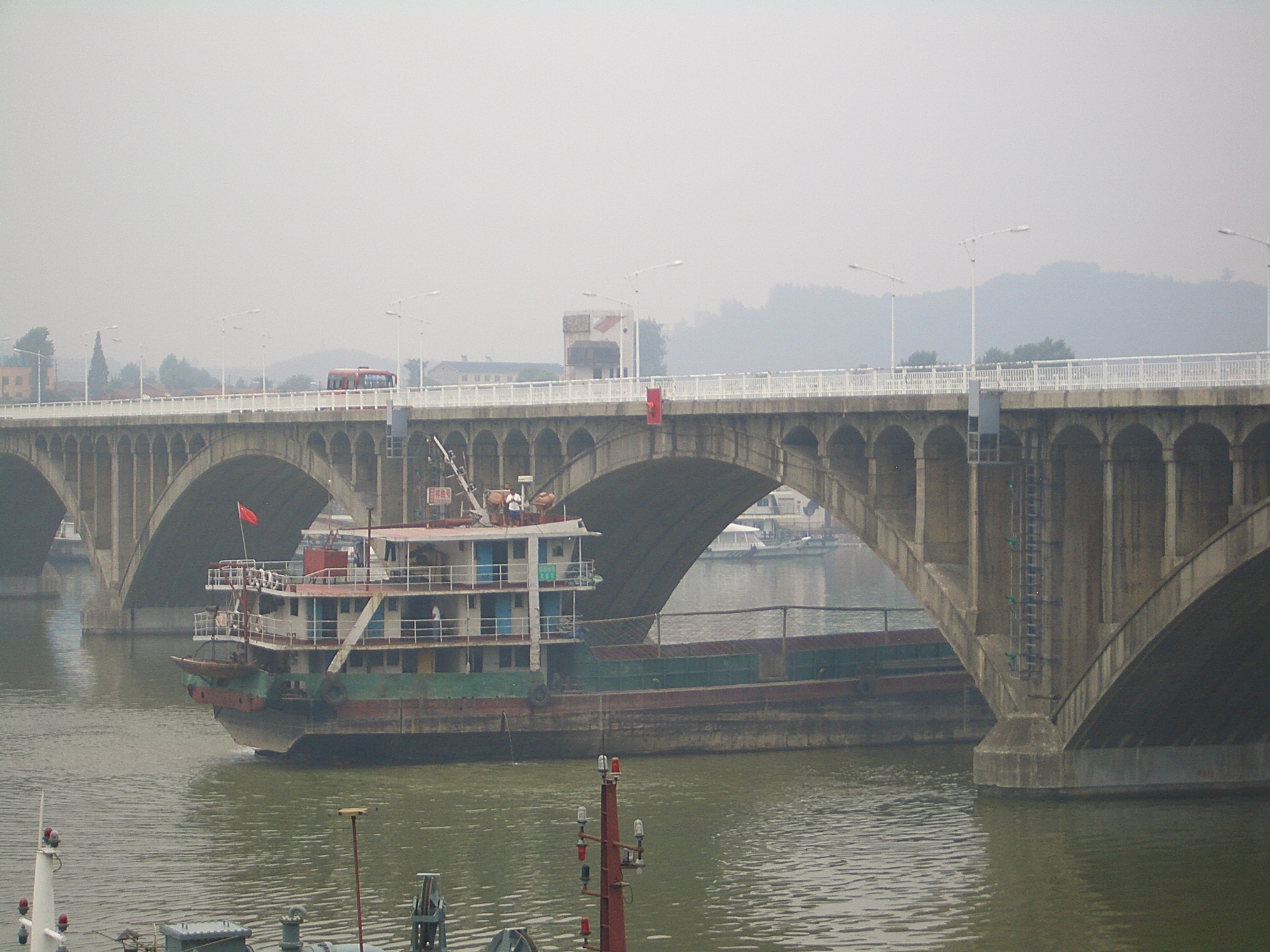
Huangbo River

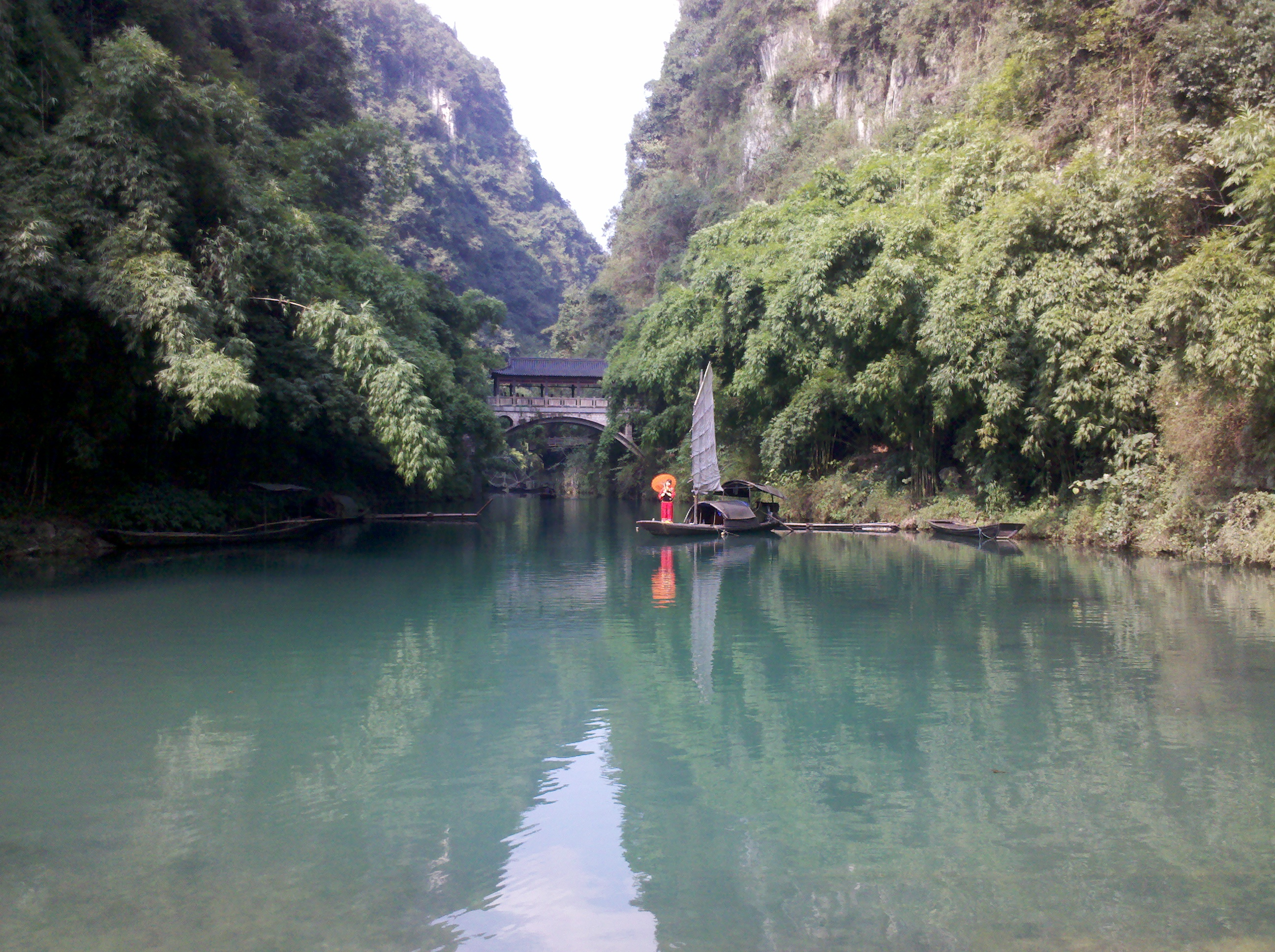
Tribe of Three Gorges

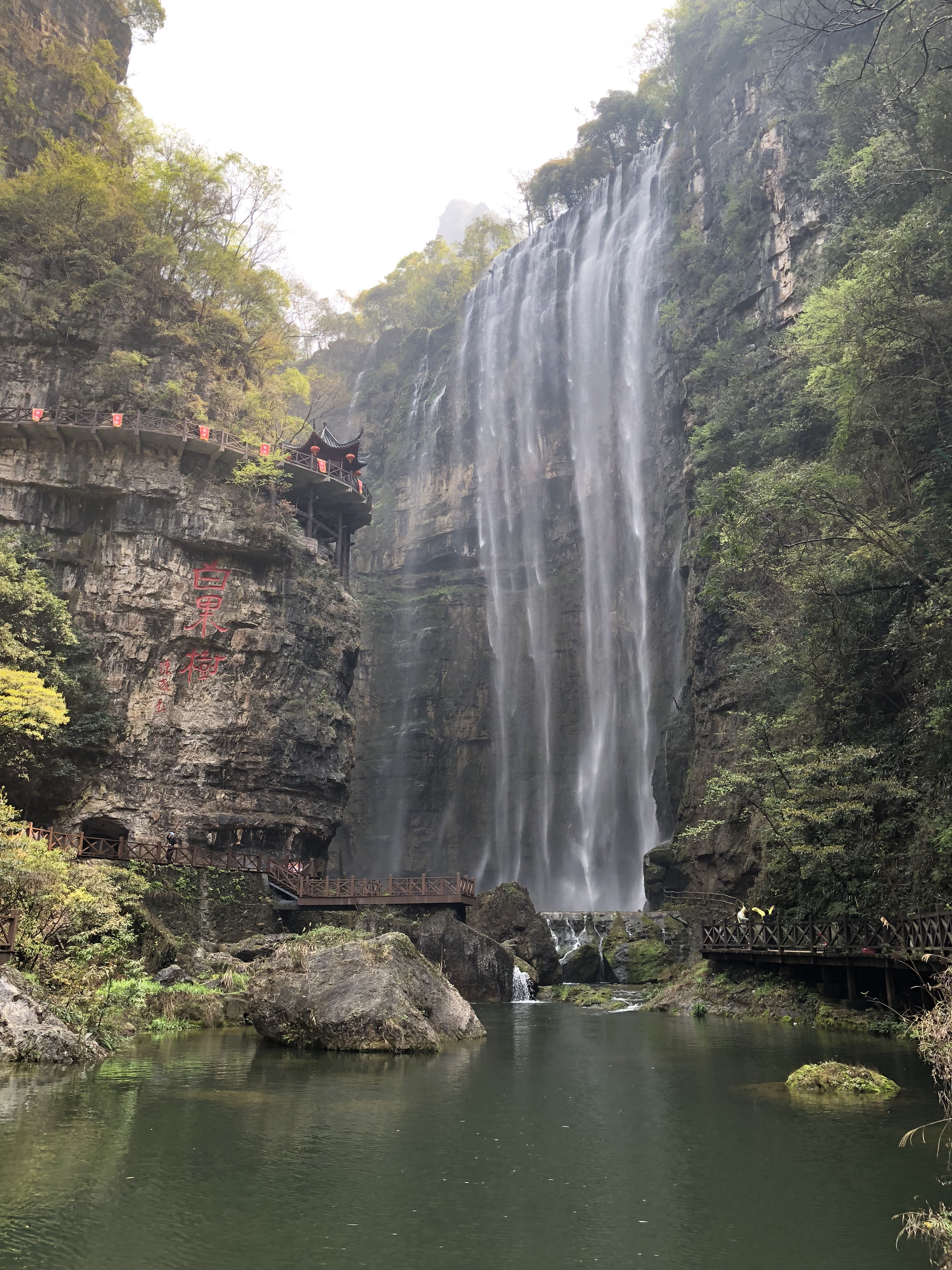
Three Gorges Waterfall

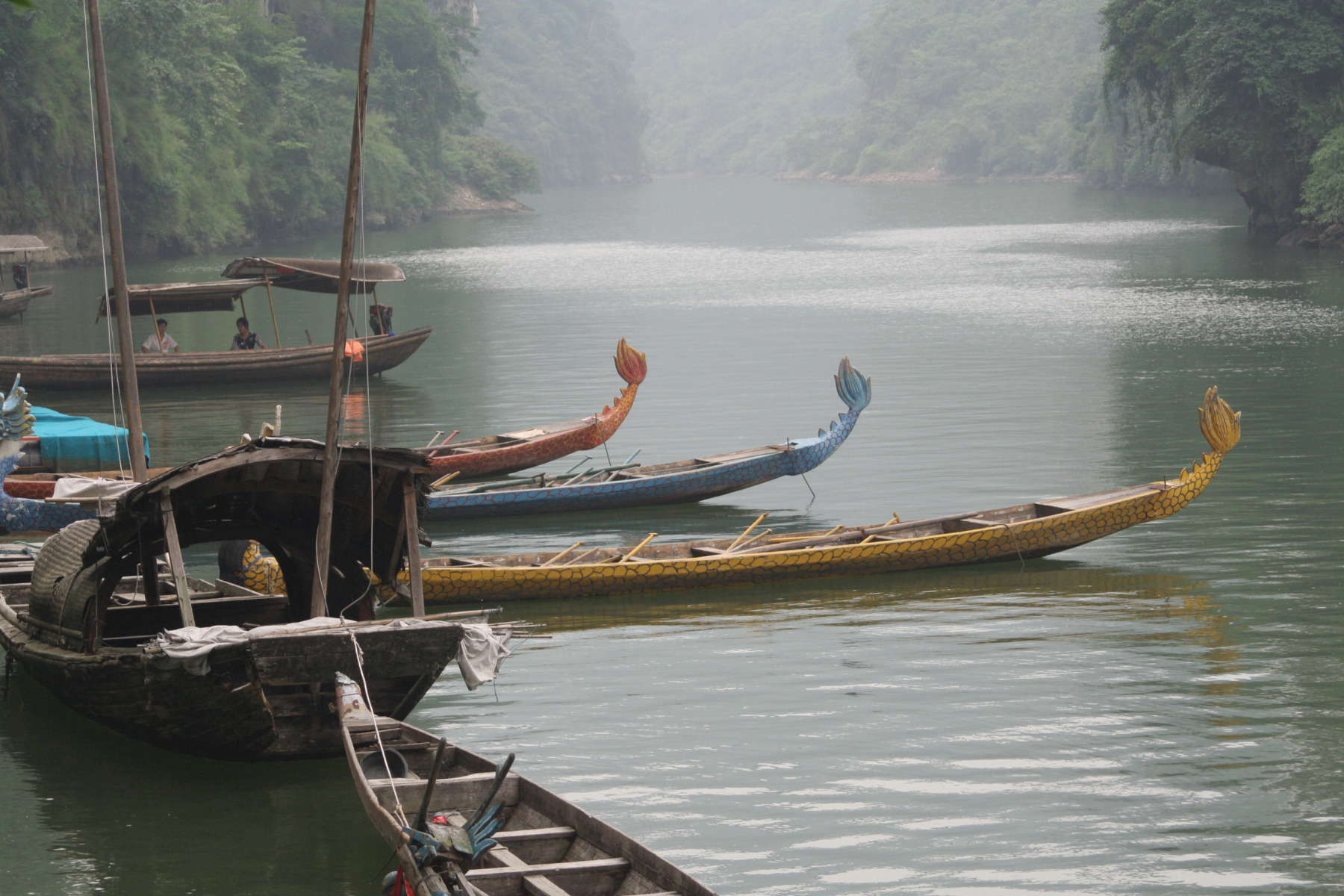
Boats on the Yangtze River, upstream from the Three Gorges

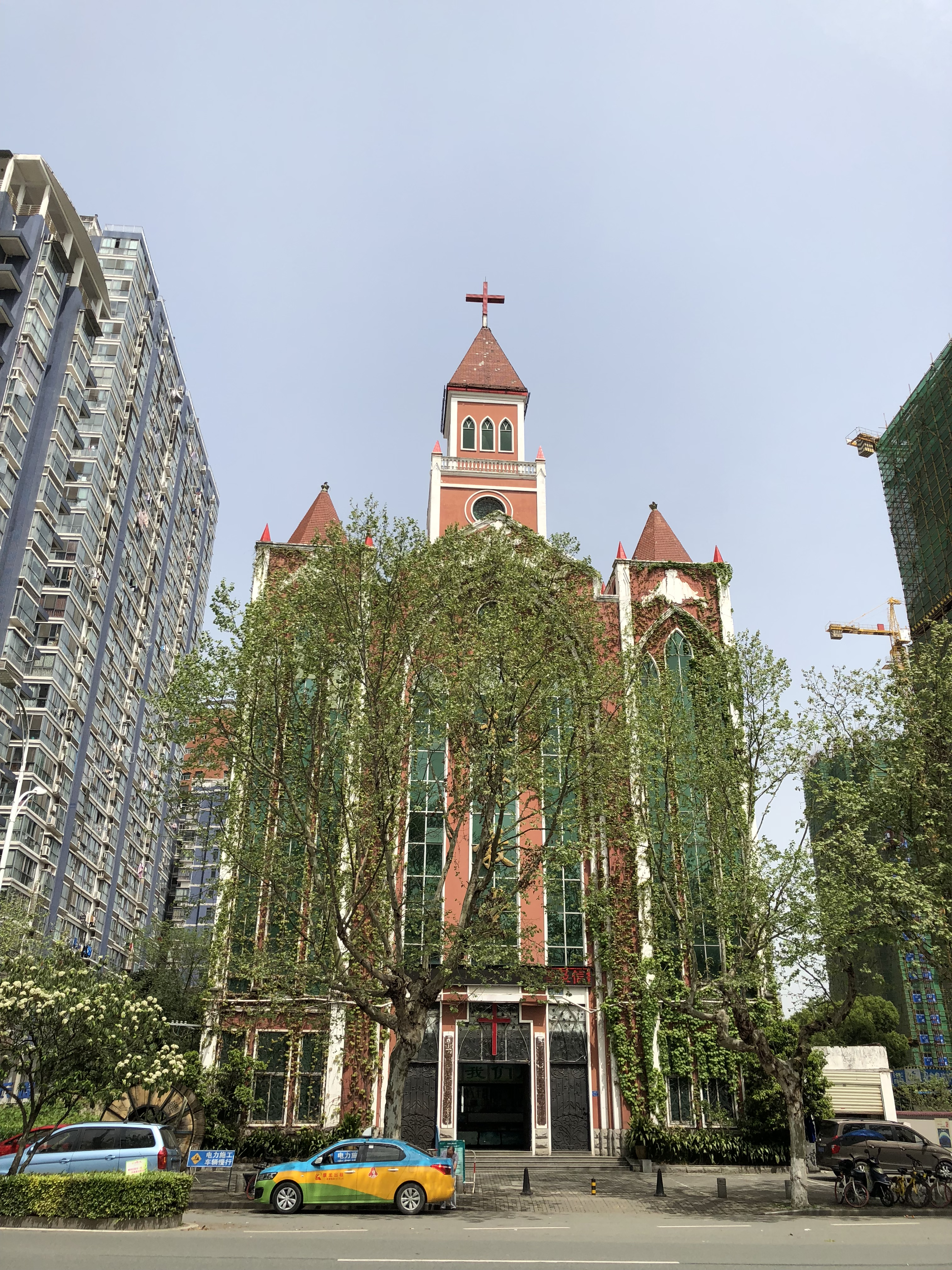
Christianity in Yichang

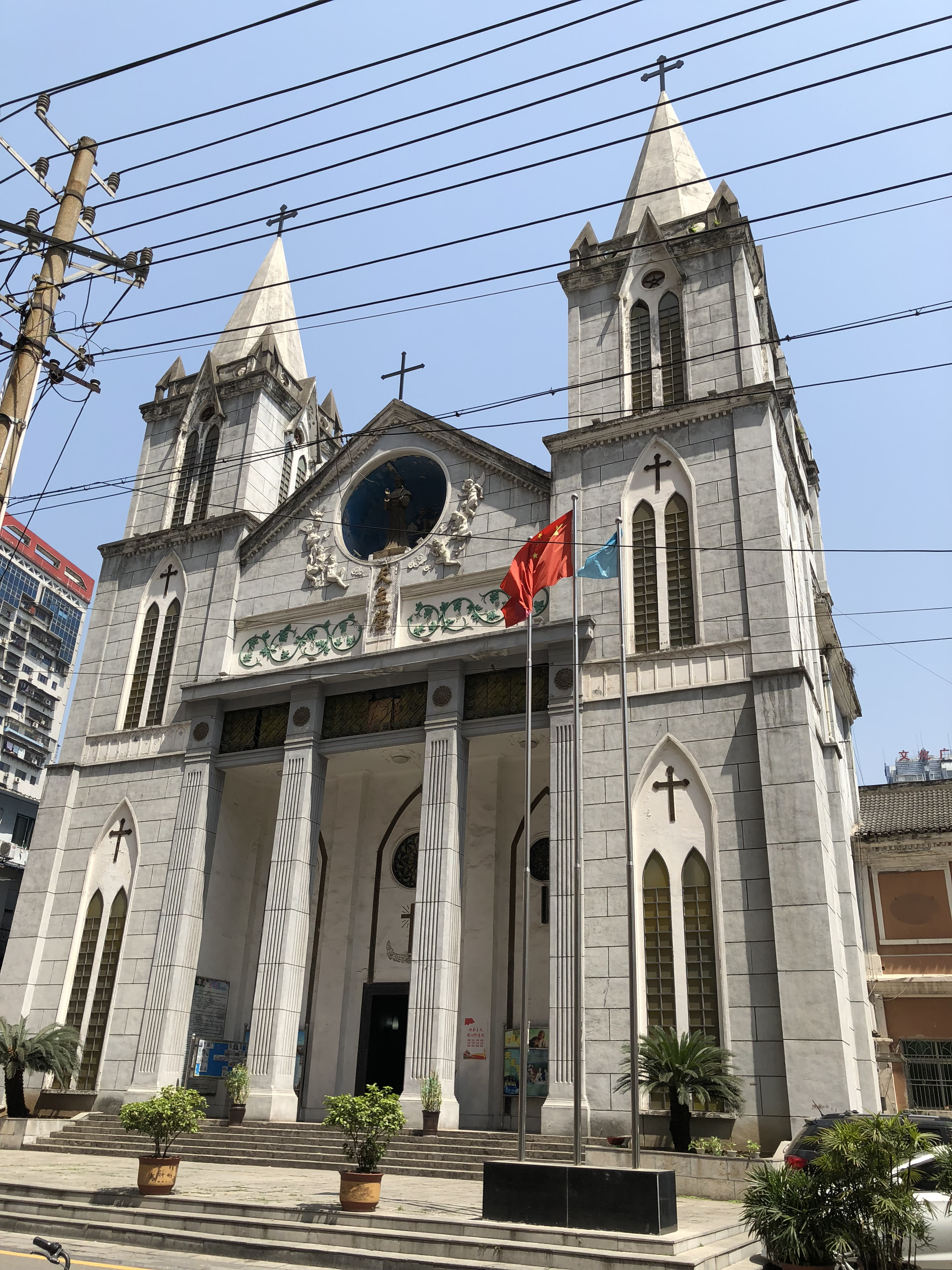
Roman Catholic Diocese of Yichang

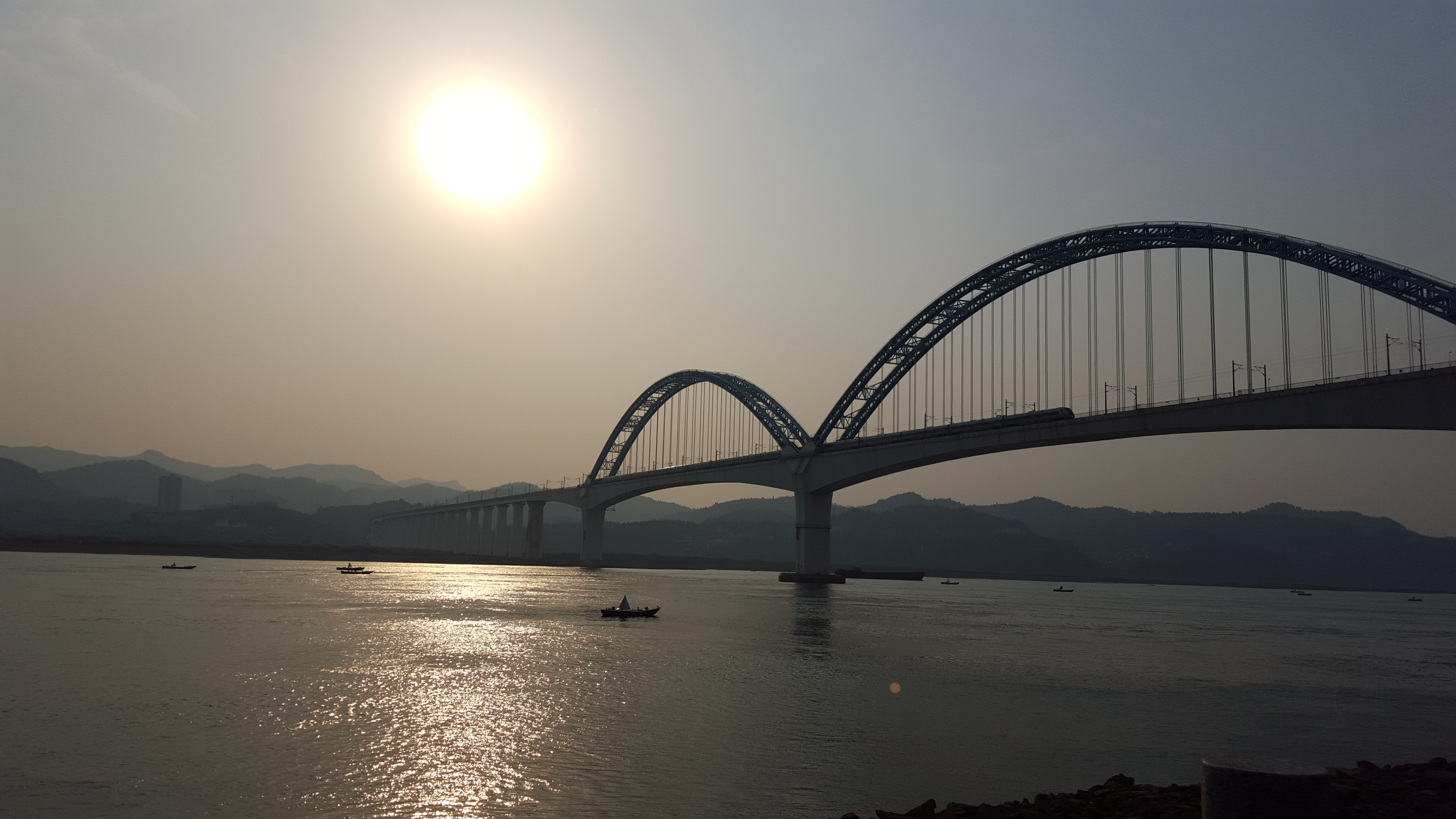
Yichang Yangtze River Railway Bridge

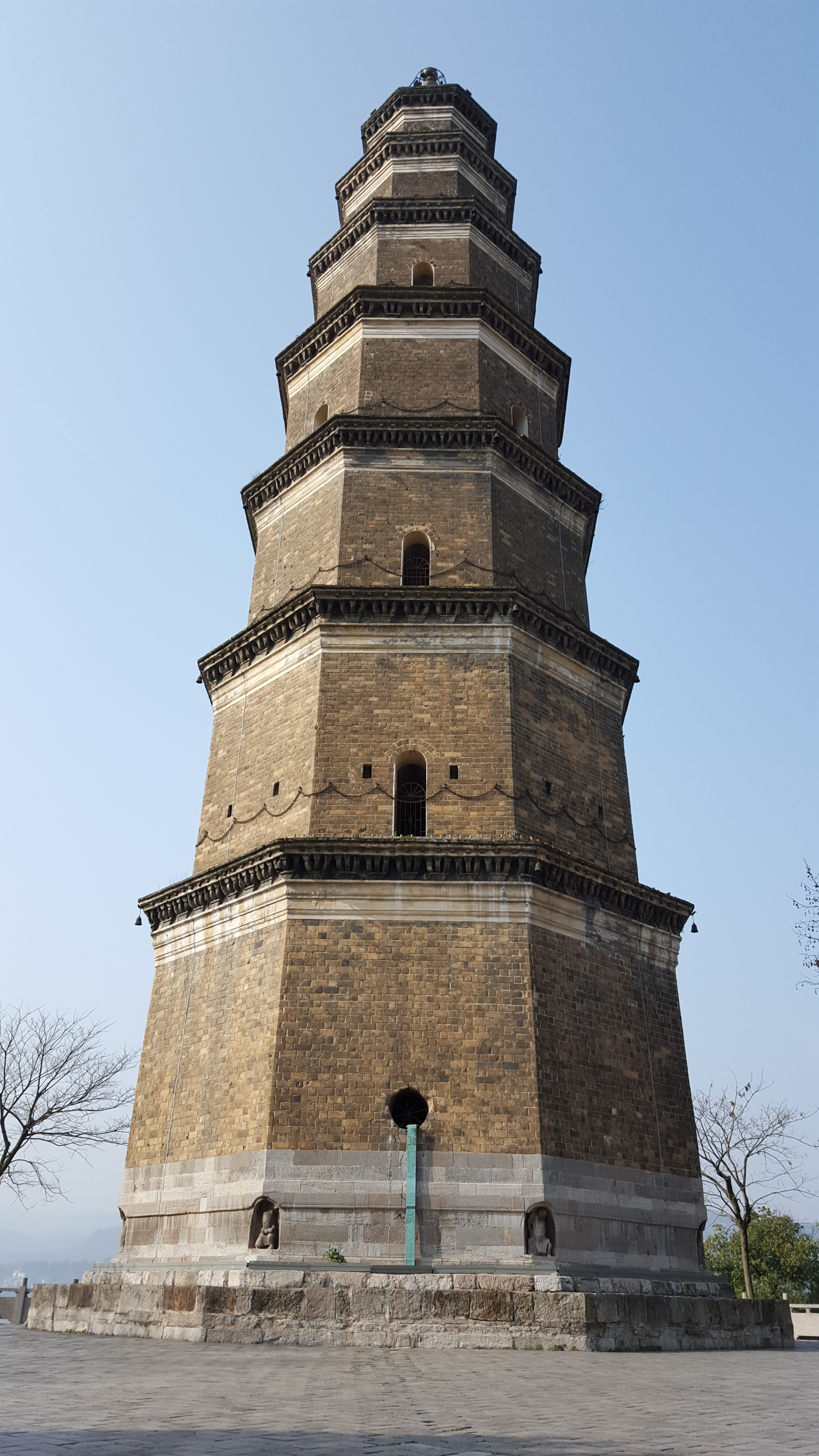
Tianran Pagoda

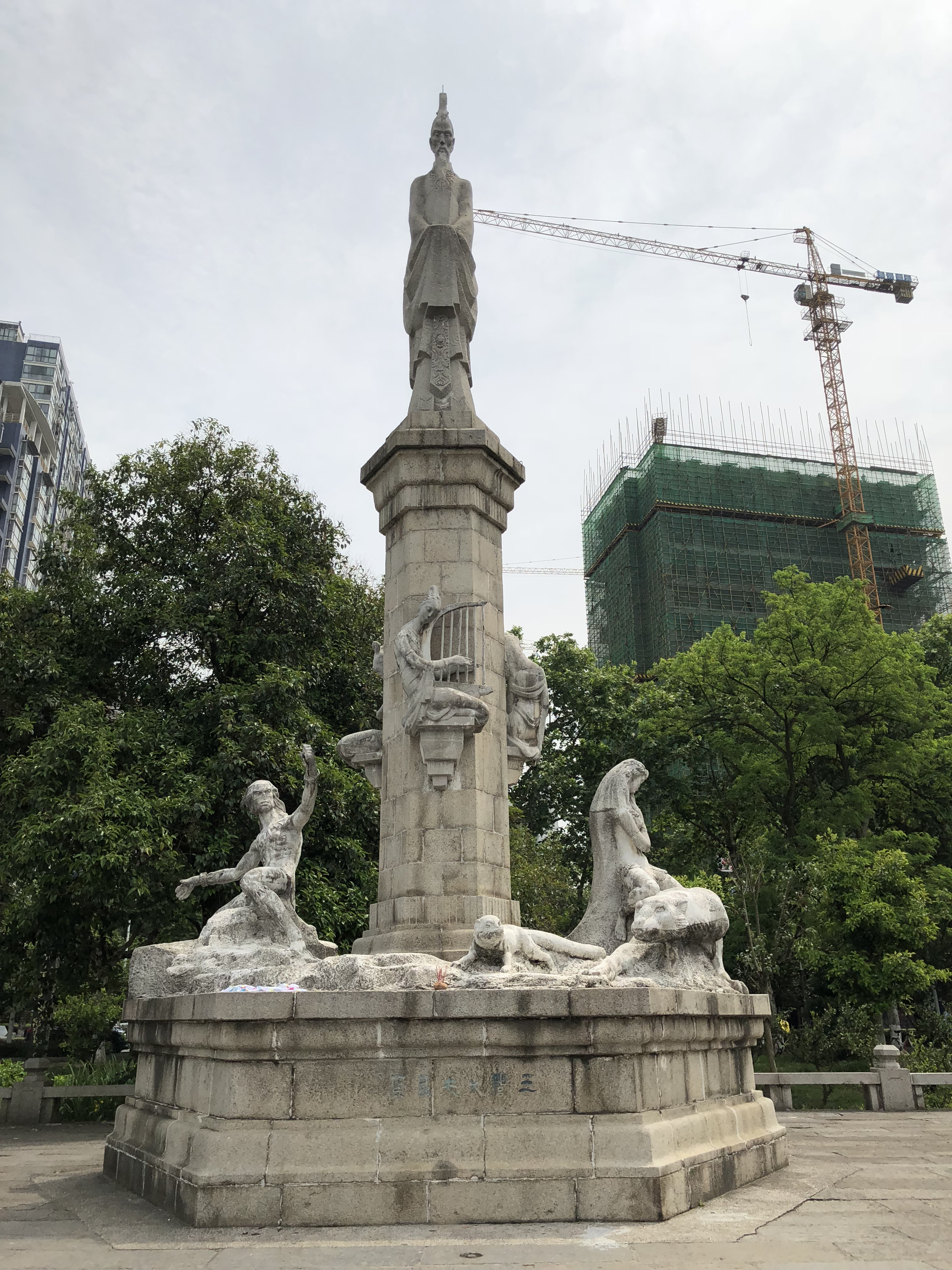
Statue of Quyuan

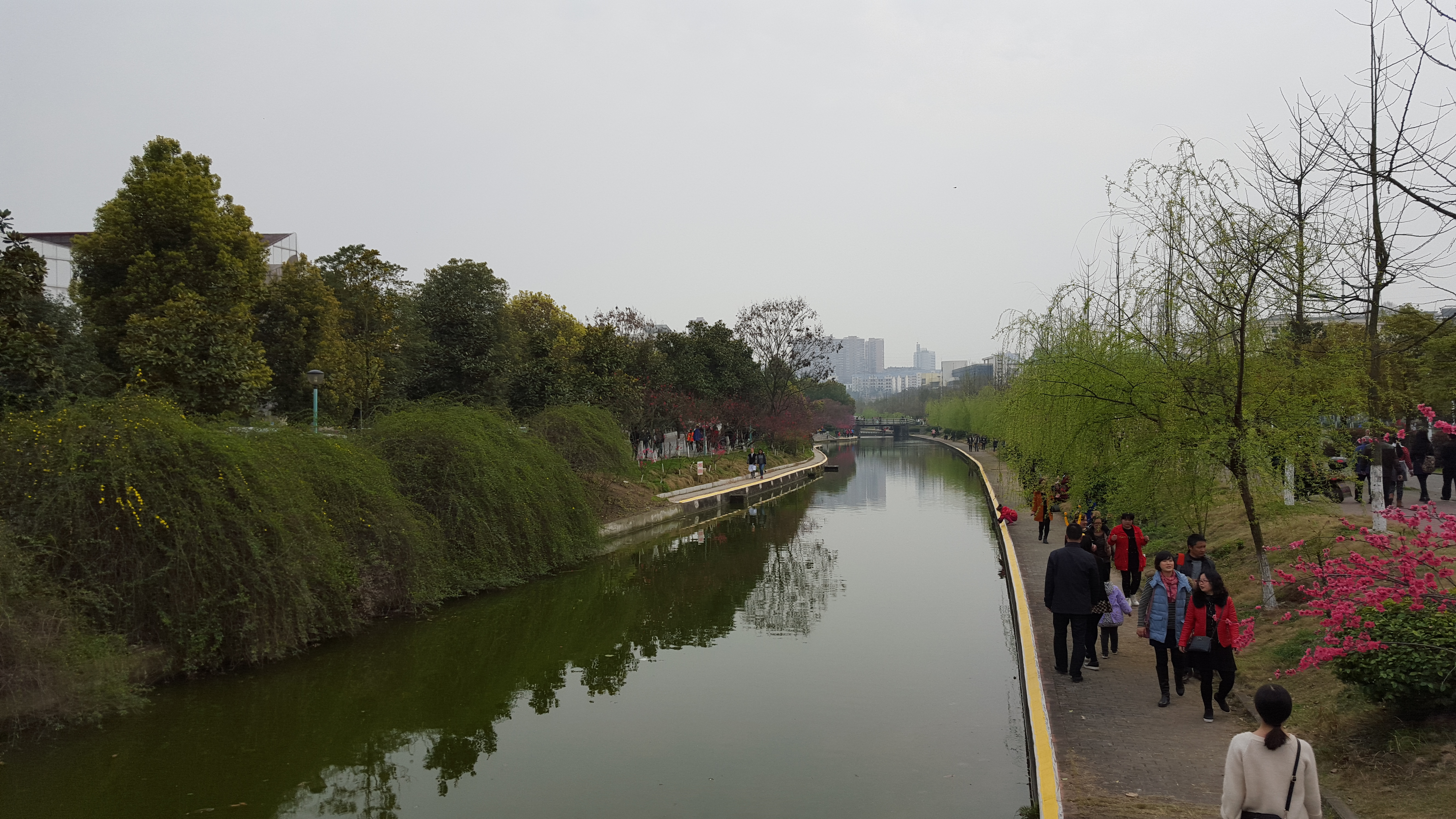
Three Gorges University

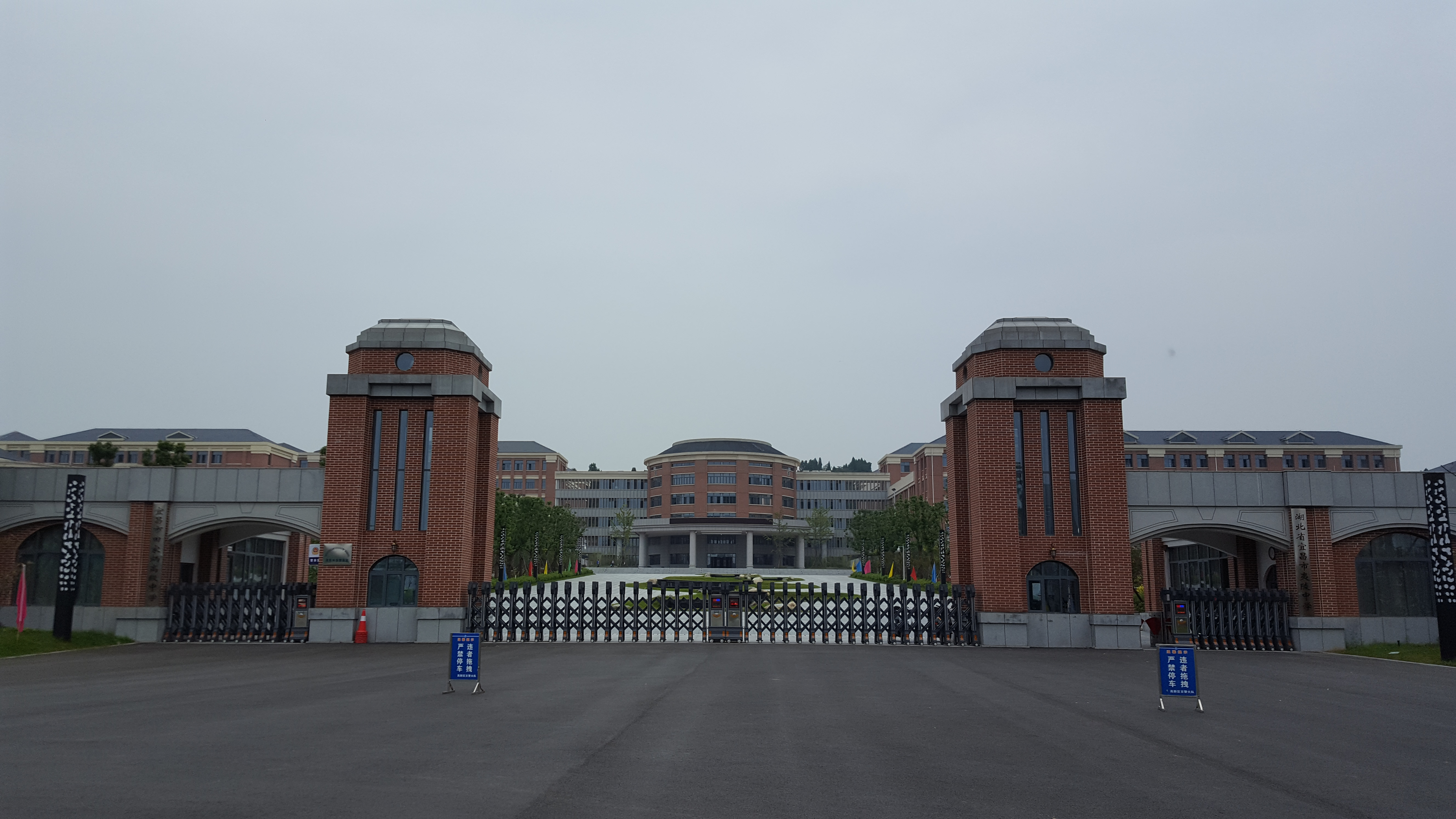
Yiling High School

== See also ==
- List of twin towns and sister cities in China
