= Wujiagang, Yichang =

Wujiagang 伍家岗区
- District
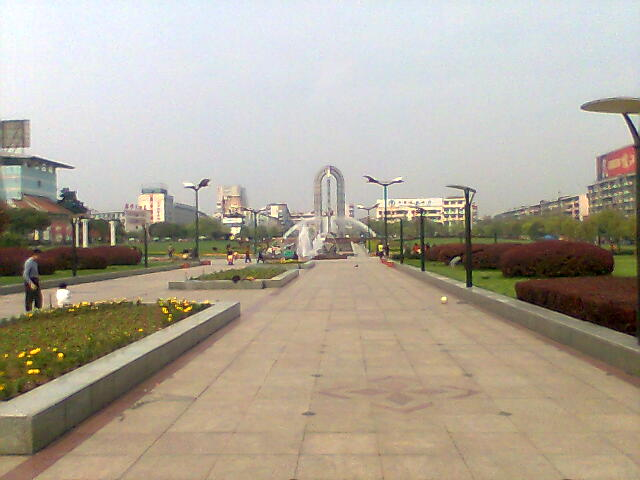

- Location in Hubei
- Coordinates (Wujiagang government): 30°38′38″N 111°21′40″E
- Country: People's Republic of China
- Province: Hubei
- Prefecture-level city: Yichang

Area
  - Total: 80 km^{2} (31 sq mi)

Population (2010)
  - Total: 214,194
  - Density: 2,700/km^{2} (6,900/sq mi)
- Time zone: UTC+8 (China Standard)
- Website: www.ycwjg.gov.cn

Wujiagang District (simplified Chinese: 伍家岗区; traditional Chinese: 伍家崗區; pinyin: Wǔjiāgǎng Qū) is a district of the city of Yichang, Hubei, People's Republic of China. Established in 1986, the territory of the whole area is 84.03 square kilometers. There are 33 community neighborhood committees in 4 Street offices and 16 village committees in 1 townships, with a total population of 214194 at the end of 2010. Wujiagang district is the old industrial district of Yichang City, with a large quantity of high quality industrial stock. There are more than 300 enterprises, enterprises and enterprises in the District, and the industrial output value accounts for more than 70% of the total industrial output value of the city's urban areas. By the end of 2013 has formed the Jinshan building materials, non-staple food, vegetables and fruits, Hengchang bridge Ding Xin auto parts, automobile trade city, Three Gorges building materials City, home-run supermarket market clusters, various professional markets reached 32, the business area of more than 16 square meters.

== Administrative divisions ==
Four subdistricts:

- Dagongqiao Subdistrict (大公桥街道), Wanshouqiao Subdistrict (万寿桥街道), Baotahe Subdistrict (宝塔河街道), Wujiagang Subdistrict (伍家岗街道)

The only township is Wujia Township (伍家乡)
