= Haiyang (disambiguation) =

Haiyang is coastal city in Shandong province in eastern China.

Haiyang may also refer to:

- Chao'an District, Chaozhou, Guangdong, formerly known as Haiyang
- Haiyang, Anhui (海阳), in Xiuning County, Anhui
- Haiyang, Hebei (海阳), in Qinhuangdao, Hebei
- Haiyang Township, Chongqing (海洋乡), in Xiushan Tujia and Miao Autonomous County, Chongqing
- Haiyang Township, Guangxi (海洋乡), in Lingchuan County, Guangxi

== Other uses ==
- Haiyang (satellite) or Haiyang, Chinese remote sensing satellites
