= Shuanggui (disambiguation) =

Shuanggui is an internal disciplinary process of the Chinese Communist Party's Central Commission for Discipline Inspection.

Shuanggui may also refer to these places in China:

- Shuanggui, Sichuan, in Jialing District, Nanchong, Sichuan
- Shuanggui, Zhong County, in Zhong County, Chongqing
- Shuanggui Subdistrict, Liangping District, Chongqing
- Shuanggui Temple, Buddhist temple also in Liangping District
