= Maguan Town =

Maguan Town may refer to the following towns in China:

- Maguan, Chongqing (马灌), in Zhong County, Chongqing
- Maguan, Gansu (马关), in Zhangjiachuan Hui Autonomous County, Gansu
- Maguan, Guizhou (马官), in Puding County, Guizhou

== See also ==
- Maguan County, a county in Wenshan Zhuang and Miao Autonomous Prefecture, Yunnan, China
