= List of township-level divisions of Chongqing =

Location of Chongqing Municipality in China

This is a list of township-level divisions of the municipality of Chongqing, People's Republic of China (PRC). After province, prefecture, and county-level divisions, township-level divisions constitute the formal fourth-level administrative divisions of the PRC. However, as Chongqing is a province-level municipality, the prefecture-level divisions are absent and so county-level divisions are at the second level, and township-level divisions are at the third level of administration. There are a total of 1,017 such divisions in Chongqing, divided into 193 subdistricts, 611 towns, 193 townships and 14 Ethnic townships. This list is organised by the county-level divisions of the municipality.

== Yuzhong District ==
Location of Yuzhong District in the municipality

Subdistricts:

- Qixinggang Subdistrict (七星岗街道), Jiefangbei Subdistrict (解放碑街道), Lianglukou Subdistrict (两路口街道), Shangqingsi Subdistrict (上清寺街道), Caiyuanba Subdistrict (菜园坝街道), Nanjimen Subdistrict (南纪门街道), Wanglongmen Subdistrict (望龙门街道), Chaotianmen Subdistrict (朝天门街道), Daxigou Subdistrict (大溪沟街道), Daping Subdistrict (大坪街道), Hualongqiao Subdistrict (化龙桥街道), Shiyoulu Subdistrict (石油路街道)

== Dadukou District ==
Location of Dadukou District in the municipality

Subdistricts:

- 新山村街道 (Xīn shāncūn jiē)
- 跃进村街道 (Yuèjìn cūn jiē, Literally: Yuejincun Street)
- 九宫庙街道 (Jiǔgōng miào jiē, Literally: Jiugongmiao Street)
- 茄子溪街道 (Qiézi xī jiē, Literally: Eggplant Creek Street)
- 春晖路街道 (Chūnhuī lù jiē, Literally: Chunhui Road Street)

Towns:

- 八桥镇 (Bā qiáo zhèn)
- 建胜镇 (Jiàn shèng zhèn)
- 跳磴镇 (Tiào dèng zhèn)

== Jiangbei District ==
Location of Jiangbei District in the municipality

Subdistricts:

- 华新街街道 (Huaxin Street)
- 江北城街道 (Jiangbei Street)
- 石马河街道 (Shimahe Street)
- 大石坝街道 (Dashiba Street)
- 寸滩街道 (Cuntan Street)
- 观音桥街道 (Guanyinqiao Street)
- 五里店街道 (Wulidian Street)
- 郭家沱街道 (Guojiatuo Street)
- 铁山坪街道 (Tieshanping Street)

Towns:

- 鱼嘴镇 (Yuzui Town)
- 复盛镇 (Fusheng Town)
- 五宝镇 (Wubao Town)

== Shapingba District ==
Location of Shapingba District in the municipality

Subdistricts:

- 小龙坎街道 (Xiaolongkan Street)
- 沙坪坝街道 (Shapingba Street)
- 渝碚路街道 (Yupei Street)
- 磁器口街道 (Chiqu Street)
- 童家桥街道 (TongJia Street)
- 石井坡街道 (Shijingpo Street)
- 詹家溪街道 (Zhanjiaxi Street)
- 井口街道 (Jingkou Street)
- 歌乐山街道 (Geleshan Street)
- 山洞街道 (Shandong Street)
- 新桥街道 (Xinqiao Street)
- 天星桥街道 (Tianxingqiao Street)
- 土湾街道 (Tuwan Street)
- 覃家岗街道 (Tanjiagang Street)
- 陈家桥街道 (Chenjiaqiao Street)
- 虎溪街道 (Huxi Street)
- 西永街道 (Xiyang Street)
- 联芳街道 (Lianfeng Street)

Towns:

- 井口镇 (Jingkou Town)
- 歌乐山镇 (gele Town)
- 青木关镇 (qingmuguan Town)
- 凤凰镇 (Fenghuang Town)
- 回龙坝镇 (Huilongba Town)
- 曾家镇 (Zengjia Town)
- 土主镇 (Tuzhu Town)
- 中梁镇 (Zhongliang Town)

== Jiulongpo District ==
Location of Jiulongpo District in the municipality

Subdistricts:

- Yangjiaping Subdistrict (杨家坪街道), Huangjueping Subdistrict (黄桷坪街道), Xiejiawan Subdistrict (谢家湾街道), Shipingqiao Subdistrict (石坪桥街道), Shiqiaopu Subdistrict (石桥铺街道), Erlang Subdistrict (二郎街道), Zhongliangshan Subdistrict (中梁山街道), Yuzhou Road Subdistrict (渝州路街道)

Towns:

- Jiulong (九龙镇), Huayan (华岩镇), Hangu (含谷镇), Jinfeng (金凤镇), Baishiyi (白市驿镇), Zouma (走马镇), Shiban (石板镇), Bafu (巴福镇), Taojia (陶家镇), Xipeng (西彭镇), Tongguanyi (铜罐驿镇)

== Nan'an District ==
Location of Nan'an District in the municipality

Subdistricts:

- 铜元局街道 (Tongyuanju Street)
- 花园路街道 (Huayuanlu Street)
- 南坪街道 (Nanping Street)
- 海棠溪街道 (Haitang Street)
- 龙门浩街道 (Longmenhao Street)
- 弹子石街道 (Dangzi Street)
- 南山街道 (Nanshan Street)

Towns:

- 南坪镇 (Nanping Town)
- 涂山镇 (Tushan Town)
- 鸡冠石镇 (Jiguan Town)
- 峡口镇 (Shakou Town)
- 长生桥镇 (Changsheng Town)
- 迎龙镇 (Yinglon Town)
- 广阳镇 (Guanyang Town)

== Banan District ==
Location of Banan District in the municipality

Subdistricts:

- 龙洲湾街道 (LongZhouwan Street)
- 鱼洞街道 (Yudong Street)
- 花溪街道 (Huaxi Street)
- 李家沱街道 (Lijiatuo Street)
- 南泉街道 (Nanquan Street)
- 一品街道 (Yipin Street)
- 南彭街道 (Nanpeng Street)
- 惠民街道 (Huimin Street)

Towns:

- 界石镇 (Jieshi Town)
- 安澜镇 (Anlan Town)
- 跳石镇 (Tiaoshi Town)
- 木洞镇 (Mudong Town)
- 双河口镇 (Shuanhe Town)
- 麻柳嘴镇 (Maliuzui Town)
- 丰盛镇 (Fengsheng Town)
- 二圣镇 (Ersheng Town)
- 东泉镇 (Dongquan Town)
- 姜家镇 (Jiangjia Town)
- 天星寺镇 (Tianxingshi Town)
- 接龙镇 (Jielong Town)
- 石滩镇 (Shitang Town)
- 石龙镇 (Shilong Town)

== Beibei District ==
Location of Beibei District in the municipality

Subdistricts:

- 天生街道 (TianSheng Street)
- 朝阳街道 (Zhaoyang Street)
- 北温泉街道 (Beiwenquan Street)
- 东阳街道 (Dongyang Street)
- 龙凤桥街道 (Longfengqiao Street)

Towns:

- 歇马镇 (Xiema Town)
- 澄江镇 (Chengjiang Town)
- 蔡家岗镇 (Caijiagang Town)
- 童家溪镇 (Tongjiaxi Town)
- 天府镇 (Tianfu Town)
- 施家梁镇 (Shijialiang Town)
- 水土镇 (Suitu Town)
- 静观镇 (Jingguan Town)
- 柳荫镇 (Liumeng Town)
- 复兴镇 (Fuxing Town)
- 三圣镇 (Sansheng Town)
- 金刀峡镇 (Jindaoxia Town)

== Yubei District ==
Location of Yubei District in the municipality

Subdistricts:

- 双龙湖街道 (Shuanglonghu Street)
  - Xiantao Subdistrict (仙桃街道)
- 回兴街道 (Huixing Street)
- 鸳鸯街道 (Yuanyang Street)
- 翠云街道 (Cuiyun Street)
- 人和街道 (Renhe Street)
- 天宫殿街道 (Tiangongdian Street)
- 龙溪街道 (Longxi Street)
- 龙山街道 (Longshan Street)
- 龙塔街道 ( Longta Street)
- 大竹林街道 (Dazhulin Street)
- 悦来街道 (Yuelai Street)
- 两路街道 (Lianglu Street)
- 双凤桥街道 (Shuangfengqiao Street)
- 王家街道 (Wangjia Street)

Towns:

- 礼嘉镇 (Lijia Town)
- 玉峰山镇 (Yufeng Town)
- 龙兴镇 (Longxing Town)
- 统景镇 (Tongjing Town)
- 大湾镇 (Dawang Town)
- 兴隆镇 (Xinglong Town)
- 木耳镇 (Muer Town)
- 茨竹镇 (Cizhu Town)
- 古路镇 (Gulu Town)
- 石船镇 (Shichuan Town)
- 大盛镇 (DaSheng Town)
- 洛碛镇 (Luoqi Town)

== Bishan District ==
Location of Bishan District in the municipality

Subdistricts:

- 璧城街道 (Bicheng Street)
- 璧泉街道 (Biquan Street)
- 青杠街道 (Qinggang Street)
- 来凤街道 (Laifeng Street)
- 丁家街道 (Dingjia Street)
- 大路街道 (Dalu Street)

Towns:

- 八塘镇 (Batang Town)
- 七塘镇 (qitang Town)
- 河边镇 (Hebian Town)
- 福禄镇 (Fulu Town)
- 大兴镇 (Daxing Town)
- 正兴镇 (Zhengxing Town)
- 广普镇 (Guangpu Town)
- 三合镇 (Sanhe Town)
- 健龙镇 (Jianlong Town)

== Changshou District ==
Location of Changshou District in the municipality

Subdistricts:

- 凤城街道 (Fengcheng Street)
- 晏家街道 (Yanjia Street)
- 江南街道 (Jiangnan Street)
- 渡舟街道 (Duzhou Street)

Towns:

- 邻封镇 (Linfeng Town)
- 但渡镇 (Dandu Town)
- 云集镇 (Yunji Town)
- 长寿湖镇 (Changshouhu Town)
- 双龙镇 (Shuanglong Town)
- 龙河镇 (Longhe Town)
- 石堰镇 (Shiyan Town)
- 云台镇 (Yuntai Town)
- 海棠镇 (Haitang Town)
- 葛兰镇 (Gelan Town)
- 新市镇 (Xinshi Town)
- 八颗镇 (Bake Town)
- 洪湖镇 (Honghu Town)
- 万顺镇 (Wanshun Town)

== Dazu District ==
Location of Dazu District in the municipality

Subdistricts:

- 龙岗街道 (Longgang Street)
- 棠香街道 (Tangxiang Street)
- 龙滩子街道 (Longtanzi Street)

Towns:

- 龙水镇 (Longshui Town)
- 智凤镇 (Zhifeng Town)
- 宝顶镇 (Baoding Town)
- 中敖镇 (Zhongao Town)
- 三驱镇 (sanqu Town)
- 宝兴镇 (Baoxing Town)
- 玉龙镇 (Yulong Town)
- 石马镇 (Shima Town)
- 拾万镇 (Shiwan Town)
- 回龙镇 (Huilong Town)
- 金山镇 (Jinshan Town)
- 万古镇 (Wangu Town)
- 国梁镇 (Gualiang Town)
- 雍溪镇 (Yongxi Town)
- 珠溪镇 (Zhuxi Town)
- 龙石镇 (Longshi Town)
- 邮亭镇 (Youting Town)
- 铁山镇 (Tieshan Town)
- 高升镇 (Gaosheng Town)
- 季家镇 (Jijia Town)
- 古龙镇 (Gulong Town)
- 高坪镇 (Gaoping Town)
- 双路镇 (Shuanglu Town)
- 通桥镇 (Tongqiao Town)

== Hechuan District ==
Location of Hechuan District in the municipality

Subdistricts:

- 合阳城街道 (Heyangcheng Street)
- 钓鱼城街道 (Diaoyucheng Street)
- 南津街街道 (Nanjinjie Street)
- 盐井街道 (Yanjing Street)
- 草街街道 (Caojie Street)
- 云门街道 (Yunmen Street)
- 大石街道 (Dashi Street)

Towns:

- 沙鱼镇 (Shayu Town)
- 官渡镇 (Guandu Town)
- 涞滩镇 (Laitan Town)
- 肖家镇 (Xiaojia Town)
- 古楼镇 (Gulou Town)
- 三庙镇 (Sanmiao Town)
- 二郎镇 (Erlang Town)
- 龙凤镇 (Longfeng Town)
- 隆兴镇 (Longxing Town)
- 铜溪镇 (Tongxi Town)
- 双凤镇 (Shuangfeng Town)
- 狮滩镇 (Shitang Town)
- 清平镇 (Qingping Town)
- 土场镇 (Tuchang Town)
- 小沔镇 (Xiaomian Town)
- 三汇镇 (Sanhui Town)
- 香龙镇 (Xianglong Town)
- 钱塘镇 (Qiantang Town)
- 龙市镇 (Longshi Town)
- 燕窝镇 (Yanwo Town)
- 太和镇 (Taihe Town)
- 渭沱镇 (Weituo Town)
- 双槐镇 (Shuanghuai Town)

== Jiangjin District ==
Location of Jiangjin District in the municipality

Subdistricts:

- 几江街道 (Jijiang Street)
- 德感街道 (Degang Street)
- 双福街道 (Shuangfu Street)
- 鼎山街道 (Dingshan Street)

Towns:

- 油溪镇 (Youxi Town)
- 吴滩镇 (Wutang Town)
- 石门镇 (Shimen Town)
- 朱杨镇 (Zhuyang Town)
- 石蟆镇 (Shimo Town)
- 永兴镇 (Yangxing Town)
- 塘河镇 (Tanghe Town)
- 白沙镇 (Baisha Town)
- 龙华镇 (Longhua Town)
- 李市镇 (Lishi Town)
- 慈云镇 (Ciyun Town)
- 蔡家镇 (Caijia Town)
- 中山镇 (Zhongshan Town)
- 嘉平镇 (Jiaping Town)
- 柏林镇 (Bolin Town)
- 先锋镇 (Xiangfeng Town)
- 珞璜镇 (Luohuang Town)
- 贾嗣镇 (Jiasi Town)
- 夏坝镇 (Xiaba Town)
- 西湖镇 (Xihu Town)
- 杜市镇 (Dushi Town)
- 广兴镇 (Guangxing Town)
- 四面山镇 (Simianshan Town)
- 支坪镇 (Zhiping Town)

== Qijiang District ==
Location of Qijiang in the municipality

Subdistricts:

- 古南街道 (Gunan Street)
- 文龙街道 (Wenlong Street)
- 三江街道 (Sanjiang Street)
- 万盛街道 (Wansheng Street)
- 东林街道 (Donglin Street)

Towns:

- 万东镇 (Wandong Town)
- 南桐镇 (Nantong Town)
- 青年镇 (Qingnian Town)
- 关坝镇 (Guanba Town)
- 丛林镇 (Conglin Town)
- 石林镇 (Shilin Town)
- 金桥镇 (Jinqiao Town)
- 黑山镇 (Heishan Town)
- 石角镇 (Shijiao Town)
- 东溪镇 (Dongxi Town)
- 赶水镇 (Zhaoshui Town)
- 打通镇 (Datong Town)
- 石壕镇 (Shihao Town)
- 永新镇 (Yangxin Town)
- 三角镇 (Sanjiao Town)
- 隆盛镇 (Longsheng Town)
- 郭扶镇 (Guofu Town)
- 篆塘镇 (Zhuangtang Town)
- 丁山镇 (Dingshan Town)
- 安稳镇 (Anwen Town)
- 扶欢镇 (Fuhuan Town)
- 永城镇 (Yangcheng Town)
- 新盛镇 (Xinsheng Town)
- 中峰镇 (Zhongfeng Town)
- 横山镇 (Hengshan Town)

== Yongchuan District ==
Location of Yongchuan District in the municipality

Subdistricts:

- 中山路街道 (Zhongshanlu Street)
- 胜利路街道 (Shenglilu Street)
- 南大街街道 (Nandajie Street)
- 茶山竹海街道 (Chashanzhuhai Street)
- 大安街道 (Daan Street)
- 陈食街道 (Chenshi Street)
- 卫星湖街道 (Weixinghu Street)

Towns:

- 青峰镇 (Qingfeng Town)
- 金龙镇 (Jinlong Town)
- 临江镇 (Linjiang Town)
- 何埂镇 (Hegeng Town)
- 松溉镇 (Shonggai Town)
- 仙龙镇 (Xianlong Town)
- 吉安镇 (Jian Town)
- 五间镇 (Wujian Town)
- 来苏镇 (Laisu Town)
- 宝峰镇 (Baofeng Town)
- 双石镇 (Shuangshi Town)
- 红炉镇 (Honglu Town)
- 永荣镇 (Yangrong Town)
- 三教镇 (Sanjiao Town)
- 板桥镇 (Banqiao Town)
- 朱沱镇 (Zhutuo Town)

== Tongliang District ==
Location of Tongliang District in the municipality

Subdistricts:

- 巴川街道 (Bacuan Street)
- 东城街道 (Dongcheng Street)
- 南城街道 (Nancheng Street)

Towns:

- 土桥镇 (Tuqiao Town)
- 二坪镇 (Erping Town)
- 水口镇 (Shikou Town)
- 安居镇 (Anju Town)
- 白羊镇 (Baiyang Town)
- 平滩镇 (Pingtang Town)
- 石鱼镇 (Shiyu Town)
- 福果镇 (Fuguo Town)
- 维新镇 (Weixin Town)
- 高楼镇 (Gaolou Town)
- 大庙镇 (Damiao Town)
- 围龙镇 (Weilong Town)
- 华兴镇 (Huaxing Town)
- 永嘉镇 (Yangjia Town)
- 安溪镇 (Anxi Town)
- 西河镇 (Xihe Town)
- 太平镇 (Taiping Town)
- 旧县镇 (Jiuxian Town)
- 虎峰镇 (Hufeng Town)
- 少云镇 (Shaoyun Town)
- 蒲吕镇 (Pulv Town)
- 侣俸镇 (Lvfeng Town)
- 小林镇 (Xiaolin Town)
- 双山镇 (Shuangshan Town)
- 庆隆镇 (Qinglong Town)

== Fuling District ==
Location of Fuling District in the municipality

Subdistricts:

- 敦仁街道 (Dunren Street)
- 崇义街道 (Chongyi Street)
- 荔枝街道 (Lizhi Street)
- 江北街道 (Jiangbei Street)
- 江东街道 (Jiangdong Street)
- 李渡街道 (Lidu Street)
- 龙桥街道 (Longqiao Street)
- 白涛街道 (Baitao Street)

Towns:

- 南沱镇 (Nantuo Town)
- 青羊镇 (Qingyang Town)
- 百胜镇 (Baisheng Town)
- 珍溪镇 (Zhenxi Town)
- 清溪镇 (Qingxi Town)
- 焦石镇 (Jiaoshi Town)
- 马武镇 (Mawu Town)
- 龙潭镇 (Longtan Town)
- 蔺市镇 (Linshi Town)
- 新妙镇 (Xinmiao Town)
- 石沱镇 (Shituo Town)
- 义和镇 (Yihe Town)

Townships:

- 罗云乡 (Luoyun Township)
- 大木乡 (Damu Township)
- 武陵山乡 (Wilingshan Township)
- 大顺乡 (Dashun Township)
- 增福乡 (Zengfu Township)
- 同乐乡 (Tongle Township)

== Nanchuan District ==
Location of Nanchuan District in the municipality

Subdistricts:

- 东城街道 (Dongcheng Street)
- 南城街道 (Nancheng Street)
- 西城街道 (Xicheng Street)

Towns:

- 三泉镇 (Sanquan Town)
- 南平镇 (Nanping Town)
- 神童镇 (Shentong Town)
- 鸣玉镇 (Mingyu Town)
- 大观镇 (Daguan Town)
- 兴隆镇 (Xinglong Town)
- 太平场镇 (Taipingchang Town)
- 白沙镇 (Baisha Town)
- 水江镇 (Shuijiang Town)
- 石墙镇 (Shiqiang Town)
- 金山镇 (Jinshan Town)
- 头渡镇 (Toudu Town)
- 大有镇 (Dayou Town)
- 合溪镇 (Hexi Town)
- 黎香湖镇 (Lishianghu Town)

Townships:

- 石莲乡 (Shilian Township)
- 木凉乡 (Muliang Township)
- 河图乡 (Hetu Township)
- 乾丰乡 (Ganfeng Township)
- 骑龙乡 (Qilong Township)
- 鱼泉乡 (Yuchun Township)
- 中桥乡 (Zhongqiao Township)
- 铁村乡 (Tiecun Township)
- 德隆乡 (Delong Township)
- 庆元乡 (Qingyuan Township)
- 古花乡 (Guhua Township)
- 峰岩乡 (Fengyan Township)
- 民主乡 (Minzhu Township)
- 冷水关乡 (Lenshui Township)
- 石溪乡 (Shixi Township)
- 福寿乡 (Fushou Township)

== Wanzhou District ==
Location of Wanzhou District in the municipality

Subdistricts:

- 高笋塘街道 (Gaosuntang Street)
- 太白街道 (Taibai Street)
- 牌楼街道 (Pailou Street)
- 双河口街道 (Shuanghekou Street)
- 龙都街道 (Longdu Street)
- 周家坝街道 (Zhoujiaba Street)
- 沙河街道 (Shahe Street)
- 钟鼓楼街道 (Zhonggulou Street)
- 百安坝街道 (Baianba Street)
- 五桥街道 (Wuqiao Street)
- 陈家坝街道 (Chenjiaba Street)

Towns:

- 小周镇 (Xiaozhou Town)
- 大周镇 (Dazhou Town)
- 新乡镇 (Xinxiang Town)
- 孙家镇 (Sunjia Town)
- 高峰镇 (Gaofeng Town)
- 龙沙镇 (Longsha Town)
- 响水镇 (Xiangshui Town)
- 武陵镇 (Wuling Town)
- 瀼渡镇 (Xiangdu Town)
- 甘宁镇 (Ganning Town)
- 天城镇 (Tiancheng Town)
- 熊家镇 (Xiongjia Town)
- 高梁镇 (Gaoliang Town)
- 李河镇 (Lihe Town)
- 分水镇 (Fenshui Town)
- 余家镇 (Yujia Town)
- 后山镇 (Houshan Town)
- 弹子镇 (Danzi Town)
- 长岭镇 (Changling Town)
- 新田镇 (Xintian Town)
- 白羊镇 (Baiyang Town)
- 龙驹镇 (Longju Town)
- 走马镇 (zouma Town)
- 罗田镇 (Luotian Town)
- 太龙镇 (Tailong Town)
- 长滩镇 (Changtan Town)
- 太安镇 (Taian Town)
- 白土镇 (Baitu Town)
- 郭村镇 (Guocun Town)

Townships:

- 柱山乡 (Zhushan Township)
- 铁峰乡 (Tiefeng Township)
- 溪口乡 (Xikou Township)
- 长坪乡 (Changping Township)
- 燕山乡 (Yanshan Township)
- 梨树乡 (Lishu Township)
- 普子乡 (Puzi Township)
- 黄柏乡 (Huangbo Township)
- 九池乡 (Jiuchi Township)
- 茨竹乡 (Cizhu Township)

Ethnic Townships:

- 地宝土家族乡 (Dibaotujiazu Township)
- 恒合土家族乡 (Henghetujiazu Township)

== Qianjiang District ==
Location of Qianjiang District in the municipality

Subdistricts:

- 城东街道 (Chengdong Street)
- 城南街道 (Chengnan Street)
- 城西街道 (Chengxi Street)
- 正阳街道 (Zhengyang Street)
- 舟白街道 (Zhoubai Street)
- 冯家街道 (Fengjia Street)

Towns:

- 阿蓬江镇 (Apeng Town)
- 石会镇 (Shihui Town)
- 黑溪镇 (Heixi Town)
- 黄溪镇 (Huangxi Town)
- 黎水镇 (Lishui Town)
- 金溪镇 (Jinxi Town)
- 马喇镇 (Mala Town)
- 濯水镇 (Zhuoshui Town)
- 石家河镇 (Shijiahe Town)
- 鹅池镇 (Erchi Town)
- 小南海镇 (Xiaonan Town)
- 邻鄂镇 (Linger Town)

Townships:

- 中塘乡 (Zhongtang Township)
- 蓬东乡 (Pengdong Township)
- 沙坝乡 (Shaba Township)
- 白石乡 (Baishi Township)
- 杉岭乡 (Shangling Township)
- 太极乡 (Taiji Township)
- 水田乡 (Shuitian Township)
- 白土乡 (Baitu Township)
- 金洞乡 (Jindong Township)
- 五里乡 (Wuli Township)
- 水市乡 (Shuishi Township)
- 新华乡 (Xinhua Township)

== Rongchang County ==
Location of Rongchang County in the municipality

Subdistricts:

- 昌元街道 (Changyuan Street)
- 昌洲街道 (Changzhou Street)
- 广顺街道 (Guangshun Street)
- 双河街道 (Shuanghe Street)
- 安富街道 (Anfu Street)
- 峰高街道 (Fenggao Street)

Towns:

- 直升镇 (Zhisheng Town)
- 路孔镇 (Lukong Town)
- 清江镇 (Qingjiang Town)
- 仁义镇 (Renyi Town)
- 河包镇 (Hebao Town)
- 古昌镇 (Guchang Town)
- 吴家镇 (Wujia Town)
- 观胜镇 (Guangsheng Town)
- 铜鼓镇 (Tonggu Town)
- 清流镇 (Qingliu Town)
- 盘龙镇 (Panlong Town)
- 远觉镇 (Yuanjue Town)
- 清升镇 (Qingsheng Town)
- 荣隆镇 (Ronglong Town)
- 龙集镇 (Longji Town)

== Tongnan County ==
Location of Tongnan County in the municipality

Subdistricts:

- 桂林街道 (Guilin Street)
- 梓潼街道 (Zhitong Street)

Towns:

- 上和镇 (Shanghe Town)
- 龙形镇 (Longxing Town)
- 古溪镇 (Guxi Town)
- 宝龙镇 (Baolong Town)
- 玉溪镇 (Yuxi Town)
- 米心镇 (Mixin Town)
- 群力镇 (Qunli Town)
- 双江镇 (Shuangjiang Town)
- 花岩镇 (Huayan Town)
- 柏梓镇 (Bozhi Town)
- 崇龛镇 (Chongkan Town)
- 塘坝镇 (Tangba Town)
- 新胜镇 (Xinsheng Town)
- 太安镇 (Taian Town)
- 小渡镇 (Xiaodu Town)
- 卧佛镇 (Wuofo Town)
- 五桂镇 (Wugui Town)
- 田家镇 (Tianjia Town)
- 别口镇 (Biekou Town)
- 寿桥镇 (Shouqiao Town)

== Dianjiang County ==
Location of Dianjiang County in the municipality

Towns:

- 桂溪镇 (Guixi Town)
- 新民镇 (Xinmin Town)
- 沙坪镇 (Shaping Town)
- 周嘉镇 (Zhoujia Town)
- 普顺镇 (Pushun Town)
- 永安镇 (Yongan Town)
- 高安镇 (Gaoan Town)
- 高峰镇 (Gaofeng Town)
- 五洞镇 (Wudong Town)
- 澄溪镇 (Chengxi Town)
- 太平镇 (Taiping Town)
- 鹤游镇 (Heyou Town)
- 坪山镇 (Pingshan Town)
- 砚台镇 (Yantai Town)
- 曹回镇 (Caohui Town)
- 杠家镇 (Gangjia Town)
- 包家镇 (Baojia Town)
- 白家镇 (Baijia Town)
- 永平镇 (Yongping Town)
- 三溪镇 (Sanxi Town)
- 裴兴镇 (Peixing Town)

Townships:

- 长龙乡 (Changlong Township)
- 沙河乡 (Shahe Township)
- 大石乡 (Dashi Township)
- 黄沙乡 (Huangsha Township)

== Fengdu County ==
Location of Fengdu County in the municipality

Two subdistricts:

- 三合街道 (Sanhe Subdistrict)
- 名山街道 (Mingshan Subdistrict)

Twenty-three towns:

- 虎威镇 (Huwei Town)
- 社坛镇 (Shetan Town)
- 三元镇 (Sanyuan Town)
- 许明寺镇 (Xumingshi Town)
- 董家镇 (Dongjia Town)
- 树人镇 (Shuren Town)
- 十直镇 (Shizhi Town)
- 高家镇 (Gaojia Town)
- 兴义镇 (Xingyi Town)
- 双路镇 (Shuanglu Town)
- 江池镇 (Jiangchi Town)
- 龙河镇 (Longhe Town)
- 武平镇 (Wuping Town)
- 包鸾镇 (Baoluan Town)
- 湛普镇 (Zhanpu Town)
- 南天湖镇 (Nantianhu Town)
- 保合镇 (Baohe Town)
- 兴龙镇 (Xinglong Town)
- 仁沙镇 (Rensha Town)
- 龙孔镇 (Longkong Town)
- 暨龙镇 (Jilong Town)
- 双龙镇 (Shuanglong Town)
- 仙女湖镇 (Xiannv Town)

Five townships:

- 青龙乡 (Qinglong Township)
- 太平坝乡 (Taipingba Township)
- 都督乡 (Dudu Township)
- 栗子乡 (Lizi Township)
- 三建乡 (Sanjian Township)

== Wulong District ==
Location of Wulong County in the municipality

Towns:

- 巷口镇 (Xiangkou Town)
- 火炉镇 (Huolu Town)
- 白马镇 (Baima Town)
- 鸭江镇 (Yajiang Town)
- 长坝镇 (Changba Town)
- 江口镇 (Jiangkou Town)
- 平桥镇 (Pingqiao Town)
- 羊角镇 (Yangjiao Town)
- 仙女山镇 (Xiangnvshan Town)
- 桐梓镇 (Tongzhi Town)
- 土坎镇 (Tukan Town)
- 和顺镇 (Heshun Town)

Townships:

- 凤来乡 (Fenglai Township)
- 庙垭乡 (Miaoya Township)
- 双河乡 (Shuanghe Township)
- 黄莺乡 (Huangying Township)
- 沧沟乡 (Canggou Township)
- 土地乡 (Tudi Township)
- 白云乡 (Baiyun Township)
- 接龙乡 (Jielong Township)
- 赵家乡 (Zhaojia Township)
- 铁矿乡 (Tiekuang Township)

Ethnic Townships:

- 石桥苗族土家族乡 (Shiqiaomiaozutujiazu Township)
- 文复苗族土家族乡 (Wenfumiaozutujiazu Township)
- 后坪苗族土家族乡 (Houpingmiaozutujiazu Township)
- 浩口苗族仡佬族乡 (Haokoumiaozugelaozu Township)

== Chengkou County ==
Location of Chengkou County in the municipality

Two subdistricts (街道):

- Gecheng Subdistrict (葛城街道), Fuxing Subdistrict (复兴街道)

Ten towns (镇):

- Bashan (巴山镇), Pingba (坪坝镇), Miaoba (庙坝镇), Mingtong (明通镇), Xiuqi (修齐镇), Gaoguan (高观镇), Gaoyan (高燕镇), Dong'an (东安镇), Xianyi (咸宜镇), Gaonan (高楠镇)

Thirteen townships (乡):

- Longtian Township (龙田乡), Beiping Township (北屏乡), Zuolan Township (左岚乡), Yanhe Township (沿河乡), Shuanghe Township (双河乡), Liaozi Township (蓼子乡), Jiming Township (鸡鸣乡), Zhouxi Township (周溪乡), Mingzhong Township (明中乡), Zhiping Township (治平乡), Lantian Township (岚天乡), Houping Township (厚坪乡), Heyu Township (河鱼乡)

== Fengjie County ==
Location of Fengjie County in the municipality

Subdistricts:

- Yong'an Subdistrict (永安街道), Yufu Subdistrict (鱼复街道), Kuimen Subdistrict (夔门街道)

Towns:

- Baidi (白帝镇), Caotang (草堂镇), Fenhe (汾河镇), Kangle (康乐镇), Dashu (大树镇), Zhuyuan (竹园镇), Gongping (公平镇), Zhuyi (朱衣镇), Jiagao (甲高镇), Yangshi (羊市镇), Tuxiang (吐祥镇), Xinglong (兴隆镇), Qinglong (青龙镇), Xinmin (新民镇), Yongle (永乐镇), Anping (安坪镇), Wuma (五马镇), Qinglian (青莲镇)

Townships:

- Yanwan Township (岩湾乡), Ping'an Township (平安乡), Hongtu Township (红土乡), Shigang Township (石岗乡), Kangping Township (康坪乡), Taihe Tujia Township (太和土家族乡), Hefeng Township (鹤峰乡), Fengping Township (冯坪乡), Chang'an Tujia Township (长安土家族乡), Longqiao Tujia Township (龙桥土家族乡), Yunwu Tujia Township (云雾土家族乡)

== Kaizhou District ==
Location of Kaizhou District in the municipality

Seven subdistricts:

- Hanfeng Subdistrict (汉丰街道), Wenfeng Subdistrict (文峰街道), Yunfeng Subdistrict (云枫街道), Zhendong Subdistrict (镇东街道), Fengle Subdistrict (丰乐街道), Baihe Subdistrict (白鹤街道), Zhaojia Subdistrict (赵家街道)

Twenty six towns:

- Dade (大德镇), Zhen'an (镇安镇), Houba (厚坝镇), Jinfeng (金峰镇), Wenquan (温泉镇), Guojia (郭家镇), Baiqiao (白桥镇), Heqian (和谦镇), Heyan (河堰镇), Dajin (大进镇), Tanjia (谭家镇), Dunhao (敦好镇), Gaoqiao (高桥镇), Jiulongshan (九龙山镇), Tianhe (天和镇), Zhonghe (中和镇), Yihe (义和镇), Linjiang (临江镇), Zhuxi (竹溪镇), Tieqiao (铁桥镇), Nanya (南雅镇), Wushan (巫山镇), Yuexi (岳溪镇), Changsha (长沙镇), Nanmen (南门镇), Qukou (渠口镇)

Seven townships:

- Manyue Township (满月乡), Guanmian Township (关面乡), Baiquan Township (白泉乡), Maliu Township (麻柳乡), Zishui Township (紫水乡), Sanhuikou Township (三汇口乡), Wutong Township (五通乡)

== Liangping District ==
Location of Liangping County in the municipality

Subdistricts:

- 梁山街道 (Liangshan Street)
- 双桂街道 (Shuanggui Street)

Towns:

- 仁贤镇 (Renxian Town)
- 礼让镇 (Lirang Town)
- 云龙镇 (Yunlong Town)
- 屏锦镇 (Pingjin Town)
- 袁驿镇 (Yuanyi Town)
- 新盛镇 (Xinsheng Town)
- 福禄镇 (Fulu Town)
- 金带镇 (Jindai Town)
- 聚奎镇 (Jukui Town)
- 明达镇 (Mingda Town)
- 荫平镇 (Yinping Town)
- 和林镇 (Helin Town)
- 回龙镇 (Huilong Town)
- 碧山镇 (Bishan Town)
- 虎城镇 (Hucheng Town)
- 七星镇 (Qixing Town)
- 龙门镇 (Longmen Town)
- 文化镇 (Wenhua Town)
- 合兴镇 (Hexing Town)
- 石安镇 (Shian Town)
- 柏家镇 (Bojia Town)
- 大观镇 (Daguan Town)
- 竹山镇 (Zhushan Town)
- 蟠龙镇 (Panlong Town)

Townships:

- 安胜乡 (Ansheng Township)
- 铁门乡 (Tiemen Township)
- 龙胜乡 (Longsheng Township)
- 复平乡 (Fuping Township)
- 紫照乡 (Zizhao Township)
- 城北乡 (Chengbei Township)
- 曲水乡 (Qushui Township)

Other township-level: Liangping county Farm 梁平县双桂 Industrial Park

== Wushan County ==
Location of Wushan County in the municipality

Two subdistricts:

- Gaotang Subdistrict (高唐街道), Longmen Subdistrict (龙门街道)

Eleven towns:

- Miaoyu (庙宇镇), Dachang (大昌镇), Futian (福田镇), Longxi (龙溪镇), Shuanglong (双龙镇), Guanyang (官阳镇), Luoping (骡坪镇), Baolong (抱龙镇), Guandu (官渡镇), Tonggu (铜鼓镇), Wuxia (巫峡镇)

Thirteen townships:

- Hongchun Township (红椿土家族乡), Liangping Township (两坪乡), Quchi Township (曲尺乡), Jianping Township (建平乡), Daxi Township (大溪乡), Jinping Township (金坪乡), Pinghe Township (平河乡), Dangyang Township (当阳乡), Zhuxian Township (竹贤乡), Sanxi Township (三溪乡), Peishi Township (培石乡), Duping Township (笃坪乡), Dengjia Township (邓家土家族乡)

== Wuxi County ==
Location of Wuxi County in the municipality

Subdistricts:

- Ninghe Subdistrict (宁河街道), Baiyang Subdistrict (柏杨街道)

Towns:

- Chengxiang (城厢镇), Fenghuang (凤凰镇), Ningchang (宁厂镇), Shanghuang (上磺镇), Gulu (古路镇), Wenfeng (文峰镇), Xujia (徐家镇), Bailu (白鹿镇), Jianshan (尖山镇), Xiabao/bu/pu (下堡镇镇), Fengling (峰灵镇), Tangfang (塘坊镇), Chaoyang (朝阳镇), Tianba (田坝镇), Tongcheng (通城镇), Lingjiao (菱角镇), Pulian (蒲莲镇), Tucheng (土城镇), Hongchiba (红池坝镇)

Townships:

- Shengli Township (胜利乡), Dahe Township (大河乡), Tianxing Township (天星乡), Changgui Township (长桂乡), Yulin Township (鱼鳞乡), Wulong Township (乌龙乡), Huatai Township (花台乡), Lanying Township (兰英乡), Shuangyang Township (双阳乡), Zhongliang Township (中梁乡), Tianyuan Township (天元乡)

Other area:

- Hongchiba Economic Development Area (红池坝经济开发区)

== Yunyang County ==
Location of Yunyang County in the municipality

Subdistricts:

- 双江街道 (Shuangjiang Street)
- 青龙街道 (Qinglong Street)
- 人和街道 (Renhe Street)
- 盘龙街道 (Panlong Street)

Towns:

- 龙角镇 (Longjiao Town)
- 故陵镇 (Guling Town)
- 红狮镇 (Hongshi Town)
- 路阳镇 (Luyang Town)
- 农坝镇 (Nongba Town)
- 渠马镇 (Quma Town)
- 黄石镇 (Huangshi Town)
- 巴阳镇 (Bayang Town)
- 沙市镇 (Shashi Town)
- 鱼泉镇 (Yuquan Town)
- 凤鸣镇 (Fengming Town)
- 宝坪镇 (Baoping Town)
- 南溪镇 (Nanxi Town)
- 双土镇 (Shuangtu Town)
- 桑坪镇 (Sangping Town)
- 江口镇 (Jiangkou Town)
- 高阳镇 (Gaoyang Town)
- 平安镇 (Pingan Town)
- 云阳镇 (Yunyang Town)
- 云安镇 (Yunan Town)
- 栖霞镇 (Qixia Town)
- 双龙镇 (Shuanglong Town)

Townships:

- 外郎乡 (Wailang Township)
- 泥溪乡 (Nixi Township)
- 耀灵乡 (Yaoling Township)
- 票草乡 (Piaocao Township)
- 堰坪乡 (Yanping Township)
- 新津乡 (Xinjin Township)
- 普安乡 (Puan Township)
- 龙洞乡 (Longdong Township)
- 洞鹿乡 (Donglu Township)
- 石门乡 (Shimen Township)
- 大阳乡 (Dayang Township)
- 后叶乡 (Houye Township)
- 养鹿乡 (Yanglu Township)
- 水口乡 (Shuikou Township)
- 上坝乡 (Shangba Township)

Ethnic Township:

- 清水土家族乡 (Qingshuitujiazu Township)

== Zhong County ==
Location of Zhong County in the municipality

Towns:

- 忠州镇 (Zhongzhou Town)
- 新生镇 (Xinsheng Town)
- 任家镇 (Renjia Town)
- 乌杨镇 (Wuyang Town)
- 洋渡镇 (Yangdu Town)
- 东溪镇 (Dongxi Town)
- 复兴镇 (Fuxing Town)
- 石宝镇 (Shibao Town)
- 汝溪镇 (Ruxi Town)
- 野鹤镇 (Yehe Town)
- 官坝镇 (Guanba Town)
- 石黄镇 (Shihuang Town)
- 马灌镇 (Maguan Town)
- 金鸡镇 (Jinji Town)
- 新立镇 (Xinli Town)
- 双桂镇 (Shuanggui Town)
- 拔山镇 (Bashan Town)
- 花桥镇 (Huaqiao Town)
- 永丰镇 (Yangfeng Town)
- 三汇镇 (Sanhui Town)
- 白石镇 (Baishi Town)
- 黄金镇 (Huangjin Town)

Townships:

- 善广乡 (Shanguan Township)
- 石子乡 (Shizi Township)
- 涂井乡 (Tujing Township)
- 金声乡 (Jinsheng Township)
- 兴峰乡 (Xingfeng Township)

Ethnic Townships:

- 磨子土家族乡 (Mozitujiazu Township)

== Pengshui Miao and Tujia Autonomous County ==
Location of Pengshui County in the municipality

Towns:

- 汉葭镇 (Hanjia Town)
- 保家镇 (Baojia Town)
- 郁山镇 (Yushan Town)
- 高谷镇 (Gaogu Town)
- 桑柘镇 (Sangzhe Town)
- 鹿角镇 (Lujiao Town)
- 黄家镇 (Huangjia Town)
- 普子镇 (Puzi Town)
- 龙射镇 (Longshe Town)
- 连湖镇 (Lianhu Town)
- 万足镇 (Wanzu Town)

Townships:

- 靛水乡 (Dianshui Township)
- 岩东乡 (Yandong Township)
- 鹿鸣乡 (Luming Township)
- 平安乡 (Pingan Township)
- 棣棠乡 (Litang Township)
- 太原乡 (Taiyuan Township)
- 三义乡 (Sanyi Township)
- 联合乡 (Lianhe Township)
- 石柳乡 (Shiliu Township)
- 龙溪乡 (Longxi Township)
- 走马乡 (Zouma Township)
- 芦塘乡 (Lutang Township)
- 长滩乡 (Changtan Township)
- 乔梓乡 (Qiaozi Township)
- 迁桥乡 (Qianqiao Township)
- 新田乡 (Xintian Township)
- 梅子垭乡 (Meiziya Township)
- 诸佛乡 (Zhufo Township)
- 小厂乡 (Xiaoguan Township)
- 桐楼乡 (Tonglou Township)
- 鞍子乡 (Anzi Township)
- 善感乡 (Shangan Township)
- 双龙乡 (Shuanglong Township)
- 石盘乡 (Shipan Township)
- 大垭乡 (Daya Township)
- 润溪乡 (Runxi Township)
- 朗溪乡 (Langxi Township)
- 龙塘乡 (Longtang Township)

== Shizhu Tujia Autonomous County ==
Location of Shizhu County in the municipality

Towns:

- 南宾镇 (Nanbin Town)
- 西沱镇 (Xituo Town)
- 下路镇 (Xialu Town)
- 悦崃镇 (Yue Town)
- 临溪镇 (Linxi Town)
- 黄水镇 (Huangshui Town)
- 马武镇 (Mawu Town)
- 沙子镇 (Shazi Town)
- 王场镇 (Wangchang Town)
- 沿溪镇 (Yanxi Town)
- 龙沙镇 (Longsha Town)
- 鱼池镇 (Yuchi Town)
- 三河镇 (Sanhe Town)
- 大歇镇 (Daxie Town)
- 桥头镇 (Qiaotou Town)
- 万朝镇 (Wanchao Town)
- 冷水镇 (Lengshui Town)

Townships:

- 黎场乡 (Lichang Township)
- 三星乡 (Sanxing Township)
- 六塘乡 (Liutang Township)
- 三益乡 (Sanyi Township)
- 王家乡 (Wangjia Township)
- 河嘴乡 (Hezui Township)
- 石家乡 (Shijia Township)
- 枫木乡 (Fengmu Township)
- 中益乡 (Zhongyi Township)
- 洗新乡 (Xixin Township)
- 黄鹤乡 (Huanghe Township)
- 龙潭乡 (Longtan Township)
- 新乐乡 (Xinle Township)
- 金铃乡 (Jinling Township)
- 金竹乡 (Jinzhu Township)

== Xiushan Tujia and Miao Autonomous County ==
Location of Xiushan County in the municipality

Towns:

- 中和镇 (Zhonghe Town)
- 平凯镇 (Pingkai Town)
- 清溪场镇 (Qingxichang Town)
- 隘口镇 (Yikou Town)
- 溶溪镇 (Rongxi Town)
- 官庄镇 (Guangzhuang Town)
- 龙池镇 (Longchi Town)
- 石堤镇 (Shiti Town)
- 峨溶镇 (Errong Town)
- 洪安镇 (Hongan Town)
- 雅江镇 (Yajiang Town)
- 石耶镇 (Shiye Town)
- 梅江镇 (Meijiang Town)
- 兰桥镇 (Lanqiao Town)

Townships:

- 官舟乡 (Guangzhou Township)
- 孝溪乡 (Xiaoxi Township)
- 塘坳乡 (Tangao Township)
- 膏田乡 (Gaotian Township)
- 溪口乡 (Xikou Township)
- 妙泉乡 (Miaoquan Township)
- 宋农乡 (Songnong Township)
- 海洋乡 (Haiyang Township)
- 大溪乡 (Daxi Township)
- 保安乡 (Baoan Township)
- 里仁乡 (Liren Township)
- 涌洞乡 (Yongdong Township)
- 干川乡 (Ganping Township)
- 平马乡 (Pingma Township)
- 中平乡 (Zhongping Township)
- 岑溪乡 (Cenxi Township)
- 钟灵乡 (Zhongling Township)
- 巴家乡 (Bajia Township)

== Youyang Tujia and Miao Autonomous County ==
Location of Youyang County in the municipality

Towns:

- 桃花源镇 (Taohuayuan Town)
- 龙潭镇 (Longtang Town)
- 麻旺镇 (Mawang Town)
- 酉酬镇 (Youchou Town)
- 大溪镇 (Daxi Town)
- 兴隆镇 (Xinglong Town)
- 黑水镇 (Heishui Town)
- 丁市镇 (Dingshi Town)
- 龚滩镇 (Gongtang Town)
- 李溪镇 (Lixi Town)
- 泔溪镇 (Ganxi Town)
- 酉水河镇 (Youshuihe Town)
- 苍岭镇 (Cangling Town)
- 小河镇 (Xiaohe Town)
- 板溪镇 (Banxi Town)

Townships:

- 涂市乡 (Tushi Township)
- 铜鼓乡 (Tonggu Township)
- 可大乡 (Keda Township)
- 偏柏乡 (Pianbo Township)
- 五福乡 (Wufu Township)
- 木叶乡 (Muye Township)
- 毛坝乡 (Maoba Township)
- 花田乡 (Huatian Township)
- 后坪乡 (Houping Township)
- 天馆乡 (Tianguan Township)
- 宜居乡 (Yiju Township)
- 万木乡 (Wanmu Township)
- 两罾乡 (Liangzeng Township)
- 板桥乡 (Banqiao Township)
- 官清乡 (Guangqing Township)
- 南腰界乡 (Nanyaojie Township)
- 车田乡 (Dongtian Township)
- 腴地乡 (Yudi Township)
- 清泉乡 (Qingquan Township)
- 庙溪乡 (Miaoxi Township)
- 浪坪乡 (Langping Township)
- 双泉乡 (Shuanquan Township)
- 楠木乡 (Nanmu Township)
