= Haitang =

Haitang or Hai Tang may refer to:

- Malus spectabilis or haitang, a flowering tree native to China
- Hai-Tang, 1930 British-German drama film

== Places in China ==
- Haitang Bay, in Sanya, Hainan
- Haitang District, Sanya
- Haitang, Chongqing
- Haitang, Ganluo County, Sichuan
- Haitang Subdistrict, Hefei, Anhui
- Haitang Subdistrict, Leshan, Sichuan

== See also ==
- List of storms named Haitang, tropical cyclones named Haitang
