= Yunji =

Yunji may refer to:

- Yunji, Hamadan, a village in Hamadan Province, Iran
- Yunji, Chongqing (云集镇), a town in Changshou District, Chongqing, China
- Yunji, Hunan (云集镇), a town in Hengyang County, Hunan, China
- Yunji Township (云集乡), Jiangyou, Sichuan, China
- Yunji Subdistrict (云集街道), Xiling District, Yichang, Hubei, China
