= Changshou Lake =

Reservoir in Chongqing, China

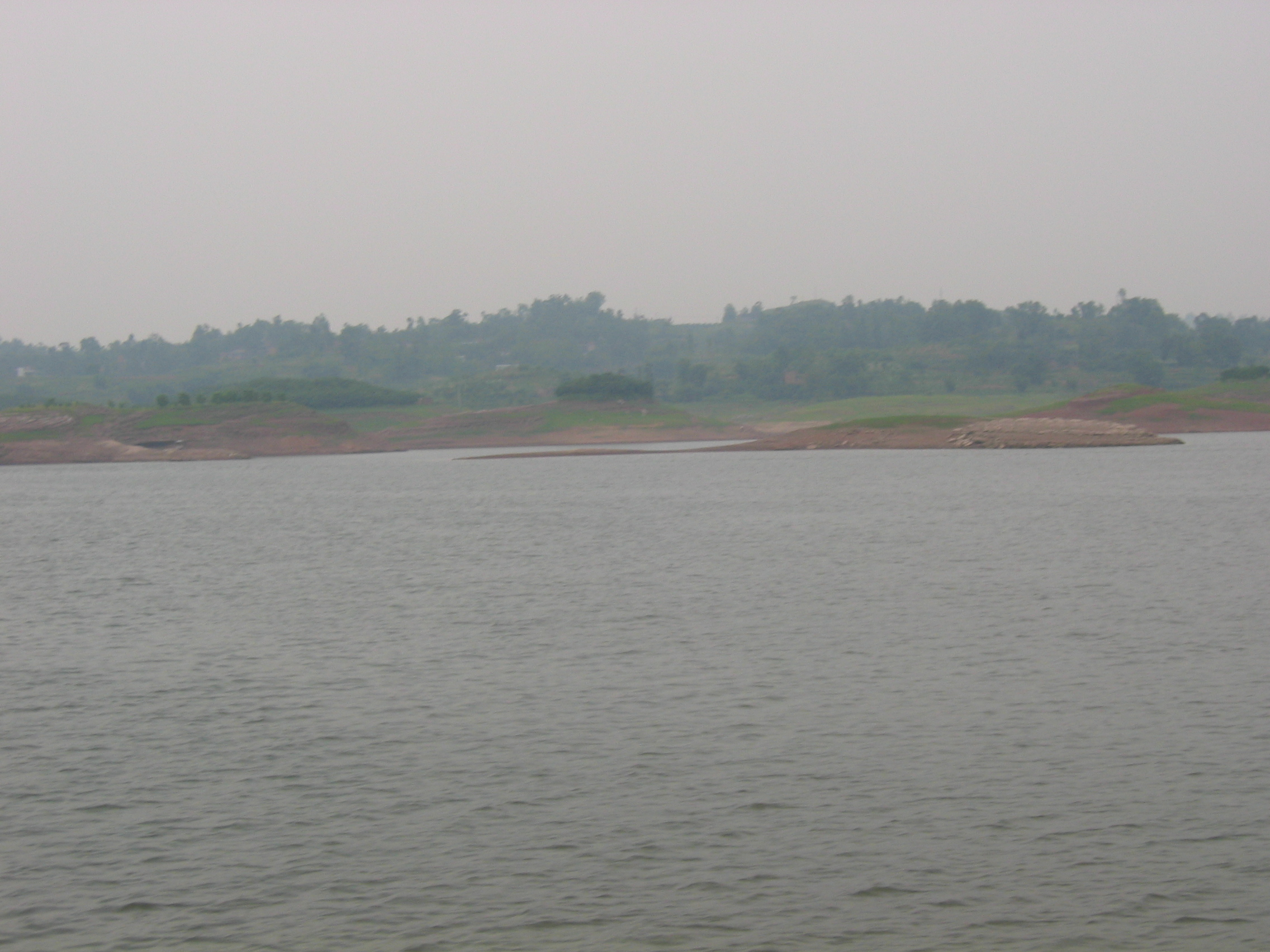

- Location within Chongqing
- Location: Changshou District, Chongqing
- Coordinates: 29°54′23″N 107°15′04″E
- Type: reservoir
- Basin countries: China
- Surface area: 60 km^{2} (23 sq mi)

Changshou Lake (simplified Chinese: 长寿湖; traditional Chinese: 長壽湖; pinyin: Chángshòu Hú) or Shizitan Reservoir (Chinese: 狮子滩水库; pinyin: Shīzǐtān Shuǐkù; lit. 'Lion Beach Reservoir') in Changshou District, Chongqing, China. In the purpose of generating electric power, four hydraulic power stations were built after the dam construction had been completed in the 1950s. Since then a state farm was set up for fishery and horticulture as well as animal husbandry. Its surface area is 60 km^{2} with an irrigation area amounting to 248 km^{2}. There are many islands within the lake, good for tourism.

== See also ==
- Changshouhu railway station, named after the lake
