= Changshou North railway station =

Railway station in Chongqing, China

Coordinates: 29.8832°N 107.0699°E

Changshou North 长寿北
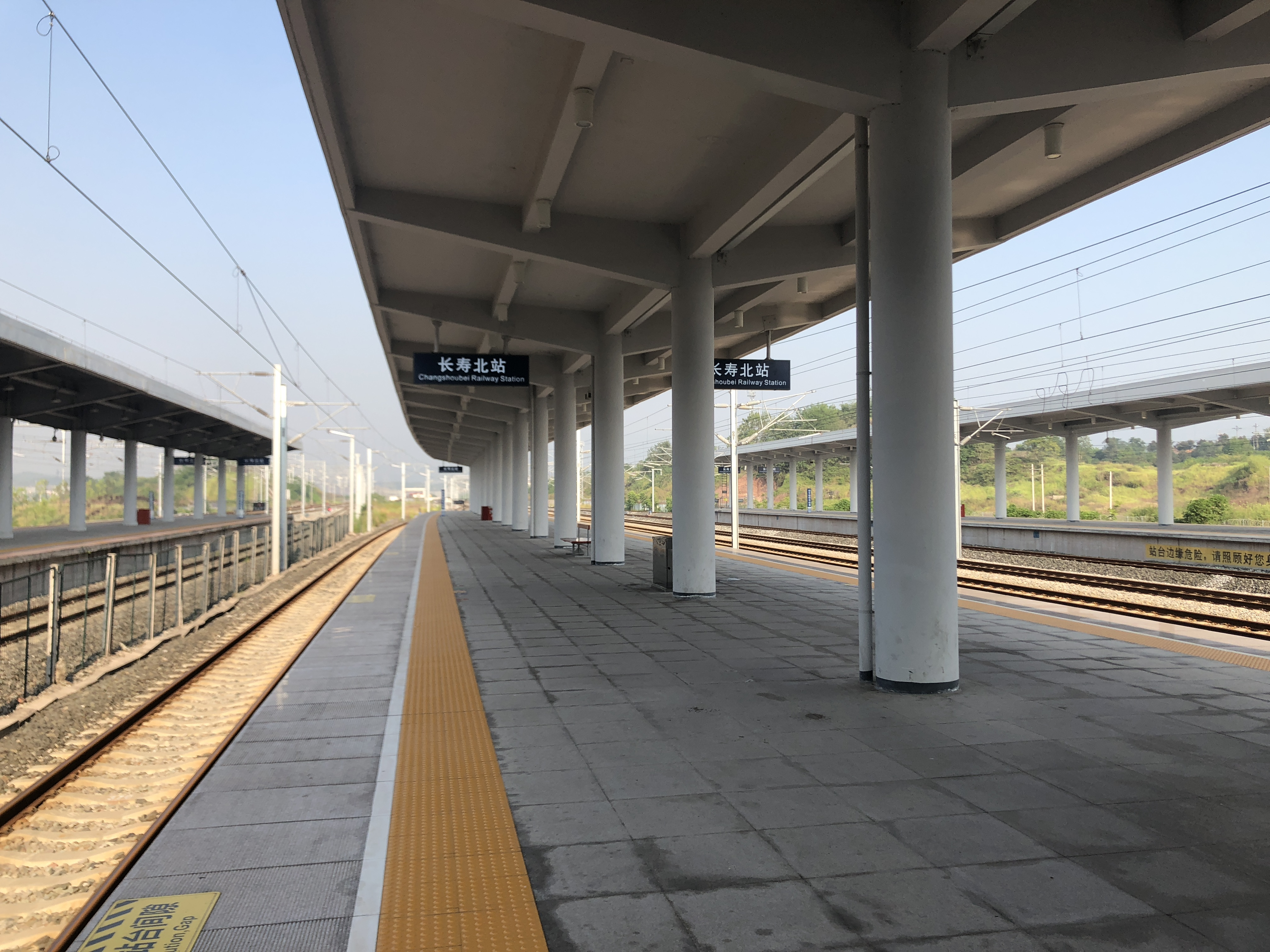

General information
- Other names: Changshoubei
- Location: Changshou District, Chongqing; China
- Operated by: China Railway Chengdu Group
- Lines: Chongqing−Lichuan railway Chongqing–Wanzhou intercity railway
Location

Changshou North railway station (Chinese: 长寿北站) is a railway station located in Changshou District, Chongqing, People's Republic of China. It is on the Chongqing−Lichuan railway and Chongqing–Wanzhou intercity railway which is operated by China Railway Chengdu Group.

Preceding station	China Railway High-speed	Following station
Fusheng towards Chongqing North	Chongqing–Wanzhou intercity railway	Changshouhu towards Wanzhou North
Fusheng towards Chongqing North	Chongqing–Lichuan railway	Fuling North towards Lichuan
