= Changshouhu railway station =

Railway station in Chongqing, China

Changshouhu 长寿湖
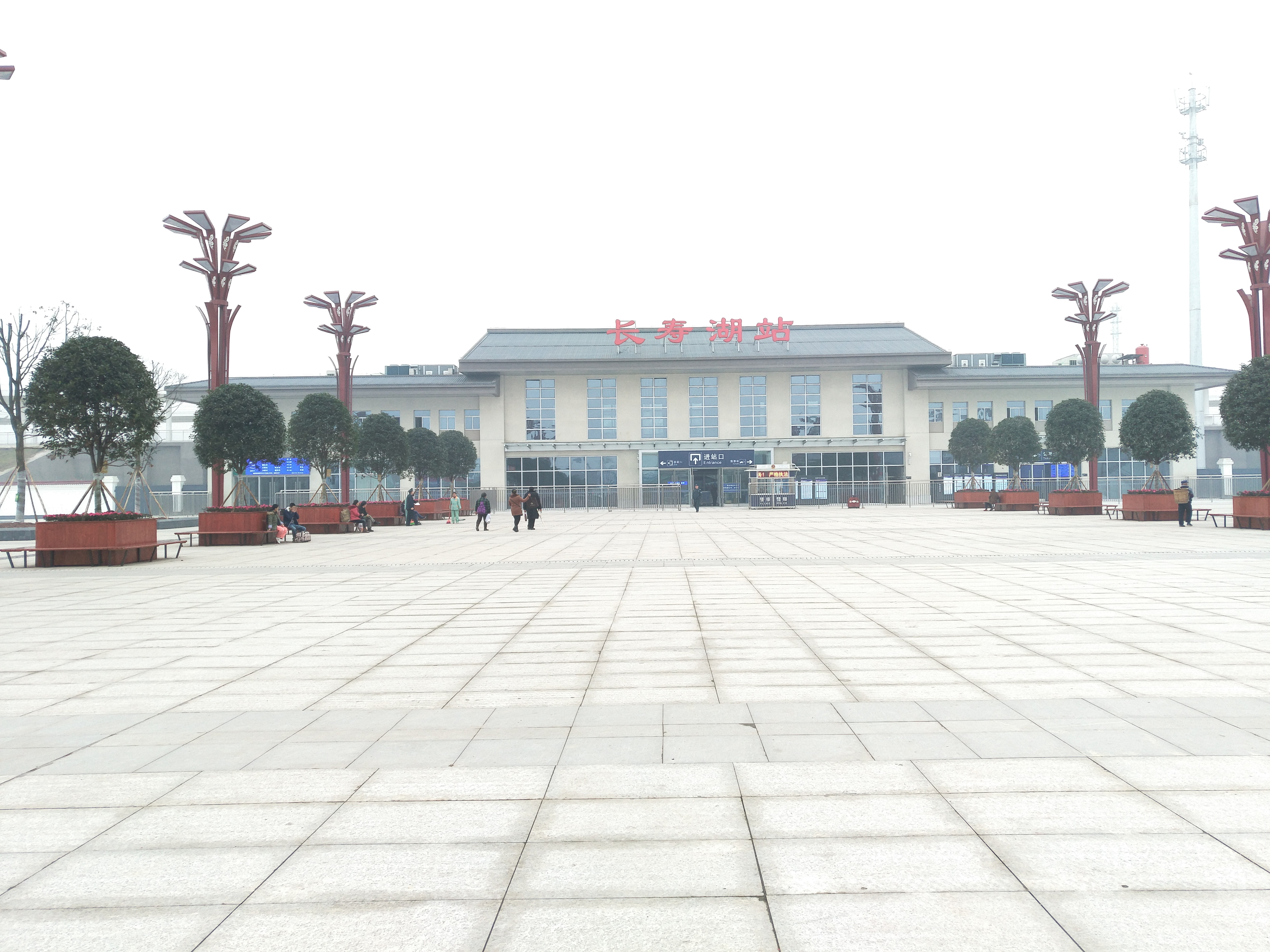
- Front View of Changshouhu railway station.

General information
- Location: Shuanglong, Changshou District, Chongqing; China
- Coordinates: 29°57′56″N 107°12′16″E
- Operator: China Railway Chengdu Group
- Line: Chongqing–Wanzhou intercity railway
- Platforms: 2

History
- Opened: 28 November 2016
Location
- Location within Chongqing

Changshouhu railway station (simplified Chinese: 长寿湖站; traditional Chinese: 長壽湖站; pinyin: Chángshòuhú Zhán; lit. 'Changshou Lake railway station') is a railway station located in Changshou District, Chongqing, on the Chongqing–Wanzhou intercity railway operated by China Railway Chengdu Group.

== History ==
The Changshouhu railway station opened on November 28, 2016.

Preceding station	China Railway High-speed	Following station
Changshou North towards Chongqing North	Chongqing–Wanzhou intercity railway	Dianjiang towards Wanzhou North
