= Lin Feng =

Lin Feng may refer to:

== People ==
- Lim Hong (pirate), a famous Chinese pirate in the 16th century of Philippines history
- Lin Feng (chess), former President of the Chinese Chess Association
- Lin Feng (politician), former President of the Central Party School of the Chinese Communist Party
- Raymond Lam (born 1979), Hong Kong actor

== Places ==
- Linfeng, Chongqing, a town in China

== Other uses ==
- Lin Feng (comics), a Marvel Comics character
