= Yuquan, Chongqing =

Yuquan 鱼泉镇
- Town
- Location in Chongqing
- Coordinates: 31°17′17″N 108°51′1″E
- Country: People's Republic of China
- Direct-administered municipality: Chongqing
- County: Yunyang County
- Time zone: UTC+8 (China Standard)

Yuquan (Chinese: 鱼泉; pinyin: Yúquán) is a town in Yunyang County, Chongqing, China. As of 2020, it administers Yuquan Residential Community and the following 12 villages:

- Macao Village (马槽村)
- Yanzi Village (燕子村)
- Longwan Village (龙湾村)
- Baiguo Village (白果村)
- Hualou Village (花楼村)
- Jianping Village (建坪村)
- Luming Village (鹿鸣村)
- Wanglu Village (望鹿村)
- Cigu Village (茨菇村)
- Bayi Village (八一村)
- Mugua Village (木瓜村)
- Sanxing Village (三星村)

== See also ==
- List of township-level divisions of Chongqing
