= Longhe, Chongqing =

Longhe Town
- Town

Chinese transcription(s)
  - Simplified: 龙河镇
  - Traditional: 龍河鎮
  - Pinyin: Lónghé Zhèn
- Location in China
- Coordinates: 30°00′34″N 107°13′06″E
- Country: People's Republic of China
- City: Chongqing
- district: Changshou District

Area
  - Total: 89.9 km^{2} (34.7 sq mi)

Population
  - Total: 48,000
  - Density: 530/km^{2} (1,400/sq mi)
- Time zone: UTC+8 (China Standard)
- Postal code: 401244
- Area code: 023

Longhe Town (simplified Chinese: 龙河镇; traditional Chinese: 龍河鎮; pinyin: Lónghé Zhèn) is an urban town in Changshou District, Chongqing, People's Republic of China.

== Administrative divisions ==
The town is divided into 17 villages, which include the following areas: Yongxing Village, Renhe Village, Siping Village, Taihe Village, Xianfeng Village, Yantang Village, Hexing Village, Yanjingdang Village, Mingfeng Village, Jiulong Village, Baohe Village, Chang'an Village, Longhe Village, Jinming Village, Heyan Village, Qilong Village, and Mingxing Village (永兴村、仁和村、四坪村、太和村、咸丰村、堰塘村、合兴村、盐井凼村、明丰村、九龙村、保合村、长安村、龙河村、金明村、河堰村、骑龙村、明星村).

== See also ==
- List of township-level divisions of Chongqing
