= Mount Puti =

Mountain in the country of China

- 菩提山
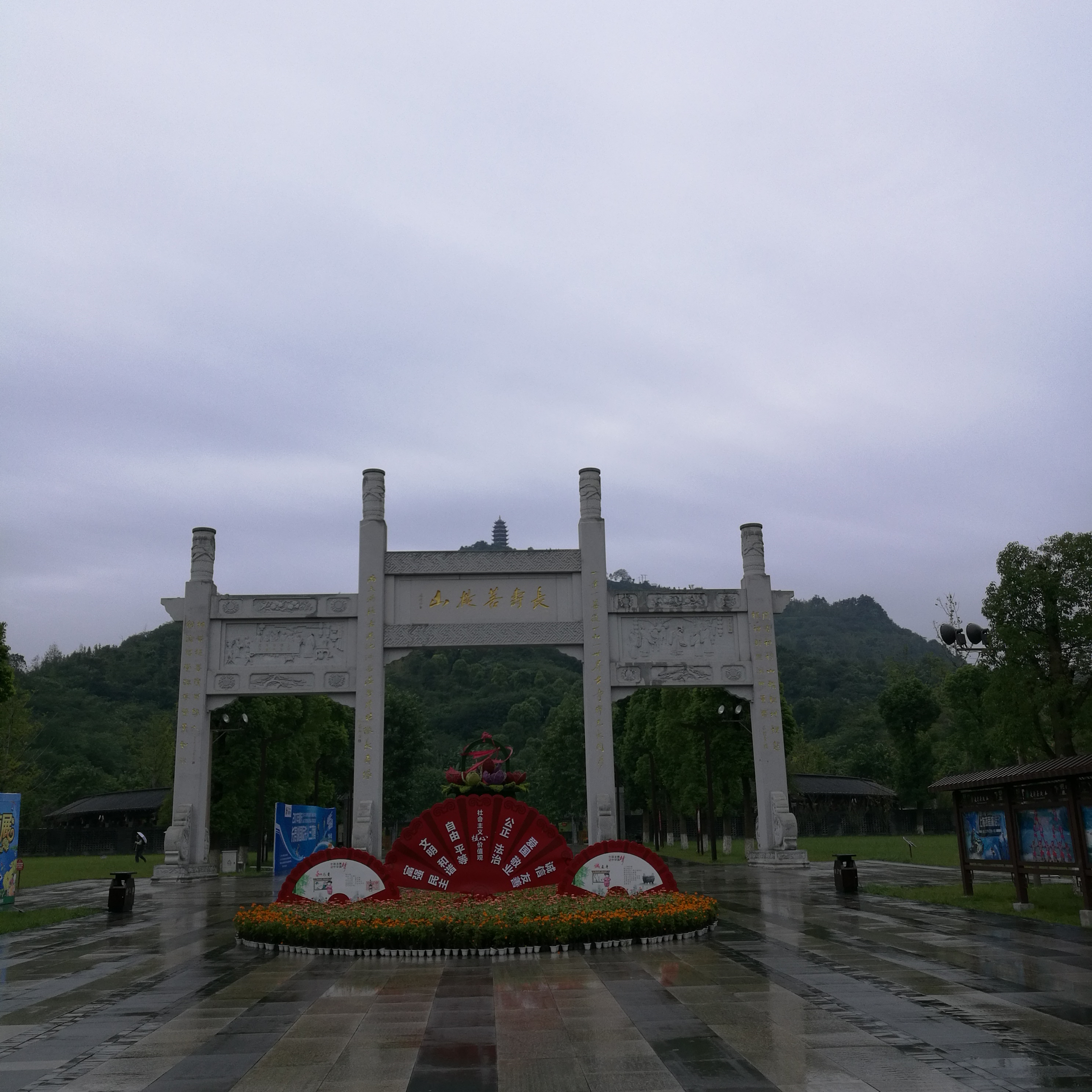
- Entrance of Mount Puti.

Highest point
- Elevation: 598 m (1,962 ft)
- Prominence: 598 m (1,962 ft)
- Coordinates: 29°52′23″N 107°03′36″E

Geography
- Location within Chongqing
- Country: China
- Province: Chongqing

Geology
- Rock type: Granite

Mount Puti (Chinese: 菩提山; pinyin: Pútí Shān), also known as Mount Jing (Chinese: 晶山; pinyin: Jīng Shān) is a mountain located in Changshou District of Chongqing, China, with a height of 598 metres (1,962 ft) above sea level.

== History ==
According to the Changshou County Annals (《长寿县志》), the mountain is named after Bodhidharma, the Indian Buddhist monk who disseminated Buddhism in ancient China.

In 1507, during the Zhengde period (1506-1522) of Ming dynasty (1368-1644), Dai Jin (戴锦), a jinshi in Changshou County, renamed it as Mount Jing.

It has been categorized as a AAAA-level tourist site by the China National Tourism Administration in May 2017.

== Attractions ==
Mount Puti is noted for Puti Temple, a Buddhist temple located on the top of the mountain, it was first construction in the Northern Song dynasty (960-1127) and rebuilt many times. The present temple was reconstructed in October 2014, the complex includes the following halls: Shanmen, Mahavira Hall, Hall of Four Heavenly Kings, Hall of Guanyin, Bell tower, Drum tower, Founder's Hall, Buddhist Texts Library, Dharma Hall, Dining Room, etc.

The Puti Lantern is a famous scenic spot in the mountain. It was first built in the Ming dynasty (1368-1644) and rebuilt in October 2014, with a height of 37.5 metres (123 ft).

The Wanshou Stone Stairs is a tourist attraction on the mountain. It has 1,567 steps and 19,999 patterns of Chinese character "寿".

== Gallery ==
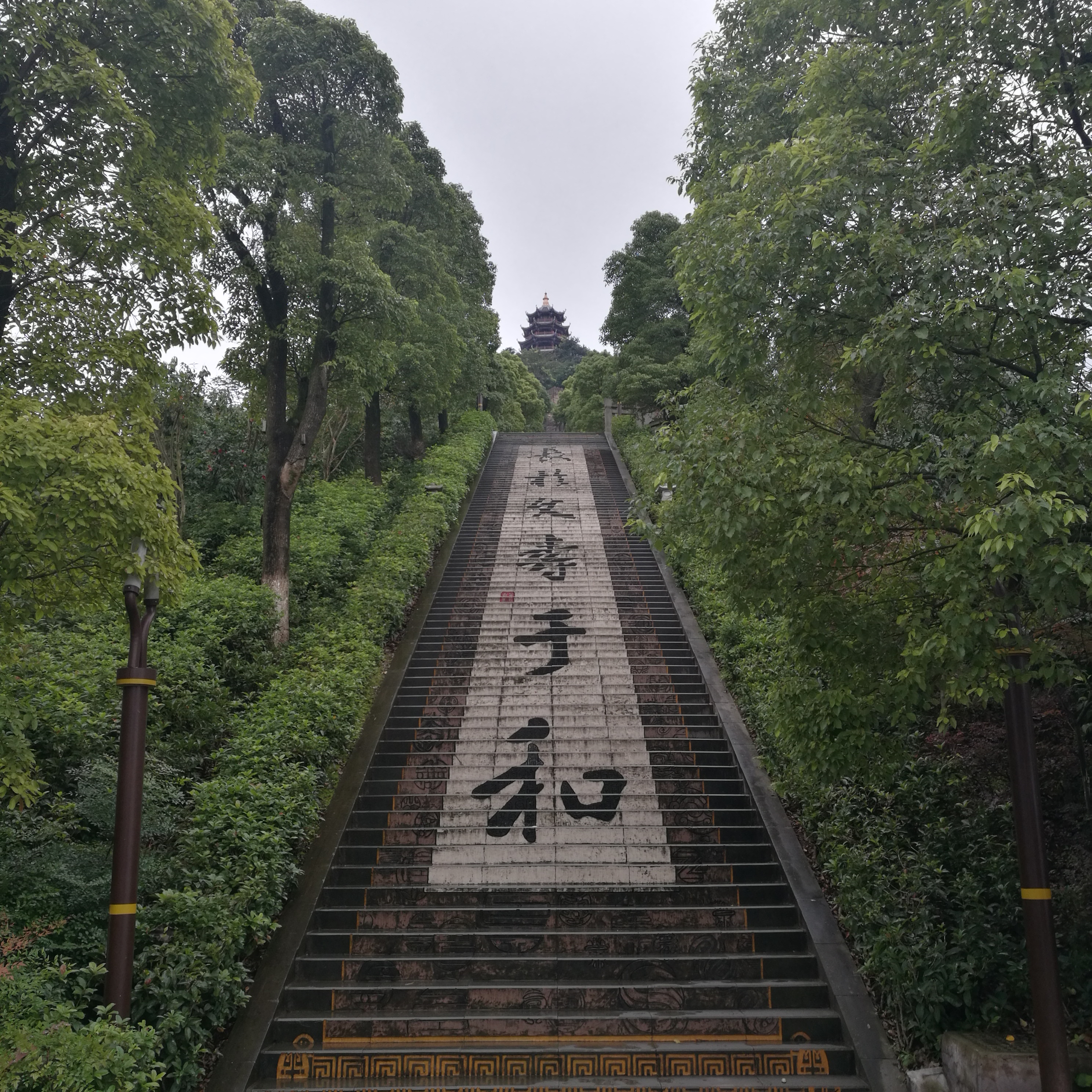
The Wanshou Stone Stairs on Mount Puti.
