= Changshou Yangtze River Bridge =

Changshou Yangtze River Bridge 重庆长寿长江大桥
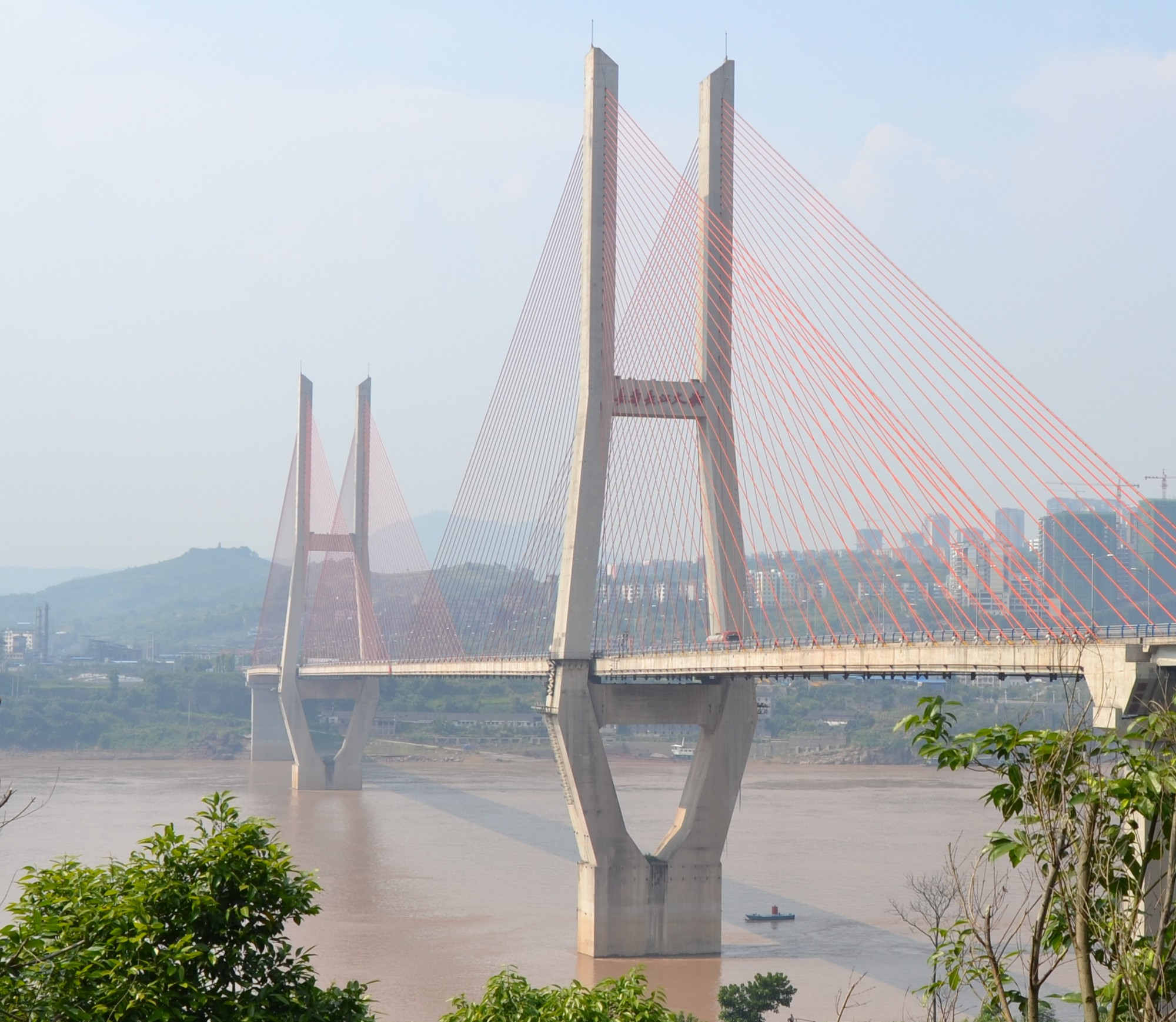
- Coordinates: 29.816444°N 107.057028°E
- Crosses: Yangtze River
- Locale: Changshou, Chongqing, China

Characteristics
- Design: Cable-stayed
- Material: Steel/concrete
- Total length: 1,160 metres (3,810 ft)
- Longest span: 460 metres (1,510 ft)

History
- Opened: 2009

Location
- Interactive map of Changshou Yangtze River Bridge

The Changshou Yangtze River Bridge is a cable-stayed bridge over the Yangtze River in the Changshou District of Chongqing, China.

Bridge construction began in 2005 and the bridge was completed in 2009. The bridge has a main span of 460 metres (1,510 ft), placing it among the longest cable-stayed bridges in the world.

== See also ==
- List of largest cable-stayed bridges
- Yangtze River bridges and tunnels
