= Guling, Chongqing =

Guling 故陵镇
- Town
- Location in Chongqing
- Coordinates: 30°56′38″N 109°4′56″E
- Country: People's Republic of China
- Direct-administered municipality: Chongqing
- County: Yunyang County
- Time zone: UTC+8 (China Standard)

Guling (Chinese: 故陵) is a town of Yunyang County, Chongqing, China. As of 2018, it has one residential community and 7 villages under its administration.

== See also ==
- List of township-level divisions of Chongqing
