= Baizi =

Tongnan Baizi 潼南柏梓镇
- Town
- Location in China
- Coordinates: 30.09468°N 105.71304°E
- Country: China
- Municipality: Chongqing

Area
  - Total: 134.75 km^{2} (52.03 sq mi)

Population
  - Total: 87,000 (2,010)
- Time zone: UTC+8 (China Standard Time)
- Postal code: 402660
- Area code: 023

Tongnan Baizi (sometimes mistakenly called Bozi) is a town in Chongqing, China. It consists of wide streets and private farms. It was built in the early Song dynasty, making it one of the oldest towns in the world.

== Location ==
The town is located 15 kilometres (9.3 mi) from Tongnan. It takes 40 minutes to arrive in Suining. It is located in the annular structural unit of the Long Nu Temple in the upper Yangtze Platform, Sichuan Zhongtai Au, and Sichuan Zhongtai Arch. It has an altitude of 234–263.2 metres (768–864 ft). The fertile pure soil accounts for 80% arable land since it is next to a river.

=== Land resources ===
Baizi includes 116,895 acres (47,306 ha) of arable land. Of the land, 62,305 acres (25,214 ha) are used for agriculture and 54,590 acres (22,090 ha) of soil. The soil consists of 1.35% organic matter and 2.55% of potassium.

=== Water resources ===
The Yangtze runs in the town for 10 kilometres (6.2 mi). It has an annual runoff of 84,000 cubic metres (3,000,000 cu ft). Along with the river, residents can rely on ponds and creeks that are usually safe to drink. However, as of December 2016 the creeks and the ponds are now contaminated with mud and pollution.

== Economy ==
The town has a total social fixed assets investment of 487 million yuan with an increase of 32%. The total retail sales are 14.84 billion yuan. The per capita net income of farmers grew to 12,260 yuan which is an increase of 18%. The town makes most of its money through agriculture. The town has a few hotels and stores.

=== Leadership and laws ===
Leadership is led by two men: Hu Guangjian and Liu Ming who were born in 1969 and 1964 respectively. Liu Ming is currently the mayor of Tongnan. It is legal to use and buy firecrackers and fireworks which are only limited to the country.

== Education ==
Baizi has a middle school and an elementary school. The middle school was built around 1930 and is close to a lake. Both schools got new refurbishments. The middle school originally consisted of one building and one dorm but has increased. The elementary school has upgraded technology.

== Climate ==
The town has a mixed climate, with monsoons and sunshine. The average temperature is 17.9 °C (64.2 °F). The coldest month is January with an average temperature of 7 °C (45 °F) and the coldest temperature of −3.8 °C (25.2 °F). The average frost period is 5.5 days. There is an annual average of 1228.4 hours of sunshine and an average rainfall of 990 millimetres (39 in).

== Cases ==
In 2013, heavy rainstorms flooded the town. Approximately 18,000 people were evacuated. The monsoon season began in 2010. In 2010, 12,300 people were rescued in Baizi and two other towns. Baizi received 56 millimetres (2.2 in) of rainfall and the floodwater destroyed 128 houses. This inflicted an economic loss of 13.8 million yuan. The Tongnan County government reported at least 600 residents were trapped in the three towns.

== See also ==
- List of township-level divisions of Chongqing
