= Huilong, Liangping County =

Huilong 回龙镇
- Town
- Location in Chongqing
- Coordinates: 30°32′00″N 107°29′00″E
- Country: People's Republic of China
- Municipality: Chongqing
- County: Liangping
- Village-level divisions: 1 residential community 15 villages
- Elevation: 421 m (1,381 ft)
- Time zone: UTC+8 (China Standard)
- Area code: 0023

Huilong (simplified Chinese: 回龙; traditional Chinese: 回龍; pinyin: Huílóng) is a town of southwestern Liangping County in northeastern Chongqing Municipality, People's Republic of China, situated near the border with Sichuan and located 33 kilometres (21 mi) southwest of the county seat and 138 km (86 mi) northeast of downtown Chongqing. As of 2011, it has one residential community (社区) and 15 villages under its administration.

== See also ==
- List of township-level divisions of Chongqing
