= Gelan, Chongqing =

Gelan Town
- Town

Chinese transcription(s)
  - Simplified: 葛兰镇
  - Traditional: 葛蘭鎮
  - Pinyin: Gélán Zhèn
- Location in China
- Coordinates: 30°02′00″N 107°06′52″E
- Country: People's Republic of China
- City: Chongqing
- district: Changshou District

Area
  - Total: 110.9 km^{2} (42.8 sq mi)

Population
  - Total: 72,000
  - Density: 650/km^{2} (1,700/sq mi)
- Time zone: UTC+8 (China Standard)
- Area code: 023

Gelan Town (simplified Chinese: 葛兰镇; traditional Chinese: 葛蘭鎮; pinyin: Gélán Zhèn) is an urban town in Changshou District, Chongqing, People's Republic of China.

== Administrative divisions ==
The town is divided into 21 villages and 1 community, which include the following areas: Gelanqiao Community, Wanqiu Village, Baiyun Village, Fengzhuang Village, Luoyan Village, Huangjiaba Village, Yanjing Village, Tiantai Village, Tianbao Village, Daba Village, Tangba Village, Yanbo Village, Tongguan Village, Tianfu Village, Shahe Village, Nanzhong Village, Jinshan Village, Gelan Village, Kujing Village, Longjingkan Village, Lanxing Village, and Zhonghua Village (葛兰桥社区、湾丘村、白云村、冯庄村、罗岩村、黄家坝村、盐井村、天台村、天宝村、大坝村、塘坝村、烟坡村、潼观村、天福村、沙河村、南中村、金山村、葛兰村、枯井村、龙井坎村、兰兴村、中华村).

== See also ==
- List of township-level divisions of Chongqing
