= Fengcheng, Chongqing =

Fengcheng Subdistrict
- Subdistrict

Chinese transcription(s)
  - Simplified: 凤城街道
  - Traditional: 鳳城街道
  - Pinyin: Fèngchéng Jiēdào
- Location in China
- Coordinates: 29°49′37″N 107°03′43″E
- Country: People's Republic of China
- City: Chongqing
- district: Changshou District

Area
  - Total: 72.7 km^{2} (28.1 sq mi)

Population
  - Total: 166,000
  - Density: 2,280/km^{2} (5,910/sq mi)
- Time zone: UTC+8 (China Standard)
- Postal code: 401256
- Area code: 023

Fengcheng Subdistrict (simplified Chinese: 凤城街道; traditional Chinese: 鳳城街道; pinyin: Fèngchéng Jiēdào) is a subdistrict in Changshou District, Chongqing, People's Republic of China.

== Administrative divisions ==
The subdistrict is divided into 14 villages and 10 communities:

- Taohua Community
- Qi'an Community
- Xiangyanglu Community
- Fengling Community
- Wangjianglu Community
- Sanxialu Community
- Qinghualu Community
- Binjianglu Community
- Dongjie Community
- Fuyuan Village
- Yongfeng Village
- Changfeng Village
- Zouma Village
- Dongxin Village
- Honghua Village
- anghe Village
- ongbai Village
- Huangjin Village
- Sandong Village
- Lingyuan Village
- Guotan Village
- Gufo Village
- Baimiao Village

== See also ==
- List of township-level divisions of Chongqing
