= Yanjia, Chongqing =

Yanjia Subdistrict
- Subdistrict

Chinese transcription(s)
  - Simplified: 晏家街道
  - Traditional: 晏家街道
  - Pinyin: Yànjiā Jiēdào
- Location in China
- Coordinates: 29°49′30″N 107°00′08″E
- Country: People's Republic of China
- City: Chongqing
- district: Changshou District

Area
  - Total: 95 km^{2} (37 sq mi)

Population
  - Total: 100,000
  - Density: 1,100/km^{2} (2,700/sq mi)
- Time zone: UTC+8 (China Standard)
- Postal code: 401221
- Area code: 023

Yanjia Town (Chinese: 晏家街道; pinyin: Yànjiā Jiēdào) is a subdistrict in Changshou District, Chongqing, People's Republic of China.

== Administrative divisions ==
The subdistrict is divided into 9 villages and 7 community, which include the following areas: Zhongxinlu Community, Zhajiawan Community, Zhujiayan Community, Yanxing Community, Caojiabao Community, Yanzhonglu Community, Yanjia Community, Shipan Community, Shimen Community, Shaxi Village, Shatang Village, Baishi Village, Jinlong Village, Longmen Village, Shizi Village, and Sanguan Village (中心路社区、查家湾社区、朱家岩社区、晏兴社区、曹家堡社区、晏中路社区、晏家社区、石盘村、石门村、沙溪村、沙塘村、白石村、金龙村、龙门村、十字村、三观村).

== See also ==
- List of township-level divisions of Chongqing
