= Chengbei Township, Chongqing =

Chengbei Township 城北乡
- Township
- Location in Chongqing
- Coordinates: 30°43′16″N 107°47′09″E
- Country: People's Republic of China
- Municipality: Chongqing
- County: Liangping
- Village-level divisions: 8 villages
- Elevation: 451 m (1,480 ft)
- Time zone: UTC+8 (China Standard)

Chengbei (Chinese: 城北; pinyin: Chéngběi; lit. 'city north') is a township of Liangping County in northern Chongqing Municipality, People's Republic of China, located about 5 kilometres (3.1 mi) north of the county seat as its name suggests. As of 2011, it has 8 villages under its administration.

== See also ==
- List of township-level divisions of Chongqing
