= Yuntai, Chongqing =

Yuntai Town
- Town

Chinese transcription(s)
  - Simplified: 云台镇
  - Traditional: 雲臺鎮
  - Pinyin: Yúntái Zhèn
- Location in China
- Coordinates: 30°08′19″N 107°12′11″E
- Country: People's Republic of China
- City: Chongqing
- district: Changshou District

Area
  - Total: 101.78 km^{2} (39.30 sq mi)

Population
  - Total: 51,000
  - Density: 500/km^{2} (1,300/sq mi)
- Time zone: UTC+8 (China Standard)
- Area code: 023

Yuntai Town (simplified Chinese: 云台镇; traditional Chinese: 雲臺鎮; pinyin: Yúntái Zhèn) is an urban town in Changshou District, Chongqing, People's Republic of China.

== Administrative divisions ==
The town is divided into 13 villages and 1 community, which include the following areas: Yuntai Community, Bazi Village, Zhaikou Village, Xiaoyan Village, Anping Village, Bajiao Village, Limin Village, Qiaoba Village, Gongqiao Village, Huangge Village, Yingzhu Village, Qingyun Village, Meituo Village, and Liyu Village (云台社区、八字村、寨口村、小岩村、安坪村、八角村、利民村、桥坝村、拱桥村、黄葛村、应祝村、青云村、梅沱村、鲤鱼村).

== See also ==
- List of township-level divisions of Chongqing
