= Nanxi, Chongqing =

Nanxi 南溪镇
- Town
- Location in Chongqing
- Coordinates: 31°07′22″N 108°50′26″E
- Country: People's Republic of China
- Direct-administered Municipality: Chongqing
- County: Yunyang County
- Time zone: UTC+8 (China Standard)

Nanxi (Chinese: 南溪; pinyin: Nánxī) is a town in Yunyang County, Chongqing, China. As of 2020, it had five residential neighborhoods and 29 villages under its administration.

Neighborhoods

- Nanxi Community
- Shuishi Community (水市社区)
- Changhong Community (长洪社区)
- Xinyang Community (新阳社区)
- Weixing Community (卫星社区)

Villages

- Huaguo Village (花果村)
- Jinyin Village (金银村)
- Shuishi Village (水市村)
- Tianhe Village (天河村)
- Huomai Village (火脉村)
- Qingyun Village (青云村)
- Fangjia Village (方家村)
- Guixi Village (桂溪村)
- Qingyin Village (青印村)
- Jixian Village (吉仙村)
- Yanqu Village (盐渠村)
- Hongyan Village (红岩村)
- Gongqiao Village (拱桥村)
- Daji Village (大吉村)
- Xilin Village (西林村)
- Fuqiao Village (福桥村)
- Pushan Village (蒲山村)
- Xiyun Village (西云村)
- Xinyang Village (新阳村)
- Tapeng Village (塔棚村)
- Nanmu Village (南木村)
- Huanggao Village (黄高村)
- Yandong Village (盐东村)
- Fujia Village (富家村)
- Shiqu Village (石渠村)
- Qingshan Village (青山村)
- Mao'erliang Village (猫儿梁村)
- Hongshi Village (宏实村)
- Ping'an Village (平安村)

== See also ==
- List of township-level divisions of Chongqing
