= Xinshi, Chongqing =

Xinshi 新市镇
- Town
- Location in Chongqing
- Coordinates: 29°57′25″N 107°06′52″E
- Country: People's Republic of China
- Municipality: Chongqing
- District: Changshou
- Village-level divisions: 8 villages
- Elevation: 368 m (1,207 ft)
- Time zone: UTC+8 (China Standard)
- Postal code: 401233
- Area code: 0023

Xinshi (Chinese: 新市; pinyin: Xīnshì; lit. 'new city') is a town of west-central Changshou District in Chongqing Municipality, People's Republic of China, located 67 kilometres (42 mi) northeast of central Chongqing. As of 2011, it has eight villages under its administration.

== Administrative divisions ==
The town is divided into 8 villages, which include the following areas: Hongtudi Village, Heshijing Village, Xinhe Village, Xintong Village, Xinshi Village, Dongmen Village, Yan'ertuo Village, and Huimin Village (红土地村、河石井村、新合村、新同村、新市村、东门村、堰耳沱村、惠民村).

== See also ==
- List of township-level divisions of Chongqing
