= Zhangjiachuan Hui Autonomous County =

Zhangjiachuan Hui Autonomous County 张家川回族自治县 · جْاکِاچُوًا خُوِذُو ذِجِشِیًا
- Autonomous county
- 张家川回族自治县
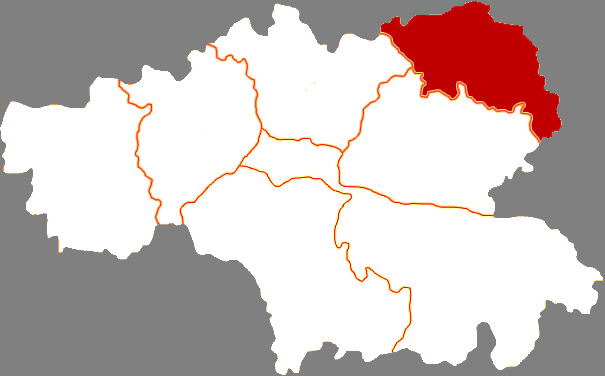
- Zhangjiachuan in Tianshui

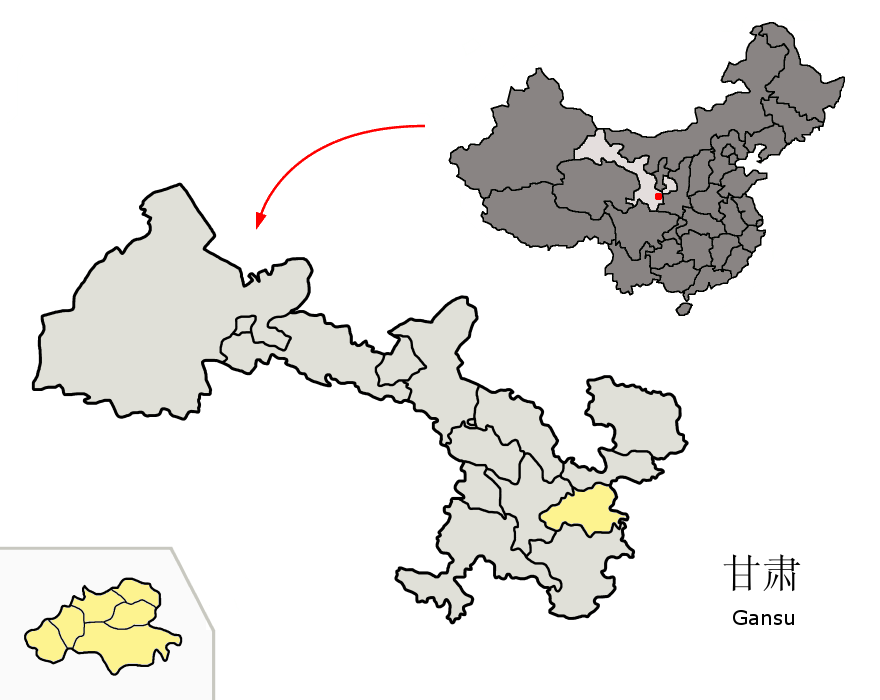
- Tianshui in Gansu

- Location in Gansu
- Coordinates: 34°59′19″N 106°12′18″E
- Country: China
- Province: Gansu
- Prefecture-level city: Tianshui
- District seat: Zhangjiachuan Town

Area
  - Total: 1,311.8 km^{2} (506.5 sq mi)

Population (2020 census)
  - Total: 244,406
  - Density: 186.31/km^{2} (482.55/sq mi)
- Time zone: UTC+8 (China Standard)
- Postal code: 741500
- Website: www.zjc.gov.cn

The Zhangjiachuan Hui Autonomous County (simplified Chinese: 张家川回族自治县; traditional Chinese: 張家川回族自治縣; pinyin: Zhāngjiāchuān Huízú Zìzhìxiàn, Xiao'erjing: جْاکِاچُوًا خُوِذُو ذِجِشِیًا) is an autonomous county in the east of Gansu Province of the People's Republic of China, bordering Shaanxi Province to the east. It is under the administration of the prefecture-level city of Tianshui. Its postal code is 741500, and in 1999 its population was 299,277 people.

Zhuangjiachuan County has significant iron, lead, copper and zinc ore deposits, some of which are being mined. After nine consecutive years of ecological surplus, Zhangjiachuan's water resources shifted to an ecological deficit in 2023.

== History ==
The county's area has been inhabited as early as during the Xirong people era. In 2006, the Majiayuan site was discovered, a Warring States period cemetery.

In 1863, during the Dungan Revolt, Zhangjiachuan was subject of a fierce battle between the Qing army and the Hui defendants.

Thousands of Hui refugees expelled from Shaanxi during the revolt and their descendants settled (who were refused the right to return by the Qing) and their descendants today continue to live in Zhangjiachuan.

== Culture ==
People from Zhangjiachuan are noted for opening Lanzhou beef noodle restaurants throughout China, over 18,900 of China's beef noodle restaurants are operated by people originating from this region.

== Administrative divisions ==
Zhangjiachuan Hui Autonomous County is divided to 10 towns and 5 townships.

Towns

- Zhangjiachuan (张家川镇)
- Longshan (龙山镇)
- Gongmen (恭门镇)
- Malu (马鹿镇)
- Liangshan (梁山镇)
- Maguan (马关镇)
- Liubao (刘堡镇)
- Huchuan (胡川镇)
- Dayang (大阳镇)
- Chuanwang (川王镇)

Townships

- Zhangmian Township (张棉乡)
- Muhe Township (木河乡)
- Lianwu Township (连五乡)
- Ping'an Township (平安乡)
- Yanjia Township (阎家乡)

== Climate ==
Climate data for Zhangjiachuan, elevation 1,665 m (5,463 ft), (1991–2020 normals, extremes 1981–2010)
Month	Jan	Feb	Mar	Apr	May	Jun	Jul	Aug	Sep	Oct	Nov	Dec	Year
Record high °C (°F)	12.3 (54.1)	17.5 (63.5)	25.4 (77.7)	29.3 (84.7)	29.9 (85.8)	32.2 (90.0)	34.4 (93.9)	31.6 (88.9)	32.0 (89.6)	24.1 (75.4)	19.0 (66.2)	14.0 (57.2)	34.4 (93.9)
Mean daily maximum °C (°F)	1.8 (35.2)	4.9 (40.8)	10.6 (51.1)	16.9 (62.4)	20.8 (69.4)	24.2 (75.6)	26.0 (78.8)	24.8 (76.6)	19.8 (67.6)	14.2 (57.6)	8.6 (47.5)	3.3 (37.9)	14.7 (58.4)
Daily mean °C (°F)	−4.9 (23.2)	−1.2 (29.8)	4.0 (39.2)	9.8 (49.6)	14.0 (57.2)	17.8 (64.0)	20.0 (68.0)	19.0 (66.2)	14.3 (57.7)	8.5 (47.3)	2.3 (36.1)	−3.3 (26.1)	8.4 (47.0)
Mean daily minimum °C (°F)	−10.0 (14.0)	−5.8 (21.6)	−1.0 (30.2)	3.7 (38.7)	7.8 (46.0)	11.9 (53.4)	14.9 (58.8)	14.3 (57.7)	10.0 (50.0)	4.1 (39.4)	−2.2 (28.0)	−8.1 (17.4)	3.3 (37.9)
Record low °C (°F)	−24.1 (−11.4)	−20.1 (−4.2)	−15.8 (3.6)	−7.4 (18.7)	−3.0 (26.6)	1.7 (35.1)	5.1 (41.2)	5.0 (41.0)	−0.5 (31.1)	−6.3 (20.7)	−16.0 (3.2)	−25.5 (−13.9)	−25.5 (−13.9)
Average precipitation mm (inches)	6.4 (0.25)	8.0 (0.31)	16.0 (0.63)	30.9 (1.22)	55.9 (2.20)	78.4 (3.09)	107.4 (4.23)	103.3 (4.07)	77.7 (3.06)	45.2 (1.78)	14.2 (0.56)	4.3 (0.17)	547.7 (21.57)
Average precipitation days (≥ 0.1 mm)	6.3	6.9	7.5	7.9	10.8	11.8	13.1	12.4	12.3	10.9	6.8	4.1	110.8
Average snowy days	11.3	9.8	6.0	1.5	0.1	0	0	0	0	1.0	4.3	7.1	41.1
Average relative humidity (%)	68	66	63	60	64	69	73	76	79	79	75	69	70
Mean monthly sunshine hours	156.9	139.4	173.2	202.5	216.6	203.6	197.2	188.0	132.6	134.7	144.8	161.6	2,051.1
Percentage possible sunshine	50	45	46	51	50	47	45	46	36	39	47	53	46
Source: China Meteorological Administration

== See also ==
- List of administrative divisions of Gansu
