= Huilong, Dazu District =

Huilong 回龙镇
- Town
- Location in Chongqing
- Coordinates: 29°43′45″N 105°51′49″E
- Country: People's Republic of China
- Municipality: Chongqing
- District: Dazu
- Village-level divisions: 1 residential community 7 villages
- Elevation: 297 m (974 ft)
- Time zone: UTC+8 (China Standard)
- Area code: 0023

Huilong (simplified Chinese: 回龙; traditional Chinese: 回龍; pinyin: Huílóng) is a town of Dazu District in western Chongqing Municipality, People's Republic of China, located 69 kilometres (43 mi) northwest of downtown Chongqing. As of 2011, it has one residential community (社区) and seven villages under its administration.

== See also ==
- List of township-level divisions of Chongqing
