= Wanshun, Chongqing =

Wanshun Town
- Town

Chinese transcription(s)
  - Simplified: 万顺镇
  - Traditional: 萬順鎮
  - Pinyin: Wànshùn Zhèn
- Location in China
- Coordinates: 30°02′29″N 106°58′21″E
- Country: People's Republic of China
- City: Chongqing
- district: Changshou District

Area
  - Total: 57 km^{2} (22 sq mi)

Population
  - Total: 30,000
  - Density: 530/km^{2} (1,400/sq mi)
- Time zone: UTC+8 (China Standard)
- Postal code: 401227
- Area code: 023

Wanshun Town (simplified Chinese: 万顺镇; traditional Chinese: 萬順鎮; pinyin: Wànshùn Zhèn) is an urban town in Changshou District, Chongqing, People's Republic of China.

== Administrative divisions ==
The town is divided into 8 villages, which include the following areas: Wanshun Village, Sichong Village, Baihe Village, Yuanzi Village, Wanhua Village, Dongfeng Village, Shilong Village, and Yakou Village (万顺村、四重村、白合村、院子村、万花村、东风村、石龙村、垭口村).

== See also ==
- List of township-level divisions of Chongqing
