= Duzhou, Chongqing =

Duzhou Subdistrict
- Subdistrict

Chinese transcription(s)
  - Simplified: 渡舟街道
  - Traditional: 渡舟街道
  - Pinyin: Dùzhōu Jiēdào
- Location in China
- Coordinates: 29°52′48″N 107°04′53″E
- Country: People's Republic of China
- City: Chongqing
- district: Changshou District

Area
  - Total: 114 km^{2} (44 sq mi)

Population
  - Total: 44,000
  - Density: 390/km^{2} (1,000/sq mi)
- Time zone: UTC+8 (China Standard)
- Postal code: 401256
- Area code: 023

Duzhou Subdistrict (Chinese: 渡舟街道; pinyin: Dùzhōu Jiēdào) is a Subdistrict in Changshou District, Chongqing, People's Republic of China.

== Administrative divisions ==
The subdistrict is divided into 15 villages and 3 communities, which include the following areas: Changshengqiao Community, Shengtian Community, Duzhonglu Community, Duzhou Village, Yanqiao Village, Guoyuan Village, Huanglian Village, Sanhao Village, Xindaolu Village, Puti Village, Tianba Village, Taiping Village, Baiguo Village, Tianqiao Village, Ganzhe Village, Gaofeng Village, Baofeng Village, and Hetang Village (长生桥社区、胜天社区、渡中路社区、渡舟村、堰桥村、果园村、黄连村、三好村、新道路村、菩堤村、田坝村、太平村、白果村、天桥村、甘蔗村、高峰村、保丰村、河塘村).

== See also ==
- List of township-level divisions of Chongqing
