= Jiangnan, Chongqing =

Jiangnan Subdistrict
- Subdistrict

Chinese transcription(s)
  - Simplified: 江南街道
  - Traditional: 江南街道
  - Pinyin: Jiāngnán Jiēdào
- Location in China
- Coordinates: 29°47′36″N 107°02′14″E
- Country: People's Republic of China
- City: Chongqing
- district: Changshou District

Area
  - Total: 67.89 km^{2} (26.21 sq mi)

Population
  - Total: 22,000
  - Density: 320/km^{2} (840/sq mi)
- Time zone: UTC+8 (China Standard)
- Postal code: 401258
- Area code: 023

Jiangnan Subdistrict (Chinese: 江南街道; pinyin: Jiāngnán Jiēdào) is a Subdistrict in Changshou District, Chongqing, People's Republic of China.

== Administrative divisions ==
The subdistrict is divided into 7 villages and 2 communities, which include the following areas: Nanbinlu Community, Longshan Community, Longqiaohu Village, Shantuo Village, Wubao Village, Dayuan Village, Juliang Village, Dabao Village, and Tianxing Village (南滨路社区、龙山社区、龙桥湖村、扇沱村、五堡村、大元村、锯梁村、大堡村、天星村).

== See also ==
- List of township-level divisions of Chongqing
