= Changshouhu, Chongqing =

Changshouhu Town
- Town

Chinese transcription(s)
  - Simplified: 长寿湖镇
  - Traditional: 長壽湖鎮
  - Pinyin: Chángshòuhú Zhèn
- Location in China
- Coordinates: 29°54′29″N 107°14′22″E
- Country: People's Republic of China
- City: Chongqing
- district: Changshou District

Area
  - Total: 104.53 km^{2} (40.36 sq mi)

Population
  - Total: 51,000
  - Density: 490/km^{2} (1,300/sq mi)
- Time zone: UTC+8 (China Standard)
- Postal code: 401248
- Area code: 023

Changshouhu Town (simplified Chinese: 长寿湖镇; traditional Chinese: 長壽湖鎮; pinyin: Chángshòuhú Zhèn) is an urban town in Changshou District, Chongqing, People's Republic of China.

== Administrative divisions ==
The town is divided into 13 villages and 1 community, which include the following areas: Shizitan Community, Xiangtang Village, Donghai Village, Huilong Village, Hongguang Village, Huashan Village, Shiling Village, Dashi Village, Shihui Village, Longgou Village, Zizhu Village, Lianggui Village, Anshun Village, and Yuhua Village (狮子滩社区、响塘村、东海村、回龙村、红光村、花山村、石岭村、大石村、石回村、龙沟村、紫竹村、两桂村、安顺村、玉华村).

== See also ==
- List of township-level divisions of Chongqing
