= Bake, Chongqing =

Bake Town
- Town

Chinese transcription(s)
  - Simplified: 八颗镇
  - Traditional: 八顆鎮
  - Pinyin: Bākē Zhèn
- Location in Chongqing.
- Coordinates: 29°54′05″N 107°01′30″E
- Country: People's Republic of China
- City: Chongqing
- district: Changshou District

Area
  - Total: 99.25 km^{2} (38.32 sq mi)

Population
  - Total: 46,000
  - Density: 460/km^{2} (1,200/sq mi)
- Time zone: UTC+8 (China Standard)
- Postal code: 401225
- Area code: 023

Bake (simplified Chinese: 八颗镇; traditional Chinese: 八顆鎮; pinyin: Bākē Zhèn) is an urban subdistrict in Changshou District, Chongqing, People's Republic of China.

== Administrative divisions ==
The town is divided into 15 villages, which include the following areas: Bake Village, Fengsheng Village, Shima Village, Shuguang Village, Wuhua Village, Xingfu Village, Shuijing Village, Hetao Village, Xinqiao Village, Gaoxin Village, Meiman Village, Fuhe Village, Luping Village, Zitong Village, and Gantan Village (八颗村、丰胜村、石马村、曙光村、武华村、幸福村、水井村、核桃村、新桥村、高新村、美满村、付何村、鹿坪村、梓潼村、干滩村).

== See also ==
- List of township-level divisions of Chongqing
