= Honghu, Chongqing =

Honghu Town
- Town

Chinese transcription(s)
  - Simplified: 洪湖镇
  - Traditional: 洪湖鎮
  - Pinyin: Hónghú Zhèn
- Location in Chongqing.
- Coordinates: 30°00′13″N 106°57′22″E
- Country: People's Republic of China
- City: Chongqing
- district: Changshou District

Area
  - Total: 103.65 km^{2} (40.02 sq mi)

Population
  - Total: 36,542
  - Density: 352.55/km^{2} (913.11/sq mi)
- Time zone: UTC+8 (China Standard)
- Postal code: 401225
- Area code: 023

Honghu Town (simplified Chinese: 洪湖镇; traditional Chinese: 洪湖鎮; pinyin: Hónghú Zhèn) is an urban town in western Changshou District, Chongqing, People's Republic of China. It is 65 kilometers from Chongqing proper, has a total area of 103.65 square kilometers, and is the fifth largest town in the district.

== Geography ==
Honghu is flanked by the Yueming mountains to the west and the Tongluo mountains on the opposite side. Two rivers pass through the town, which also contains one lake, Dahong, covering more than 3,000 acres.

== Population ==
The town administers 14 villages and 1 community. Its 2023 population is 36542, comprising 15968 households. There are 362 small to medium private enterprises and 894 self-employed businesses.

The 14 villages are: Fenghuang, Biao'er, Yongshun, Puxing, Pingtan, Chengtuo, Tizi, Caoyan, Matou, Luchi, Heiyan, Sanhe, Wulong, and Changsheng (凤凰村、表耳村、永顺村、普兴村、坪滩村、称沱村、梯子村、草堰村、码头村、芦池村、黑岩村、三合村、五龙村、长生村).

== Agriculture ==
Honghu is an agricultural town. It has 28 thousand acres of cultivated area and 68.8 thousand acres of forested area primarily in the mountains. The town's main products are fruits, vegetables, livestock and poultry. Orchards for pears and citrus make up to 8,000 acres and 7,000 acres of land respectively. Pigs, chicken, and ducks are raised, and a variety of fish is produced.

== See also ==
- List of township-level divisions of Chongqing
