= Shangqingsi =

Subdistrict in Yuzhong, Chongqing, China

Shangqingsi subdistrict (Chinese: 上清寺街道) is a subdistrict of Yuzhong District in Chongqing, China.

== Administrative subdivisions ==
Shangqingsi governs the following districts: Guihuayuan Road, Chunsen Road, Xindu Alley, Xuetianwan Bay, Shangdatian Bay, Shangqingsi Road and Zengjiayan.

== See also ==
- List of township-level divisions of Chongqing
