= Dandu, Chongqing =

Dandu Town
- Town

Chinese transcription(s)
  - Simplified: 但渡镇
  - Traditional: 但渡鎮
  - Pinyin: Dàndù Zhèn
- Location in China
- Coordinates: 29°50′15″N 107°08′56″E
- Country: People's Republic of China
- City: Chongqing
- district: Changshou District

Area
  - Total: 57 km^{2} (22 sq mi)

Population
  - Total: 20,000
  - Density: 350/km^{2} (910/sq mi)
- Time zone: UTC+8 (China Standard)
- Postal code: 401251
- Area code: 023

Dandu Town (simplified Chinese: 但渡镇; traditional Chinese: 但渡鎮; pinyin: Dàndù Zhèn) is an urban town in Changshou District, Chongqing, People's Republic of China.

== Administrative divisions ==
The town is divided into 8 villages, which include the following areas: Nanmuyuan Village, Dandu Village, Shenggao Village, Shuanghe Village, Xingtong Village, Longzhai Village, Weiming Village, and Zengci Village (楠木院村、但渡村、升高村、双河村、兴同村、龙寨村、未名村、曾祠村).

== See also ==
- List of township-level divisions of Chongqing
