= Haiyang, Anhui =

Haiyang 海阳镇
- Town
- Location in China
- Coordinates: 29°46′28″N 118°10′56″E
- Country: People's Republic of China
- Province: Anhui
- Prefecture-level city: Huangshan City
- County: Xiuning County
- Time zone: UTC+8 (China Standard)

Haiyang (simplified Chinese: 海阳; traditional Chinese: 海陽; pinyin: Hǎiyáng) is a town under the administration of Xiuning County, Anhui, China. As of 2020, it has five residential neighborhoods and 12 villages under its administration:

Neighborhoods

- Hengjiang Community (横江社区)
- Qining Community (齐宁社区)
- Wanning Community (万宁社区)
- Luoning Community (萝宁社区)
- Xinchengqu (新城区)

Villages

- Beijie Village (北街村)
- Nanjie Village (南街村)
- Xintang Village (新塘村)
- Langsi Village (琅斯村)
- Chuanhu Village (川湖村)
- Yanfu Village (盐甫村)
- Wanquan Village (万全村)
- Shiren Village (石人村)
- Chaikeng Village (钗坑村)
- Shou Village (首村)
- Xiuyang Village (秀阳村)
- Wangjinqiao Village (汪金桥村)
