= Shuanggui, Sichuan =

Shuanggui 双桂镇
- Town
- Location in Sichuan
- Coordinates: 30°50′46″N 105°57′17″E
- Country: People's Republic of China
- Province: Sichuan
- Prefecture-level city: Nanchong
- District: Jialing District
- Time zone: UTC+8 (China Standard)

Shuanggui (Chinese: 双桂; pinyin: Shuāngguì) is a town under the administration of Jialing District, Nanchong, Sichuan, China. As of 2020, it has two residential neighborhoods and 15 villages under its administration:

Neighborhoods

- Guihua Community (桂花社区)
- Shilou Community (石楼社区)

Villages

- Guanyintang Village (观音堂村)
- Fengxiangshan Village (凤翔山村)
- Sanlongchang Village (三龙场村)
- Dashigou Village (大石沟村)
- Longguiyuan Village (龙归院村)
- Dalingshan Village (大灵山村)
- Fanjiaqiao Village (范家桥村)
- Changlesi Village (长乐寺村)
- Taihe Village (太和村)
- Dengjiagou Village (邓家沟村)
- Houjiagou Village (侯家沟村)
- Changtanba Village (长滩坝村)
- Luojiasi Village (罗家寺村)
- Madashan Village (马达山村)
- Yuanjiadian Village (袁家店村)

Shuanggui was formed in 2020 by merging the former Taihe Township (太和乡) and Shilou Township (石楼乡).
