= Haiyang Township, Chongqing =

Haiyang Township 海洋乡
- Township
- Location in Chongqing
- Coordinates: 28°44′8″N 109°7′6″E
- Country: People's Republic of China
- Direct-administered municipality: Chongqing
- Autonomous county: Xiushan Tujia and Miao Autonomous County
- Time zone: UTC+8 (China Standard)

Haiyang Township (simplified Chinese: 海洋乡; traditional Chinese: 海洋鄉; pinyin: Hǎiyáng Xiāng) is a township under the administration of Xiushan Tujia and Miao Autonomous County, Chongqing, China. As of 2020, it has six villages under its administration:

- Xiaoping Village (小坪村)
- Yizhi Village (一支村)
- Yanyuan Village (岩院村)
- Bamao Village (芭茅村)
- Balian Village (坝联村)
- Wusi Village (五四村)

== See also ==
- List of township-level divisions of Chongqing
