= Haitang, Chongqing =

Haitang 海棠镇
- Town
- Location in China
- Coordinates: 30°10′20″N 107°13′40″E
- Country: People's Republic of China
- Direct-administered municipality: Chongqing
- District: Changshou District

Area
  - Total: 46 km^{2} (18 sq mi)

Population
  - Total: 30,000
  - Density: 650/km^{2} (1,700/sq mi)
- Time zone: UTC+8 (China Standard)
- Postal code: 401237
- Area code: 023

Haitang (Chinese: 海棠; pinyin: Hǎitáng) is an urban town in Changshou District, Chongqing, People's Republic of China.

== Administrative divisions ==
As of 2020, the town is divided into the following nine villages:

- Haitang Village (海棠村)
- Xiaohe Village (小河村)
- Longfeng Village (龙凤村)
- Zhuangyan Village (庄严村)
- Gulin Village (古林村)
- Jiansheng Village (建生村)
- Qingquan Village (清泉村)
- Tuqiao Village (土桥村)
- Jinzi Village (金子村)

== See also ==
- List of township-level divisions of Chongqing
