= Haitang Subdistrict, Leshan =

Haitang Subdistrict 海棠街道
- Subdistrict
- Location in Sichuan
- Coordinates: 29°33′55″N 103°45′37″E
- Country: People's Republic of China
- Province: Sichuan
- Prefecture-level city: Leshan
- District: Shizhong District
- Time zone: UTC+8 (China Standard)

Haitang Subdistrict (Chinese: 海棠街道; pinyin: Hǎitáng Jiēdào) is a subdistrict in Shizhong District of Leshan, Sichuan, China. As of 2020, it administers the following 17 residential communities:

- Yanwu Street Community (演武街社区)
- Xujiabian Community (徐家扁社区)
- Wenchanggong Community (文昌宫社区)
- Wanghao'er Community (王浩儿社区)
- Shengshui Street Community (圣水街社区)
- Beimenqiao Community (北门桥社区)
- Shiyan'er Community (石雁儿社区)
- Qingguoshan Community (青果山社区)
- Jiaochangba Community (较场坝社区)
- Xianjie Community (县街社区)
- Baita Street Community (白塔街社区)
- Banzhuwan Community (斑竹湾社区)
- Xincun Street Community (新村街社区)
- Renminxi Road Community (人民西路社区)
- Fujie Community (府街社区)
- Guihualou Community (桂花楼社区)
- Shuijingchong Community (水井冲社区)

== See also ==
- List of township-level divisions of Sichuan
