= Haiyang Township, Guangxi =

Haiyang Township 海洋乡
- Township
- Location in Guangxi
- Coordinates: 25°18′33″N 110°33′47″E
- Country: People's Republic of China
- Autonomous region: Guangxi
- Prefecture-level city: Guilin
- County: Lingchuan County
- Time zone: UTC+8 (China Standard)

Haiyang Township (simplified Chinese: 海洋乡; traditional Chinese: 海洋鄉; pinyin: Hǎiyáng Xiāng) is a township under the administration of Lingchuan County, Guangxi, China. As of 2020, it administers Haiyang Residential Community and the following 13 villages:

- Haiyang Village
- Jiangwei Village (江尾村)
- Guoqing Village (国清村)
- Jiulian Village (九连村)
- Damiaotang Village (大庙塘村)
- Shuitou Village (水头村)
- Yaole Village (尧乐村)
- Datangbian Village (大塘边村)
- Xinmin Village (新民村)
- Xiaopingle Village (小平乐村)
- Bindong Village (滨洞村)
- Si'antou Village (思安头村)
- Antai Village (安泰村)
