= Shuanggui, Zhong County =

Shuanggui 双桂镇
- Town
- Location in Chongqing
- Coordinates: 30°14′37″N 107°35′22″E
- Country: People's Republic of China
- Direct-administered municipality: Chongqing
- County: Zhong County
- Time zone: UTC+8 (China Standard)

Shuanggui (Chinese: 双桂; pinyin: Shuāngguì) is a town under the administration of Zhong County, Chongqing, China. As of 2020, it administers Guixi Residential Community (桂溪社区) and the following 11 villages:

- Shuanggui Village
- Lianhua Village (莲花村)
- Ganchang Village (赶场村)
- Shiqiao Village (石桥村)
- Tongde Village (同德村)
- Jiulong Village (九龙村)
- Shibao Village (石宝村)
- Renhe Village (仁和村)
- Datang Village (大塘村)
- Longqiao Village (龙桥村)
- Guoqiao Village (过桥村)

== See also ==
- List of township-level divisions of Chongqing
