= Maguan, Chongqing =

Maguan 马灌镇
- Town
- Location in Chongqing
- Coordinates: 30°23′46″N 107°44′12″E
- Country: People's Republic of China
- Direct-administered municipality: Chongqing
- County: Zhong County
- Time zone: UTC+8 (China Standard)

Maguan (Chinese: 马灌; pinyin: Mǎguàn) is a town in Zhong County, Chongqing, China. As of 2020, it administers four residential neighborhoods and 16 villages:

Neighborhoods

- Maguan Community
- Gaodong Community (高洞社区)
- Huangqin Community (黄钦社区)
- Daoguan Community (倒灌社区)

Villages

- Dafan Village (大梵村)
- Luoyang Village (洛阳村)
- Shuangji Village (双基村)
- Helin Village (鹤林村)
- Shuangshi Village (双石村)
- Guoyuan Village (果园村)
- Jinbao Village (金宝村)
- Gaodu Village (高渡村)
- Qixin Village (齐心村)
- Hexin Village (合心村)
- Jingui Village (金桂村)
- Guiyang Village (桂阳村)
- Daqiao Village (大桥村)
- Gaoqiao Village (高桥村)
- Longxiao Village (龙肖村)
- Baigao Village (白高村)

== See also ==
- List of township-level divisions of Chongqing
