= Shuanglong, Chongqing =

Shuanglong Town
- Town

Chinese transcription(s)
  - Simplified: 双龙镇
  - Traditional: 雙龍鎮
  - Pinyin: Shuānglóng Zhèn
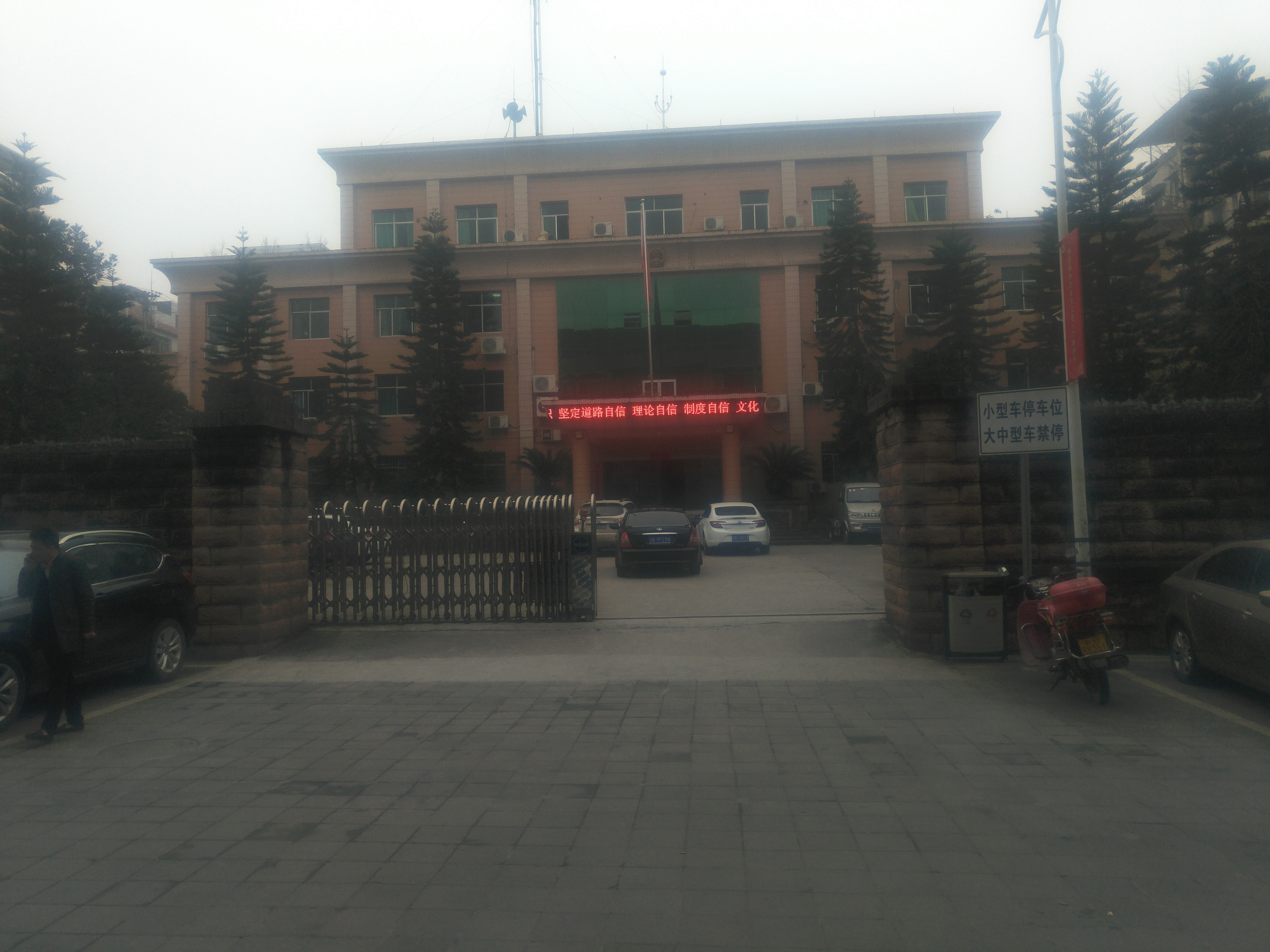

- Location in Chongqing.
- Coordinates: 29°57′40″N 107°12′17″E
- Country: People's Republic of China
- City: Chongqing
- district: Changshou District

Area
  - Total: 57 km^{2} (22 sq mi)

Population
  - Total: 41,000
  - Density: 720/km^{2} (1,900/sq mi)
- Time zone: UTC+8 (China Standard)
- Postal code: 401241
- Area code: 023

Shuanglong Town (simplified Chinese: 双龙镇; traditional Chinese: 雙龍鎮; pinyin: Shuānglóng Zhèn) is a town in Changshou District, Chongqing, People's Republic of China.

== Administrative divisions ==
The town is divided into 11 villages and 1 community, which include the following areas: Shuanglong Community, Longtan Village, Guhuang Village, Feishi Village, Changshouzhai Village, Lianhe Village, Luowei Village, Jianshan Village, Hongyan Village, Qunli Village, Lianfeng Village, and Tiantang Village (双龙社区、龙滩村、谷黄村、飞石村、长寿寨村、联合村、罗围村、尖山村、红岩村、群力村、连丰村、天堂村).

== See also ==
- List of township-level divisions of Chongqing
