= Linfeng, Chongqing =

Linfeng Town
- Town

Chinese transcription(s)
  - Simplified: 邻封镇
  - Traditional: 鄰封鎮
  - Pinyin: Línfēng Zhèn
- Location in China
- Coordinates: 29°53′32″N 107°12′52″E
- Country: People's Republic of China
- City: Chongqing
- district: Changshou District

Area
  - Total: 55.85 km^{2} (21.56 sq mi)

Population
  - Total: 36,000
  - Density: 640/km^{2} (1,700/sq mi)
- Time zone: UTC+8 (China Standard)
- Postal code: 401249
- Area code: 023

Linfeng Town (simplified Chinese: 邻封镇; traditional Chinese: 鄰封鎮; pinyin: Línfēng Zhèn) is an urban town in Changshou District, Chongqing, People's Republic of China.

== Administrative divisions ==
The town is divided into 10 villages, which include the following areas: Linfeng Village, Shangdong Village, Qingguan Village, Wangta Village, Shangping Village, Sanhua Village, Baojia Village, Jiaojia Village, Miaoshan Village, and Shixin Village (邻封村、上硐村、青观村、汪塔村、上坪村、三化村、保家村、焦家村、庙山村、石心村).

== See also ==
- List of township-level divisions of Chongqing
