= Yunji, Chongqing =

Yunji Town
- Town

Chinese transcription(s)
  - Simplified: 云集镇
  - Traditional: 云集鎮
  - Pinyin: Yúnjí Zhèn
- Location in China
- Coordinates: 29°54′00″N 107°17′13″E
- Country: People's Republic of China
- City: Chongqing
- district: Changshou District

Area
  - Total: 115.32 km^{2} (44.53 sq mi)

Population
  - Total: 35,000
  - Density: 300/km^{2} (790/sq mi)
- Time zone: UTC+8 (China Standard)
- Postal code: 401246
- Area code: 023

Yunji Town (simplified Chinese: 云集镇; traditional Chinese: 云集鎮; pinyin: Yúnjí Zhèn) is an urban town in Changshou District, Chongqing, People's Republic of China.

== Administrative divisions ==
The town is divided into 11 villages, which include the following areas: Huazhong Village, Yulong Village, Leizu Village, Feilong Village, Wanshou Village, Fusheng Village, Dasheng Village, Manao Village, Qingfeng Village, Datong Village, and Jianfeng Village (华中村、玉龙村、雷祖村、飞龙村、万寿村、福胜村、大胜村、玛瑙村、青丰村、大同村、尖锋村).

== See also ==
- List of township-level divisions of Chongqing
