= Maguan, Gansu =

Maguan 马关镇
- Town
- Location within Gansu
- Coordinates: 35°3′58″N 106°2′9″E
- Country: People's Republic of China
- Province: Gansu
- Prefecture-level city: Tianshui
- Autonomous county: Zhangjiachuan Hui Autonomous County
- Time zone: UTC+8 (China Standard)

Maguan (simplified Chinese: 马关; traditional Chinese: 馬關; pinyin: Mǎguān) is a rural town in Zhangjiachuan Hui Autonomous County, Gansu, China. As of 2020, it has two residential neighborhoods and 15 villages under its administration:

Neighborhoods

- Caowan (草湾)
- Xinyi (新义)

Villages

- Shichuan Village (石川村)
- Xishan Village (西山村)
- Dongzhuang Village (东庄村)
- Huanghua Village (黄花村)
- Shanghe Village (上河村)
- Badu Village (八杜村)
- Xitai Village (西台村)
- Xizhuang Village (西庄村)
- Shangdou Village (上豆村)
- Xiaozhuang Village (小庄村)
- Miaowan Village (庙湾村)
- Zhaogou Village (赵沟村)
- Mapu Village (马堡村)
- Dongshan Village (东山村)
- Weigou Village (韦沟村)
