= Tongnan, Chongqing =

Tongnan 潼南区
- District
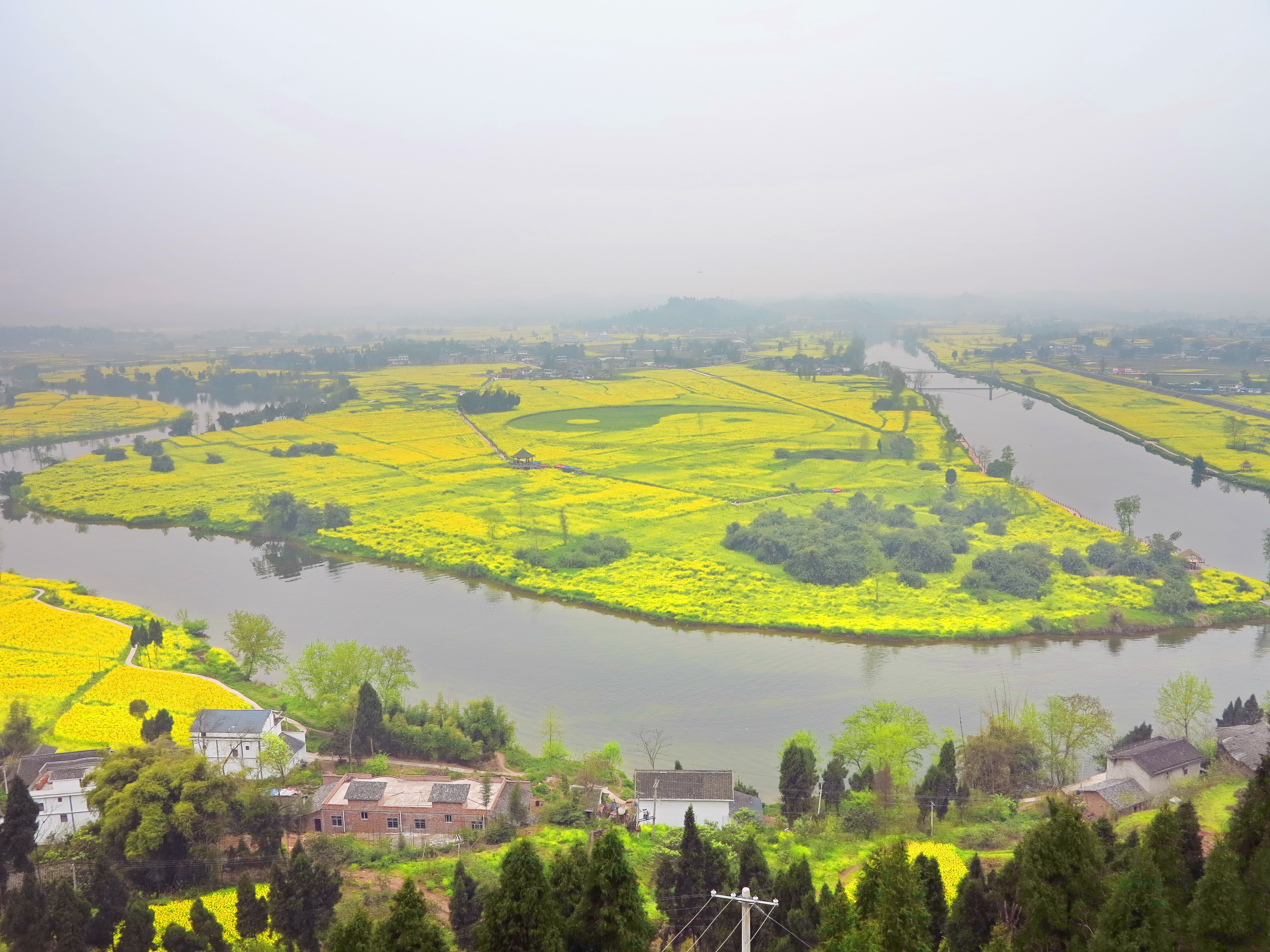

- Location of Tongnan in Chongqing
- Country: People's Republic of China
- Municipality: Chongqing

Area
  - Total: 1,585 km^{2} (612 sq mi)

Population (2010)
  - Total: 640,000
  - Density: 400/km^{2} (1,000/sq mi)
- Time zone: UTC+8 (China Standard)

Tongnan District (Chinese: 潼南区; pinyin: Tóngnán Qū) is a district of Chongqing Municipality, China, bordering Sichuan province to the north and west.

== Administration ==
Name	Chinese (S)	Hanyu Pinyin	Population (2010)	Area (km^{2})
Guilin Subdistrict	桂林街道	Guìlín Jiēdào	30,674	80.387
Zitong Subdistrict	梓潼街道	Zǐtóng Jiēdào	76,335	151.1
Shanghe town	上和镇	Shànghé Zhèn	10,698	68.2
Longxing town	龙形镇	Lóngxíng Zhèn	12,425	38.6
Guxi town	古溪镇	Gǔxī Zhèn	17,272	39
Baolong town	宝龙镇	Bǎolóng Zhèn	7,320	42.27
Yuxi town	玉溪镇	Yùxī Zhèn	8,165	45.1
Mixin town	米心镇	Mǐxīn Zhèn	7,031	30.1
Qunli town	群力镇	Qúnlì Zhèn	5,614	49.1
Shuangjiang town	双江镇	Shuāngjiāng Zhèn	17,260	104.6
Huayan town	花岩镇	Huāyán Zhèn	3,092	25.58
Baizi town	柏梓镇	Bǎizǐ Zhèn	23,990	72.83
Chongkan town	崇龛镇	Chóngkān Zhèn	14,050	87.6
Tangba town	塘坝镇	Tángbà Zhèn	23,027	101.6
Xinsheng town	新胜镇	Xīnshèng Zhèn	8,000	52.3
Tai'an town	太安镇	Tài'ān Zhèn	12,358	60.8
Xiaodu town	小渡镇	Xiǎodù Zhèn	13,844	88.2
Wofo town	卧佛镇	Wòfú Zhèn	12,300	95.7
Wugui town	五桂镇	Wǔguì Zhèn	4,171	32.9
Tianjia town	田家镇	Tiánjiā Zhèn	8,316	30.2
Biekou town	别口镇	Biékǒu Zhèn	4,014	30.48
Shouqiao town	寿桥镇	Shòuqiáo Zhèn	3,301	20.94

== Climate ==
Climate data for Tongnan, elevation 332 m (1,089 ft), (1991–2020 normals, extremes 1981–present)
Month	Jan	Feb	Mar	Apr	May	Jun	Jul	Aug	Sep	Oct	Nov	Dec	Year
Record high °C (°F)	16.2 (61.2)	21.6 (70.9)	30.4 (86.7)	34.2 (93.6)	36.5 (97.7)	36.5 (97.7)	42.5 (108.5)	44.4 (111.9)	40.5 (104.9)	31.2 (88.2)	25.0 (77.0)	18.0 (64.4)	44.4 (111.9)
Mean daily maximum °C (°F)	9.9 (49.8)	13.0 (55.4)	18.0 (64.4)	23.6 (74.5)	27.1 (80.8)	29.3 (84.7)	32.4 (90.3)	32.8 (91.0)	27.5 (81.5)	21.5 (70.7)	16.7 (62.1)	11.0 (51.8)	21.9 (71.4)
Daily mean °C (°F)	6.9 (44.4)	9.5 (49.1)	13.7 (56.7)	18.7 (65.7)	22.3 (72.1)	24.9 (76.8)	27.8 (82.0)	27.7 (81.9)	23.3 (73.9)	18.1 (64.6)	13.5 (56.3)	8.3 (46.9)	17.9 (64.2)
Mean daily minimum °C (°F)	4.8 (40.6)	6.9 (44.4)	10.5 (50.9)	15.0 (59.0)	18.6 (65.5)	21.7 (71.1)	24.3 (75.7)	24.0 (75.2)	20.5 (68.9)	15.9 (60.6)	11.2 (52.2)	6.4 (43.5)	15.0 (59.0)
Record low °C (°F)	−1.7 (28.9)	0.1 (32.2)	0.0 (32.0)	5.9 (42.6)	9.4 (48.9)	14.1 (57.4)	18.4 (65.1)	17.6 (63.7)	13.4 (56.1)	4.7 (40.5)	2.6 (36.7)	−2.3 (27.9)	−2.3 (27.9)
Average precipitation mm (inches)	16.1 (0.63)	18.3 (0.72)	37.8 (1.49)	78.0 (3.07)	125.2 (4.93)	161.3 (6.35)	165.3 (6.51)	141.2 (5.56)	118.2 (4.65)	84.4 (3.32)	36.1 (1.42)	17.1 (0.67)	999 (39.32)
Average precipitation days (≥ 0.1 mm)	9.6	8.2	10.4	12.3	14.9	15.3	12.7	11.0	13.7	16.2	10.5	8.9	143.7
Average snowy days	0.4	0.2	0	0	0	0	0	0	0	0	0	0.2	0.8
Average relative humidity (%)	85	81	77	77	77	82	80	77	82	87	86	87	82
Mean monthly sunshine hours	32.1	45.6	90.4	122.2	123.8	115.5	172.4	180.3	96.5	56.2	47.8	27.5	1,110.3
Percentage possible sunshine	10	15	24	31	29	28	40	44	27	16	15	9	24
Source: China Meteorological Administration all-time extreme temperature all-time July high

== Culture and tourism ==
1. Tongnan Dafo Temple（大佛寺）

Located at the foot of Dingming Mountain in Tongnan District, Dafo Temple was built during the Song and Yuan dynasties and boasts a thousand-year history. The temple houses an 18.43-meter-tall golden Buddha statue, one of the largest indoor golden Buddha statues in the world. The temple complex includes the Great Buddha Hall, the Guanyin Hall, and the Jade Emperor Hall, and houses numerous Buddhist, Taoist, and Confucian statues, reflecting its profound religious and cultural heritage.

2. Shuangjiang Ancient Town（双江古镇）

Shuangjiang Ancient Town is one of Chongqing's ten most famous historical and cultural towns, boasting a well-preserved cluster of Qing Dynasty buildings. The town boasts nine ancient streets, including Middle Street, Upper Street, and Lower Street, and over 20 historic buildings showcasing the traditional Sichuan and Chongqing residential style.

3. Chongkan Rapeseed Flower Sea（崇龛油菜花海）

Chongkan Town is home to one of China's largest rapeseed flower fields. Every spring, 20 square kilometers of rapeseed fields transform into a golden canvas, attracting thousands of visitors. From the summit of Chentuan Mountain, you can overlook the Tai Chi diagram, the world's largest at 236 meters in diameter.

4. Baizi Lemon Town（柏梓柠檬小镇）

Bai Zi Town, known as the "Hometown of Lemons," is renowned for its lemon cultivation and processing. It hosts the annual International Lemon Festival and International Half Marathon, attracting numerous visitors.

5. Tongnan Grand Buddha Temple (铜南大佛寺)

Tongnan Buddha Temple is renowned for its history, originally called "Dingming Yuan" or "Nan Chan Sui", the temple gained its current name "Great Buddha Temple" during the Song Dynasty when a colossal Buddha Statue was carved into the surrounding mountains.
