= Changshou, Chongqing =

Changshou 长寿区 Changshow
- District
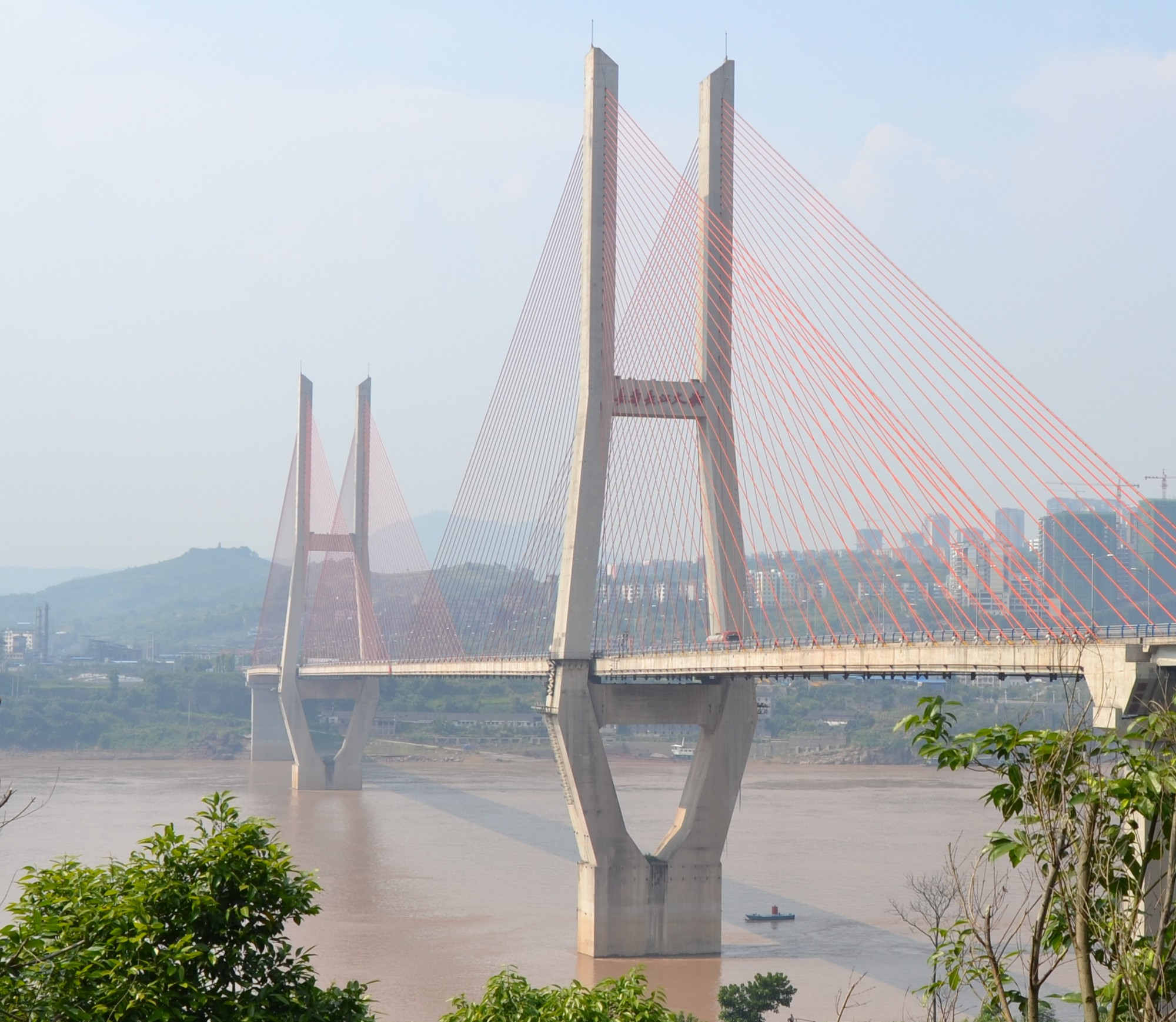
- Changshou Yangtze River Bridge
- Interactive map of Changshou
- Country: People's Republic of China
- Municipality: Chongqing

Area
  - District: 1,421 km^{2} (549 sq mi)

Population (2020 census)
  - District: 692,960
  - Density: 487.7/km^{2} (1,263/sq mi)
  - Urban: 484,331 (70%)
  - Rural: 208,629 (30%)
- Time zone: UTC+8 (China Standard)

Changshou (Chinese: 长寿区; pinyin: Chángshòu Qū) is a district in Chongqing, China, located by the Yangtze river, with a history spanning several thousand years. Changshou is 80 km (50 mi) from the Yuzhong District of downtown Chongqing.

== Administrative divisions ==
Changshou District administers 14 townships and 4 subdistricts, with a total area of 1,415 km^{2} (546 sq mi).

Name	Chinese (S)	Hanyu Pinyin	Population (2010)	Area (km^{2})
Fengcheng Subdistrict	凤城街道	Fèngchéng Jiēdào	175,576	72.7
Yanjia Subdistrict	晏家街道	Yànjiā Jiēdào	72,825	95
Jiangnan Subdistrict	江南街道	Jiāngnán Jiēdào	21,509	68.8
Duzhou Subdistrict	渡舟街道	Dùzhōu Jiēdào	51,888	114
Bake Subdistrict	八颗街道	Bākē Jiēdào	36,698	99.25
Xinshi Subdistrict	新市街道	Xīnshì Jiēdào	21,578	37
Linfeng town	邻封镇	Línfēng Zhèn	23,868	55
Dandu town	但渡镇	Dàndù Zhèn	14,497	57
Yunji town	云集镇	Yúnjí Zhèn	27,564	115.32
Changshouhu town	长寿湖镇	Chángshòuhú Zhèn	37,839	104.53
Shuanglong town	双龙镇	Shuānglóng Zhèn	29,213	57
Longhe town	龙河镇	Lónghé Zhèn	35,561	89.9
Shiyan town	石堰镇	Shíyàn Zhèn	48,193	101.78
Yuntai town	云台镇	Yúntái Zhèn	40,328	87.32
Haitang town	海棠镇	Hǎitáng Zhèn	24,252	46
Gelan town	葛兰镇	Gélán Zhèn	55,938	47.5
Honghu town	洪湖镇	Hónghú Zhèn	30,426	103.65
Wanshun town	万顺镇	Wànshùn Zhèn	22,256	57

== History ==
Changshou has a history of 2300 years.

- In 316 BC, a Zhi county was established.
- In 226 AD, it was renamed Jiangzhou county.
- In 519, it was renamed as Lewen county.
- In 1362, it was renamed as Changshou county.
- In 1959, Changshou County was put under the administration of Chongqing city.
- In 2002, Changshou County was changed into Changshou District and it is a district in Chongqing city.

== Population ==
Until the end of 2013, there are 369321 households, the total population is 906732. Among them, the non-agriculture population is 310531, agriculture population is 596201.

== Geography ==
Changshou is located in 106°49’22” E – 107°27’30”E of longitude and 29°43’ N – 30°12’30”N of latitude, and is 56.56 km (35.14 mi) wide from south to north, and 57.5 km (35.7 mi) long from east to west. The altitude in the area is between 154 to 1,034.2 m (505 to 3,393 ft). Changshou is classified as shallow hill area, slopes in the area are relatively smooth.

=== Climate ===
Climate data for Changshou, elevation 378 m (1,240 ft), (1991–2020 normals, extremes 1981–present)
Month	Jan	Feb	Mar	Apr	May	Jun	Jul	Aug	Sep	Oct	Nov	Dec	Year
Record high °C (°F)	20.9 (69.6)	23.9 (75.0)	31.9 (89.4)	35.0 (95.0)	36.4 (97.5)	37.0 (98.6)	40.0 (104.0)	42.9 (109.2)	42.0 (107.6)	34.7 (94.5)	29.3 (84.7)	17.4 (63.3)	42.9 (109.2)
Mean daily maximum °C (°F)	9.4 (48.9)	12.4 (54.3)	17.3 (63.1)	22.7 (72.9)	26.1 (79.0)	28.7 (83.7)	32.9 (91.2)	33.2 (91.8)	27.9 (82.2)	21.4 (70.5)	16.5 (61.7)	10.6 (51.1)	21.6 (70.9)
Daily mean °C (°F)	7.1 (44.8)	9.4 (48.9)	13.4 (56.1)	18.3 (64.9)	21.7 (71.1)	24.6 (76.3)	28.2 (82.8)	28.2 (82.8)	23.8 (74.8)	18.2 (64.8)	13.7 (56.7)	8.4 (47.1)	17.9 (64.3)
Mean daily minimum °C (°F)	5.4 (41.7)	7.3 (45.1)	10.7 (51.3)	15.1 (59.2)	18.5 (65.3)	21.6 (70.9)	24.5 (76.1)	24.3 (75.7)	20.7 (69.3)	16.1 (61.0)	11.7 (53.1)	6.9 (44.4)	15.2 (59.4)
Record low °C (°F)	−1.1 (30.0)	−0.1 (31.8)	0.5 (32.9)	5.5 (41.9)	10.0 (50.0)	14.8 (58.6)	18.6 (65.5)	18.0 (64.4)	13.4 (56.1)	6.2 (43.2)	2.7 (36.9)	−2.0 (28.4)	−2.0 (28.4)
Average precipitation mm (inches)	20.8 (0.82)	23.9 (0.94)	57.1 (2.25)	104.3 (4.11)	175.2 (6.90)	187.9 (7.40)	134.6 (5.30)	129.4 (5.09)	117.4 (4.62)	110.6 (4.35)	59.1 (2.33)	25.2 (0.99)	1,145.5 (45.1)
Average precipitation days (≥ 0.1 mm)	9.8	9.3	11.7	14.4	16.9	15.5	11.4	11.8	12.4	16.4	11.6	10.8	152
Average snowy days	0.5	0.3	0	0	0	0	0	0	0	0	0	0.2	1
Average relative humidity (%)	84	81	77	78	80	82	75	72	78	85	86	87	80
Mean monthly sunshine hours	33.7	46.2	87.2	112.5	110.8	105.1	184.7	194.2	114.1	64.8	51.9	28.7	1,133.9
Percentage possible sunshine	10	15	23	29	26	25	43	48	31	19	16	9	25
Source: China Meteorological Administration all-time extreme temperature all-time January high

== Transportation ==
Chongqing–Fuling Freeway and other two freeways are intersected in Changshou area. Chongqing–Wanzhou Railway is under construction to provide transportation for businesses and tourists. Changshou has two Yangtze River crossings, a road and a railway bridge.

Changshou District is 50 kilometers away from Chongqing Jiangbei International Airport.

== Economy ==
- In 2006, the total annual GDP was CNY 8.8 billion.

== Tourism ==
Famous tourist attractions include Lake Changshou, which is a man-made lake of 60 km^{2} (23 sq mi); Changshou Ancient Town; Puti Mountain and Dongling Temple.

Mount Puti is a tourist attraction in the district.

== Special Local Product ==
- Changshou Grapefruit
- Changshou Rice Noodle
- Blood Tofu
