= River Town =

River Town can refer to:

- River Town: Two Years on the Yangtze, 2001 book by Peter Hessler
- River Town (1999 book), book written by Bonnie Geisert and illustrated by Arthur Geysers
- River Town (baseball) (born 1999), an American baseball player who formerly played in the Kansas City Royals organization, as well as the Mexican Baseball League and Mexican Pacific Winter League

== See also ==
- River Township, Red Lake County, Minnesota
