= Peter Hessler bibliography =

List of works by or about Peter Hessler, American journalist.

== Books ==
- Hessler, Peter (2001). River town : two years on the Yangtze. New York: HarperCollins.
- — (2006). Oracle bones : a journey between China's past and present. New York: HarperCollins.
- — (2010). Country driving : a journey through China from farm to factory. New York: Harper.
- — (2013). Strange Stones: Dispatches from East and West. New York: Harper.
- — (2019). The Buried: An Archaeology of the Egyptian Revolution. New York: Penguin.
- — (2024). Other Rivers: A Chinese Education. New York: Penguin.

== Essays and reporting ==
- Hessler, Peter (February 1999). "Tibet Through Chinese Eyes". The Atlantic.
- — (July 24, 2000). "A rat in my soup". Postcard from China. The New Yorker.
- — (June 2006). "Voices - Peter Hessler in China". National Geographic. Archived from the original on June 2, 2006.
- — (January 12, 2009). "Strange Stones : Two Midwestern refugees on the road to the Tibetan Plateau". Letter from China. The New Yorker. 84 (44): 30–35.
- — (September 26, 2011). "Dr. Don : the life of a small-town druggist". Letter from Nucla, Colorado. The New Yorker.
- — (December 19–26, 2011). "The Mosque on the Square". Letter from Cairo. The New Yorker. 87 (41): 46–57. Abstract
- — (May 21, 2012). "Identity Parade". The New Yorker.
- — (January 14, 2013). "Big Brothers : where is the Muslim Brotherhood leading Egypt?". Letter from Cairo. The New Yorker. 88 (43): 24–30.
- — (March 2013). "Return to River Town". National Geographic. Archived from the original on March 2, 2023.
- — (July 22, 2013). "The Showdown". Letter from Cairo. The New Yorker. 89 (21): 26–32.
- — (March 7, 2016). "Living-room democracy : in rural Egypt, political candidates go door-to-door". Letter from El-Balyana. The New Yorker. 92 (4): 30–35.
- — (January 2, 2017). "The shadow general : President Sisi has unwittingly revealed more about the way Egypt now works than anyone could have imagined". Letter from Cairo. The New Yorker. 92 (43): 44–55.
- — (May 7, 2018). "Cairo: A Type of Love Story". Personal History. The New Yorker.
- — (April 1, 2019) "The Refugee and the Thief, A Gay Egyptian leaves his Homeland." The New Yorker.
- — (June 21, 2021). "Year of the Bunny Hill : as China prepares to host the Winter Olympics, the country gets on skis". A Reporter at Large. The New Yorker. 97 (17): 32–41.
- — (May 16, 2022). "A bitter education : a teacher in China encounters the limits of free expression". Letter from Chengdu. The New Yorker. 98 (12): 48–56, 59.
