= Fuling, Chongqing =

Fuling 涪陵区 Fowling
- District
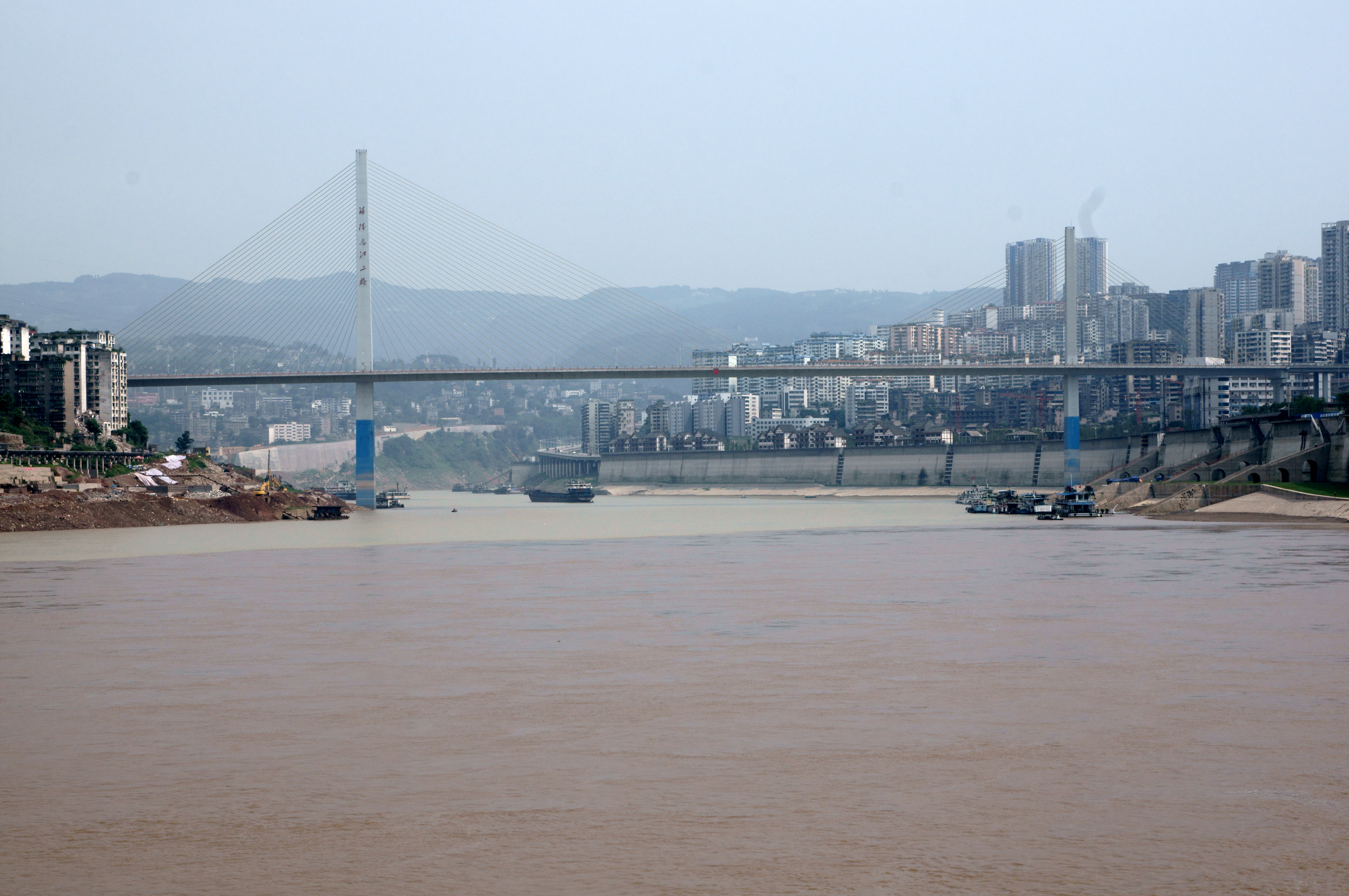
- Fuling Wujiang Bridge

- Fuling District in Chongqing
- Interactive map of Fuling
- Coordinates (Fuling District government): 29°42′12″N 107°23′23″E
- Country: People's Republic of China
- Municipality: Chongqing

Area
  - Total: 2,941.46 km^{2} (1,135.70 sq mi)
- Elevation: 287 m (942 ft)

Population (2020)
  - Total: 1,115,016
  - Density: 379.069/km^{2} (981.784/sq mi)
- Time zone: UTC+8 (China Standard)

Fuling
- Chinese: 涪陵
- Postal: Fowling
- Literal meaning: "Fu (River) mausoleum"
Transcriptions
Standard Mandarin
- Hanyu Pinyin: Fúlíng
- Wade–Giles: Fu^{2}-ling^{2}

Fuling District (Chinese: 涪陵区; pinyin: Fúlíng Qū) is a district in central Chongqing, China. It is the second-largest district in Chongqing. Former U.S. Peace Corps teacher Peter Hessler worked in the district for two years and later wrote the memoir River Town: Two Years on the Yangtze.

The district spans an area of 2,941.46 square kilometres (1,135.70 mi^{2}), and has a population of 1,115,016, according to the 2020 Chinese Census.

== History ==
According to the district's government, the area comprising contemporary Fuling District has been inhabited since approximately 3000 BCE.

During the Spring and Autumn period, the area was inhabited by the Baipu people. From the middle and late part of Spring and Autumn period, through to the middle of the Warring States period, the area belonged to the State of Ba. The area was at some point the site of one of the Ba's capitals, and a Ba king is buried within the area. During the middle and latter part of the Warring States period, the area belonged to the State of Chu.

Following the State of Chu, the area was incorporated into the Qin dynasty as the Ba Commandery. The area reorganized in 227 BCE, under the rule of King Zhaoxiang of Qin, as Zhi County.

During the Eastern Han, Zhi County was merged into Pingdu County.

In the Three Kingdoms period, the area was ruled by the Shu Han, and organized as Hanping County (simplified Chinese: 汉平县; traditional Chinese: 漢平縣; pinyin: Hànpíng Xiàn). Hanping County was subordinate to the Fuling Commandery, whose capital was located in present-day Yushan in the nearby Pengshui Miao and Tujia Autonomous County, to the southeast of Fuling District.

In 347 CE, under the Eastern Jin, the area was again reorganized as Fu Commandery (Chinese: 涪郡; pinyin: Fú Jùn), which was also known as Zhicheng Commandery (Chinese: 枳城郡; pinyin: Zhǐchéng Jùn).

The area's administrative divisions were reorganized dramatically during the Northern and Southern dynasties.

The Sui dynasty would reorganize the area into three counties: Fuling County (simplified Chinese: 涪陵县; traditional Chinese: 涪陵縣; pinyin: Fúlíng Xiàn), which belonged to the Ba Commandery, Fengdu County (simplified Chinese: 丰都县; traditional Chinese: 豐都縣; pinyin: Fēngdū Xiàn), which belonged to the Badong Commandery, and Dianjiang County (simplified Chinese: 垫江县; traditional Chinese: 墊江縣; pinyin: Diànjiāng Xiàn), which belonged to the Dangqu Commandery.

In 618 CE, during the Tang dynasty, the area was reorganized as Fu Zhou, which governed Wulong County, Fuling County, and Longhua County.

Under the Northern Song, Longhua County was changed to Binhua County. During the Southern Song, Fu Zhou was reestablished to govern the area, and administered Fuling County and Wulong County.

Fu Zhou remained intact during the Yuan dynasty and the Ming dynasty, and governed Wulong County. Fu Zhou would continue intact during the Qing dynasty, but was not divided into counties. During this time, Fu Zhou was under the jurisdiction of Chongqing Fu.

In 1913, shortly after the establishment of the Republic of China, Fu Zhou was reorganized as Fuling County. Fuling County initially fell under the jurisdiction of Chuandong Circuit, then directly under the jurisdiction of Sichuan in 1928, and finally under the Eight Administrative Inspectorate of Sichuan.

Following the establishment of the People's Republic of China, the area saw administrative reforms in early 1950. Fuling County was reorganized as Fuling Area, under the jurisdiction of Chuandong Area. Fuling Area governed seven counties: Fuling, Nanchuan, Fengdu, Shizhu, Wulong, Changshou and Pengshui. In September 1952, Youyang Area was merged into Fuling Area, adding the counties of Dianjiang, Qianjiang, Youyang, and Xiushan. Changshou County was absorbed into Chongqing, which then had a prefecture-level status instead of its present provincial-level status, in 1958.

Fuling Area was replaced by Fuling Prefecture in 1968. Fuling County became a county-level city in 1983. The prefecture became a Three Gorges provincial planning region (三峡省筹备区域) the following year. In 1988, Qianjiang, Youyang, Xiushan, Pengshui, and Shizhu counties were transferred to the jurisdiction of the newly organized Qianjiang Prefecture. Nanchuan County was re-designated as a county-level city in 1994. On November 5, 1995, the State Council passed legislation to abolish the county-level city of Fuling and replace it with two districts: Zhicheng District (Chinese: 枳城区) and Lidu District (Chinese: 李渡区). This change would come into effect in January 1996. In March 1996, Fuling Prefecture was re-designated as a prefecture-level city, which governed Zhicheng District, Lidu District, Nanchuan City, Dianjiang County, Fengdu County and Wulong County.

On September 15, 1996, legislature passed by the State Council placed the prefecture-level city of Fuling under the administration of Chongqing. On March 14, 1997, the National People's Congress changed Chongqing to become a direct-administered municipality. This was followed by legislation by the State Council on December 20, 1997 which abolished Fuling's prefecture-level status, revoking Zhicheng District and Lidu District, and placing Nanchuan City, Wulong County, Fengdu County, and Dianjiang County all under the direct jurisdiction of Chongqing. The now-defunct Zhicheng District and Lidu District became contemporary Fuling District.

== Geography ==
Fuling District is located on the southeastern edge of the Sichuan Basin, between latitude 29°21' to 30°01' north, and longitude 106°56' to 107°43' east, covering an area of 2,941.46 square kilometres (1,135.70 mi^{2}). The easternmost point is Baijibao (Chinese: 白鸡堡) in the town of Jiaoshi, the westernmost point is Dachayuan (Chinese: 大茶园) in the town of Zengfu, the southernmost point is Jinjiadian (Chinese: 金家店) in the town of Tongle, and the northernmost point is Hongqiangyuan (Chinese: 红墙院). Fuling District spans 74.5 kilometres (46.3 mi) from west to east, and 70.8 kilometres (44.0 mi) from north to south. Fuling City is located at the confluence of the Wu River and the Yangtze, in the heart of the Three Gorges Reservoir Region.

Located in the central part of Chongqing, Fuling District is bordered by Fengdu County to the east, Wulong District and Nanchuan District to the south, Banan District to the west, and Changshou District and Dianjiang County to the north.

=== Climate ===
Fuling District has a monsoon-influenced humid subtropical climate (Köppen Cwa), with four distinct seasons and ample rainfall: winters are short, mild, and comparatively dry, while summers are long, hot, and humid. Monthly daily average temperatures range from 7.5 °C (45.5 °F) in January to 28.4 °C (83.1 °F) in July, while the annual mean is 18.2 °C (64.8 °F). The diurnal temperature variation is 6.6 °C (11.9 °F) and is especially small during winter. Around 87% of the annual precipitation falls from April to October.

Climate data for Fuling District, elevation 373 m (1,224 ft), (1991–2020 normals, extremes 1971–present)
Month	Jan	Feb	Mar	Apr	May	Jun	Jul	Aug	Sep	Oct	Nov	Dec	Year
Record high °C (°F)	18.0 (64.4)	25.3 (77.5)	34.6 (94.3)	36.2 (97.2)	37.9 (100.2)	39.2 (102.6)	40.7 (105.3)	43.5 (110.3)	43.4 (110.1)	36.8 (98.2)	28.9 (84.0)	18.4 (65.1)	43.5 (110.3)
Mean daily maximum °C (°F)	9.8 (49.6)	12.8 (55.0)	17.9 (64.2)	23.2 (73.8)	26.6 (79.9)	29.3 (84.7)	33.3 (91.9)	33.6 (92.5)	28.5 (83.3)	21.9 (71.4)	16.8 (62.2)	10.9 (51.6)	22.1 (71.7)
Daily mean °C (°F)	7.5 (45.5)	9.7 (49.5)	13.8 (56.8)	18.6 (65.5)	22.0 (71.6)	24.9 (76.8)	28.4 (83.1)	28.3 (82.9)	24.1 (75.4)	18.6 (65.5)	14.0 (57.2)	8.9 (48.0)	18.2 (64.8)
Mean daily minimum °C (°F)	5.9 (42.6)	7.6 (45.7)	11.0 (51.8)	15.3 (59.5)	18.7 (65.7)	21.8 (71.2)	24.5 (76.1)	24.4 (75.9)	20.9 (69.6)	16.5 (61.7)	12.1 (53.8)	7.5 (45.5)	15.5 (59.9)
Record low °C (°F)	−1.5 (29.3)	−0.3 (31.5)	1.3 (34.3)	4.2 (39.6)	11.1 (52.0)	15.8 (60.4)	18.3 (64.9)	18.7 (65.7)	14.9 (58.8)	7.4 (45.3)	3.0 (37.4)	−2.2 (28.0)	−2.2 (28.0)
Average precipitation mm (inches)	18.5 (0.73)	21.2 (0.83)	55.9 (2.20)	106.8 (4.20)	164.1 (6.46)	171.3 (6.74)	144.6 (5.69)	122.3 (4.81)	109.6 (4.31)	104.4 (4.11)	55.6 (2.19)	23.5 (0.93)	1,097.8 (43.2)
Average precipitation days (≥ 0.1 mm)	9.2	8.5	11.9	14.7	16.6	15.3	11.9	11.5	11.9	16.5	11.4	10.4	149.8
Average snowy days	0.3	0.1	0	0	0	0	0	0	0	0	0	0.1	0.5
Average relative humidity (%)	83	79	76	77	79	81	74	72	78	85	85	86	80
Mean monthly sunshine hours	19.9	37.6	76.9	107.5	112.2	109.4	189.6	194.6	121.4	62.3	45.7	18.6	1,095.7
Percentage possible sunshine	6	12	21	28	27	26	44	48	33	18	14	6	24
Source 1: China Meteorological Administration All-time Oct high
Source 2: Weather China

== Demographics ==
Historical population
Year	Pop.	±%
2010	1,066,714	—
2020	1,115,016	+4.5%

Fuling District has a population of 1,115,016, according to the 2020 Chinese Census. This represents a 4.53% increase from the 1,066,714 recorded in the 2010 Chinese Census. As of 2022, the population of Fuling District was reported to be 1,115,200, with a slight decrease of about 816 people compared to 2020.

As of 2020, 71.85% of the district's population is urbanized, up from 55.80% in 2010.

=== Age and household structure ===
14.93% of the district's population is 14 years old or younger, 63.91% is between 15 and 59 years old, and 21.16% is 60 years old or older. 18.02% of the district's population is 65 years or older. Compared to 2010, the proportion of people age 14 or younger dropped 0.96%, the proportion of people age 15 to 59 fell 2.10%, and the proportion of people age 60 or older rose 3.06%. The proportion of people age 65 or older rose 5.63% from 2010 to 2020. The average household size in Fuling District totaled 2.44 people, a decrease from the 2.91 size recorded in 2010.

=== Educational attainment ===
12.85% of the district's population had attained a tertiary education, according to 2020 figures. An additional 16.97% of the district's population had attained a secondary education, an additional 34.88% attained a junior high education, an additional 28.44% attained a primary education, and the remaining 6.86% of the population had no formal education. People above the age of 14 in the district have attained an average of 9.68 years of formal education, an increase from the 8.73 years average recorded in 2010. Fuling District had a literacy rate of 98.57% as of 2020, an increase from 94.82% in 2010.

== Administrative divisions ==
Fuling District administers 11 subdistricts, 14 towns, and 2 townships. These township-level divisions in turn administer 719 administrative villages and 80 residential communities.

Name	Chinese (S)	Hanyu Pinyin
Dunren Subdistrict	敦仁街道	Dūnrén Jiēdào
Chongyi Subdistrict	崇义街道	Chóngyì Jiēdào
Lizhi Subdistrict	荔枝街道	Lìzhī Jiēdào
Jiangbei Subdistrict	江北街道	Jiāngběi Jiēdào
Jiangdong Subdistrict	江东街道	Jiāngdōng Jiēdào
Lidu Subdistrict	李渡街道	Lǐdù Jiēdào
Longqiao Subdistrict	龙桥街道	Lóngqiáo Jiēdào
Baitao Subdistrict	白涛街道	Báitāo Jiēdào
Ma'an Subdistrict	马鞍街道	Mǎ'ān Jiēdào
Linshi Subdistrict	蔺市街道	Lìnshì Jiēdào
Yihe Subdistrict	义和街道	Yìhé Jiēdào
Nantuo	南沱镇	Nántuó Zhèn
Qingyang	青羊镇	Qīngyáng Zhèn
Baisheng	百胜镇	Bǎishèng Zhèn
Zhenxi	珍溪镇	Zhēnxī Zhèn
Qingxi	清溪镇	Qīngxī Zhèn
Jiaoshi	焦石镇	Jiāoshí Zhèn
Mawu	马武镇	Mǎwǔ Zhèn
Longtan	龙潭镇	Lóngtán Zhèn
Xinmiao	新妙镇	Xīnmiào Zhèn
Shituo	石沱镇	Shítuó Zhèn
Tongle	同乐镇	Tónglè Zhèn
Dashun	大顺镇	Dàshùn Zhèn
Zengfu	增福镇	Zēngfú Zhèn
Luoyun	罗云镇	Luōyún Zhèn
Damu Township	大木乡	Dàmù Xiāng
Wulingshan Township	武陵山乡	Wǔlíngshān Xiāng

=== 2010 divisions ===
Name	Chinese (S)	Hanyu Pinyin	Population (2010)	Area (km^{2})
Dunren Subdistrict	敦仁街道	Dūnrén Jiēdào	105,296	3.8
Chongyi Subdistrict	崇义街道	Chóngyì Jiēdào	75,746	11.24
Lizhi Subdistrict	荔枝街道	Lìzhī Jiēdào	156,753	126
Jiangbei Subdistrict	江北街道	Jiāngběi Jiēdào	36,538	78.09
Jiangdong Subdistrict	江东街道	Jiāngdōng Jiēdào	51,078	91.6
Lidu Subdistrict	李渡街道	Lǐdù Jiēdào	88,124	91.1
Longqiao Subdistrict	龙桥街道	Lóngqiáo Jiēdào	34,541	63.2
Baitao Subdistrict	白涛街道	Báitāo Jiēdào	46,160	121.5
Nantuo	南沱镇	Nántuó Zhèn	26,447	67.14
Qingyang	青羊镇	Qīngyáng Zhèn	16,197	107.4
Baisheng	百胜镇	Bǎishèng Zhèn	41,114	114
Zhenxi	珍溪镇	Zhēnxī Zhèn	50,017	56.3
Qingxi	清溪镇	Qīngxī Zhèn	29,285	83.5
Jiaoshi	焦石镇	Jiāoshí Zhèn	23,454	78.2
Mawu	马武镇	Mǎwǔ Zhèn	32,360	55.5
Longtan	龙潭镇	Lóngtán Zhèn	36,511	80.6
Linshi town	蔺市镇	Lìnshì Zhèn	41,730	82.3
Xinmiao	新妙镇	Xīnmiào Zhèn	34,299	81.7
Shituo	石沱镇	Shítuó Zhèn	26,144	54
Yihe town	义和镇	Yìhé Zhèn	37,390	70.4
Luoyun Township	罗云乡	Luōyún Xiāng	14,940	56.5
Damu Township	大木乡	Dàmù Xiāng	3,200	96.3
Wulingshan Township	武陵山乡	Wǔlíngshān Xiāng	6,360	103.3
Dashun Township	大顺乡	Dàshùn Xiāng	18,844	
Zengfu Township	增福乡	Zēngfú Xiāng	15,527	70.4
Tongle Township	同乐乡	Tónglè Xiāng	18,659	65.73

== Economy ==
Fuling District had a total gross domestic product (GDP) of 140.274 billion renminbi (RMB) as of 2021, an 8.7% increase from 2020. As of the latest available data, Fuling District's economic performance has been notable. The materials industry plays a significant role in Fuling's economy, with a 2023 production value of 120.4-billion-yuan, accounting for one-fifth of Chongqing's total. This industry leads all districts and counties in Chongqing, highlighting its importance to the region's economic development.

The district's primary sector accounted for 6.48% of total GDP in 2021, and grew at a rate of 6.4% from 2020; the secondary sector accounted for 55.80% of GDP, and grew 6.7% from 2020; the tertiary sector accounted for 37.72% of GDP, and grew 12.0% from 2020.

Moreover, Fuling District has been actively developing industrial clusters in key sectors such as chemical new materials, power batteries, lightweight automotive materials, and advanced new materials. The district's strategic location along the Yangtze River and its involvement in the New International Land-Sea Trade Corridor (ILSTC) have significantly boosted its export economy. In fact, Fuling's foreign trade volume reached 7.68 billion yuan from January to May 2024, marking a year-on-year increase of 3.8%, and ranking fifth in Chongqing.

== Transportation ==
Historically, Fuling was primarily served by Yangtze river boats, as the development of ground transportation was slow, due to the difficult terrain.

Railways arrived to the Fuling area only in the 21st century. First was the Chongqing–Huaihua Railway, completed in 2005. Its Fuling Railway Station is located a few kilometers west of town (29°42′10″N 107°19′45″E).

The high-speed Chongqing−Lichuan Railway, opened on December 28, 2013, serves Fuling as well, with its Fuling North Railway Station. This railway crosses the Yangtze near the city over the Hanjiatuo Bridge. The railway's Caijiagou Bridge (蔡家沟特大桥; 29°46′17″N 107°22′07″E), located in Fuling District, is said to be the world's tallest railway bridge, as measured by the height of the bridge's tallest pillar (139 m). The Nanchuan–Fuling Railway, completed in 2012, forms part of Chongqing's outer railway ring.

As of 2015, Fuling had five Yangtze River bridges.

== Education ==
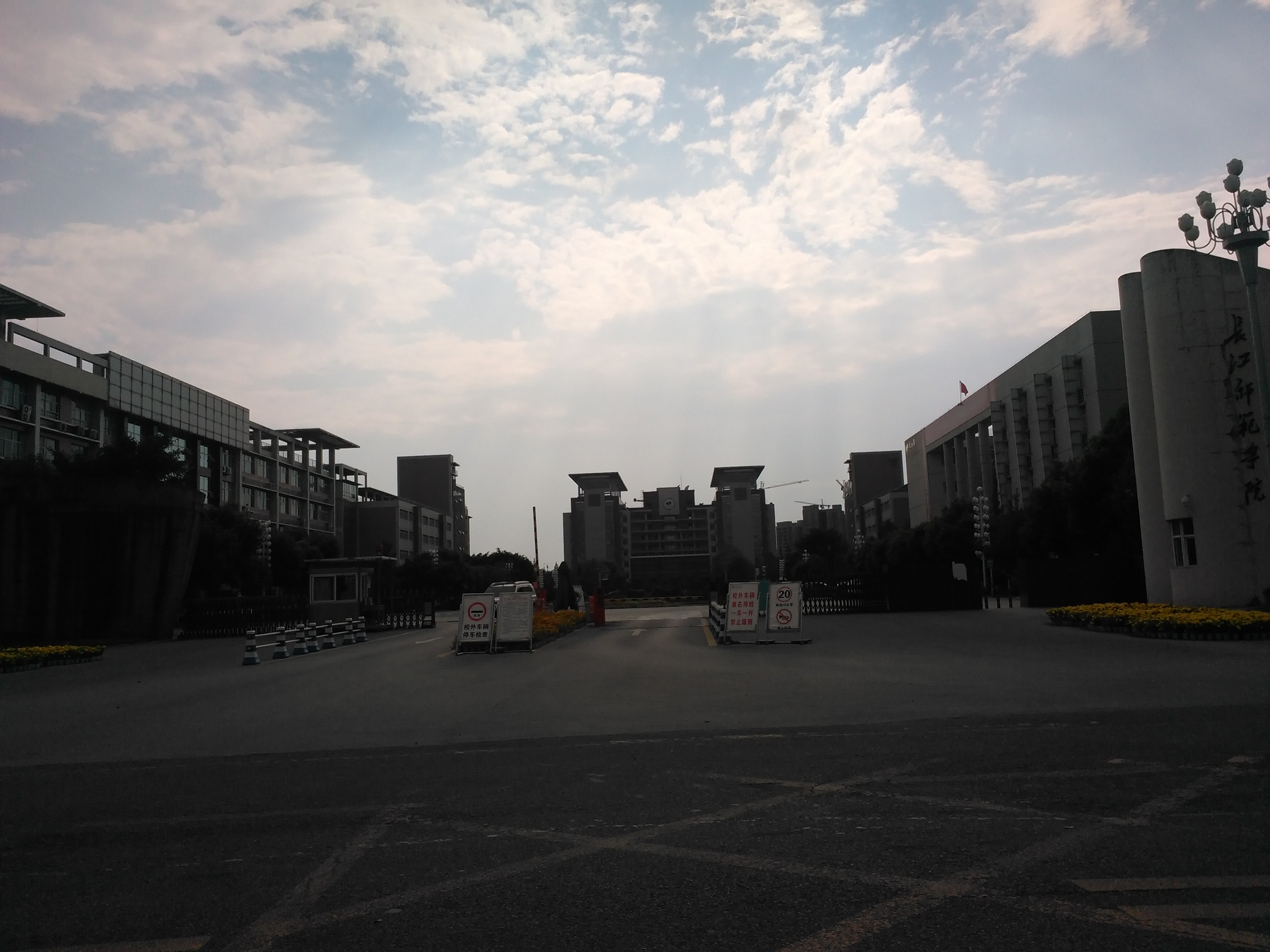
Yangtze Normal University

Yangtze Normal University (formerly Fuling Teachers College) is in Fuling. The university hosted Peace Corps volunteers from 1996 until 2020, when the last volunteers were evacuated from the Peace Corps China program in the wake of COVID-19.

== Culture ==
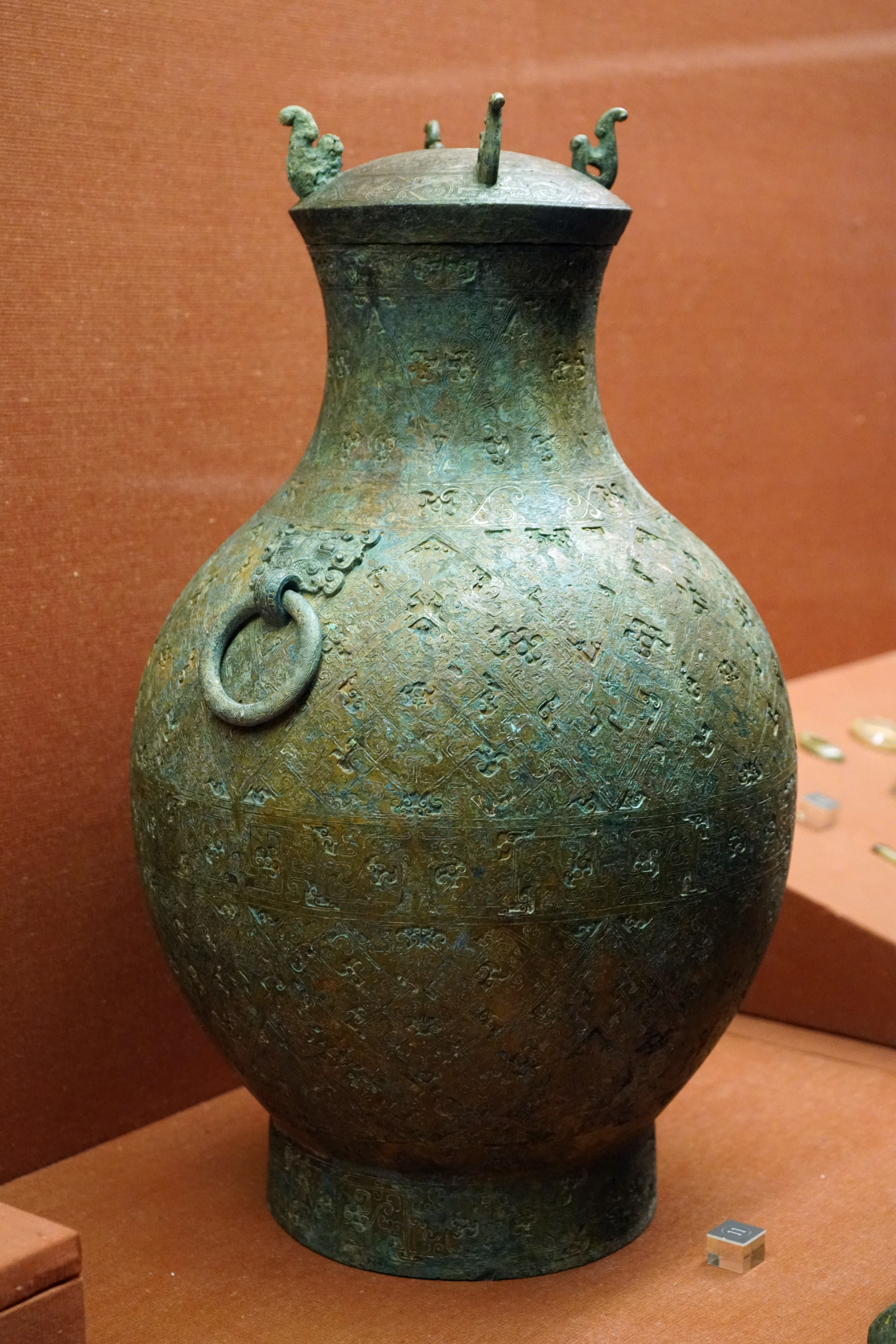
Silver-inlaid Copper Pot, Warring States period, unearthed at Xiaotianxi, Fuling

The White Crane Ridge (Baiheliang), a rock outcrop on the Yangtze River, has been used as a hydrological station recording water levels since the Tang Dynasty. It includes many rock carvings. With the flooding of the Yangtze as part of the Three Gorges Dam project, the White Crane Ridge Underwater Museum was opened in 2009 to protect the carvings and allow viewing by visitors under the new water level of the river.

=== Cuisine ===
The Wu River brand zha cai pickled mustard tuber is produced in Fuling. The Fuling Zhacai company is listed on the Shenzhen Stock Exchange, and in 2021 celebrated selling 15 billion packets.

In 1998, Peter Hessler wrote that most residents of Fuling were genetically incapable of being alcoholics. When imbibing large amounts of alcohol many people became very sick and they could not drink heavily all the time. Therefore, according to Hessler, consumption of alcohol was not habitual but rather a ritual, and drinking patterns were "abusive with light consequences."

== See also ==
- Fuling Catholic Church
- 816 Nuclear Military Plant

== Bibliography ==
- Hessler, Peter. River Town: Two Years on the Yangtze (ebook edition). HarperCollins e-books.
