= Fuling Wujiang Bridge =

Fuling Wujiang Bridge 重庆涪陵乌江二桥
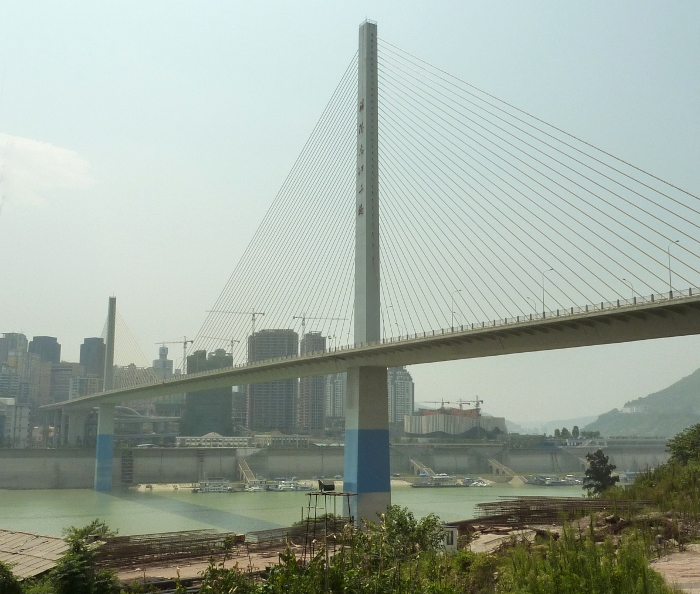
- Coordinates: 29.711111°N 107.402083°E
- Crosses: Wu River
- Locale: Fuling, Chongqing, China
- Other name: Fuling Wu River Bridge

Characteristics
- Design: Cable-stayed
- Material: Concrete / steel
- Total length: 590 metres (1,940 ft)
- Longest span: 340 metres (1,120 ft)

History
- Construction end: 2009
- Construction cost: RMB 260 million

Location
- Interactive map of Fuling Wujiang Bridge

Fuling Wujiang Bridge is a cable-stayed bridge in Fuling, Chongqing, China. The bridge spans 340 metres (1,120 ft) over the Wu River very near its confluence with the Yangtze river. Completed in 2009 the bridge was the second over the Wu River in Fuling after the Fuling Arch Bridge that was completed in 1989. The bridge contains a partial cloverleaf interchange on the western side of the river.
