= Fuling Catholic Church =

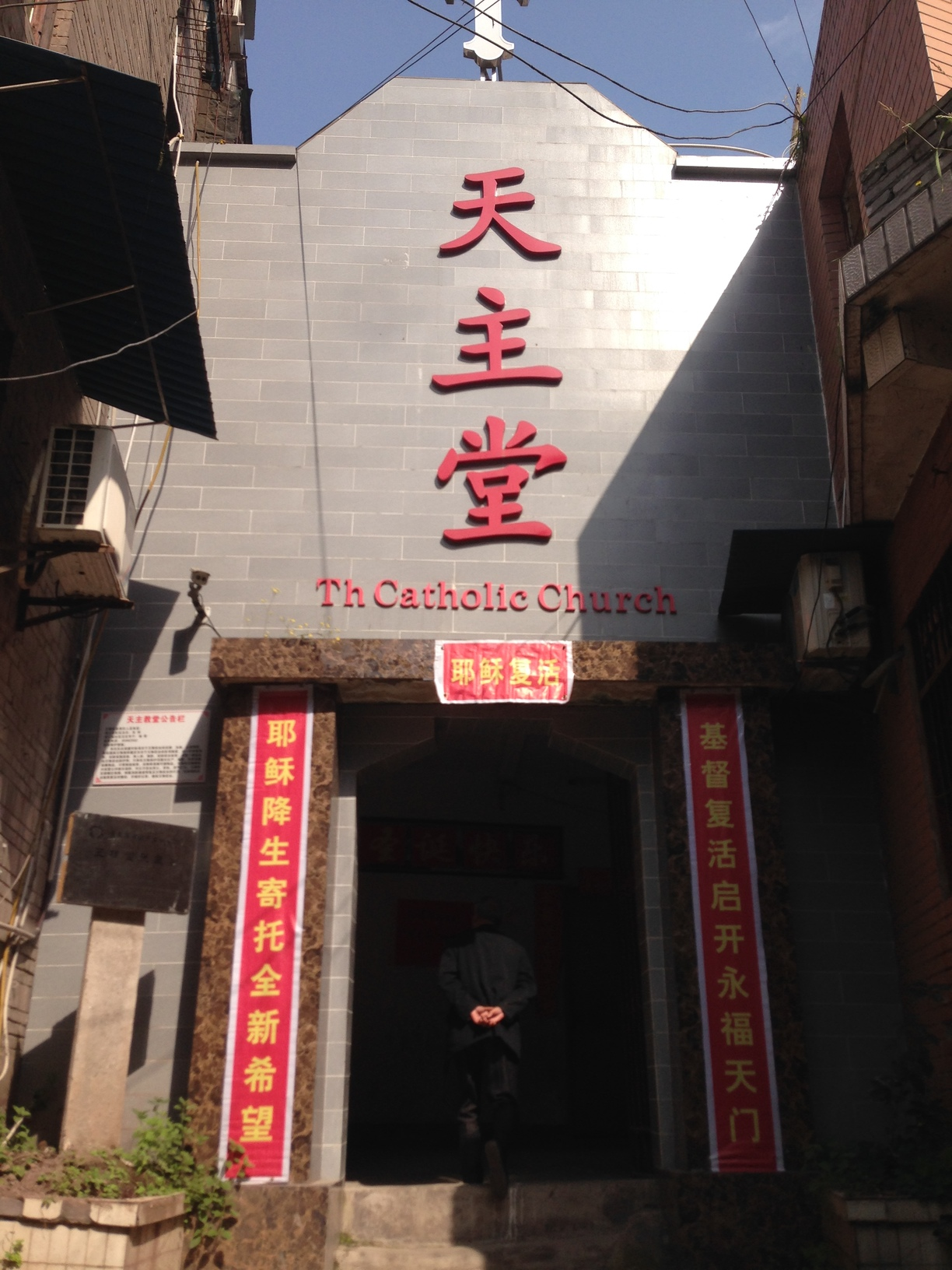
- The entrance to the courtyard of Fuling Catholic Church
- Fuling Catholic Church
- 29.724696°N 107.410076°E
- Location: Fuling District, City of Chongqing
- Country: China
- Denomination: Catholic Church

History
- Founded: 1861; 165 years ago
- Founder: Paris Foreign Missions Society

Architecture
- Functional status: Active
- Architectural type: Church
- Years built: 1861; 1991 (renovated)

Administration
- Archdiocese: Chongqing

Clergy
- Archbishop: Sede vacante

Fuling Catholic Church is a Roman Catholic church located in Fuling District of the city of Chongqing, West China. Founded in 1861, the church has been subjected to the control of the state-sanctioned Catholic Patriotic Association since 1957. In the West, it's best known for the description given by Peter Hessler in his book River Town: Two Years on the Yangtze (2001).

== History ==
The church was founded in 1861 by French missionaries. The church also had two French priests until the Communist Revolution; According to written sources, the church was converted into a sock factory by the Red Guards during the Cultural Revolution. The priest and the neighborhood, instead, assert that the church itself was just closed down and the sock factory was started in the buildings in front of the church.

In 1981 the church reopened and on the first Sunday about twenty people went to Mass. The church was renovated in 1991, as stated on the plaque next to the entrance of the church.

== The neighborhood ==
Fuling Catholic Church is located in Fuling historical city center. This area will be heavily renewed in 2017. Many buildings, except the very old ones, will be torn down. After consultation with the government, it has been agreed that the church will not be torn down and rebuilt in Lidu (李渡镇) neighborhood.

== Gallery ==
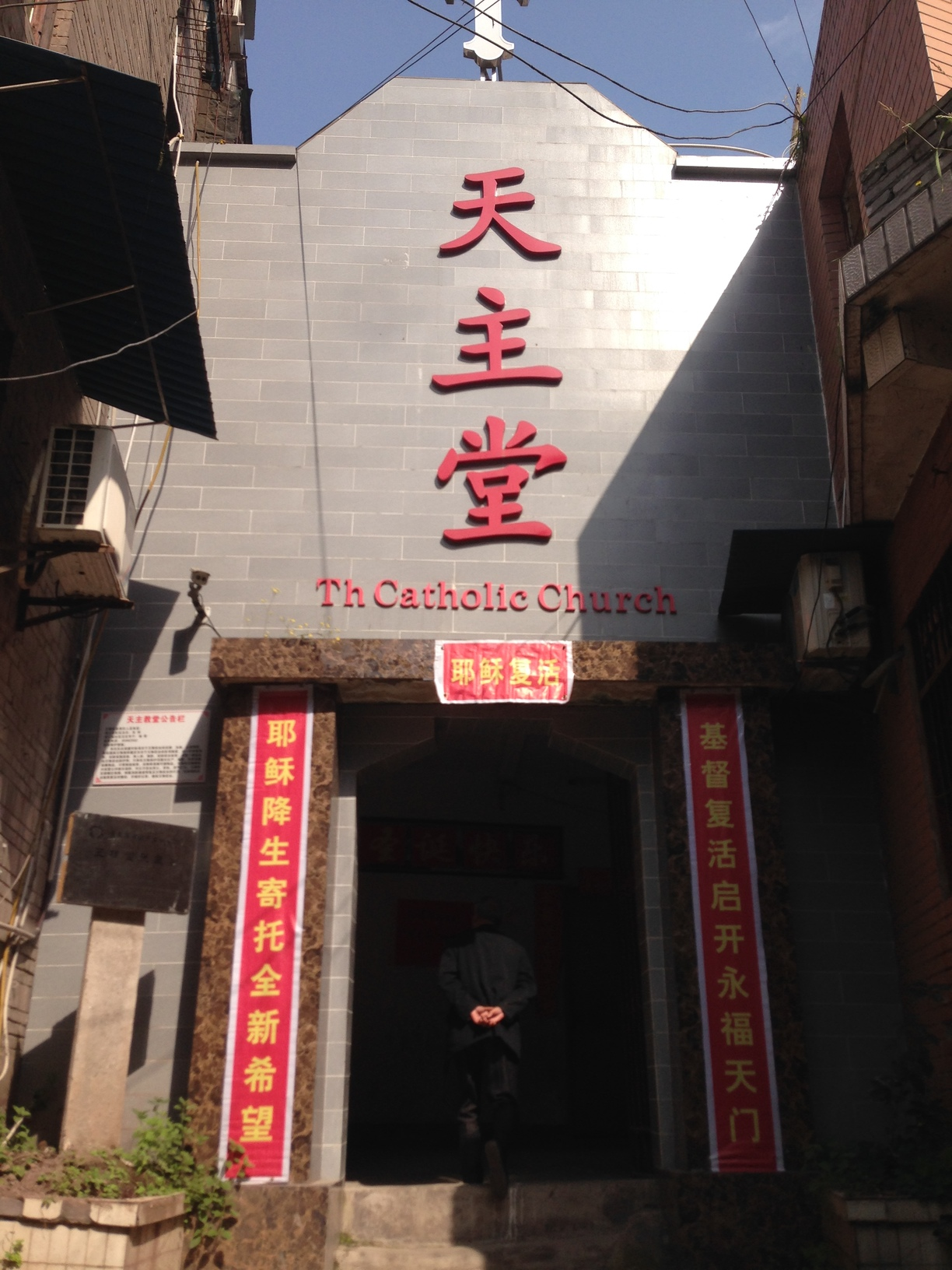
The entrance to the courtyard - 2017

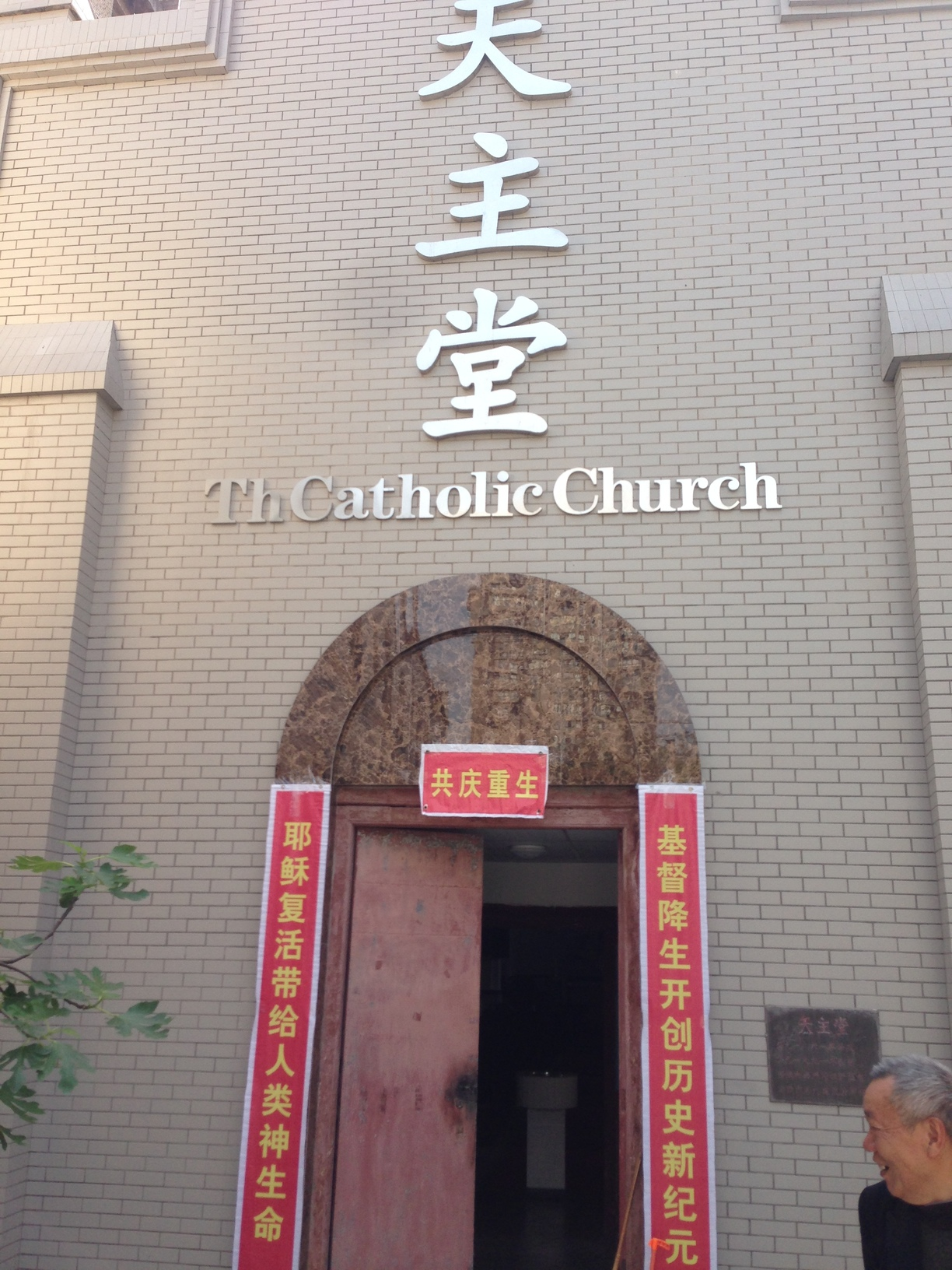
The entrance to the church - 2017

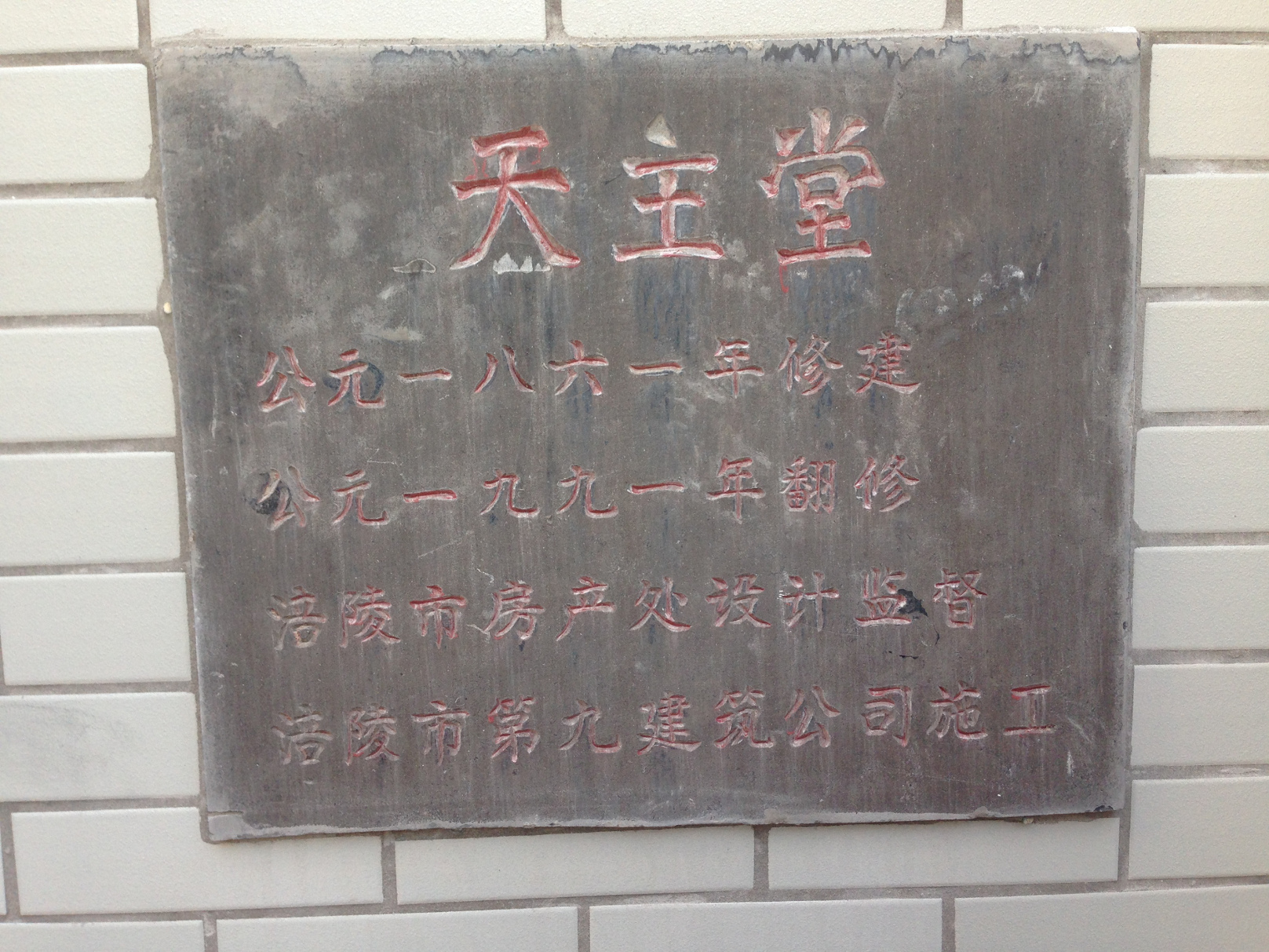
The plaque next to the church entrance - 2017

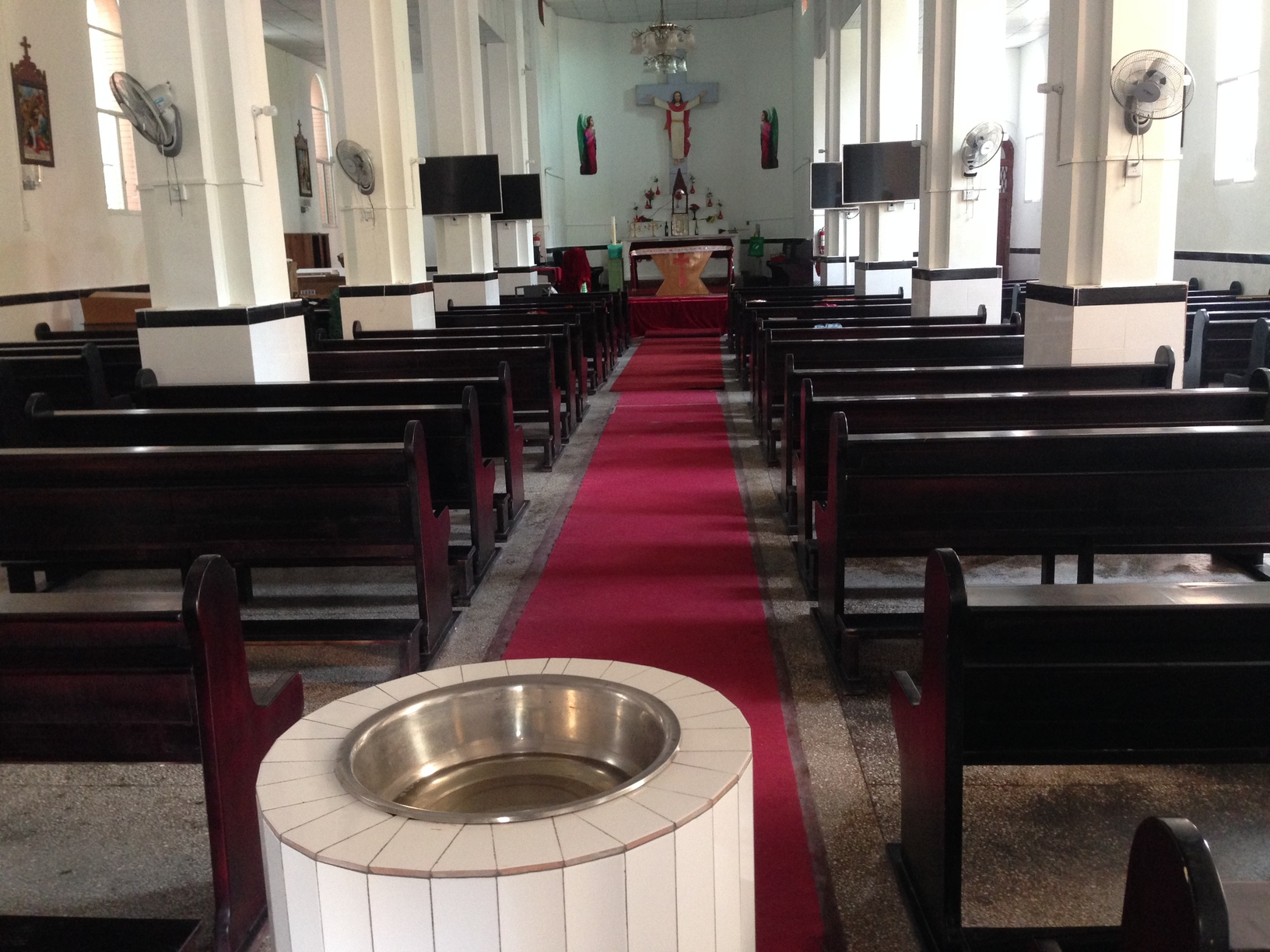
The interior of the church - 2017

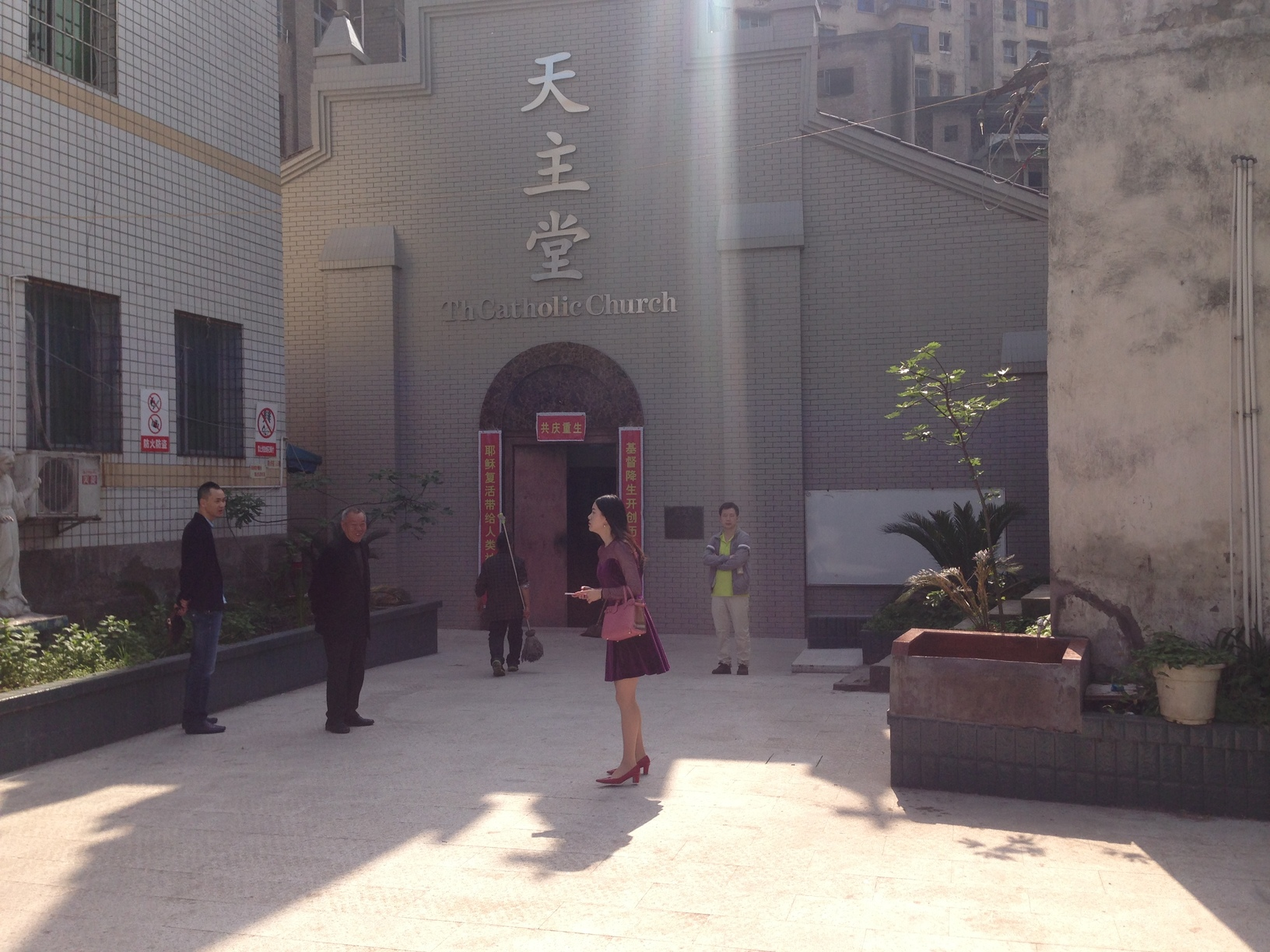
The courtyard - 2017

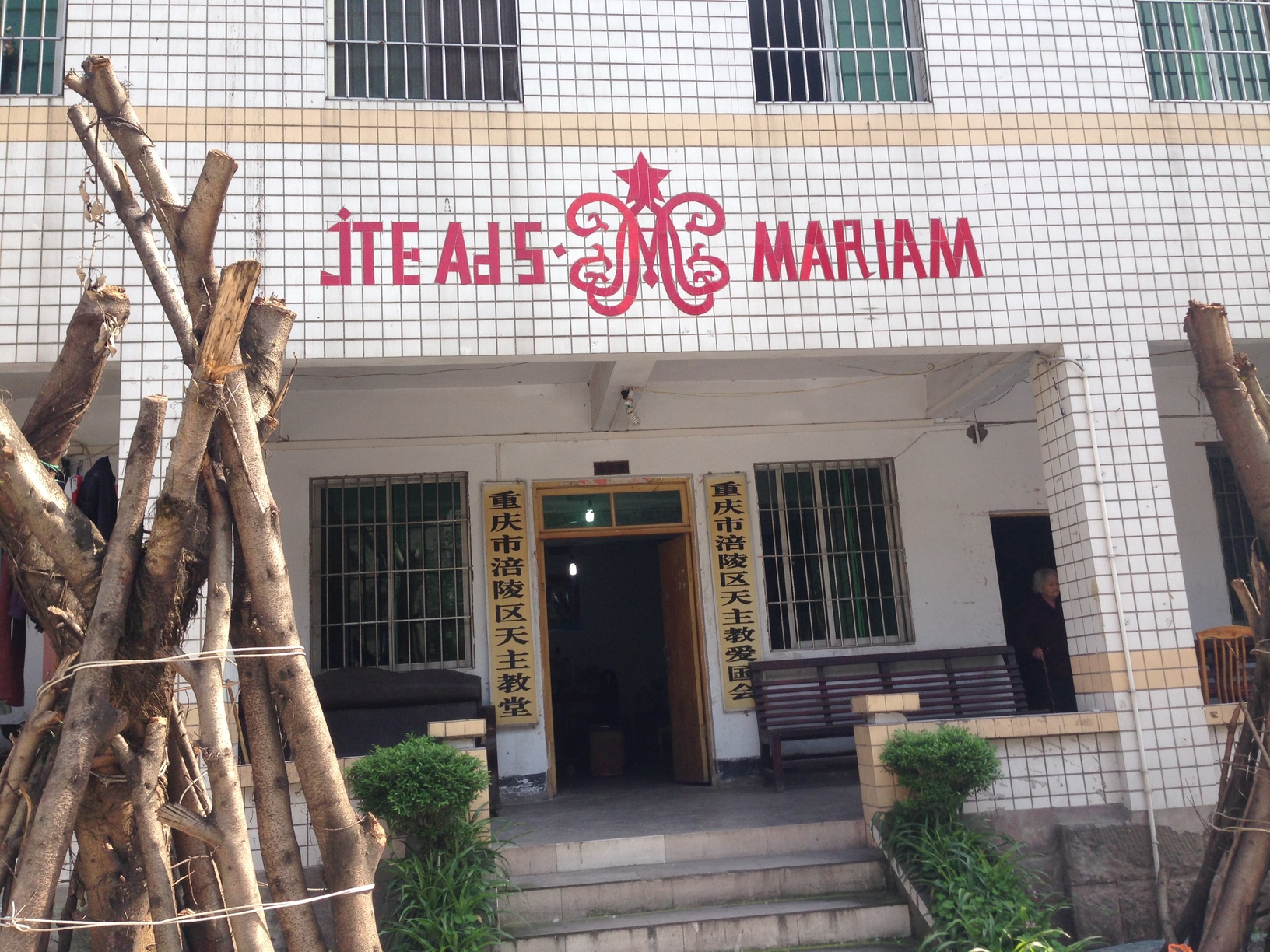
The priest's office - 2017

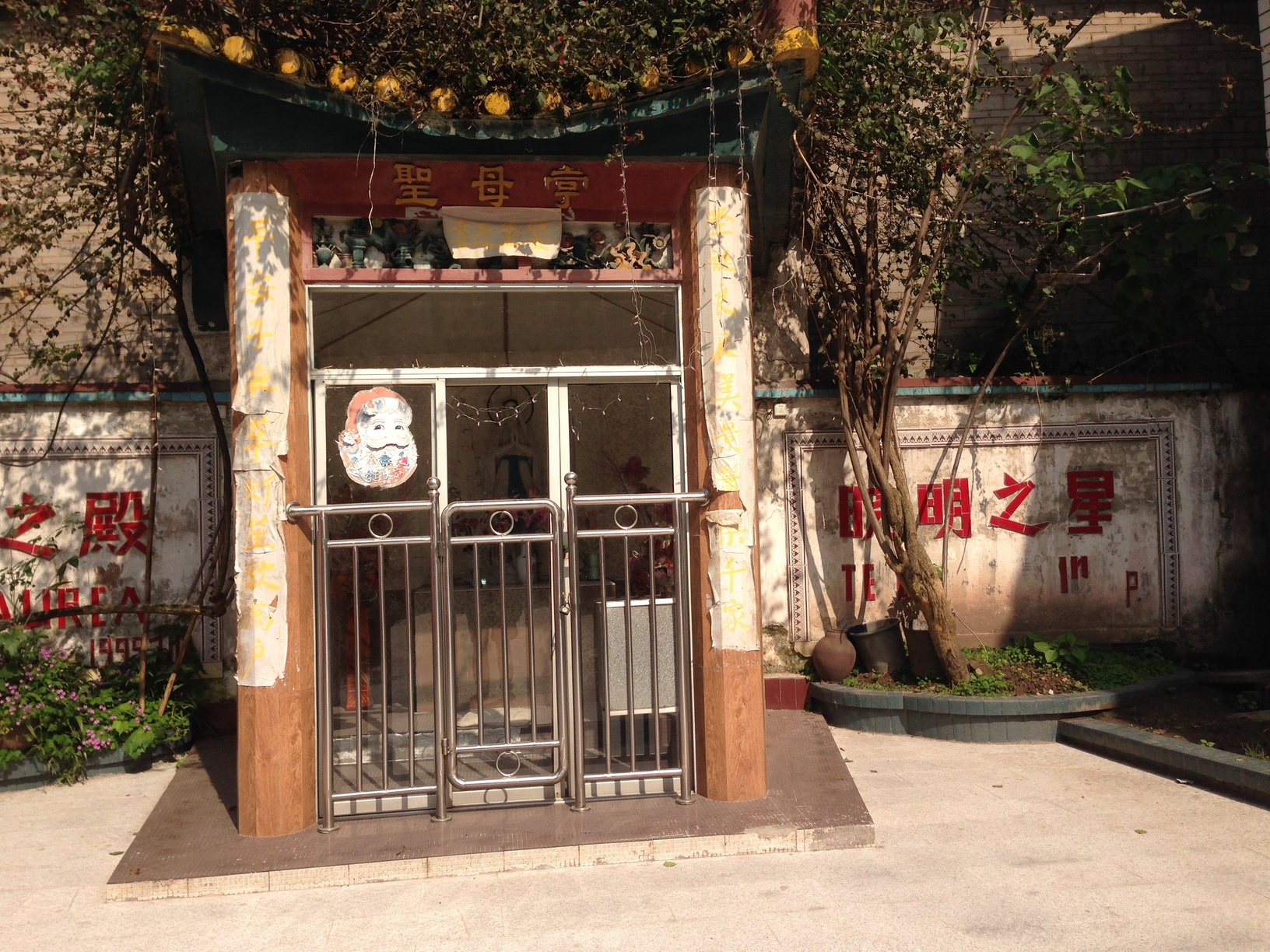
Virgin Mary chapel - 2017

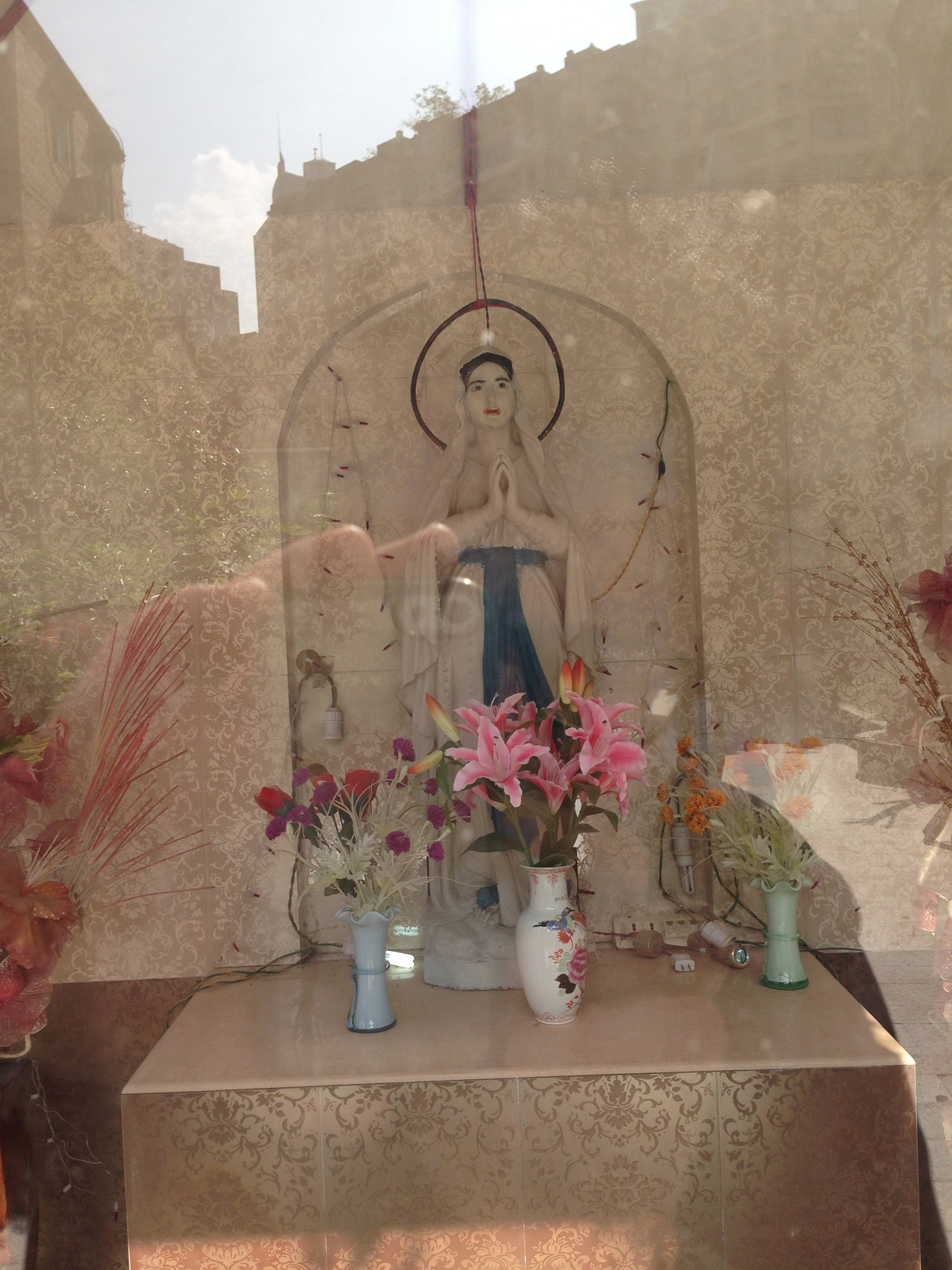
Virgin Mary - 2017

== See also ==
- Catholic Church in Sichuan

== Bibliography ==
Books

- Hessler, Peter (2001). River Town: Two Years on the Yangtze. New York: Harper Perennial. ISBN 0-06-085502-9.
