= Fuling Arch Bridge =

Fuling Arch Bridge 涪陵乌江大桥
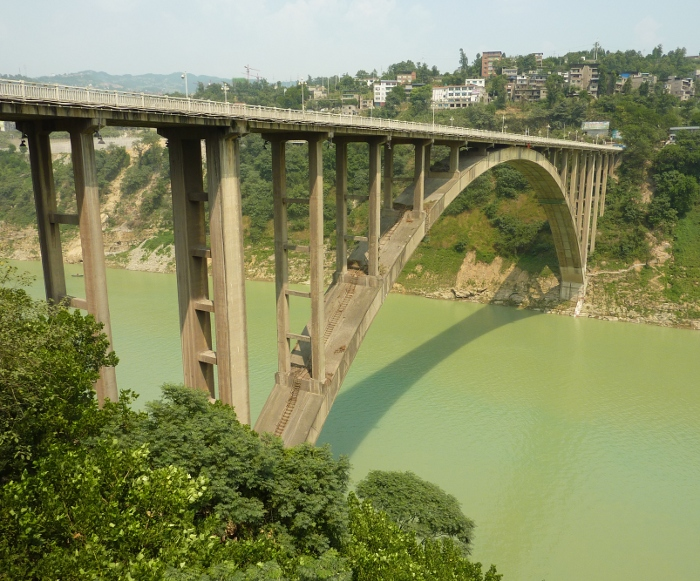
- Coordinates: 29.692139°N 107.406694°E
- Crosses: Wu River
- Locale: Fuling, Chongqing, China

Characteristics
- Design: Arch Bridge
- Material: Concrete
- Longest span: 200 metres (660 ft)

History
- Construction end: 1989

Location
- Interactive map of Fuling Arch Bridge

Fuling Arch Bridge (Chinese: 涪陵乌江大桥; pinyin: Fúlíng Wūjiāng Dàqiáo) is a concrete arch bridge in Fuling, Chongqing, China. The bridge spans 200 metres (660 ft) over the Wu River.

== See also ==
- List of longest arch bridge spans
