= Baiheliang Underwater Museum =

Underwater museum in Chongqing, China

Coordinates: 29°42′44″N 107°23′33″E

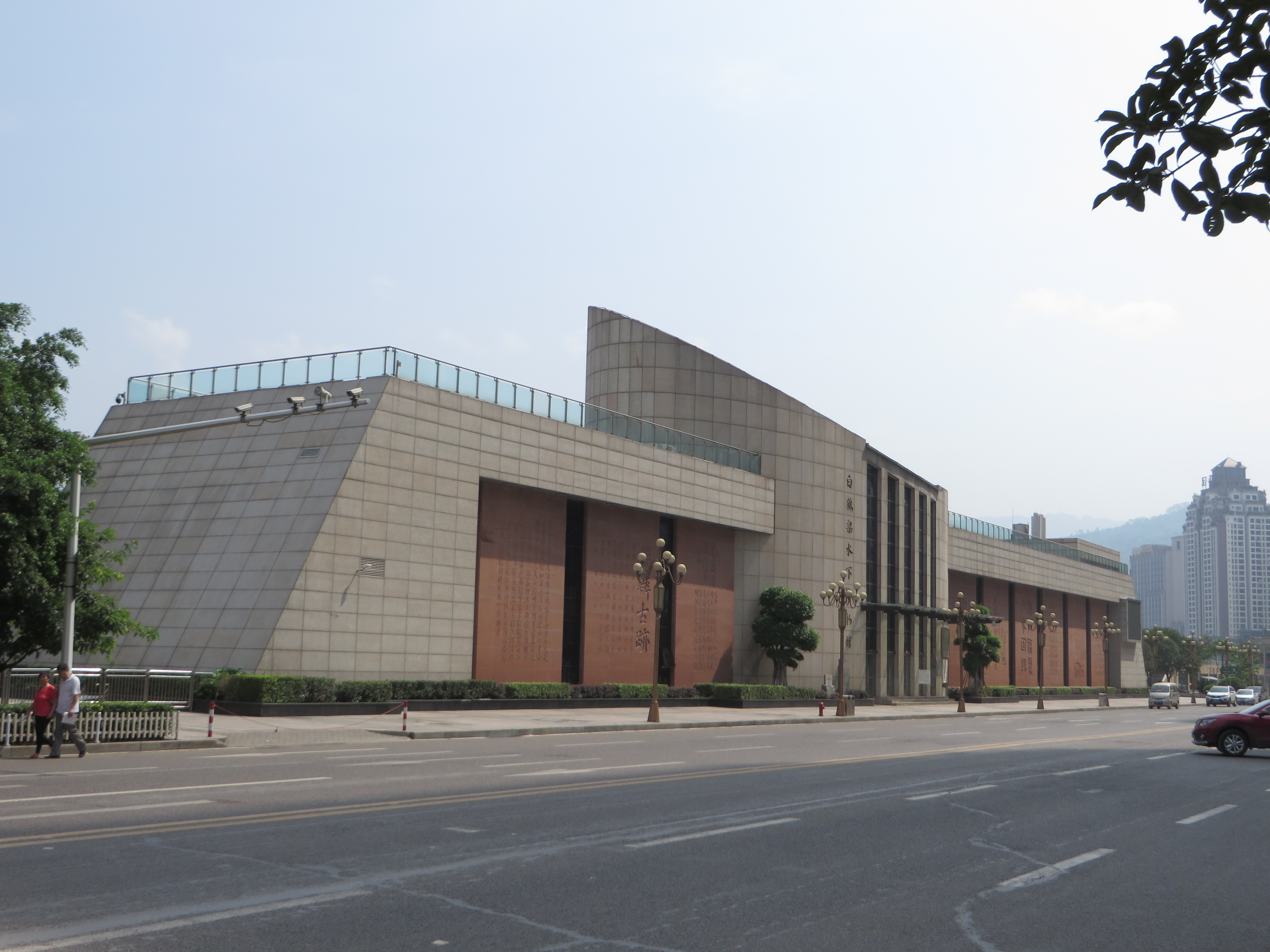
View of Baiheliang Underwater Museum building.

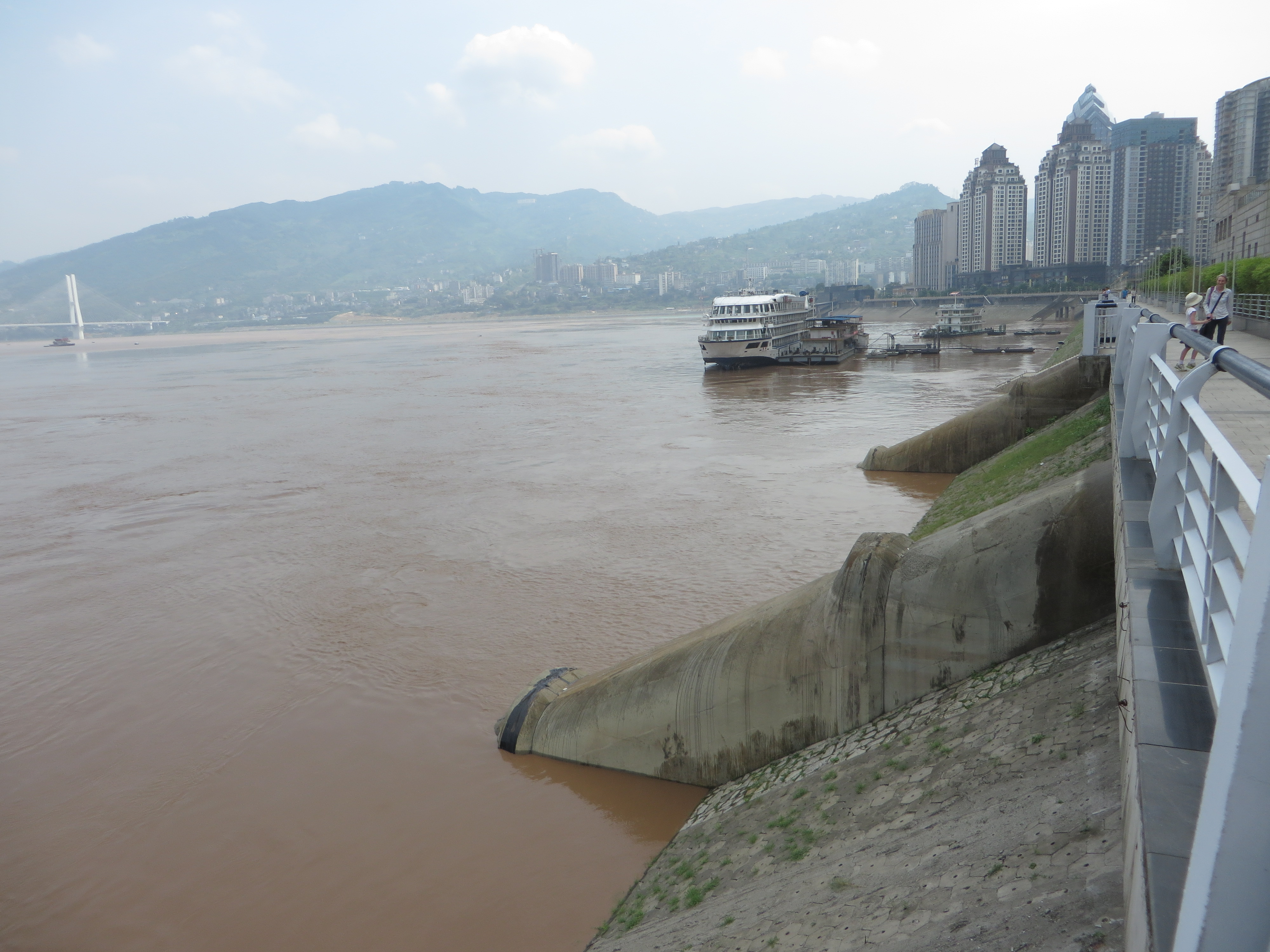
Escalator shafts down to the Baiheliang rock ledge in the Yangtze River at the museum.

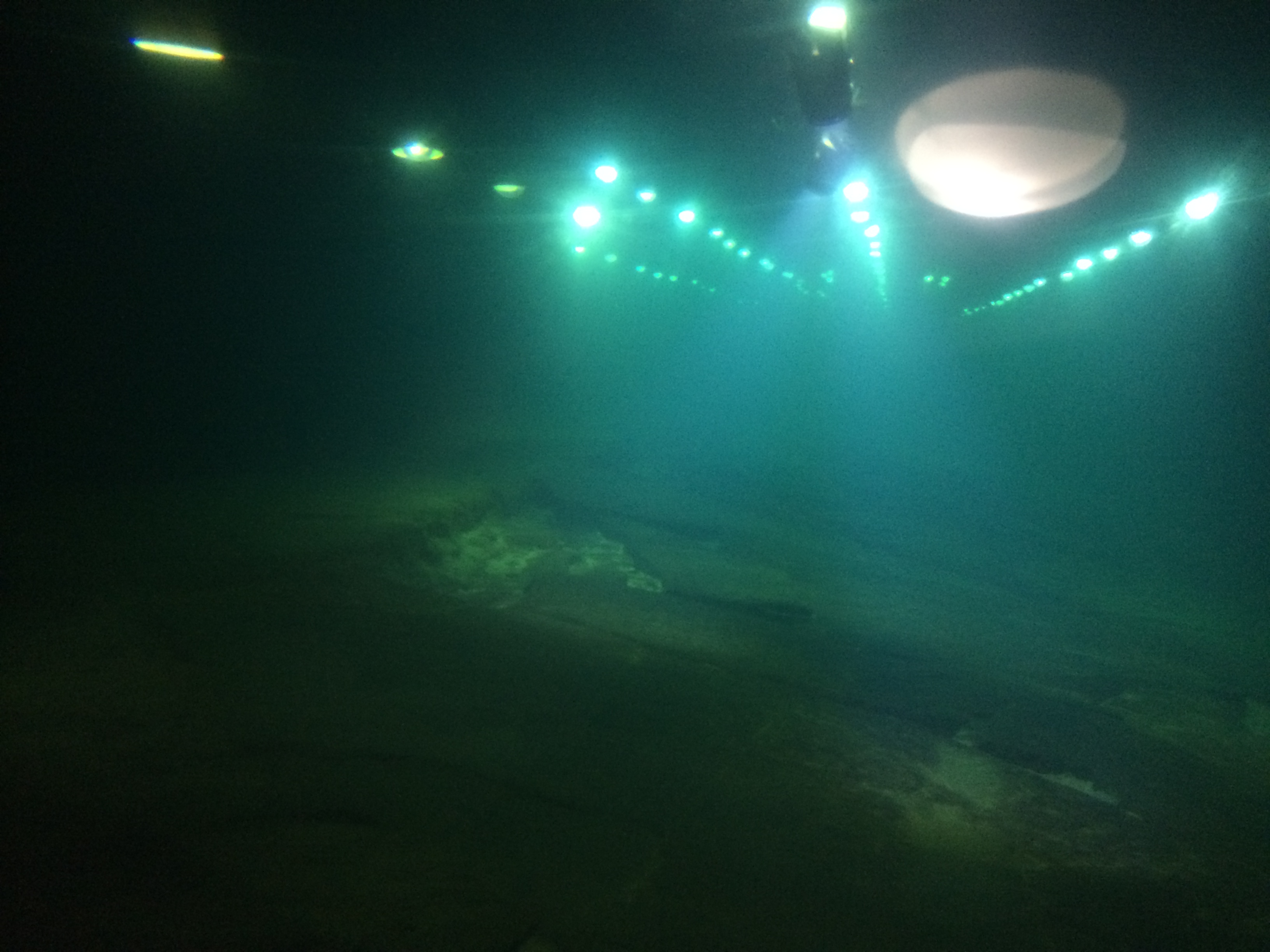
Underwater view at the museum.

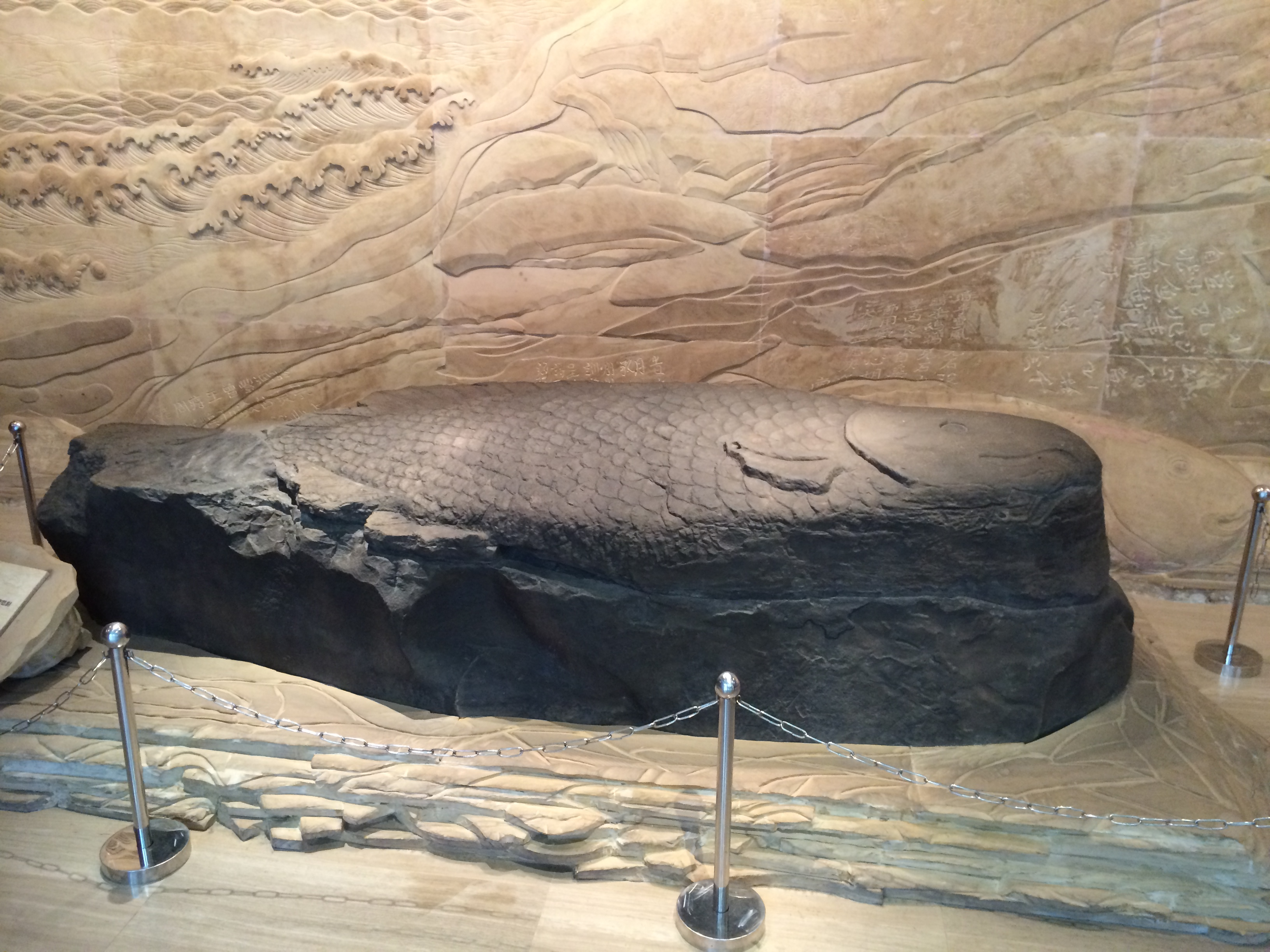
A Qing dynasty carved fish (not one of the original Tang dynasty carvings), previously placed on White Crane Ridge, and now displayed in the museum.

The Baiheliang Underwater Museum or White Crane Ridge Underwater Museum (simplified Chinese: 白鹤梁水下博物馆; traditional Chinese: 白鶴梁水下博物館) is an underwater museum built around the White Crane Ridge of Fuling District, Chongqing. It is China's first underwater museum.

The museum is located on the Yangtze River in the Three Gorges area, near the Three Gorges Dam; it opened on May 18, 2009. The construction of the museum began in 2002 and has cost around US$28 million. The main architect was Ge Xiurun of the Institute of Rock and Soil Mechanics and the Chinese Academy of Sciences.

Baiheliang (literally meaning the "White Crane Ridge") is an archeological site in northern Fuling District that has since been submerged underwater due to the building of the Three Gorges Dam. The museum displays centuries-old inscriptions recording changes in the water level of the Yangtze River for around 1,200 years. The site consists of a stone ridge that is 1,600 meters by 15 meters in size. It is now submerged under 43 meters of water.

Before the Three Gorges Dam was built, the rock ridge was only submerged during the summer and fall. Every 3–5 years, when the water level of the Yangtze dropped during the winter, the ridge and the carvings on it were exposed and visible. The stone fish figures and inscriptions recording water-levels and other information from the Tang dynasty (618–907 AD) onwards could be viewed by visitors. The carvings include 18 fish carvings, poems written calligraphically, three Bodhisattva carvings, and a crane.

From 1994, China's government departments involved with the protection of Chinese cultural heritage undertook research on the conservation of the stone inscriptions at Baiheliang. After a number of proposals, it was decided to make the site into an underwater museum.

The stone ridge has now been enclosed in an arch-shaped glass covering that is filled with purified water to ensure that pressure on both sides of the arch is the same. Two underwater channels with long escalators have been installed from the riverbank, allowing museum visitors to descend and view the stone carvings and inscriptions.

Some carvings from White Crane Ridge are also on display in the Three Gorges Museum in the city center of Chongqing.

== See also ==
- Baiheliang rock ledge
