= Dashun, Chongqing =

Dashun 大顺镇
- Town
- Location in Chongqing
- Coordinates: 29°30′14″N 107°3′36″E
- Country: People's Republic of China
- Direct-administered municipality: Chongqing
- District: Fuling District
- Time zone: UTC+8 (China Standard)

Dashun (simplified Chinese: 大顺; traditional Chinese: 大順; pinyin: Dàshùn) is a town under the administration of Fuling District, Chongqing, China. As of 2023, it administers Mingjia Residential Community (明家社区) and the following ten villages:

- Dashun Village
- Linhe Village (林和村)
- Xingnong Village (兴农村)
- Mingyue Village (明月村)
- Baiping Village (柏坪村)
- Tianbaosi Village (天宝寺村)
- Xinxing Village (新兴村)
- Datian Village (大田村)
- Shiqiang Village (石墙村)
- Qingfeng Village (清风村)

== See also ==
- List of township-level divisions of Chongqing
