= Yangtze Normal University =

University in Chongqing, China

Coordinates: 29°44′58″N 107°15′49″E

- 长江师范学院
- Type: Public
- Established: 1901
- Faculty: 720
- Administrative staff: 1,320
- Students: 13,200
- Location: Fuling District, Chongqing, China
- Campus: Suburban
- Website: yznu.cn

Chinese name
- Simplified Chinese: 长江师范学院
- Traditional Chinese: 長江師範學院
Transcriptions
Standard Mandarin
- Hanyu Pinyin: Chángjiāng Shīfàn Xuéyuàn

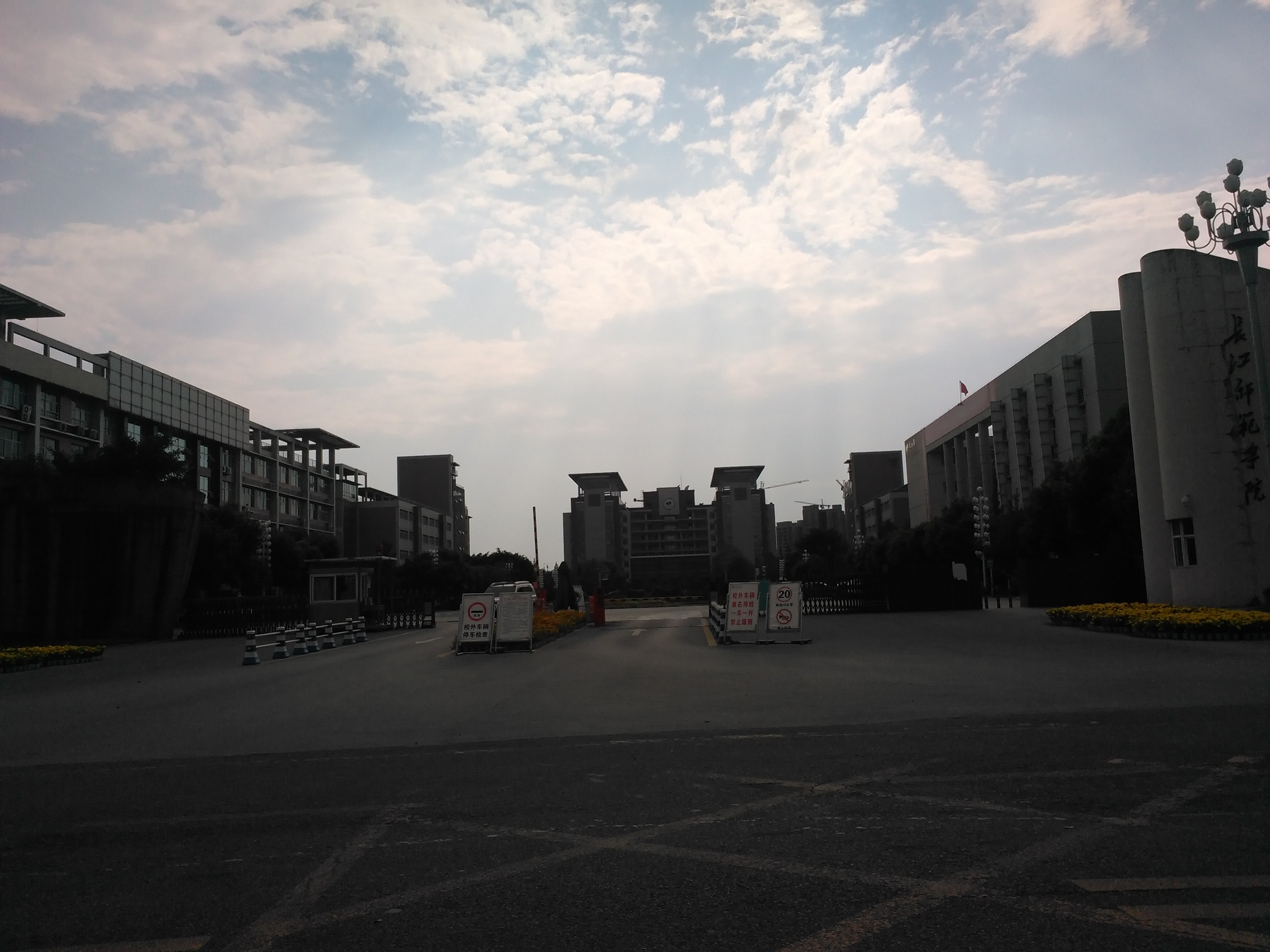
Yangtze Normal University

Yangtze Normal University (simplified Chinese: 长江师范学院; traditional Chinese: 長江師範學院; pinyin: Chángjiāng shīfàn xuéyuàn) is a full-time, comprehensive university under the administration of the Chongqing Municipal Government of the People's Republic of China. The campus is in Fuling District, at the conjunction of the Yangtze and Wu Rivers, the historic capital of the ancient Ba Tribe. It is the only teachers college in the ecological and economic zone of the Three Gorges Reservoir Area and the minority area in Southeast Chongqing.

== Campuses ==
The university has two campuses (Jiangdong and Lidu), occupying an area of 1,700 acres (6.9 km^{2}), with a built area of 400,000 square meters.

== History ==
The history of the university dates back to 1901 during the reign of the Guangxu Emperor in the late Qing dynasty, as the Fuling Official Academy of Classical Learning.

It was founded as a college in 1982 (as 涪陵专科学校), was renamed Fuling Teachers College (涪陵师范学校) in 1993, and promoted to university status in 2001 by merging Fuling Teachers College and Fuling Education Institute.

In 2006, Fuling Normal University changed its name to Yangtze Normal University with the ratification of the Ministry of Education. The university has received some honorable awards in recognition of its campus facilities, forestry programs and its commitment to community services, such as "Civilized School in Chongqing", "Chongqing 100 Top Afforested Units", "National 400 Top Afforested Units", "Advanced Units of Social Practice Activities by National Higher School Students" and "Advanced Units of Protecting Mother River".

Fuling Teachers College is the setting of Peter Hessler's memoir River Town: Two Years on the Yangtze, completed and published after he served as a U.S. Peace Corps volunteer from 1996 to 1998. At that time, Fuling Teachers College was in the Jiangdong area, while now it is in the newly built Lidu (李渡镇) neighborhood.

=== Former location ===
Fuling Teachers College, as well as Yangtze Normal University were in Fuling's Jiangdong area until the 2000s. Nowadays, Fuling Teachers College, with Yangtze Normal University, are in the Lidu (李渡镇) neighborhood. The Jiangdong campus serves as a dormitory for the elderly.

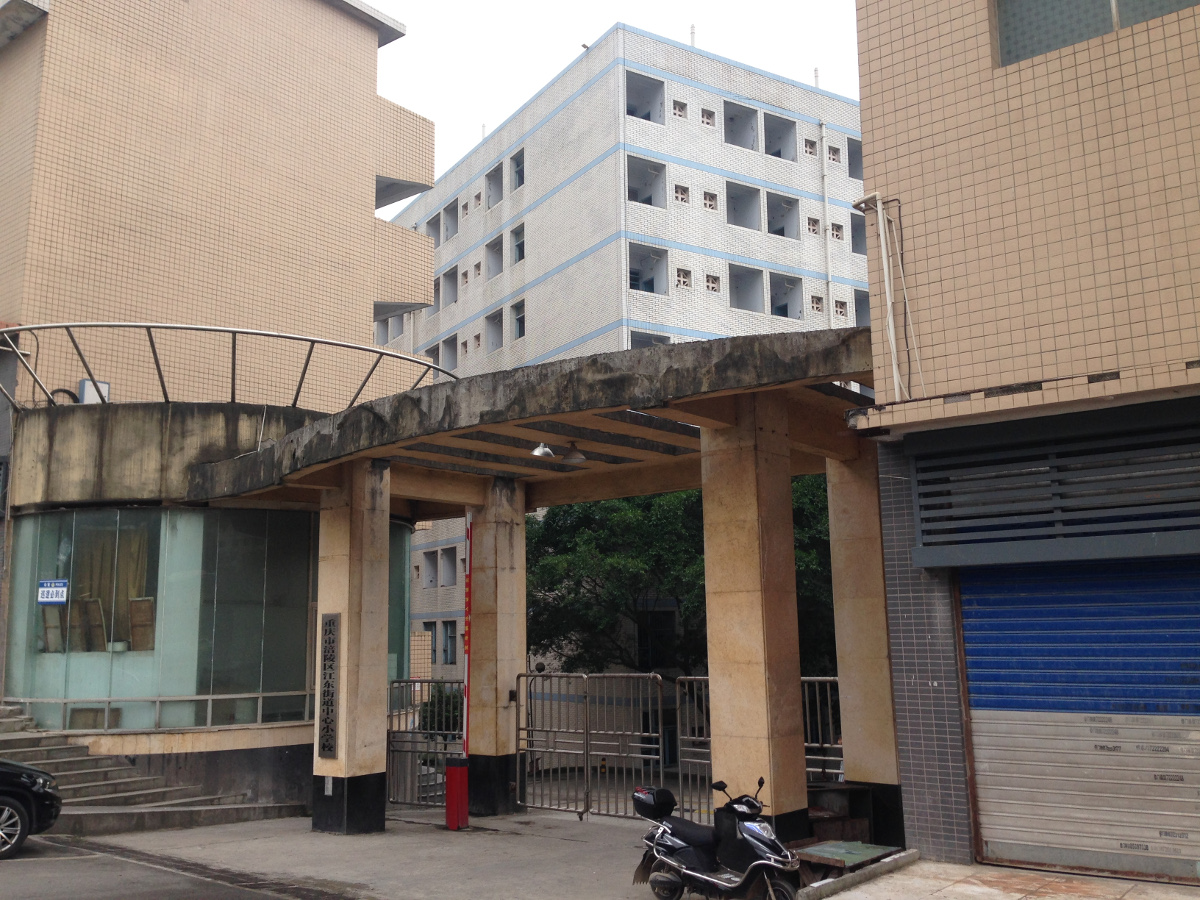
The entrance to the campus, in front of the area where Peter Hessler was living, 2017

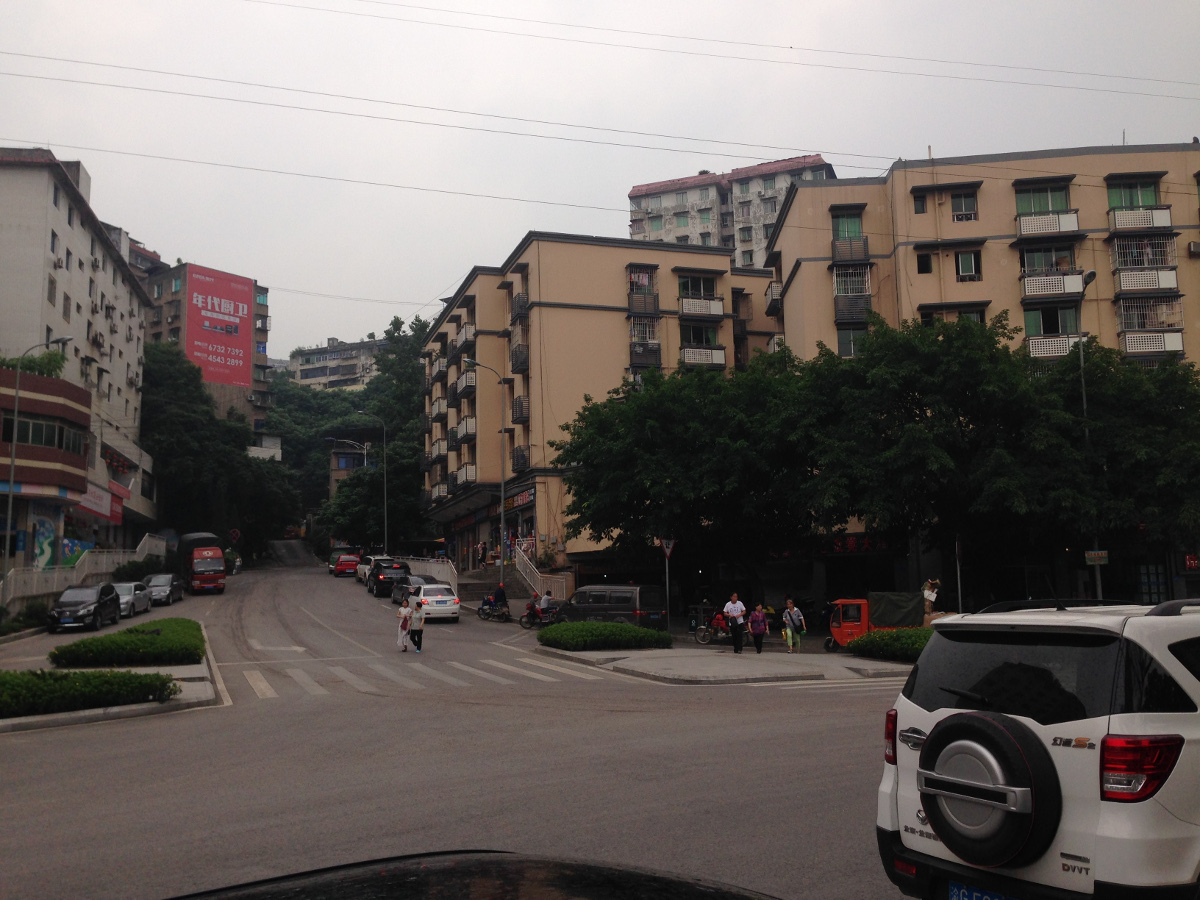
The area where Peter Hessler's apartment was, in front of the entrance to the campus, 2017

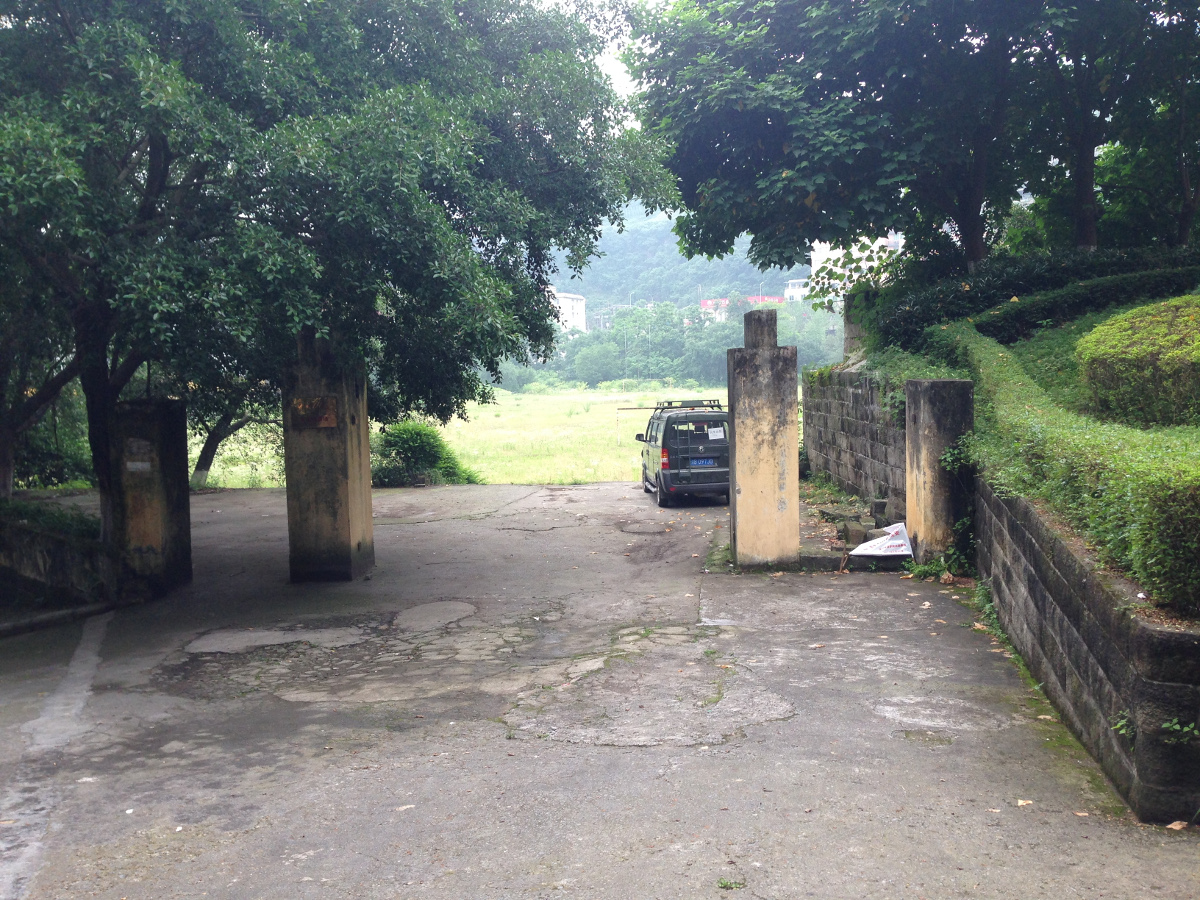
The croquet court, now abandoned, near the entrance, 2017

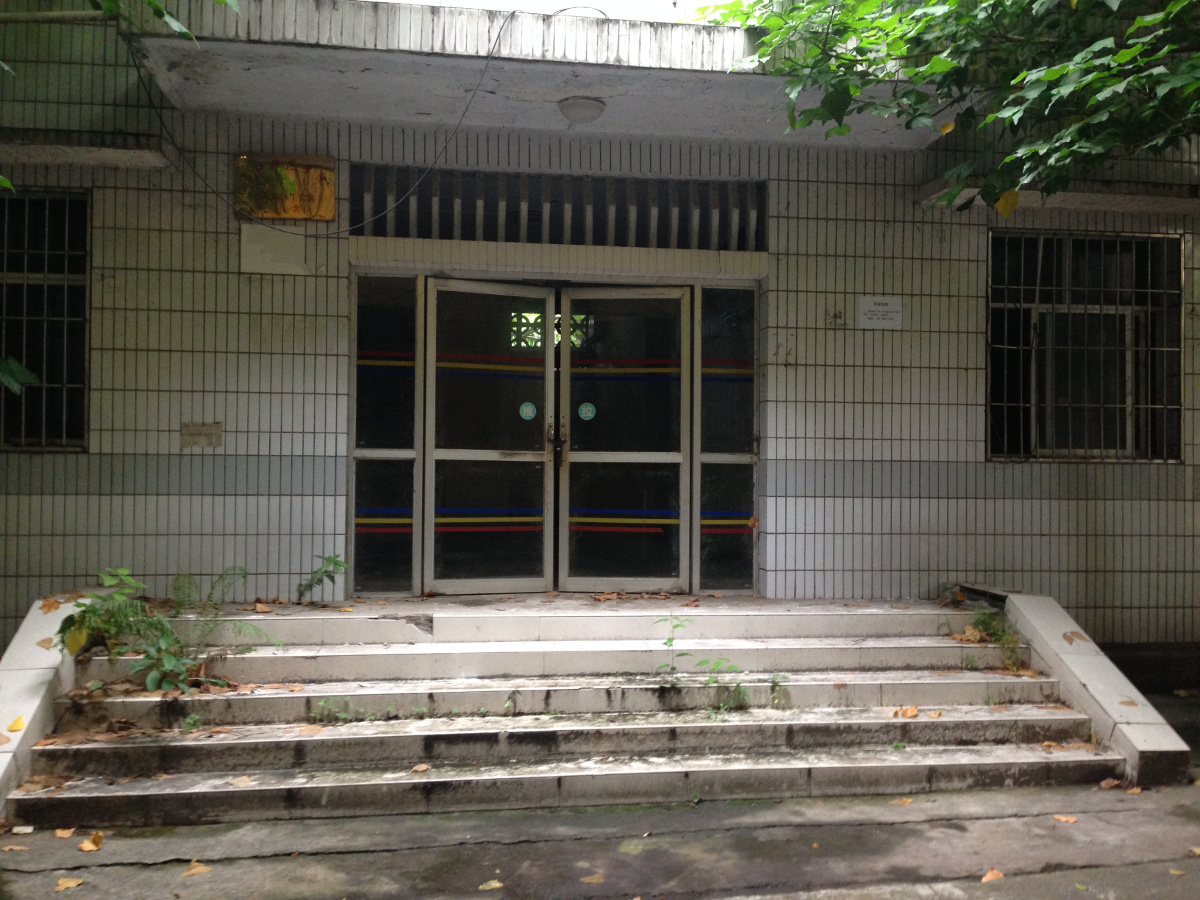
The entrance to one of the departments where Peter Hessler was teaching, 2017

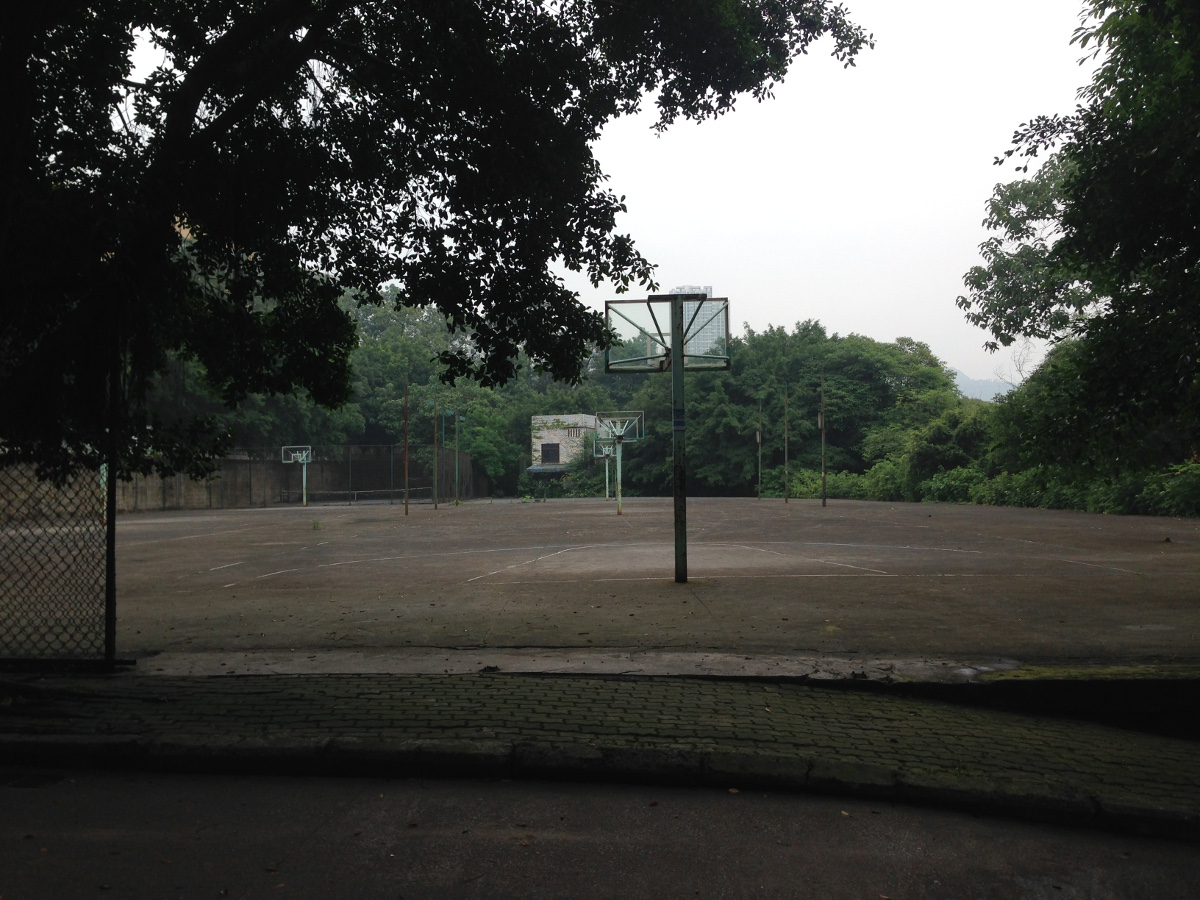
The basketball field inside the campus, 2017

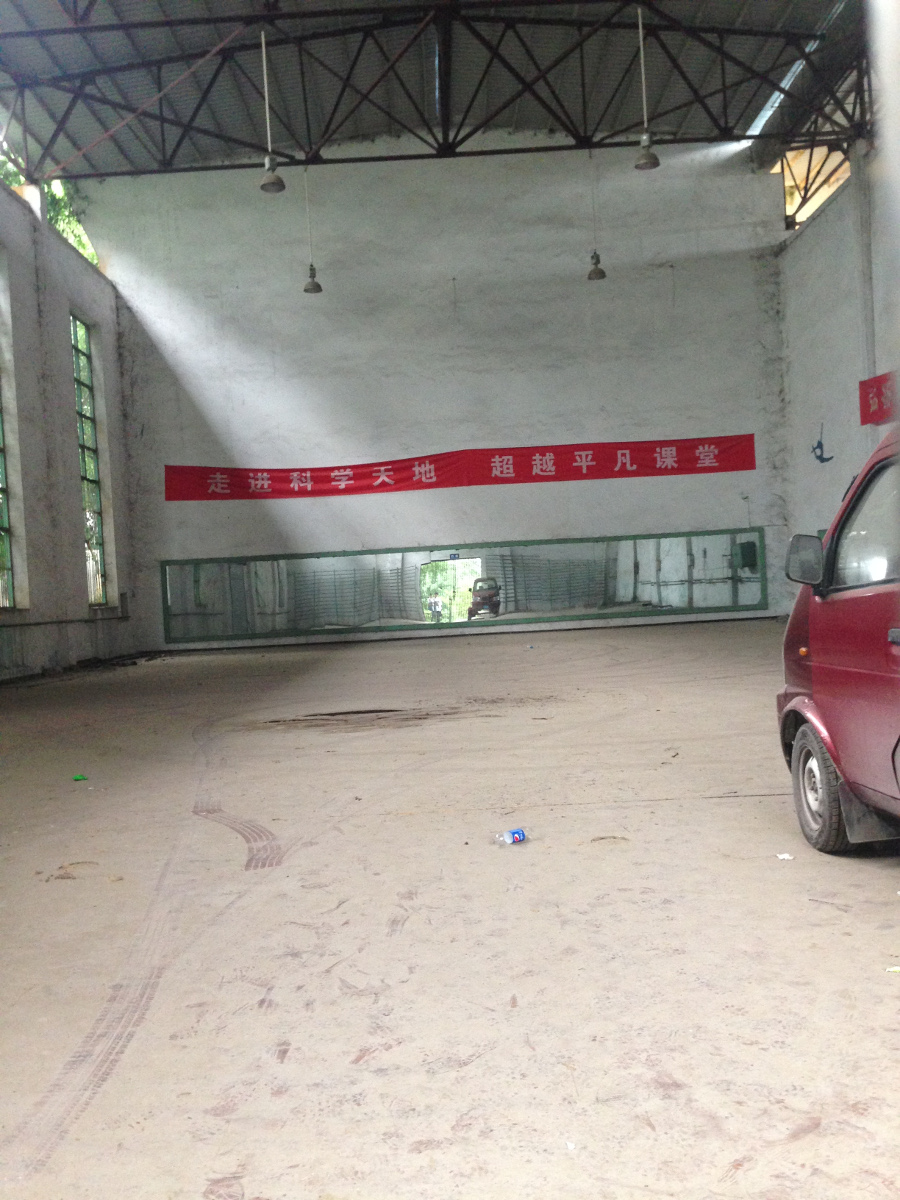
Abandoned gym inside the campus, 2017

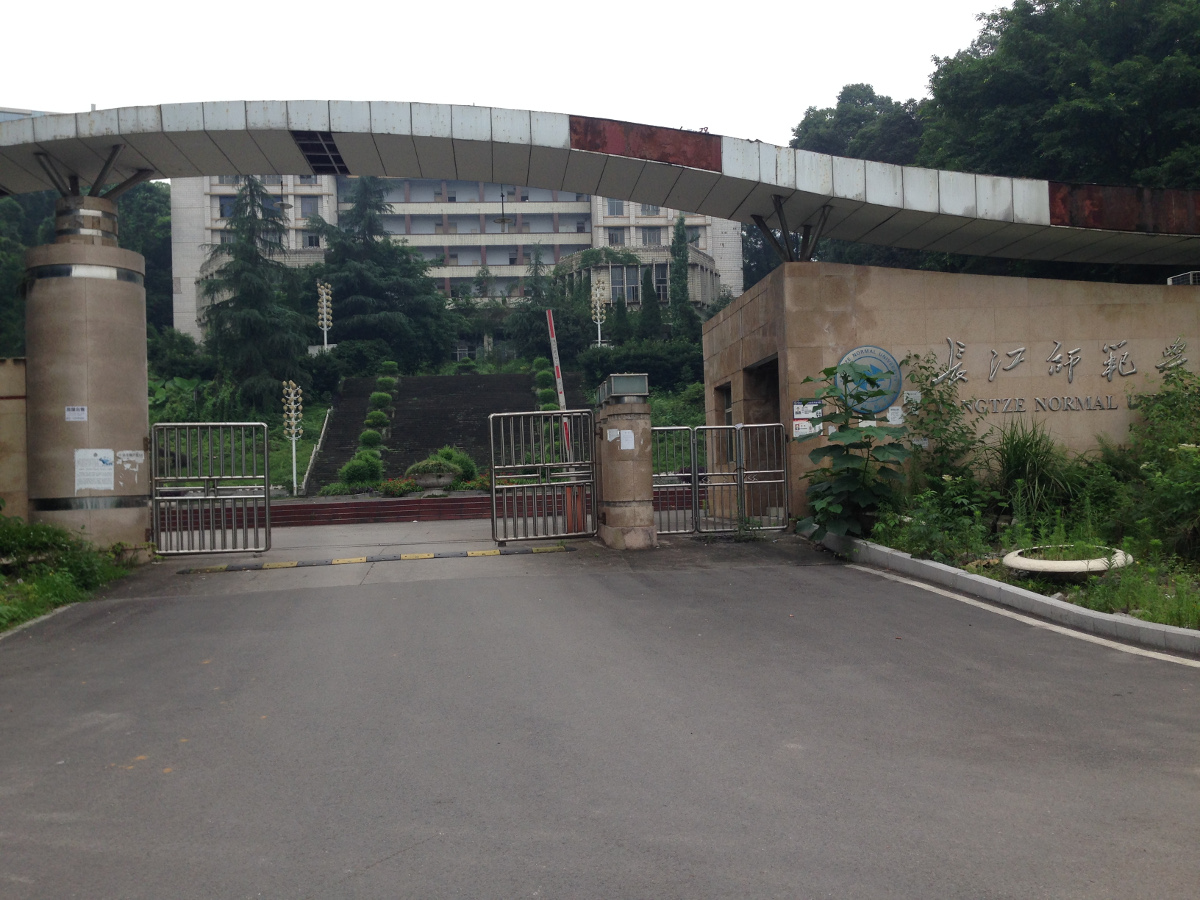
The back entrance to the campus, 2017

== Faculty and students ==
There is a full-time enrollment of over 13,200 students, who can share a variety of teaching and laboratory facilities with a value over 50 million Yuan.

The university has 1,320 faculty and staff, including 720 full-time teachers, of whom 160 are associate professors, and 41 are professors. Furthermore, there are more than 100 doctors and master's degree holders, 20 part-time professors and 4 foreign teachers.

== Programmes ==
The university has made great strides in its building and research specialties. It comprises 18 departments (or colleges), providing 35 specialties for undergraduate students.

The programs fall into eight disciplines: literature, science, law, engineering, economics, and science of management, education and historiography. There are five key disciplines of the university level: Modern Chinese Literature, Ancient Chinese Literature, Education of Marxist Theory and Education in Ideology and Politics, Physical Chemistry, and Condensed Matter Physics.

== Research ==
There are 11 research institutes in the university, including the "Three Gorges Culture and Customs Research Center", the "Wujiang Economic and Culture Research Center" and the "Primary Education Research Center". It is the only Center of Preparatory Courses for Ethnic Minority Education in Chongqing and is the Research Center of Immigration Training for the Three Gorges Area, the Center for Teacher Training for Primary and Middle School in Chongqing and the key research center for Humanities and Social Sciences in Chongqing.

Since 2001, more than 70 students have received national awards in National English Contest for College Students, National Mathematics Contest in Modeling, National Teaching Skills Contest for the English Majors of Higher Normal Schools and National Applied Information Technology Contest.

== Alumni ==
Since 1982, more than 30,000 students have graduated from this university and become the backbone teachers and the leaders in schools in Southeast Chongqing. Since 2001, the university has trained over 7000 teachers for primary and middle school in Chongqing. This is a tremendous contribution to local economic and social development. At the same time, the university has trained many qualified teachers for Tibet and the minority area in Southeast Chongqing.

== Facilities ==
The library, equipped with an electronic reading-room with 120 seats, has a collection of over 1,000,000 books and 160,000 copies of E-books, and subscribes to more than 2,000 Chinese and overseas periodicals.

Additionally, there is a biochemistry experiment building, a complex laboratory building, a teaching building for art students, an education and training center, an athletic field with a 400-meter standard track, a gymnasium, and a basketball hall.
