= New International Land-Sea Trade Corridor =

The New International Land-Sea Trade Corridor is a trade and logistics passage with an operational hub centered on Chongqing. According to Xinhua, the corridor was connected to 190 ports in 90 countries in September 2019. It is one of the many corridors under the Belt and Road Initiative, a global economic connectivity program organized by China.

The corridor is a joint project of western Chinese provinces (Chongqing, Guangxi, Guizhou, Gansu, Qinghai, Xinjiang, Yunnan and Ningxia) and Singapore under the government-to-government framework of the China-Singapore (Chongqing) Demonstration Initiative on Strategic Connectivity.

== Routes ==
The route for the corridor is the railway from Chongqing to ports at the Beibu Gulf in Guangxi like the port of Qinzhou. The cargo is shipped from the Beibu Gulf to other ports worldwide. Examples in Chinese state media of the trade enabled by the corridor are potatoes from Gansu sold to Vietnam and pitaya from Vietnam found in the supermarkets of Chongqing.

From the center of the hub in Chongqing, there are connections in other directions. Rail and truck lines also connect Chongqing to other Belt and Road Initiative corridors in Southeast Asia like the China-Myanmar Economic Corridor, Laos-China Economic Corridor, and Two Corridors, One Belt (Vietnam). Chongqing is also connected with a railway line going to Europe through Central Asia via the New Eurasian Land Bridge.

== Customs clearance ==
The corridor puts emphasis on faster customs clearance. Fifteen regional customs under the General Administration of Customs of China entered into a memorandum in 2019 to cooperate on the corridor.
