= Two Corridors, One Belt =

Infrastructure project in Vietnam and China

The Two Corridors, One Belt (abbreviated as TCOB) is a connectivity initiative involving Vietnam and China. It is a part of the Belt and Road Initiative, a Chinese global development initiative fostering connectivity especially across Eurasia.

== Planning ==
The TCOB was first proposed in 2004 by then Vietnamese Prime Minister Phan Văn Khải during a state visit to China. The joint communiqué produced from the visit called for a joint economic commission to cooperate on discussing "building the 'Kunming – Laojie – Hanoi – Hai Phong – Quang Ninh' and 'Nanning – Liangshan – Hanoi – Hai Phong – Quang Ninh' economic corridors and the Beibu Bay economic rim.

The TCOB is included in the list of corridors and projects of the Belt and Road Initiative. The list is annexed to a joint communiqué of state leaders including Vietnamese Prime Minister Nguyễn Xuân Phúc who attended the 2nd Belt and Road Initiative Forum in April 2019.

Despite continuous affirmations of the Vietnamese government to develop TCOB, progress has stalled due to tensions over disputes in the South China Sea and border and naval clashes between 1979 and 1991. Sentiment among Vietnamese people to Chinese investment is generally negative. There is even sensitivity by the Vietnamese government to blending together the profiles of the TCOP and Belt and Road Initiative because of public perception.

== Projects ==
The only infrastructure project counted as part of the TCOP is the Hanoi Metro's Line 2A. The $868 million project is mostly financed by preferential loans from the Export Import Bank of China with the remainder of funding from the Vietnamese government.

Vietnam participates in cooperation frameworks of the Belt and Road Initiative outside of economic corridors. The country is a member of the Silk Road International Alliance of Art Museums and Galleries, an organization of the National Art Museum of China and 21 art museums or major fine arts institutions. It is a member of mechanisms for agricultural cooperation, trade facilitation, and accounting standards.
