= Baiheliang =

Archaeological site in China

Coordinates: 29.716°N 107.384°E

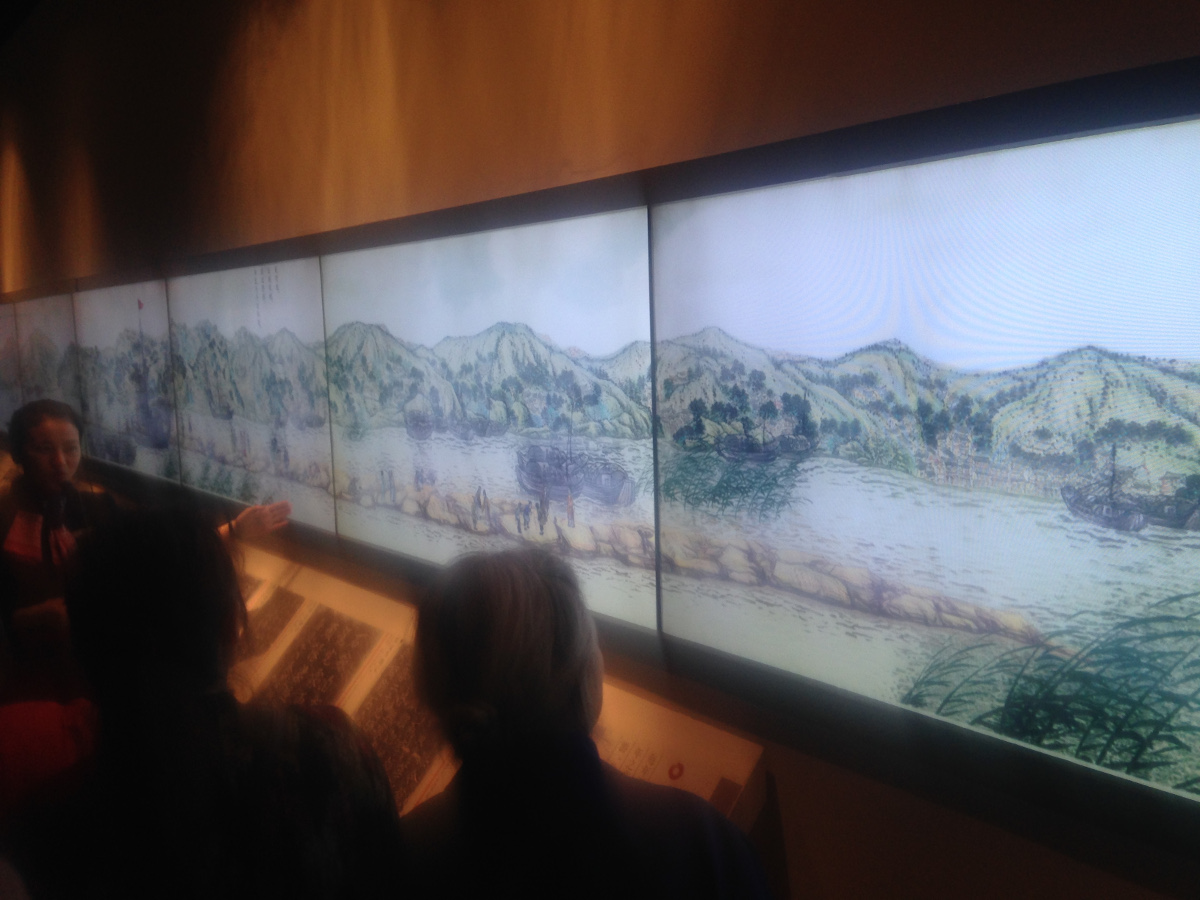
Poster displayed at the Baiheliang Underwater Museum showing the configuration of the White Crane Ridge before the construction of the Three Gorges Dam

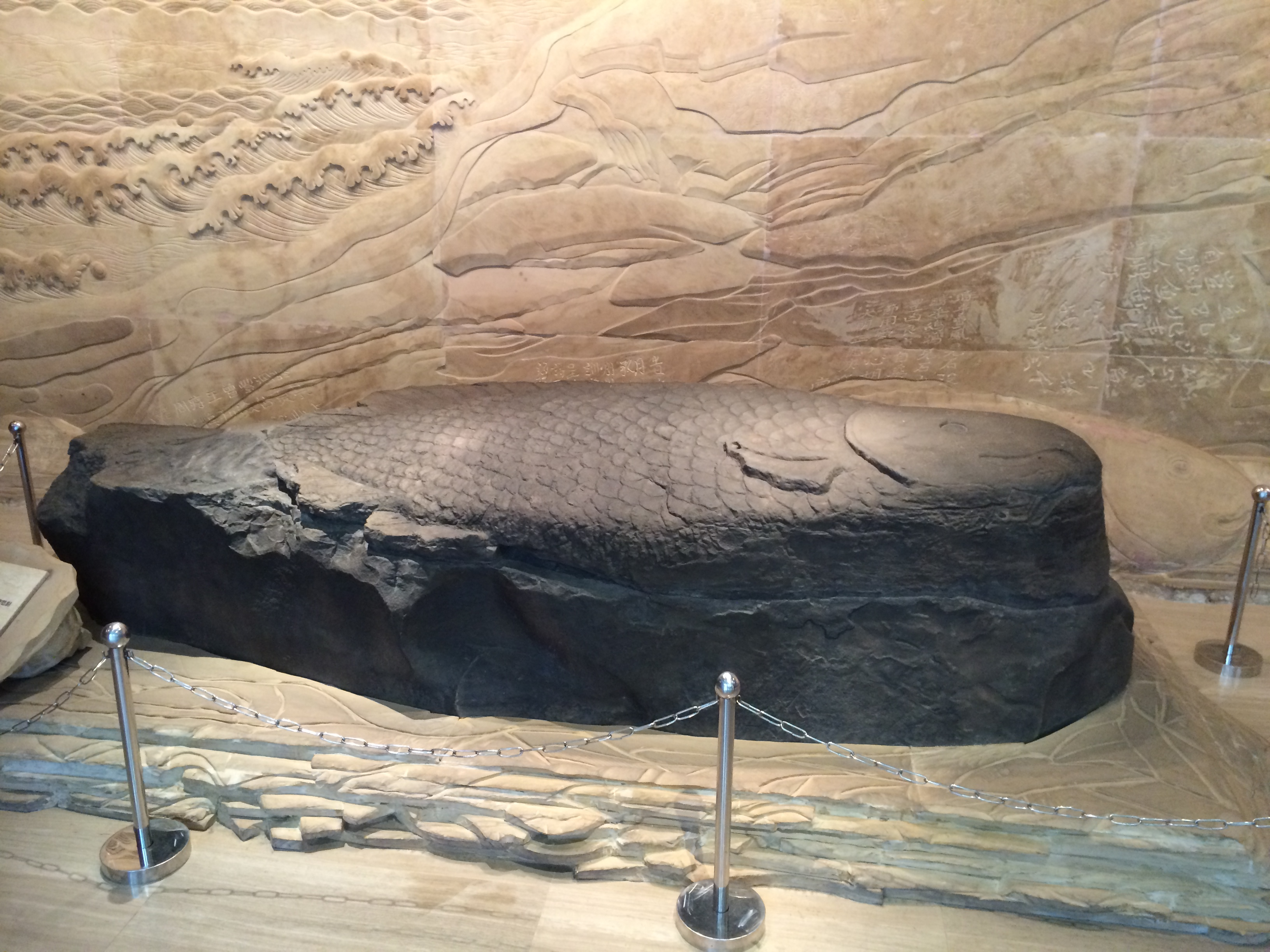
A Qing dynasty carved fish, previously placed on the White Crane Ridge, now displayed in the museum.

Baiheliang (simplified Chinese: 白鹤梁; traditional Chinese: 白鶴梁; pinyin: Báihèliáng; lit. 'White Crane Ridge') is a rock outcrop in Fuling District, Chongqing, People's Republic of China, that parallels the flow of the Yangtze River.

In the past, Baiheliang served as an ancient device for measuring water levels of the Yangtze in China, the equivalent of a hydrometric station. The horizontal rock ledge, 1.6 km long and ten to fifteen metres wide, lay submerged under water most of the year, showing its upper face above water only during the low-water season of winter and early spring. The eyes of fish carved on the stone indicate the lowest water levels of the Yangtze River, which made the site a precious hydrographic marker. Baiheliang has been submerged to a depth of over 30 metres behind the Three Gorges Dam.

Engraved in the rock are 163 inscriptions and pictures, which include 114 hydrological annotations, which give detailed records of water levels in the river over 1,200 years, since the first year of the Tang dynasty Guangde era, 763; the assembled inscriptions and fish carvings, taken together, formed the longest such sequence in the world. One fish carving originally carved in the Tang dynasty was re-carved at a moment of lowest water in 1685: modern measurements recorded the elevation of their eyes, 137.91 metres, almost the same as that of the zero point of the modern water level gauge.

The fish carvings and hydrological inscriptions were virtually unknown in the West until the 1970s, when Chinese experts presented photos of these two fish and hydrological data of Fuling for the past 1,200 years at an international hydrological symposium held in the UK.

The best-known of the fish carvings was a 2.8-metre carp, carved from a section of freestone. Hundreds of poetical homages to the place were inscribed in rock faces, which have disappeared beneath the rising waters as the dam has been completed. In 2003, Xinhua News Agency, the People's Republic's official press agency, headlined the on-line story, June 10, "Accident-maker reef no longer threatens Yangtze navigation".

The inscriptions on the "White Crane Ridge" are on display in the Baiheliang Underwater Museum, which opened to the public on May 18, 2009. Some carvings are also on display in the Three Gorges Museum in the city centre of Chongqing.

== See also ==
- Baiheliang Underwater Museum
- Nilometer
