= River Town: Two Years on the Yangtze =

2001 book by Peter Hessler

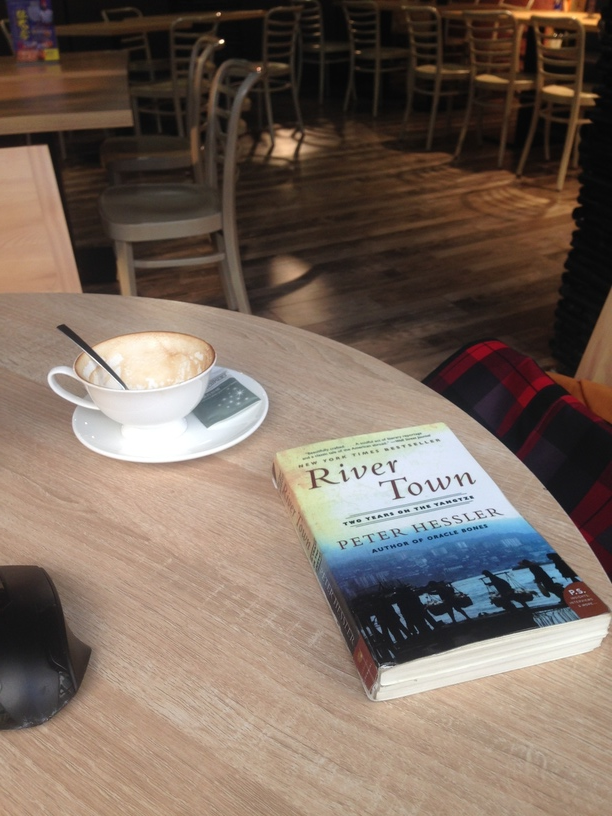
- A copy of Peter Hessler's book River Town in a Fuling restaurant
- Author: Peter Hessler
- Language: English
- Subject: Chinese memoirs about two years spent in Fuling, China as an English teacher
- Genre: nonfiction
- Set in: Fuling District, Chongqing, West China
- Published: 2001
- Publisher: Harper Perennial
- Publication place: United States of America
- Pages: 399
- Awards: Kiriyama Prize; New York Times Notable Book
- ISBN: 0-06-085502-9
- Website: Peter Hessler's Official Web Page

River Town: Two Years on the Yangtze is a 2001 memoir by Peter Hessler. It documents his Peace Corps teaching assignment at Fuling Teachers College in Fuling, Sichuan/Chongqing, (Note: Fuling was initially a part of Sichuan Province, but was moved into the newly-established Chongqing Municipality, a province-level entity, in 1997.) which started in 1996 and lasted for two years.

== Overview ==
The book is a memoir of Hessler's experience in Fuling, working as a Peace Corps volunteer at Fuling Teachers College. The main people featured in the memoir are Hessler's fellow American teacher Adam, Chinese teachers Liao and Kong who teach the Americans Mandarin, and Anne, one of Peter's brightest students.

Hessler's stay in Fuling coincided with Deng Xiaoping's death and the Handover of Hong Kong (1997), and he describes the reaction of the people to the historic events. The book describes stories of the town's residents, including the priest of the Fuling Catholic Church, Li Hǎiruò.

Each chapter includes a short annex which describes Fuling's most notable places in the present tense, whilst normal chapters are set in the past and use the past simple, present perfect and past perfect tenses.

Hessler uses many Chinese terms verbatim to refer to common things or people, to make them look more typical of Chinese culture. For instance, foreigners are often referred to as waiguoren, girls are called xiaojies, porters are called stick-stick soldiers (translated literally from the Sichuanese term 棒棒军 bàngbàngjūn), and so on.

== Reception ==
The book won the Kiriyama Prize and it has also been a New York Times Notable Book. Marlene Chamberlain of Booklist concluded that "This is a colorful memoir from a Peace Corps volunteer who came away with more understanding of the Chinese than any foreign traveler has a right to expect."

== See also ==
- White Crane Ridge

== Bibliography ==
- Hessler, Peter (2001). River Town: Two Years on the Yangtze. New York: Harper Perennial. ISBN 0-06-085502-9.
