= Peter Hessler =

American writer and journalist

- Born: June 14, 1969 (age 57)
- Education: Princeton University; Mansfield College, Oxford
- Occupations: Writer, journalist, runner
- Spouse: Leslie T. Chang
- Children: 2
- Writing career
- Pen name: 何伟 (Hé Wěi) (in China)
- Language: English, Chinese, Egyptian Arabic
- Notable works: River Town; Oracle Bones; Country Driving; Strange Stones
- Notable awards: MacArthur Fellowship; Kiriyama Prize; Nominated for National Book Award for Nonfiction

Peter Benjamin Hessler (born June 14, 1969) is an American writer and journalist. He is the author of four books about China and has contributed numerous articles to The New Yorker and National Geographic, among other publications. In 2011, Hessler received a MacArthur Fellowship in recognition of his "keenly observed accounts of ordinary people responding to the complexities of life in such rapidly changing societies as Reform Era China."

== Early life and education ==
Hessler grew up in Columbia, Missouri, and graduated from Hickman High School in 1988. In 1992, he graduated from Princeton University with an A.B. in English after completing a senior thesis titled "Dead Man's Shoes and Other Stories." During his junior year, he studied in John McPhee's writing seminar. After graduating from Princeton, Hessler received a Rhodes Scholarship to study English language and literature at Mansfield College, University of Oxford.

The summer before graduating from Princeton, Hessler worked as a researcher for the Kellogg Foundation in southeastern Missouri. He wrote an extensive ethnography about the small town of Sikeston, which was published in Human Organization, a journal of the Society for Applied Anthropology.

== Career ==
Hessler joined the Peace Corps in 1996 and was sent to China for two years to teach English at Fuling Teachers College, in a small city near the Yangtze River in Sichuan, later Chongqing municipality. (Note: Fuling was initially a part of Sichuan Province, but was moved into the newly-established Chongqing Municipality in 1997.) He later worked in China as freelance writer for publications such as the Wall Street Journal, the Boston Globe, the South China Morning Post, and National Geographic. Hessler joined The New Yorker as a staff writer in 2000 and served as foreign correspondent until 2007.

Hessler has written four books on China. River Town: Two Years on the Yangtze (2001) is a Kiriyama Prize-winning book about his experiences in two years as a Peace Corps volunteer teaching English in China. Oracle Bones: A Journey Through Time in China (2006) features a series of parallel episodes featuring his former students, a Uighur dissident who fled to the U.S., and the archaeologist Chen Mengjia who committed suicide during the Cultural Revolution. His third book, Country Driving: A Journey from Farm to Factory (2010), is a record of Hessler's journeys driving a rented car from rural northern Chinese counties to the factory towns of southern China, and the significant economic and industrial growth taking place there. While his stories are about ordinary people's lives in China and not motivated by politics, they nevertheless touch upon political issues or the lives of people who encountered problems during the Cultural Revolution, one example being that of the story of the archaeologist Chen Mengjia and his wife, poet and translator Zhao Luorui. In 2013, he published Strange Stones: Dispatches from East and West (2013), which, like his previous works, also covers China's ordinary people and life.

Hessler left China in 2007 and settled in Ridgway, Colorado, where he continued to publish articles in The New Yorker on topics including the Peace Corps in Nepal and small towns in Colorado.

In October 2011, Hessler and his family moved to Cairo, where he covered the Middle East for The New Yorker. In an interview upon being named a MacArthur Fellow in September 2011, he expressed his intention to spend much of the next year learning Arabic. He said he envisioned spending five or six years in the Middle East. While living there, he and his wife both learned Egyptian Arabic. In 2019, he published The Buried: An Archaeology of the Egyptian Revolution, a book detailing his experiences of Egypt during the Arab Spring.

In August 2019, Hessler and his family moved to Chengdu in southwest China. He taught nonfiction writing at Sichuan University - Pittsburgh Institute. During his time in Chengdu, Hessler wrote several pieces for The New Yorker about how China handled the COVID-19 pandemic. Because Sichuan University-Pittsburgh Institute declined to renew his teaching contract, after some of his students reported Hessler's class, he and his family moved back to Colorado at the end of the first semester of 2021.

Since 2024, Hessler has coached track at a high school in Ridgway, Colorado.

== Personal life ==
Hessler is married to journalist and writer Leslie T. Chang. They have two children, twin daughters Natasha and Ariel, whom Hessler featured in a June 2023 New Yorker article.
