= List of Kunlun Fight events =

This is a list of events held and scheduled by Kunlun Fight (KLF), a kickboxing and mixed martial arts promotion based in China. The first Kunlun Fight event, Kunlun Fight 1, took place in Pattaya, Thailand on January 25, 2014. Each Kunlun Fight event contains several fights. Events often have both tournament fights and superfights (single fights).

== Overview ==
Kunlun Fight events are separated into several different formats.

Current:

- "Kunlun Fight" highest level events, broadcast on television and iPPV.
- "Kunlun Combat Professional League" 2nd tier events. Teams from 16 Chinese cities fight in a league format, broadcast on television and streamed online.
- "City Hero" 3rd tier events with a mix of professional and amateur fights, streamed online and occasionally broadcast on local television.

Former:

- "Kunlun Fight MMA" mixed martial arts events, broadcast on iPPV and television.
- "Road to Kunlun" 2nd tier events, broadcast on iPPV and occasionally local television.
- "University Brawn" events for students, streamed online

== Kunlun Fight Events ==
#	Date	Event	Venue	Location
134	July 26, 2026	Kunlun Fight Elite Fight Night	Kunlun Fight Stadium	Tongling, China
133	July 25, 2026	Kunlun Fight 107	Kunlun Fight Stadium	Tongling, China
132	May 3, 2026	Kunlun Fight		Hotan, China
131	April 4, 2026	Kunlun Fight Elite Fight Night		Wenzhou, China
130	February 22, 2026	Kunlun Fight 106		Beijing, China
130	February 21, 2026	Kunlun Fight 105		Beijing, China
129	November 29, 2025	Kunlun Fight Elite Fight Night	Zaozhuang Sport and Culture Center Gymnasium	Zaozhuang, China
128	July 26, 2025	Kunlun Fight Elite Fight Night	Asilixisi Jiucaiping Sports Center	Bijie, China
127	July 5, 2025	Kunlun Fight 104	Kunlun Fight Stadium	Tongling, China
126	April 14, 2025	Kunlun Fight 103	China Film Studio	Beijing, China
125	December 16, 2024	Kunlun Fight & Cicada FC	Diamond Island Convention and Exhibition Center	Phnom Penh, Cambodia
124	November 16, 2024	IBA Kunlun Fight World Cup	National Indoor Stadium	Beijing, China
123	September 28, 2024	Kunlun Fight 102	Mangrove Tree International Conference Center	Sanya, Hainan, China
122	July 27, 2024	Kunlun Fight 101		Daming, Handan, Hebei, China
121	June 29, 2024	Kunlun Fight 100	Kunlun Fight Stadium	Tongling, Anhui, China
120	June 1, 2024	Kunlun Fight 99	Kunlun Fight Stadium	Tongling, Anhui, China
119	April 27, 2024	Kunlun Fight 98	Kunlun Headquarters	Beijing, China
118	April 27, 2024	Kunlun Fight 97		Beijing, China
117	March 23, 2024	Kunlun Fight 96	Kunlun Fight Stadium	Tongling, Anhui, China
116	January 20, 2024	Kunlun Fight 95	Spaceplus	Bangkok, Thailand
115	January 19, 2024	Kunlun Fight 94	Spaceplus	Bangkok, Thailand
114	November 25, 2023	Kunlun Fight 93	Kunlun Fight Stadium	Tongling, Anhui, China
113	October 21, 2023	Kunlun Fight 92		Beijing, China
112	September 16, 2023	Kunlun Fight 91		Beijing, China
111	August 12, 2023	Kunlun Fight 90	Kunlun Fight Stadium	Tongling, Anhui, China
110	July 8, 2023	Kunlun Fight 89	Kunlun Fight Stadium	Tongling, Anhui, China
109	June 25, 2022	Kunlun Fight & Cicada Fight Event	Madinat Arena	(United Arab Emirates) Dubai, UAE
108	December 25, 2019	Kunlun Fight 88	Yiwu International Expo Center	Yiwu, China
107	October 4, 2019	Kunlun Fight 87		Tongliao, Inner Mongolia, China
106	October 3, 2019	Kunlun Fight 86		Tongliao, Inner Mongolia, China
105	October 2, 2019	Kunlun Fight 85		Tongliao, Inner Mongolia, China
104	September 15, 2019	Kunlun Fight 84	Chishui Stadium	Zunyi, China
103	September 14, 2019	Kunlun Fight 83	Chishui Stadium	Zunyi, China
102	September 13, 2019	Kunlun Fight 82	Chishui Stadium	Zunyi, China
101	July 27, 2019	Kunlun Fight 81	Kunlun Fight World Combat Sports Center	Beijing, China
100	February 26, 2019	Kunlun Fight 80	Shanghai Chongming Stadium	Shanghai, China
99	December 15, 2018	Kunlun Fight 79		Taiyuan, China
98	November 19, 2018	Kunlun Fight Elite Fight Night 3	Kunlun Fight Stadium	Tongling, Anhui, China
97	November 6, 2018	Kunlun Fight Elite Fight Night 2	Kunlun Fight Stadium	Tongling, Anhui, China
96	November 5, 2018	Kunlun Fight Elite Fight Night 1	Kunlun Fight Stadium	Tongling, Anhui, China
95	October 22, 2018	Kunlun Fight 78	Kunlun Fight Stadium	Tongling, Anhui, China
94	October 14, 2018	Kunlun Fight 77	Kunlun Fight Stadium	Tongling, Anhui, China
93	September 9, 2018	Kunlun Fight 76	Shandong University of Finance & Economics Stadium	Zhangqiu, China
92	August 5, 2018	Kunlun Fight 75	Mangrove Tree International Conference Center	Sanya, Hainan, China
91	June 1, 2018	Kunlun Fight Macao	Macao Arena	Macau, SAR, China
90	May 26, 2018	Kunlun Fight World Tour: Russia	Platinum Arena	Khabarovsk, Russia
89	May 13, 2018	Kunlun Fight 74	Jinan Zhangqiu Stadium	Zhangqiu, China
88	May 6, 2018	Kunlun Fight 73	Mangrove Tree International Conference Center	Sanya, Hainan, China
87	April 15, 2018	Kunlun Fight 72	Kunlun Fight World Combat Sports Center	Beijing, China
86	April 1, 2018	Kunlun Fight 71	Mangrove Tree Resort	Qingdao, China
85	March 11, 2018	Kunlun Fight 70	Mangrove Tree International Conference Center	Sanya, Hainan, China
84	February 4, 2018	Kunlun Fight 69	Guanshan Lake International Conference Center	Guiyang, China
83	December 17, 2017	Kunlun Fight 68	Honghuagang Sport Center	Zunyi, China
82	November 12, 2017	Kunlun Fight 67	Mangrove Tree International Conference Center	Sanya, Hainan, China
81	November 5, 2017	Kunlun Fight 66	Optics Valley International Tennis Center	Wuhan, China
80	October 28, 2017	Kunlun Fight MMA 16	Melbourne Pavilion	Melbourne, Australia
79	October 3, 2017	Kunlun Fight MMA 15	Alxa Dream Park	Alxa, China
78	August 28, 2017	Kunlun Fight MMA 14	Mangrove Resort German Village Square	Qingdao, China
77	August 27, 2017	Kunlun Fight 65	Mangrove Resort German Village Square	Qingdao, China
76	July 15, 2017	Kunlun Fight 64	Jiangnan Stadium	Chongqing, China
75	July 6, 2017	Kunlun Fight MMA 13	Mangrove Tree Resort	Qingdao, China
74	June 24, 2017	Kunlun Fight 63	Mangrove Tree International Conference Center	Sanya, Hainan, China
73	June 10, 2017	Kunlun Fight 62	Workpoint Studios	Bangkok, Thailand
72	June 1, 2017	Kunlun Fight MMA 12	Lake Park	Dolon Nor, China
71	May 14, 2017	Kunlun Fight 61	Mangrove Tree International Conference Center	Sanya, Hainan, China
70	May 4, 2017	Kunlun Fight MMA 11	Jining High-Tech Zone Stadium	Shandong, China
69	April 23, 2017	Kunlun Fight 60	Honghuagang Sports Center	Guizhou, China
68	April 10, 2017	Kunlun Fight MMA 10	Kunlun Fight World Combat Sports Center	Beijing, China
67	March 25, 2017	Kunlun Fight 59	Mangrove Tree International Conference Center	Sanya, Hainan, China
66	March 11, 2017	Kunlun Fight 58 / Magnum Fc 1	Atlantico Live	Rome, Italy
65	February 26, 2017	Kunlun Fight 57	Mangrove Tree International Conference Center	Sanya, Hainan, China
64	February 25, 2017	Kunlun Fight MMA 9	Mangrove Tree International Conference Center	Sanya, Hainan, China
63	January 2, 2017	Kunlun Fight MMA 8	Mangrove Tree International Conference Center	Sanya, Hainan, China
62	January 1, 2017	Kunlun Fight 56	Mangrove Tree International Conference Center	Sanya, Hainan, China
61	December 15, 2016	Kunlun Fight MMA 7	Kunlun World Combat Sports Center	Beijing, China
60	December 10, 2016	Kunlun Fight 55	Guoxin Gymnasium	Qingdao, Shandong, China
59	October 30, 2016	Kunlun Fight 54	Optics Valley International Tennis Center	Wuhan, China
58	October 21, 2016	Kunlun Fight - Cage Fight Series 6	Yiwu Meihu Sports Centre	Yiwu, China
57	September 24, 2016	Kunlun Fight 53	Kunlun World Combat Sports Center	Beijing, China
56	September 11, 2016	Kunlun Fight 52	Strait Olympic Sports Center	Fuzhou, China
55	September 10, 2016	Kunlun Fight 51	Strait Olympic Sports Center	Fuzhou, China
54	August 20, 2016	Kunlun Fight 50	Jinan Olympic Sports Center Gymnasium	Jinan, China
53	August 7, 2016	Kunlun Fight 49 / Rebels 45	Ota-City General Gymnasium	Tokyo, Japan
52	July 31, 2016	Kunlun Fight 48	Jining Olympic Sports Center Gymnasium	Jining, China
51	July 10, 2016	Kunlun Fight 47	Wutaishan Sports Center	Nanjing, China
50	June 26, 2016	Kunlun Fight 46	Kunming International Convention and Exhibition Centre Hall 7	Kunming, China
49	June 5, 2016	Kunlun Fight 45	Sichuan Gymnasium	Chengdu, China
48	May 22, 2016	Kunlun Fight - Cage Fight Series 5 / Top FC 11	Olympic Park, Seoul	(South Korea) Seoul, Korea
47	May 14, 2016	Kunlun Fight 44 / MFP: Mayor's Cup 2016	Platinum Arena	Khabarovsk, Russia
46	April 23, 2016	Kunlun Fight 43	Zhoukou Gymnasium	Zhoukou, China
45	April 9, 2016	Kunlun Fight 42	Haihu District Gym Center	Xining, China
44	April 8, 2016	Kunlun Fight 41	Haihu District Gym Center	Xining, China
43	March 25, 2016	Kunlun Fight 40	Tongling Zodiac Park	Tongling, China
42	March 20, 2016	Kunlun Fight 39	Dongguan Stadium	Dongguan, China
41	February 21, 2016	Kunlun Fight 38 / Super Muaythai 2016	Pattaya Indoor Stadium	Pattaya, Thailand
40	January 23, 2016	Kunlun Fight 37	Crown of Beauty Theatre	Sanya, China
39	January 9, 2016	Kunlun Fight 36	Shanghai Oriental Sports Center	Shanghai, China
38	December 19, 2015	Kunlun Fight 35	Luoyang Stadium	Luoyang, China
37	November 21, 2015	Kunlun Fight 34	Shenzhen Bay Gymnasium	Shenzhen, China
36	October 31, 2015	Kunlun Fight 33	Changde College Sport Hall	Changde, China
35	October 28, 2015	Kunlun Fight 32	Daxian Stadium	Dazhou, China
34	October 4, 2015	Kunlun Fight - Cage Fight Series 4	Saryarka Velodrome	Astana, Kazakhstan
33	September 28, 2015	Kunlun Fight 31	Asiatique	Bangkok, Thailand
32	September 4, 2015	Kunlun Fight 30 / Topking World Series: TK5	Zhoukou Sports Center	Zhoukou, China
31	August 15, 2015	Kunlun Fight 29	Ice Cube Curling Center	Sochi, Russia
30	July 19, 2015	Kunlun Fight 28	Wutaishan Sports Center	Nanjing, China
29	July 18, 2015	Kunlun Fight 27	Wutaishan Sports Center	Nanjing, China
28	June 7, 2015	Kunlun Fight 26	Jiangnan Sports Hall	Chongqing, China
27	June 6, 2015	Kunlun Fight - Cage Fight Series 3	Jiangnan Sports Hall	Chongqing, China
26	May 15, 2015	Kunlun Fight 25	Štiavničkách Sports Hall	(Slovenia) Banská Bystrica, Slovakia
25	May 2, 2015	Kunlun Fight 24	Palaferroli San Bonifacio	Verona, Italy
24	April 26, 2015	Kunlun Fight 23	International Economics College Gymnasium	Changsha, China
23	April 12, 2015	Kunlun Fight 22	Changde College Sport Hall	Changde, China
22	April 4, 2015	Kunlun Fight - Cage Fight Series 2	Baluan Sholak Sports Palace	Almaty, Kazakhstan
21	March 17, 2015	Kunlun Fight 21	Serenity Sanya Marina	Sanya, China
20	March 8, 2015	Kunlun Fight 20	Starlight Park	Beijing, China
19	February 1, 2015	Kunlun Fight 19	Tianhe Stadium	Guangzhou, China
18	January 18, 2015	Kunlun Fight 18	Wutaishan Sports Center	Nanjing, China
17	January 17, 2015	Kunlun Fight 17	Wutaishan Sports Center	Nanjing, China
16	January 4, 2015	Kunlun Fight 16	Nanjing Olympic Sports Center Gymnasium	Nanjing, China
15	January 3, 2015	Kunlun Fight 15	Nanjing Olympic Sports Center Gymnasium	Nanjing, China
14	December 4, 2014	Kunlun Fight 14	Royal Bangkok Sports Club	Bangkok, Thailand
13	November 16, 2014	Kunlun Fight 13	Hohhot People's Stadium	Hohhot, China
12	October 26, 2014	Kunlun Fight 12	Jianshui Olympic Sports Center	Jianshui, China
11	October 5, 2014	Kunlun Fight 11	Macau Forum	Macau, China
10	September 13, 2014	Kunlun Fight 10 / Topking World Series: TK1	Belarusian State Circus	Minsk, Belarus
9	August 31, 2014	Kunlun Fight 9	Shangqiu Stadium	Shangqiu, China
8	August 24, 2014	Kunlun Fight 8	Xining Badminton Center	Xining, China
7	July 27, 2014	Kunlun Fight 7	Zhoukou Sports Center	Zhoukou, China
6	June 29, 2014	Kunlun Fight 6	Chongqing Jiangnan Sports Hall	Chongqing, China
5	June 1, 2014	Kunlun Fight 5	Sichuan Emei Buddha Temple	Leshan, China
4	April 27, 2014	Kunlun Fight 4	Solaire Resort & Casino	Manila, Philippines
3	March 30, 2014	Kunlun Fight 3	Heilongjiang University Stadium	Harbin, China
2	February 16, 2014	Kunlun Fight 2 / Wu Lin Feng 2014 / MAX Muaythai 6	Henan Province Stadium	Zhengzhou, China
1	January 25, 2014	Kunlun Fight 1	Pattaya Beach Square	Pattaya, Thailand

== Kunlun Combat Professional League events ==
#	Date	Event	Venue	Location
148	December 24, 2019	Kunlun Combat Professional League - Shenzhen vs. Shenyang - 2019 League Final	Yiwu International Expo Center	Yiwu, China
147	December 1, 2019	Kunlun Combat Professional League - Shenzhen vs. Zunyi - League Playoff Semifinal	Kunlun Fight Stadium	Tongling, Anhui, China
146	December 1, 2019	Kunlun Combat Professional League - Shenyang vs. Kunshan - League Playoff Semifinal	Kunlun Fight Stadium	Tongling, Anhui, China
145	November 17, 2019	Kunlun Combat Professional League - Zunyi vs. Changsha - League Playoff Quarterfinal	Kunlun Fight Stadium	Tongling, Anhui, China
144	November 17, 2019	Kunlun Combat Professional League - Shenzhen vs. Shanghai - League Playoff Quarterfinal	Kunlun Fight Stadium	Tongling, Anhui, China
143	November 16, 2019	Kunlun Combat Professional League - Kunshan vs. Zhengzhou - League Playoff Quarterfinal	Kunlun Fight Stadium	Tongling, Anhui, China
142	November 16, 2019	Kunlun Combat Professional League - Shenyang vs. Chengdu - League Playoff Quarterfinal	Kunlun Fight Stadium	Tongling, Anhui, China
141	November 3, 2019	Kunlun Combat Professional League - Shanghai vs. Sanmenxia	Kunlun Fight Stadium	Tongling, Anhui, China
140	November 3, 2019	Kunlun Combat Professional League - Changsha vs. Qingdao	Kunlun Fight Stadium	Tongling, Anhui, China
139	November 2, 2019	Kunlun Combat Professional League - Zunyi vs. Jinan	Kunlun Fight Stadium	Tongling, Anhui, China
138	November 2, 2019	Kunlun Combat Professional League - Shenzhen vs. Yinchuan	Kunlun Fight Stadium	Tongling, Anhui, China
137	November 1, 2019	Kunlun Combat Professional League - Beijing vs. Chengdu	Kunlun Fight Stadium	Tongling, Anhui, China
136	November 1, 2019	Kunlun Combat Professional League - Zhengzhou vs. Wenzhou	Kunlun Fight Stadium	Tongling, Anhui, China
135	October 31, 2019	Kunlun Combat Professional League - Kunshan vs. Guangzhou	Kunlun Fight Stadium	Tongling, Anhui, China
134	October 31, 2019	Kunlun Combat Professional League - Shenyang vs. Wuhan	Kunlun Fight Stadium	Tongling, Anhui, China
133	October 20, 2019	Kunlun Combat Professional League - Shanghai vs. Chengdu	Kunlun Fight Stadium	Tongling, Anhui, China
132	October 20, 2019	Kunlun Combat Professional League - Wenzhou vs. Changsha	Kunlun Fight Stadium	Tongling, Anhui, China
131	October 19, 2019	Kunlun Combat Professional League - Beijing vs. Sanmenxia	Kunlun Fight Stadium	Tongling, Anhui, China
130	October 19, 2019	Kunlun Combat Professional League - Qingdao vs. Zhengzhou	Kunlun Fight Stadium	Tongling, Anhui, China
129	October 18, 2019	Kunlun Combat Professional League - Zunyi vs. Guangzhou	Kunlun Fight Stadium	Tongling, Anhui, China
128	October 18, 2019	Kunlun Combat Professional League - Shenzhen vs. Wuhan	Kunlun Fight Stadium	Tongling, Anhui, China
127	October 17, 2019	Kunlun Combat Professional League - Jinan vs. Kunshan	Kunlun Fight Stadium	Tongling, Anhui, China
126	October 17, 2019	Kunlun Combat Professional League - Shenyang vs. Yinchuan	Kunlun Fight Stadium	Tongling, Anhui, China
125	August 18, 2019	Kunlun Combat Professional League - Zhengzhou vs. Qingdao - Northern Group Round 7		Tongliao, Inner Mongolia, China
Zhengzhou vs. Qingdao fights took place on Kunlun Fight 85.
125	August 18, 2019	Kunlun Combat Professional League - Chengdu vs. Wuhan	Kunlun Fight Stadium	Tongling, Anhui, China
124	August 17, 2019	Kunlun Combat Professional League - Wenzhou vs. Zunyi	Kunlun Fight Stadium	Tongling, Anhui, China
123	July 14, 2019	Kunlun Combat Professional League - Chengdu vs. Shenzhen - Southern Group Round 7	Kunlun Fight Stadium	Tongling, Anhui, China
122	July 13, 2019	Kunlun Combat Professional League - Changsha vs. Zunyi - Southern Group Round 7	Kunlun Fight Stadium	Tongling, Anhui, China
121	July 12, 2019	Kunlun Combat Professional League - Wuhan vs. Wenzhou - Southern Group Round 7	Kunlun Fight Stadium	Tongling, Anhui, China
120	July 11, 2019	Kunlun Combat Professional League - Shanghai vs. Guangzhou - Southern Group Round 7	Kunlun Fight Stadium	Tongling, Anhui, China
119	July 7, 2019	Kunlun Combat Professional League - Kunshan vs. Shenyang - Northern Group Round 6	Kunlun Fight Stadium	Tongling, Anhui, China
118	July 6, 2019	Kunlun Combat Professional League - Beijing vs. Qingdao - Northern Group Round 6	Kunlun Fight Stadium	Tongling, Anhui, China
117	July 6, 2019	Kunlun Combat Professional League - Jinan vs. Yinchuan - Northern Group Round 6	Kunlun Fight Stadium	Tongling, Anhui, China
116	July 5, 2019	Kunlun Combat Professional League - Sanmenxia vs. Zhengzhou - Northern Group Round 6	Kunlun Fight Stadium	Tongling, Anhui, China
115	June 30, 2019	Kunlun Combat Professional League - Chengdu vs. Shanghai - Southern Group Round 6	Kunlun Fight Stadium	Tongling, Anhui, China
114	June 29, 2019	Kunlun Combat Professional League - Shenzhen vs. Wuhan - Southern Group Round 6	Kunlun Fight Stadium	Tongling, Anhui, China
113	June 28, 2019	Kunlun Combat Professional League - Zunyi vs. Guangzhou - Southern Group Round 6	Kunlun Fight Stadium	Tongling, Anhui, China
112	June 27, 2019	Kunlun Combat Professional League - Wenzhou vs. Changsha - Southern Group Round 6	Kunlun Fight Stadium	Tongling, Anhui, China
111	June 23, 2019	Kunlun Combat Professional League - Shenyang vs. Kunshan - Northern Group Round 5	Kunlun Fight Stadium	Tongling, Anhui, China
110	June 22, 2019	Kunlun Combat Professional League - Zhengzhou vs. Sanmenxia - Northern Group Round 5	Kunlun Fight Stadium	Tongling, Anhui, China
109	June 21, 2019	Kunlun Combat Professional League - Qingdao vs. Beijing - Northern Group Round 5	Kunlun Fight Stadium	Tongling, Anhui, China
108	June 20, 2019	Kunlun Combat Professional League - Yinchuan vs. Jinan - Northern Group Round 5	Kunlun Fight Stadium	Tongling, Anhui, China
107	June 16, 2019	Kunlun Combat Professional League - Guangzhou vs. Changsha - Southern Group Round 5	Kunlun Fight Stadium	Tongling, Anhui, China
106	June 15, 2019	Kunlun Combat Professional League - Wuhan vs. Zunyi - Southern Group Round 5	Kunlun Fight Stadium	Tongling, Anhui, China
105	June 15, 2019	Kunlun Combat Professional League - Shanghai vs. Shenzhen - Southern Group Round 5	Kunlun Fight Stadium	Tongling, Anhui, China
104	June 14, 2019	Kunlun Combat Professional League - Chengdu vs. Wenzhou - Southern Group Round 5	Kunlun Fight Stadium	Tongling, Anhui, China
103	June 9, 2019	Kunlun Combat Professional League - Sanmenxia vs. Kunshan - Northern Group Round 4	Kunlun Fight Stadium	Tongling, Anhui, China
102	June 8, 2019	Kunlun Combat Professional League - Qingdao vs. Jinan - Northern Group Round 4	Kunlun Fight Stadium	Tongling, Anhui, China
101	June 7, 2019	Kunlun Combat Professional League - Yinchuan vs. Zhengzhou - Northern Group Round 4	Kunlun Fight Stadium	Tongling, Anhui, China
100	June 6, 2019	Kunlun Combat Professional League - Beijing vs. Shenyang - Northern Group Round 4	Kunlun Fight Stadium	Tongling, Anhui, China
99	June 2, 2019	Kunlun Combat Professional League - Wuhan vs. Chengdu - Southern Group Round 4	Kunlun Fight Stadium	Tongling, Anhui, China
98	June 1, 2019	Kunlun Combat Professional League - Changsha vs. Shenzhen - Southern Group Round 4	Kunlun Fight Stadium	Tongling, Anhui, China
97	May 31, 2019	Kunlun Combat Professional League - Wenzhou vs. Guangzhou - Southern Group Round 4	Kunlun Fight Stadium	Tongling, Anhui, China
96	May 30, 2019	Kunlun Combat Professional League - Zunyi vs. Shanghai - Southern Group Round 4	Kunlun Fight Stadium	Tongling, Anhui, China
95	May 19, 2019	Kunlun Combat Professional League - Jinan vs. Qingdao - Northern Group Round 3	Kunlun Fight Stadium	Tongling, Anhui, China
94	May 19, 2019	Kunlun Combat Professional League - Kunshan vs. Sanmenxia - Northern Group Round 3	Kunlun Fight Stadium	Tongling, Anhui, China
93	May 19, 2019	Kunlun Combat Professional League - Shenyang vs. Beijing - Northern Group Round 3	Kunlun Fight Stadium	Tongling, Anhui, China
92	May 18, 2019	Kunlun Combat Professional League - Zhengzhou vs. Yinchuan - Northern Group Round 3	Kunlun Fight Stadium	Tongling, Anhui, China
91	May 18, 2019	Kunlun Combat Professional League - Chengdu vs. Guangzhou - Southern Group Round 3	Kunlun Fight Stadium	Tongling, Anhui, China
90	May 17, 2019	Kunlun Combat Professional League - Shenzhen vs. Zunyi - Southern Group Round 3	Kunlun Fight Stadium	Tongling, Anhui, China
89	May 17, 2019	Kunlun Combat Professional League - Wuhan vs. Changsha - Southern Group Round 3	Kunlun Fight Stadium	Tongling, Anhui, China
88	May 12, 2019	Kunlun Combat Professional League - Wenzhou vs. Shanghai - Southern Group Round 3	Kunlun Fight Stadium	Tongling, Anhui, China
87	April 21, 2019	Kunlun Combat Professional League - Sanmenxia vs. Qingdao - Northern Group Round 2	Kunlun Fight Stadium	Tongling, Anhui, China
86	April 21, 2019	Kunlun Combat Professional League - Zhengzhou vs. Jinan - Northern Group Round 2	Kunlun Fight Stadium	Tongling, Anhui, China
85	April 20, 2019	Kunlun Combat Professional League - Shenyang vs. Yinchuan - Northern Group Round 2	Kunlun Fight Stadium	Tongling, Anhui, China
84	April 20, 2019	Kunlun Combat Professional League - Beijing vs. Kunshan - Northern Group Round 2	Kunlun Fight Stadium	Tongling, Anhui, China
83	April 13, 2019	Kunlun Combat Professional League - Guangzhou vs. Wuhan - Southern Group Round 2	Kunlun Fight Stadium	Tongling, Anhui, China
82	April 12, 2019	Kunlun Combat Professional League - Chengdu vs. Guizhou - Southern Group Round 2	Kunlun Fight Stadium	Tongling, Anhui, China
81	April 12, 2019	Kunlun Combat Professional League - Changsha vs. Shanghai - Southern Group Round 2	Kunlun Fight Stadium	Tongling, Anhui, China
80	April 11, 2019	Kunlun Combat Professional League - Wenzhou vs. Shenzhen - Southern Group Round 2	Kunlun Fight Stadium	Tongling, Anhui, China
79	April 11, 2019	Kunlun Combat Professional League - Beijing vs. Sanmenxia - Northern Group Round 1	Kunlun Fight Stadium	Tongling, Anhui, China
78	April 10, 2019	Kunlun Combat Professional League - Yinchuan vs. Kunshan - Northern Group Round 1	Kunlun Fight Stadium	Tongling, Anhui, China
77	April 10, 2019	Kunlun Combat Professional League - Qingdao vs. Shenyang - Northern Group Round 1	Kunlun Fight Stadium	Tongling, Anhui, China
76	April 9, 2019	Kunlun Combat Professional League - Jinan vs. Zhengzhou - Northern Group Round 1	Kunlun Fight Stadium	Tongling, Anhui, China
75	April 9, 2019	Kunlun Combat Professional League - Changsha vs. Wuhan - Southern Group Round 1	Kunlun Fight Stadium	Tongling, Anhui, China
74	March 24, 2019	Kunlun Combat Professional League - Shenzhen vs. Longyan - Southern Group Round 1	Kunlun Fight Stadium	Tongling, Anhui, China
73	March 23, 2019	Kunlun Combat Professional League - Zunyi vs. Wenzhou - Southern Group Round 1	Kunlun Fight Stadium	Tongling, Anhui, China
72	March 16, 2019	Kunlun Combat Professional League - Shanghai vs. Wuhan - Southern Group Round 1	Kunlun Fight Stadium	Tongling, Anhui, China
71	December 31, 2018	Kunlun Combat League - Changzhou vs. Kunshan	Kunlun Fight Stadium	Tongling, Anhui, China
70	December 29, 2018	Kunlun Combat League - Hefei vs. Wuhan	Kunlun Fight Stadium	Tongling, Anhui, China
69	December 28, 2018	Kunlun Combat League - Longyan vs. Qingdao	Kunlun Fight Stadium	Tongling, Anhui, China
68	December 27, 2018	Kunlun Combat League - Wenzhou vs. Dongguan	Kunlun Fight Stadium	Tongling, Anhui, China
67	December 26, 2018	Kunlun Combat League - Changsha vs. Guiyang	Kunlun Fight Stadium	Tongling, Anhui, China
66	December 23, 2018	Kunlun Combat League - Xuzhou vs. Yichang	Kunlun Fight Stadium	Tongling, Anhui, China
65	December 22, 2018	Kunlun Combat League - Beijing vs.Beijing	Kunlun Fight Stadium	Tongling, Anhui, China
64	December 21, 2018	Kunlun Combat League - Huizhou vs. Sanmenxia	Kunlun Fight Stadium	Tongling, Anhui, China
63	December 20, 2018	Kunlun Combat League - Shanghai vs. Chengdu	Kunlun Fight Stadium	Tongling, Anhui, China
62	December 19, 2018	Kunlun Combat League - Dalian vs. Tianjin	Kunlun Fight Stadium	Tongling, Anhui, China
61	December 8, 2018	Kunlun Combat League - Qingdao vs. Jinan	Kunlun Fight Stadium	Tongling, Anhui, China
60	December 7, 2018	Kunlun Combat League - Wuhan vs. Guangzhou	Kunlun Fight Stadium	Tongling, Anhui, China
59	December 6, 2018	Kunlun Combat League - Kunshan vs. Zhengzhou	Kunlun Fight Stadium	Tongling, Anhui, China
58	December 5, 2018	Kunlun Combat League - Guiyang vs. Dongguan	Kunlun Fight Stadium	Tongling, Anhui, China
57	December 2, 2018	Kunlun Combat League - Chengdu vs. Shenzhen	Kunlun Fight Stadium	Tongling, Anhui, China
56	December 1, 2018	Kunlun Combat League - Xuancheng vs. Tianjin	Kunlun Fight Stadium	Tongling, Anhui, China
55	November 30, 2018	Kunlun Combat League - Beijing vs. Yichang	Kunlun Fight Stadium	Tongling, Anhui, China
54	November 29, 2018	Kunlun Combat League - Sanmenxia vs. Taiyuan	Kunlun Fight Stadium	Tongling, Anhui, China
53	November 28, 2018	Kunlun Combat League - Wuhan vs. Qingdao	Kunlun Fight Stadium	Tongling, Anhui, China
52	November 25, 2018	Kunlun Combat League - Guangzhou vs. Jinan	Kunlun Fight Stadium	Tongling, Anhui, China
51	November 24, 2018	Kunlun Combat League - Kunshan vs. Dongguan	Kunlun Fight Stadium	Tongling, Anhui, China
50	November 23, 2018	Kunlun Combat League - Guiyang vs. Zhengzhou	Kunlun Fight Stadium	Tongling, Anhui, China
49	November 22, 2018	Kunlun Combat League - Chengdu vs. Tianjin	Kunlun Fight Stadium	Tongling, Anhui, China
48	November 21, 2018	Kunlun Combat League - Xuancheng vs. Shenzhen	Kunlun Fight Stadium	Tongling, Anhui, China
47	November 18, 2018	Kunlun Combat League - Beijing vs. Taiyuan	Kunlun Fight Stadium	Tongling, Anhui, China
46	November 17, 2018	Kunlun Combat League - Sanmenxia vs. Yichang	Kunlun Fight Stadium	Tongling, Anhui, China
45	November 16, 2018	Kunlun Combat League - Qingdao vs. Zhengzhou	Kunlun Fight Stadium	Tongling, Anhui, China
44	November 15, 2018	Kunlun Combat League - Guangzhou vs. Dongguan	Kunlun Fight Stadium	Tongling, Anhui, China
43	November 14, 2018	Kunlun Combat League - Kunshan vs. Jinan	Kunlun Fight Stadium	Tongling, Anhui, China
42	November 11, 2018	Kunlun Combat League - Wuhan vs. Guiyang	Kunlun Fight Stadium	Tongling, Anhui, China
41	November 10, 2018	Kunlun Combat League - Chengdu vs. Yichang	Kunlun Fight Stadium	Tongling, Anhui, China
40	November 9, 2018	Kunlun Combat League - Xuancheng vs. Taiyuan	Kunlun Fight Stadium	Tongling, Anhui, China
39	November 8, 2018	Kunlun Combat League - Beijing vs. Shenzhen	Kunlun Fight Stadium	Tongling, Anhui, China
38	November 7, 2018	Kunlun Combat League - Sanmenxia vs. Tianjin	Kunlun Fight Stadium	Tongling, Anhui, China
37	November 4, 2018	Kunlun Combat League - Qingdao vs. Dongguan	Kunlun Fight Stadium	Tongling, Anhui, China
36	November 3, 2018	Kunlun Combat League - Guangzhou vs. Zhengzhou	Kunlun Fight Stadium	Tongling, Anhui, China
35	November 2, 2018	Kunlun Combat League - Wuhan vs. Kunshan	Kunlun Fight Stadium	Tongling, Anhui, China
34	November 1, 2018	Kunlun Combat League - Guiyang vs. Jinan	Kunlun Fight Stadium	Tongling, Anhui, China
33	October 31, 2018	Kunlun Combat League - Chengdu vs. Taiyuan	Kunlun Fight Stadium	Tongling, Anhui, China
32	October 30, 2018	Kunlun Combat League	Kunlun Fight Stadium	Tongling, Anhui, China
31	October 29, 2018	Kunlun Combat League - Guangzhou vs. Kunshan	Kunlun Fight Stadium	Tongling, Anhui, China
30	October 28, 2018	Kunlun Combat League - Yichang vs. Xuancheng	Kunlun Fight Stadium	Tongling, Anhui, China
29	October 27, 2018	Kunlun Combat League - Beijing vs. Tianjin	Kunlun Fight Stadium	Tongling, Anhui, China
28	October 26, 2018	Kunlun Combat League - Sanmenxia vs. Shenzhen	Kunlun Fight Stadium	Tongling, Anhui, China
27	October 25, 2018	Kunlun Combat League - Zhengzhou vs. Wuhan	Kunlun Fight Stadium	Tongling, Anhui, China
26	October 24, 2018	Kunlun Combat League - Jinan vs. Dongguan	Kunlun Fight Stadium	Tongling, Anhui, China
25	October 20, 2018	Kunlun Combat League - Guiyang vs. Qingdao	Kunlun Fight Stadium	Tongling, Anhui, China
24	October 19, 2018	Kunlun Combat League - Tianjin vs. Yichang	Kunlun Fight Stadium	Tongling, Anhui, China
23	October 19, 2018	Kunlun Combat League		China
22	October 18, 2018	Kunlun Combat League - Shenzhen vs. Taiyuan	Kunlun Fight Stadium	Tongling, Anhui, China
21	October 17, 2018	Kunlun Combat League - Xuancheng vs. Beijing	Kunlun Fight Stadium	Tongling, Anhui, China
20	October 16, 2018	Kunlun Combat League - Sanmenxiavs. Chengdu	Kunlun Fight Stadium	Tongling, Anhui, China
19	October 15, 2018	Kunlun Combat League - Wuhan vs. Dongguan	Kunlun Fight Stadium	Tongling, Anhui, China
18	October 12, 2018	Kunlun Combat League - Jinan vs. Zhengzhou	Kunlun Fight Stadium	Tongling, Anhui, China
17	October 11, 2018	Kunlun Combat League - Kunshan vs. Qingdao	Kunlun Fight Stadium	Tongling, Anhui, China
16	October 10, 2018	Kunlun Combat League - Guiyang vs. Guangzhou	Kunlun Fight Stadium	Tongling, Anhui, China
15	October 9, 2018	Kunlun Combat League	Kunlun Fight Stadium	Tongling, Anhui, China
14	October 7, 2018	Kunlun Combat League - Tianjin vs. Taiyuan	Kunlun Fight Stadium	Tongling, Anhui, China
13	October 6, 2018	Kunlun Combat League - Shenzhen vs. Yichang	Kunlun Fight Stadium	Tongling, Anhui, China
12	October 5, 2018	Kunlun Combat League - Chengdu vs. Beijing	Kunlun Fight Stadium	Tongling, Anhui, China
11	October 4, 2018	Kunlun Combat League - Sanmenxia vs. Xuancheng	Kunlun Fight Stadium	Tongling, Anhui, China
10	October 3, 2018	Kunlun Combat League - Zhengzhou vs. Dongguan	Kunlun Fight Stadium	Tongling, Anhui, China
9	October 2, 2018	Kunlun Combat League	Kunlun Fight Stadium	Tongling, Anhui, China
8	September 30, 2018	Kunlun Combat League - Jinan vs. Wuhan	Kunlun Fight Stadium	Tongling, Anhui, China
7	September 29, 2018	Kunlun Combat League - Guangzhou vs. Qingdao	Kunlun Fight Stadium	Tongling, Anhui, China
6	September 28, 2018	Kunlun Combat League - Guiyang vs. Kunshan	Kunlun Fight Stadium	Tongling, Anhui, China
5	September 27, 2018	Kunlun Combat League - Yichang vs. Taiyuan	Kunlun Fight Stadium	Tongling, Anhui, China
4	September 26, 2018	Kunlun Combat League - Shenzhen vs. Tianjin	Kunlun Fight Stadium	Tongling, Anhui, China
3	September 25, 2018	Kunlun Combat League	Kunlun Fight Stadium	Tongling, Anhui, China
2	September 23, 2018	Kunlun Combat League - Xuancheng vs. Chengdu	Kunlun Fight Stadium	Tongling, Anhui, China
1	September 22, 2018	Kunlun Combat League - Beijing vs. Sanmenxia	Kunlun Fight Stadium	Tongling, Anhui, China

== Kunlun Fight City Hero events ==
#	Date	Event	Venue	Location
	January 18, 2020	Kunlun Fight City Hero 244		Guangxi, China
	January 1, 2020	Kunlun Fight City Hero 243		Guangxi, China
	December 31, 2019	Kunlun Fight City Hero 242		Guangxi, China
	December 21, 2019	Kunlun Fight City Hero 241		Chongqing, China
	September 14, 2019	Kunlun Fight City Hero 240		Bishan, China
	September 14, 2019	Kunlun Fight City Hero 239		Bishan, China
	August 30, 2019	Kunlun Fight City Hero 238		Du'an, China
	August 30, 2019	Kunlun Fight City Hero 237		Du'an, China
	August 29, 2019	Kunlun Fight City Hero 236		Du'an, China
	August 24, 2019	Kunlun Fight City Hero 235		Beijing, China
	August 24, 2019	Kunlun Fight City Hero 234		Beijing, China
	August 24, 2019	Kunlun Fight City Hero 233		Bazhou, China
	August 24, 2019	Kunlun Fight City Hero 232		Bazhou, China
	August 17, 2019	Kunlun Fight City Hero 231		Dongguan, China
	August 11, 2019	Kunlun Fight City Hero 230		Shenzhen, China
	August 10, 2019	Kunlun Fight City Hero 229		Shenzhen, China
	August 4, 2019	Kunlun Fight City Hero 228		Shenzhen, China
	July 28, 2019	Kunlun Fight City Hero 227		Shenzhen, China
	July 21, 2019	Kunlun Fight City Hero 226		Shenzhen, China
	July 14, 2019	Kunlun Fight City Hero 225		Shenzhen, China
	July 13, 2019	Kunlun Fight City Hero 224		Shenzhen, China
	July 12, 2019	Kunlun Fight City Hero 223		Shenzhen, China
	June 22, 2019	Kunlun Fight City Hero 222		Chongqing, China
	June 16, 2019	Kunlun Fight City Hero 221		Guizhou, China
	May 26, 2019	Kunlun Fight City Hero 220		Chongqing, China
	May 25, 2019	Kunlun Fight City Hero 219		Chongqing, China
	May 26, 2019	Kunlun Fight City Hero 218		Beijing, China
	May 4, 2019	Kunlun Fight City Hero 217		Chongqing, China
	March 31, 2019	Kunlun Fight City Hero 216		Bishan, China
	January 26, 2019	Kunlun Fight City Hero 215		Xuwen, China
	January 12, 2019	Kunlun Fight City Hero 214		Yongchuan, China
	January 11, 2019-January 12, 2019	Kunlun Fight City Hero 213		Nanning, China
	January 1, 2019	Kunlun Fight City Hero 212		Ganzhou, China
	December 29, 2018	Kunlun Fight City Hero 211		Fuling, China
	December 25, 2018	Kunlun Fight City Hero 210		Chongqing, China
	December 23, 2018	Kunlun Fight City Hero 209		Wuhan, China
	December 22, 2018	Kunlun Fight City Hero 208		Chongqing, China
	December 1, 2018	Kunlun Fight City Hero 207		Xi'an, China
	November 11, 2018	Kunlun Fight City Hero 206		Beijing, China
	November 25, 2018	Kunlun Fight City Hero 205		Baisha, China
	November 24, 2018	Kunlun Fight City Hero 204		Wuhan, China
	November 24, 2018-November 25, 2018	Kunlun Fight City Hero 203		Hekou, China
	October 28, 2018	Kunlun Fight City Hero 202		Beijing, China
	October 27, 2018	Kunlun Fight City Hero 201		Qingdao, China
	October 13, 2018	Kunlun Fight City Hero 200		Meitan, China
	October 6, 2018	Kunlun Fight City Hero 199		Wuhan, China
	September 22, 2018	Kunlun Fight City Hero 198		Caoxian, China
	September 8, 2018	Kunlun Fight City Hero 197		Dongguan, China
	September 1, 2018	Kunlun Fight City Hero 196		Wuhan, China
	August 26, 2018	Kunlun Fight City Hero 195		Bishan, China
	August 25, 2018-August 26, 2018	Kunlun Fight City Hero 194		Du'an, China
	August 18, 2018	Kunlun Fight City Hero 193		Hekou, China
	August 18, 2018	Kunlun Fight City Hero 192		Shenzhen, China
	August 17, 2018	Kunlun Fight City Hero 191		Jieyang, China
	August 17, 2018	Kunlun Fight City Hero 190		Shenzhen, China
	August 17, 2018	Kunlun Fight City Hero 189		Dongguan, China
	August 5, 2018	Kunlun Fight City Hero 188		Shenzhen, China
	August 4, 2018	Kunlun Fight City Hero 187		Shenzhen, China
	August 3, 2018	Kunlun Fight City Hero 186		Shenzhen, China
	July 29, 2018	Kunlun Fight City Hero 185		Shenzhen, China
	July 28, 2018	Kunlun Fight City Hero 184		Shenzhen, China
	July 28, 2018	Kunlun Fight City Hero 183		Beijing, China
	July 27, 2018	Kunlun Fight City Hero 182		Cixi, China
	July 27, 2018	Kunlun Fight City Hero 181		Shenzhen, China
	July 22, 2018	Kunlun Fight City Hero 180		Shenzhen, China
	July 21, 2018	Kunlun Fight City Hero 179		Nanyang, China
	July 21, 2018	Kunlun Fight City Hero 178		Shenzhen, China
	July 21, 2018	Kunlun Fight City Hero 177		Wuhan, China
	July 20, 2018	Kunlun Fight City Hero 176		Shenzhen, China
	July 15, 2018	Kunlun Fight City Hero 175		Dahua, China
	July 8, 2018	Kunlun Fight City Hero 174		Qingdao, China
	June 30, 2018	Kunlun Fight City Hero 173		Hechi, China
	June 30, 2018	Kunlun Fight City Hero 172		Beijing, China
	June 23, 2018	Kunlun Fight City Hero 171		Yinan, China
	June 23, 2018	Kunlun Fight City Hero 170		Xuancheng, China
	June 18, 2018	Kunlun Fight City Hero 169		Wuhan, China
	June 2, 2018	Kunlun Fight City Hero 168		Du'an, China
	May 26, 2018	Kunlun Fight City Hero 167		Zhongxian, China
	May 19, 2018	Kunlun Fight City Hero 166		Jianyang, China
	May 18, 2018	Kunlun Fight City Hero 165		Zhangqiu, China
	May 12, 2018	Kunlun Fight City Hero 164		Huizhou, China
	May 5, 2018	Kunlun Fight City Hero 163		China
	May 1, 2018	Kunlun Fight City Hero 162		China
	April 22, 2018	Kunlun Fight City Hero 161		Xiangfen, China
	April 21, 2018	Kunlun Fight City Hero 160		Jingxiang, China
	April 7, 2018	Kunlun Fight City Hero 159		Qingdao, China
	April 7, 2018	Kunlun Fight City Hero 158		Chongqing, China
	March 25, 2018	Kunlun Fight City Hero 157		Wuhan, China
	March 17, 2018	Kunlun Fight City Hero 156		China
	February 9, 2018	Kunlun Fight City Hero 155		Du'an, China
	February 3, 2018	Kunlun Fight City Hero 154		Bama, China
	January 21, 2018	Kunlun Fight City Hero 153		Chongqing, China
	January 17, 2018	Kunlun Fight City Hero 152		Dongguan, China
	December 29, 2017	Kunlun Fight City Hero 151		China
	December 23, 2017	Kunlun Fight City Hero 150		China
	December 17, 2017	Kunlun Fight City Hero 149		China
	December 16, 2017	Kunlun Fight City Hero 148		China
	December 9, 2017	Kunlun Fight City Hero 147		China
	November 19, 2017	Kunlun Fight City Hero 146		China
	November 18, 2017	Kunlun Fight City Hero 145		Jingxiang, China
	November 5, 2017	Kunlun Fight City Hero 144		China
	November 4, 2017	Kunlun Fight City Hero 143		China
	November 3, 2017	Kunlun Fight City Hero 142		China
	October 28, 2017	Kunlun Fight City Hero 141		China
	October 22, 2017	Kunlun Fight City Hero 140		China
	October 7, 2017	Kunlun Fight City Hero 138		China
	September 23, 2017	Kunlun Fight City Hero 137		China
	September 22, 2017	Kunlun Fight City Hero 136		China
	September 10, 2017	Kunlun Fight City Hero 135		China
	September 9, 2017	Kunlun Fight City Hero 134		China
	September 8, 2017	Kunlun Fight City Hero 133		China
	September 2, 2017	Kunlun Fight City Hero 132		China
	August 28, 2017	Kunlun Fight City Hero 130		China
	August 27, 2017	Kunlun Fight City Hero 129		China
	August 19, 2017	Kunlun Fight City Hero 128		China
	August 9, 2017	Kunlun Fight City Hero 127		China
	August 5, 2017	Kunlun Fight City Hero 126		China
	July 29, 2017	Kunlun Fight City Hero 125		China
	July 29, 2017	Kunlun Fight City Hero 129		China
	July 29, 2017	Kunlun Fight City Hero 124		China
	July 24, 2017	Kunlun Fight City Hero 123		China
	July 22, 2017	Kunlun Fight City Hero 122		China
	July 22, 2017	Kunlun Fight City Hero 121		Qingzhou, China
	July 23, 2017	Kunlun Fight City Hero 120		China
	July 21, 2017	Kunlun Fight City Hero 119		China
	July 17, 2017	Kunlun Fight City Hero 118		Zingyi, China
	July 16, 2017	Kunlun Fight City Hero 117		Jixi, China
	July 16, 2017	Kunlun Fight City Hero 116		Zingyi, China
	July 15, 2017	Kunlun Fight City Hero 115		Zingyi, China
	July 15, 2017	Kunlun Fight City Hero 114		Jixi, China
	July 14, 2017	Kunlun Fight City Hero 113		Jixi, China
	July 9, 2017	Kunlun Fight City Hero 112		China
	July 8, 2017	Kunlun Fight City Hero 111		China
	July 8, 2017	Kunlun Fight City Hero 110		China
	July 7, 2017	Kunlun Fight City Hero 109		China
	July 7, 2017	Kunlun Fight City Hero 108		China
	June 30, 2017	Kunlun Fight City Hero 106		China
	June 24, 2017	Kunlun Fight City Hero 105		China
	June 24, 2017	Kunlun Fight City Hero 104		China
	June 18, 2017	Kunlun Fight City Hero 103		China
	June 18, 2017	Kunlun Fight City Hero 101		Langfang, China
	June 11, 2017	Kunlun Fight City Hero 100		Harbin, China
	June 10, 2017	Kunlun Fight City Hero 99		Harbin, China
	June 10, 2017	Kunlun Fight City Hero 98		Shenzhen, China
	June 7, 2017	Kunlun Fight City Hero 97		China
	May 29, 2017	Kunlun Fight City Hero 96		Guangxi, China
	May 20, 2017	Kunlun Fight City Hero		Bazhou, China
	May 15, 2017	Kunlun Fight City Hero		Haikou, China
	May 15, 2017	Kunlun Fight City Hero		Qingdao, China
	May 12, 2017	Kunlun Fight City Hero		Shenzhen, China
	May 1, 2017	Kunlun Fight City Hero		Harbin, China
	May 1, 2017	Kunlun Fight City Hero		Guangxi, China
	April 30, 2017	Kunlun Fight City Hero		Hui'an County, China
	April 30, 2017	Kunlun Fight City Hero		Harbin, China
	April 29, 2017	Kunlun Fight City Hero		Wuxi, China
	April 21, 2017	Kunlun Fight City Hero		Hong Kong
	April 15, 2017	Kunlun Fight City Hero		Quanzhou, China
	April 1, 2017	Kunlun Fight City Hero		Wuhan, China
	March 26, 2017	Kunlun Fight City Hero		Langfang, China
	March 23, 2017	Kunlun Fight City Hero		Sanya, China
	March 19, 2017	Kunlun Fight City Hero		Zhuhai, China
	March 18, 2017	Kunlun Fight City Hero		Qingdao, China
	March 3, 2017	Kunlun Fight City Hero		Sanya, China
	February 14, 2017	Kunlun Fight City Hero		Hong Kong
	February 14, 2017	Kunlun Fight City Hero		Quanzhou, China
	January 24, 2017	Kunlun Fight City Hero		Cenxi, China
	January 15, 2017	Kunlun Fight City Hero		Du'an, China
	January 4, 2017	Kunlun Fight City Hero		Sanya, China
	December 31, 2016	Kunlun Fight City Hero		Wenzhou, China
	December 25, 2016	Kunlun Fight City Hero		Harbin, China
	December 25, 2016	Kunlun Fight City Hero		Du'an, China
	December 24, 2016	Kunlun Fight City Hero		Harbin, China
	December 14, 2016	Kunlun Fight City Hero		Beijing, China
	December 4, 2016	Kunlun Fight City Hero		Wuhan, China
	November 26, 2016	Kunlun Fight City Hero		Chengdu, China
	November 19, 2016	Kunlun Fight City Hero		Chengdu, China
	November 19, 2016	Kunlun Fight City Hero		Beijing, China
	October 28, 2016	Kunlun Fight City Hero		Shenzhen, China
	October 23, 2016	Kunlun Fight City Hero		Wuhan, China
	October 17, 2016	Kunlun Fight City Hero		Chengdu, China
	October 16, 2016	Kunlun Fight City Hero		Guiyang, China
	October 15, 2016	Kunlun Fight City Hero		Guiyang, China
	October 14, 2016	Kunlun Fight City Hero		Shenzhen, China
	September 30, 2016	Kunlun Fight City Hero		Shenzhen, China
	September 30, 2016	Kunlun Fight City Hero		Chengdu, China
	September 28, 2016	Kunlun Fight City Hero		Bazhou, China
	September 17, 2016	Kunlun Fight City Hero		Wuhan, China
	September 10, 2016	Kunlun Fight City Hero		Taiyuan, China
	September 9, 2016	Kunlun Fight City Hero		Fujian, China
	August 27, 2016	Kunlun Fight City Hero		Taiyuan, China
	August 25, 2016	Kunlun Fight City Hero		China
	August 20, 2016	Kunlun Fight City Hero		Taiyuan, China
	August 17, 2016	Kunlun Fight City Hero		Baoding, China
	August 13, 2016	Kunlun Fight City Hero		Taiyuan, China
	August 8, 2016	Kunlun Fight City Hero		Suqian, China
	August 7, 2016	Kunlun Fight City Hero		Langfang, China
	August 6, 2016	Kunlun Fight City Hero		Taiyuan, China
	August 6, 2016	Kunlun Fight City Hero		Bazhou, China
	July 30, 2016	Kunlun Fight City Hero		Taiyuan, China
	July 23, 2016	Kunlun Fight City Hero		Taiyuan, China
	July 16, 2016	Kunlun Fight City Hero		Taiyuan, China
	July 12, 2016	Kunlun Fight City Hero		Nanjing, China
	July 11, 2016	Kunlun Fight City Hero		Nanjing, China
	July 10, 2016	Kunlun Fight City Hero		Shijiazhuang, China
	July 9, 2016	Kunlun Fight City Hero		Taiyuan, China
	July 9, 2016	Kunlun Fight City Hero		Beijing, China
	July 9, 2016	Kunlun Fight City Hero		Nanjing, China
	July 7, 2016	Kunlun Fight City Hero		Nanjing, China
	July 6, 2016	Kunlun Fight City Hero		Nanjing, China
	July 5, 2016	Kunlun Fight City Hero		Nanjing, China
	July 2, 2016	Kunlun Fight City Hero		Taiyuan, China
	July 1, 2016	Kunlun Fight City Hero		Handan, China
	June 25, 2016	Kunlun Fight City Hero		Taiyuan, China
	June 25, 2016	Kunlun Fight City Hero		Chengdu, China
	June 19, 2016	Kunlun Fight City Hero		Shijiazhuang, China
	June 18, 2016	Kunlun Fight City Hero		Taiyuan, China
	June 17, 2016	Kunlun Fight City Hero		Taiyuan, China
	June 4, 2016	Kunlun Fight City Hero		Taiyuan, China
	May 28, 2016	Kunlun Fight City Hero		Taiyuan, China
	May 28, 2016	Kunlun Fight City Hero		Suqian, China
	May 21, 2016	Kunlun Fight City Hero		Taiyuan, China
	May 20, 2016	Kunlun Fight City Hero		Chengdu, China
	May 13, 2016	Kunlun Fight City Hero		Chengdu, China
	May 11, 2016	Kunlun Fight City Hero		Taiyuan, China
	May 6, 2016	Kunlun Fight City Hero		Taiyuan, China
	April 29, 2016	Kunlun Fight City Hero		Chengdu, China
	April 23, 2016	Kunlun Fight City Hero		Taiyuan, China
	April 22, 2016	Kunlun Fight City Hero		Chengdu, China
	March 18, 2016	Kunlun Fight City Hero		Shenzhen, China

== Road to Kunlun events ==
#	Date	Event	Venue	Location
19	July 1, 2018	Road to Kunlun 19		Shenyang, China
18	June 9, 2018	Road to Kunlun 18		Jining, China
17	February 14, 2018	Road to Kunlun 17		Fushun, China
16	November 15, 2017	Road to Kunlun 16		Shijiazhuang, China
15	November 14, 2017	Road to Kunlun 15		Shijiazhuang, China
14	November 13, 2017	Road to Kunlun 14		Shijiazhuang, China
13	November 4, 2017	Road to Kunlun 13		Shijiazhuang, China
12	December 3, 2017	Road to Kunlun 12		Shijiazhuang, China
11	October 21, 2017	Road to Kunlun 11		Shijiazhuang, China
10	September 23, 2017	Road to Kunlun 10	Kunlun Fight World Combat Sports Center	Beijing, China
9	August 13, 2017	Road to Kunlun 9		Tangshan, China
8	August 4, 2017	Road to Kunlun 8		Shijiazhuang, China
7	July 1, 2017	Road to Kunlun 7		Pingshan, China
6	June 18, 2017	Road to Kunlun 6		Shijiazhuang, China
5	June 3, 2017	Road to Kunlun 5		Tianjin, China
4	May 13, 2017	Road to Kunlun 4		Tangshan, China
3	April 22, 2017	Road to Kunlun 3		Shijiazhuang, China
2	April 4, 2017	Road to Kunlun 2		Tangshan, China
1	March 4, 2017	Road to Kunlun 1		Hebei, China

== See also ==
- 2014 in Kunlun Fight
- 2015 in Kunlun Fight
- 2016 in Kunlun Fight
- 2017 in Kunlun Fight
- 2018 in Kunlun Fight
- 2019 in Kunlun Fight
- 2020 in Kunlun Fight
