= Hekou =

Hekou, meaning river mouth or estuary, is a common place name in China and may refer to the following in China:

== Districts (河口区) ==
- Hekou District, Dongying, Shandong

== Counties (河口县) ==
- Hekou Yao Autonomous County (河口瑶族自治县), of Honghe Hani and Yi Autonomous Prefecture, Yunnan

== Towns ==
=== (河口镇) ===
- Hekou, Huoqiu County, in Huoqiu County, Anhui
- Hekou, Foshan, in Sanshui District, Foshan, Guangdong
- Hekou, Luhe County, in Luhe County, Guangdong
- Hekou, Yangchun, in Yangchun City, Guangdong
- Hekou, Yunan County, in Yunan County, Guangdong
- Hekou, Dawu County, Hubei, in Dawu County, Hubei
- Hekou, Huangshi, in Xisaishan District, Huangshi, Hubei
- Hekou, Xiangtan County, in Xiangtan County, Hunan
- Hekou, Pei County, in Pei County, Jiangsu
- Hekou, Rudong County, in Rudong County, Jiangsu
- Hekou, Yanshan County, in Yanshan County, Jiangxi
- Hekou, Feng County, in Feng County, Shaanxi
- Hekou, Jiangyou, in Jiangyou City, Sichuan
- Hekou, Rong County, Sichuan, in Rong County, Sichuan
- Hekou, Wanyuan, in Wanyuan City, Sichuan
- Hekou, Yajiang County, in Yajiang County, Sichuan
- Hekou, Hekou County, in Hekou Yao Autonomous County, Yunnan
- Hekou, Xundian County, in Xundian Hui and Yi Autonomous County, Yunnan

=== (合口镇) ===
- Hekou, Linli, a town in Linli County, Hunan Province, China

== Townships (河口乡) ==
- Hekou Township, Lanzhou, in Xigu District, Lanzhou, Gansu
- Hekou Township, Daozhen County, in Daozhen Gelao and Miao Autonomous County, Guizhou
- Hekou Township, Jinping County, in Jinping County, Guizhou
- Hekou Township, Shunping County, in Shunping County, Hebei
- Hekou Township, Yuan'an County, in Yuan'an County, Hubei
- Hekou, Sangzhi, in Sangzhi County, Hunan
- Hekou Township, Lan County, in Lan County, Shanxi
- Hekou Township, Huili County, in Huili County, Sichuan
- Hekou Township, Renshou County, in Renshou County, Sichuan

== Villages (河口村) ==
- Hekou Village in Togtoh County, Inner Mongolia

== Subdistricts (河口街道) ==
- Hekou Subdistrict, Yunfu, in Yuncheng District, Yunfu, Guangdong
- Hekou Subdistrict, Baishan, in Hunjiang District, Baishan, Jilin
- Hekou Subdistrict, Dongying, in Hekou District, Dongying, Shandong

== Other uses ==
- Hekou Group, geological formation in Gansu
