= Yuelushannus baishaensis =

Scientific classification
- Kingdom: Animalia
- Phylum: Arthropoda
- Subphylum: Chelicerata
- Class: Arachnida
- Order: Araneae
- Infraorder: Araneomorphae
- Family: Linyphiidae
- Genus: Yuelushannus
- Species: Y. baishaensis

Binomial name
- Yuelushannus baishaensis Irfan, Zhang, Cai & Zhang, 2025

Dwarf spider species

Yuelushannus baishaensis is a species of dwarf spider in the family Linyphiidae, described in 2025 by Muhammad Irfan, Chang-Cheng Zhang, Yu-Jun Cai, and Zhi-Sheng Zhang. It is endemic to Baisha in the Jiangjin District of Chongqing, China.

== Etymology ==
The species name baishaensis refers to Baisha, the type locality where the species was first discovered.

== Diagnostic characteristics ==
Males of Yuelushannus baishaensis are distinguished by having a protegulum with two tooth-like projections on its side, compared to only one in the closely related species Yuelushannus barbatus.

Additionally, the embolus, a narrow tube used for sperm transfer, is almost as long as the width of the tegulum, while in Y. barbatus, it is significantly shorter.

The female of Y. baishaensis has an epigyne with a small, backward-curved scape, a structure absent in related species. Their spermathecae, the organs that store sperm, are nearly spherical, differing from the more elongated shape in similar spiders.
