= Shoulder Pole dance =

Traditional Chinese folk dance

Shoulder Pole Dance
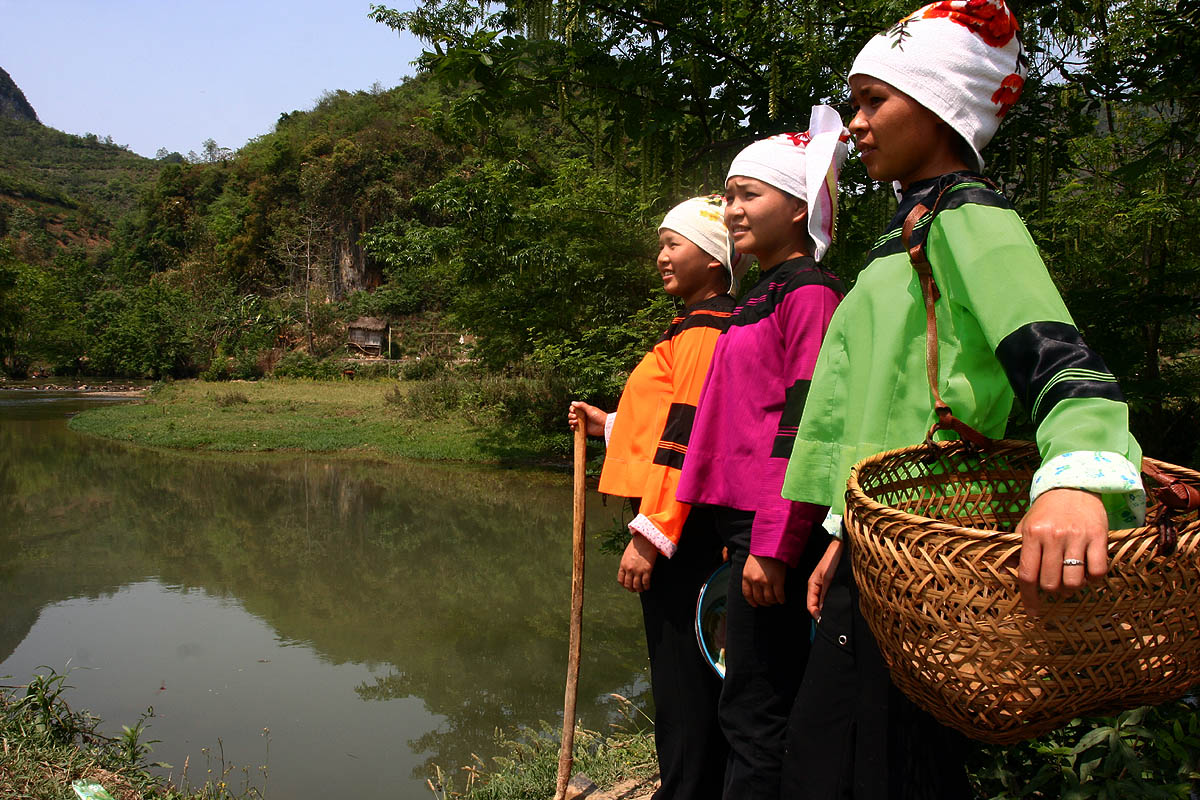
- Some Zhuang people with a shoulder pole
- Genre: Folk
- Inventor: Zhuang people

The Shoulder Pole dance (Chinese: 扁担舞), also known in the Zhuang language as Da Lu Lie (打虏列), is a traditional Chinese folk dance of the Zhuang ethnic group in China. It originated from the labor activity of pounding rice and evolved into a unique performance form using bamboo poles to rhythmically strike benches or troughs. The dance portrays agricultural scenes such as transplanting rice seedlings, harvesting, threshing, and pounding grain.

== Origin ==
According to local legend, the dance traces back to a period of Zhuang and Miao migration. In one story from Zhangpi Village, Leishan County, during a difficult migration, a man started to beat his shoulder pole and sickle in the silence of the night, sparking others to join him in rhythm and dance. Over time, this evolved into a communal form of expression that passed down generations. Initially, the dance involved striking a wooden plank over a pounding trough, but due to the trough's heaviness, long benches later replaced it.

== Performance style ==
The costumes for the performance are the daily clothes worn by Zhuang women, with a flowered headscarf, a slanted-collared top, traditional trousers, and a chest pocket. The dance is performed with even numbers of dancers, with performers standing on both sides of a bench, holding shoulder poles. They strike either the bench or each other's poles in synchronized rhythms, imitating various agricultural tasks. patterns include sequences such as "Planting Rice," "Fetching Water," and "Threshing." The rhythms range from 2/4 to 5/4 time, and sometimes are accompanied by bamboo tubes, drums, gongs, or cymbals. Some performances include four-part ensemble sections with diagonal crossing beats and elaborate transitions.

The performance is often accompanied by singing. It is commonly performed during festivals and celebrations.

The shoulder pole dance often appears as an opening dance or accompanying dance in Zhuang opera. Both are performed in Zhuang language. In some traditional Zhuang operas, the shoulder pole dance represents folk labor.

== Varieties ==
=== Mashan County ===
The shoulder pole dance in Mashan County has been noted for its particular movements and rhythm. It has been performed on the national stage as a representative dance of Guangxi ethnic groups. In the 1980s, Mashan shoulder pole dance participated in the National Minority Sports Games and won the first prize. In 2003, it also appeared in the "Bagui Carnival Tour" of the Nanning International Folk Song Festival. Mashan artist Wei Wenyao has made great contributions to the innovation and dissemination of shoulder pole dance. He focuses on combining traditional playing methods with modern choreography, giving shoulder pole dance a new artistic vitality.

== Spread ==
The carrying pole dance was once widely popular in Du'an, Mashan County Debao County, Ningming County, Pingguo County and other places in Guangxi Zhuang Autonomous Region.

In 2007, the Du'an Kangle Art Troupe performed in Beijing as a representative team to participate in the countdown party for the 2008 Summer Olympics.

== Outlook ==
With the development of the times and the shift of young people's interests, the shoulder pole dance once faced the risk of being lost. Today, with the promotion of the national intangible cultural heritage protection policy and the strengthening of local cultural awareness, a group of folk artists and cultural workers are committed to its preservation.
