= Zhiping Town, Chongqing =

Zhiping 支坪镇
- Town
- Location in Chongqing
- Coordinates: 29°14′37″N 106°23′9″E
- Country: People's Republic of China
- Direct-administered municipality: Chongqing
- District: Jiangjin District
- Time zone: UTC+8 (China Standard)

Zhiping (Chinese: 支坪; pinyin: Zhīpíng) is a town in Jiangjin District, Chongqing province, China. As of 2020, it administers the following six residential communities and two villages:

- Jinping Community (津坪社区)
- Rentuo Community (仁沱社区)
- Zhenwuchang Community (真武场社区)
- Baixi Community (白溪社区)
- Huapu Community (花铺社区)
- Zhongxing Community (中兴社区)
- Tiantang Village (天堂村)
- Renlong Village (仁龙村)

== See also ==
- List of township-level divisions of Chongqing
