= 2025 in Kunlun Fight =

Information
- First date: April 12, 2025

The year 2025 was the 12th year in the history of the Kunlun Fight, a kickboxing promotion based in China.

The events are broadcast on Jiangsu TV and streamed across ByteDance platforms Douyin, Xigua Video and Toutiao.

== List of Kunlun Fight 2025 events ==
#	Date	Event	Venue	Location
4	November 29, 2025	Kunlun Fight Elite Fight Night	Zaozhuang Sport and Culture Center Gymnasium	Zaozhuang, China
3	July 26, 2025	Kunlun Fight Elite Fight Night	Asilixisi Jiucaiping Sports Center	Bijie, China
2	July 5, 2025	Kunlun Fight 104	Kunlun Fight Stadium	Tongling, China
1	April 14, 2025	Kunlun Fight 103	China Film Studio	Beijing, China

== Kunlun Fight 103 ==
Kunlun Fight 103
- Promotion: Kunlun Fight
- Date: April 14, 2025
- Venue: China Film Studio
- City: Beijing, China

Kunlun Fight 103 is a kickboxing event held by Kunlun Fight on April 14, 2025, in Beijing, China. The event was originally scheduled for April 12, but was rescheduled due to extreme weather warnings given for the Beijing area.

=== Results ===
Kunlun Fight 103
Weight Class				Method	Round	Time	Notes
Kickboxing 61 kg	(China) Saliman Aobulihairi	def.	(Japan) Yuhei Tsuda	KO (Right hook)			
Kickboxing 70 kg	(China) Zhang Run	def.	(Brazil) Vitor Toffanelli	Decision	3	3:00	
Kickboxing 90 kg	(Bosnia and Herzegovina) Albert Ugrinčić	def.	(China) Zhang Mingyan	TKO	4	1:24	
Kickboxing 56 kg	(China) Ying Yue	def.	(Iran) Zahra Shokouhi	Decision (Unanimous)	3	3:00	
Kickboxing 63 kg	(China) Li Jianglong	def.	(Iran) Morteza Goodarzi	KO	1		
Kickboxing 61 kg	(China) Zhou Jialong	def.	(Romania) Daniel Handrea	TKO	2		
Kickboxing 70 kg	(Brazil) Marcos Alves	def.	(China) Meng Lingkuo	TKO	1		
Kickboxing 66 kg	(China) Wang Penghui	def.	(Russia) Tamerlan Akhmadov	TKO			

== Kunlun Fight 104 ==
Kunlun Fight 104
- Promotion: Kunlun Fight
- Date: July 5, 2025
- Venue: Kunlun Fight Stadium
- City: Tongling, China

Kunlun Fight 104 is a kickboxing event held by Kunlun Fight on July 7, 2025, in Tongling, China. The event was the first Kunlun Fight event to feature humanoid robot fights. The robots used were the Unitree G1.

=== Results ===
Kunlun Fight 104
Weight Class				Method	Round	Time	Notes
Kickboxing 70 kg	(China) Zhang Run	def.	(South Korea) Jin Sijun	Decision (Unanimous)	3	3:00	
Kickboxing 61 kg	(China) Saliman Aobulihairi	vs.	(Georgia (country)) Tophik Abdullaev	TKO	1		
Women's Kickboxing 39 kg	(China) Shao Zhengyi	def.	(China) Chen Jinxin	TKO	2		
Kickboxing 63 kg	(China) Siwakorn	def.	(China) Li Jialong	Decision	3	3:00	
Kickboxing 61 kg	(China) Zhou Jialong	def.	(Thailand) Kueakak	Decision (Unanimous)	3	3:00	
Kickboxing 65 kg	(China) An Ran	def.	(South Korea) Nam Myeong-Cheon	KO	2		
Women's Kickboxing 52 kg	(China) Kuang Fei	def.	(Thailand) Nongparnfah	Decision (Split)	3	3:00	
Kickboxing 61 kg	(Thailand) Yodkitti Tor.Tepsutin	def.	(China) Lin Huo	Decision (Split)	3	3:00	
Robot Kickboxing	雷選龙龙	def.	昆仑闪闪	Decision	1	2	Tournament Final
Robot Kickboxing	昆仑闪闪	def.	铁拳唐唐	Decision	1	2	Tournament Semifinal 2
Robot Kickboxing	雷選龙龙	def.	袋鼠达达	Decision	1	2	Tournament Semifinal 1

== Kunlun Fight Elite Fight Night ==
Kunlun Fight Elite Fight Night
- Promotion: Kunlun Fight
- Date: July 5, 2025
- Venue: Asilixisi Jiucaiping Sports Center
- City: Bijie, China

Kunlun Fight Elite Fight Night is a kickboxing event held by Kunlun Fight on July 26, 2025, in Bijie, China.

=== Results ===
Kunlun Fight Elite Fight Night
Weight Class				Method	Round	Time	Notes
Kickboxing kg	(China) Zhang Run	def.	(France) Bevan Ali Oguz	Ext.R Decision (Split)	4	3:00	
Kickboxing 67 kg	(China) Liu Chunrui	def.	(Thailand) Yodphayak Sayhuaithalang	Decision	3	3:00	
Kickboxing 65kg	(China) An Ran	def.	(Armenia) Hayk Vardanyan	TKO	1		
Kickboxing 61 kg	(China) Yang Shengqiao	def.	(China) Gong Yuankun	TKO	2		
Kickboxing 70 kg	(China) Xu Zhihao	def.	(China) Wang Yuanhao	Decision	3	3:00	
Kickboxing 68 kg	(China) Yi Chao	def.	(China) Zhu Xiaohao	Decision	3	3:00	
Kickboxing 60 kg	(China) Zhong Yu	def.	(China) Xing Youyu	Decision	3	3:00	
Kickboxing 57 kg	(China) Li Zhiyun	vs.	(China) Wang Likai				

== See also ==
- List of Kunlun Fight events
- 2025 in Wu Lin Feng
- 2025 in Glory
- 2025 in K-1
- 2025 in RISE
- 2025 in ONE Championship
- 2025 in Romanian kickboxing
