= Yuelushannus =

Scientific classification
- Kingdom: Animalia
- Phylum: Arthropoda
- Subphylum: Chelicerata
- Class: Arachnida
- Order: Araneae
- Infraorder: Araneomorphae
- Family: Linyphiidae
- Genus: Yuelushannus; Irfan, Zhou, Bashir, Mukhtar & Peng, 2020

Type species
- Y. barbatus Irfan, Zhou, Bashir, Mukhtar & Peng, 2020

Species
- Yuelushannus alatus Irfan, Zhou, Bashir, Mukhtar & Peng, 2020; Yuelushannus barbatus Irfan, Zhou, Bashir, Mukhtar & Peng, 2020

Genus of spiders

Yuelushannus is a small genus of east Asian sheet weavers in the family Linyphiidae. It was first described by Muhammad Irfan, G. C. Zhou, S. Bashir, M. Mukhtar, and X. Peng in 2020, and it has only been found in the Hunan and Hubei provinces of China. The genus name is derived from the type locality, Yuelu Mountain in the province of Hunan.

== Species ==
As of July 2025, the genus contains three species, all endemic to China:

- Yuelushannus alatus Irfan, Zhou, Bashir, Mukhtar & Peng, 2020 – China
- Yuelushannus barbatus Irfan, Zhou, Bashir, Mukhtar & Peng, 2020 – China
- Yuelushannus baishaensis Irfan, Zhang, Cai & Zhang, 2025 – China
