= Simian Mountain =

Mountain in People's Republic of China

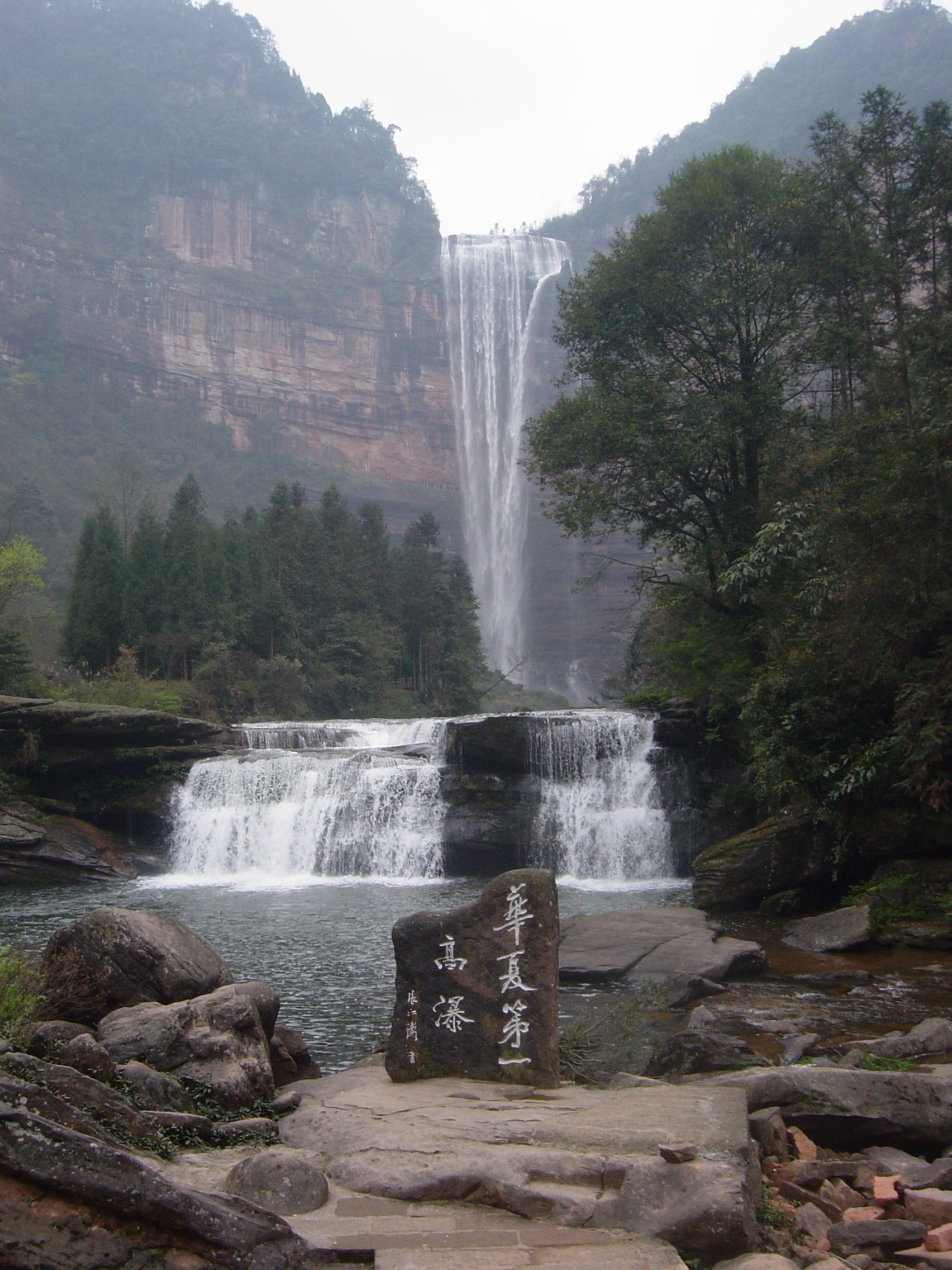
The waterfall on Simian Mountain, Jiangjin District, Chongqing.

Simian Mountain (四面山, Sìmiàn Shān), located in the north part of Jiangjin District, Chongqing, China, is a transitive zone between the Yunnan–Guizhou Plateau and the Sichuan Basin. Because of the hot, humid climate and abundant rainfall, the area is heavily forested.

It is the location of several significant waterfalls. Wangxiangtai (the Balcony of Nostalgia) Waterfall, 150 meters high and 40 meters wide, is one of the well-known waterfalls in China, and consists of many small waterfalls; Shuikoushi Waterfall is noted for its grand scale.

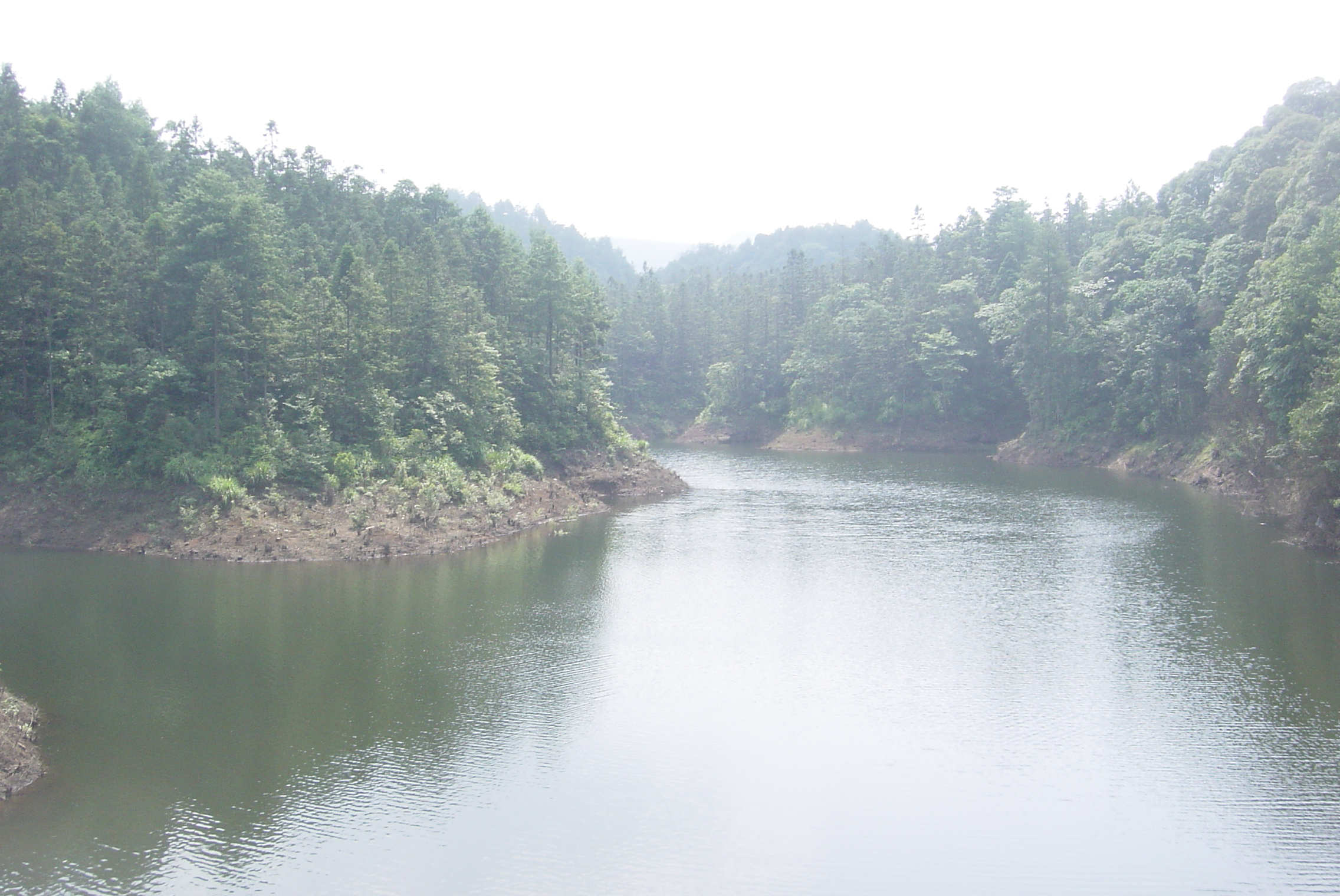
Simian Mountain, Jiangjin, Chongqing

Snaking its way among the valleys on Simian Mountain, the current of Chaba River feeds a number of lakes, of which the most majestic one is known as Great Red Sea.
