= Daxing, Guangxi =

Daxing 大兴镇
- Town
- Location in Guangxi
- Coordinates: 24°9′37″N 107°59′9″E
- Country: People's Republic of China
- Autonomous region: Guangxi
- Prefecture-level city: Hechi
- Autonomous county: Du'an Yao Autonomous County
- Time zone: UTC+8 (China Standard)

Daxing (simplified Chinese: 大兴; traditional Chinese: 大興; pinyin: Dàxīng) is a town under the administration of Du'an Yao Autonomous County, Guangxi, China. As of 2018, it has 13 villages under its administration.
