= Togtoh County =

Togtoh County 托克托县 • ᠲᠣᠭᠲᠠᠬᠤ ᠰᠢᠶᠠᠨ Tokoto
- County
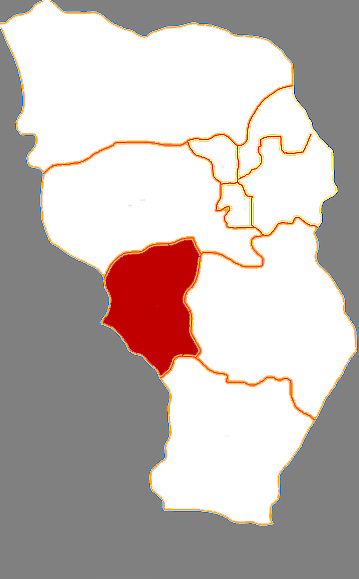

- Location in Inner Mongolia Togtoh (China)
- Coordinates: 40°17′N 111°12′E
- Country: China
- Autonomous region: Inner Mongolia
- Prefecture-level city: Hohhot
- County seat: Shuanghe Town

Area
  - Total: 1,313 km^{2} (507 sq mi)
- Elevation: 1,018 m (3,340 ft)

Population (2020)
  - Total: 166,192
  - Density: 126.6/km^{2} (327.8/sq mi)
- Time zone: UTC+8 (China Standard)
- Website: www.tuoxian.gov.cn

Togtoh County

Chinese name
- Simplified Chinese: 托克托县
- Traditional Chinese: 託克託縣
Transcriptions
Standard Mandarin
- Hanyu Pinyin: Tuōkètuō Xiàn

Mongolian name
- Mongolian Cyrillic: Тогтох шянь
- Mongolian script: ᠲᠣᠭᠲᠠᠬᠤ ᠰᠢᠶᠠᠨ
Transcriptions
- SASM/GNC: Toɣtaqu siyan

Togtoh County (Mongolian: ᠲᠣᠭᠲᠠᠬᠤ ᠰᠢᠶᠠᠨ; Chinese: 托克托县) is a county of Inner Mongolia Autonomous Region, North China, it is under the administration of the prefecture-level city of Hohhot, the capital of Inner Mongolia, located on the north bank of the Yellow River at which point that great river turns out of the Ordos Loop toward the south. It is under the administration of the regional capital of Hohhot, 78 kilometres (48 mi) to the northeast, with a population of around 166,192.

Its villages include Hekou, formerly known as Hokow and Tchagan Kouren, which was once an important caravan center on the north bend of the Yellow River.

== Administrative divisions ==
Togtoh County is made up of 5 towns.

Name	Simplified Chinese	Hanyu Pinyin	Mongolian (Hudum Script)	Mongolian (Cyrillic)	Administrative division code
Towns
Shuanghe Town	双河镇	Shuānghé Zhèn	ᠱᠤᠸᠠᠩ ᠾᠧ ᠪᠠᠯᠭᠠᠰᠤ	Сойн ге балгас	150122100
Xinyingzi Town	新营子镇	Xīnyíngzi Zhèn	ᠰᠢᠨ᠎ᠡ ᠶᠢᠩᠽᠢ ᠪᠠᠯᠭᠠᠰᠤ	Шинэ енз балгас	150122101
Wushen Town	五申镇	Wǔshēn Zhèn	ᠦᠦᠰᠢᠨ ᠪᠠᠯᠭᠠᠰᠤ	Үүшин балгас	150122102
Wushijia Town	伍什家镇	Wǔshíjiā Zhèn	ᠡᠦ ᠱᠢ ᠵᠢᠶᠠ ᠪᠠᠯᠭᠠᠰᠤ	Үү ши жье балгас	150122103
Gucheng Town	古城镇	Gǔchéng Zhèn	ᠭᠦ᠋ ᠴᠧᠩ ᠪᠠᠯᠭᠠᠰᠤ	Хөө цэн балгас	150122104

Other:

- Togtoh Industrial Park (托克托工业园区, ᠲᠣᠭᠲᠠᠬᠤ ᠠᠵᠤ ᠦᠢᠯᠡᠳᠪᠦᠷᠢ ᠶᠢᠨ ᠬᠦᠷᠢᠶᠡᠯᠡᠩ)

== Climate ==
Climate data for Togtoh, elevation 1,016 m (3,333 ft), (1991–2020 normals, extremes 1981–2010)
Month	Jan	Feb	Mar	Apr	May	Jun	Jul	Aug	Sep	Oct	Nov	Dec	Year
Record high °C (°F)	8.4 (47.1)	18.2 (64.8)	25.2 (77.4)	35.1 (95.2)	36.0 (96.8)	40.5 (104.9)	38.8 (101.8)	36.1 (97.0)	35.0 (95.0)	28.4 (83.1)	20.2 (68.4)	11.0 (51.8)	40.5 (104.9)
Mean daily maximum °C (°F)	−3.8 (25.2)	1.8 (35.2)	9.6 (49.3)	18.2 (64.8)	24.4 (75.9)	28.8 (83.8)	30.3 (86.5)	28.1 (82.6)	23.1 (73.6)	15.8 (60.4)	6.0 (42.8)	−2.0 (28.4)	15.0 (59.0)
Daily mean °C (°F)	−10.9 (12.4)	−5.5 (22.1)	2.4 (36.3)	10.9 (51.6)	17.4 (63.3)	22.0 (71.6)	23.9 (75.0)	21.7 (71.1)	16.1 (61.0)	8.5 (47.3)	−0.5 (31.1)	−8.5 (16.7)	8.1 (46.6)
Mean daily minimum °C (°F)	−16.2 (2.8)	−11.2 (11.8)	−3.7 (25.3)	3.7 (38.7)	10.1 (50.2)	15.1 (59.2)	17.9 (64.2)	16.1 (61.0)	10.3 (50.5)	2.9 (37.2)	−5.3 (22.5)	−13.3 (8.1)	2.2 (36.0)
Record low °C (°F)	−28.1 (−18.6)	−26.4 (−15.5)	−20.6 (−5.1)	−9.9 (14.2)	−1.5 (29.3)	2.6 (36.7)	9.9 (49.8)	7.0 (44.6)	−0.8 (30.6)	−8.6 (16.5)	−25.9 (−14.6)	−29.7 (−21.5)	−29.7 (−21.5)
Average precipitation mm (inches)	3.3 (0.13)	4.4 (0.17)	10.0 (0.39)	18.7 (0.74)	32.7 (1.29)	40.7 (1.60)	87.7 (3.45)	75.0 (2.95)	52.6 (2.07)	23.5 (0.93)	11.1 (0.44)	3.3 (0.13)	363 (14.29)
Average precipitation days (≥ 0.1 mm)	2.2	2.6	3.4	3.8	6.3	8.7	10.7	10.0	8.8	4.8	3.2	2.4	66.9
Average snowy days	3.3	3.4	2.6	0.8	0.2	0	0	0	0	0.3	2.5	3.4	16.5
Average relative humidity (%)	58	50	41	35	37	46	59	63	61	56	57	57	52
Mean monthly sunshine hours	198.6	202.2	249.5	272.5	295.6	278.2	264.8	259.3	231.7	225.6	191.6	190.3	2,859.9
Percentage possible sunshine	66	66	67	68	66	62	59	62	63	66	65	66	65
Source: China Meteorological Administration
