= Jiangjin, Chongqing =

Coordinates: 29°17′26″N 106°15′15″E

Jiangjin 江津区 Kiangtsing
- District
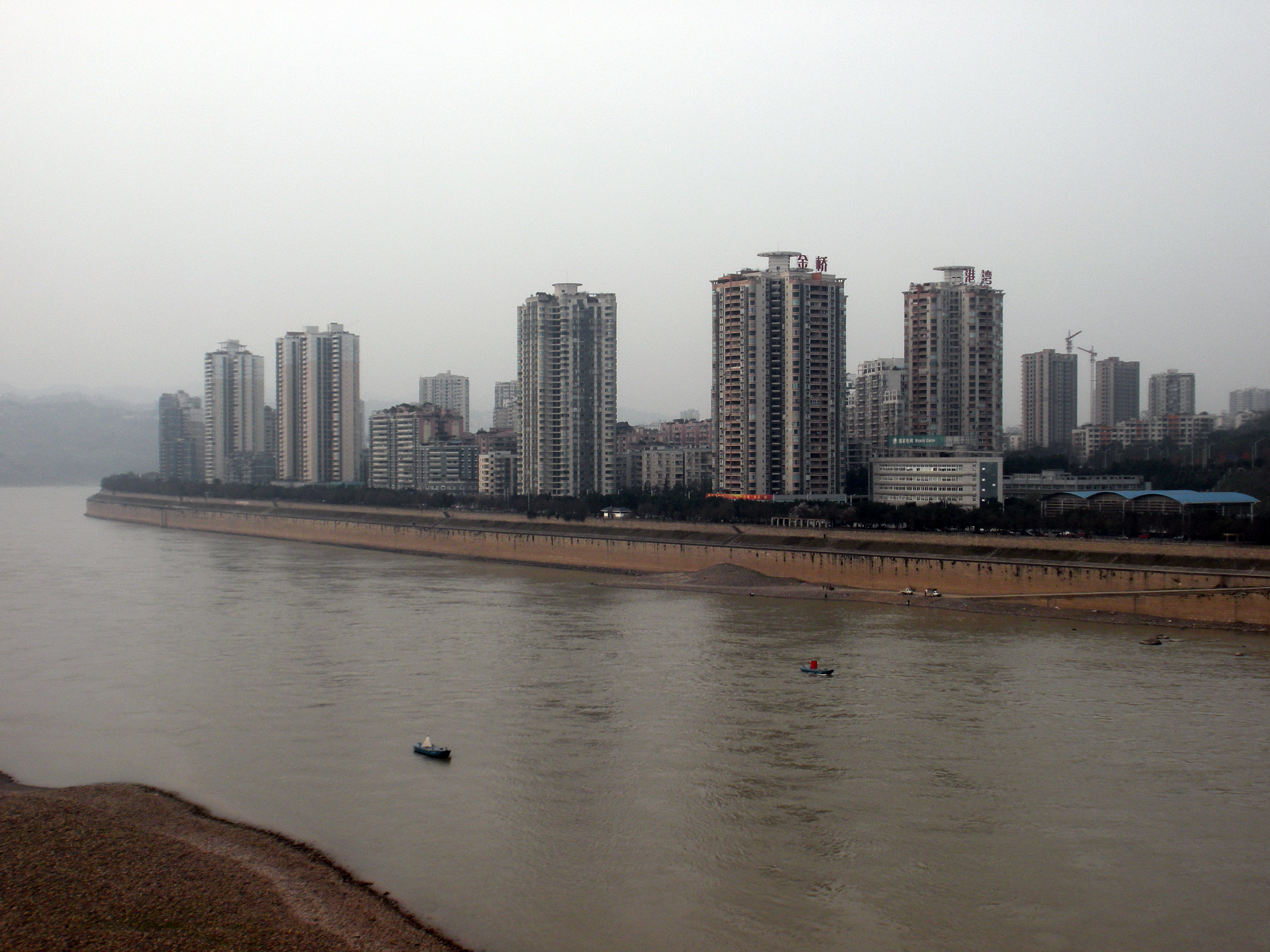
- View of Jijiang Subdistrict across the Yangtze River

- Jiangjin District in Chongqing
- Interactive map of Jiangjin
- Country: People's Republic of China
- Municipality: Chongqing

Area
  - District: 3,216 km^{2} (1,242 sq mi)

Population (2020 census)
  - District: 1,359,611
  - Density: 422.8/km^{2} (1,095/sq mi)
  - Urban: 817,888 (60%)
  - Rural: 541,723 (40%)
- Time zone: UTC+8 (China Standard)

Jiangjin District (Chinese: 江津区; pinyin: Jiāngjīn Qū), one of the districts in the southwest of Chongqing, China, lies along the upper reaches of Yangtze River, and has a history extending back more than 1500 years. The district covers 3200 square kilometres and has a population of 1,359,611 in 2020, and borders the provinces of Sichuan to the southwest and Guizhou to the south. The district government seat of Jiangjin District is 50 km (31 mi) away by highway, 65 km (40 mi) away by railway and 72 km (45 mi) away by waterway from Yuzhong District in central Chongqing.

== Administrative divisions ==
Jiangjin District administers 25 townships and 5 subdistricts.

Name	Chinese (S)	Hanyu Pinyin	Population (2010)	Area (km^{2})
Jijiang Subdistrict	几江街道	Jǐjiāng Jiēdào	196,787	35.2
Dingshan Subdistrict	鼎山街道	Dǐngshān Jiēdào	196,787	33.35
Degan Subdistrict	德感街道	Dégǎn Jiēdào	83,950	122.8
Shuangfu Subdistrict	双福街道	Shuāngfú Jiēdào	47,962	66
Shengquan Subdistrict	圣泉街道	Shèngquán Jiēdào	not established	
Youxi town	油溪镇	Yóuxī Zhèn	63,386	154.11
Wutan town	吴滩镇	Wútān Zhèn	29,206	51.3
Shimen town	石门镇	Shímén Zhèn	35,665	65.5
Zhuyang town	朱杨镇	Zhūyáng Zhèn	26,335	55
Shima town	石蟆镇	Shímá Zhèn	69,881	202
Yongxing town	永兴镇	Yǒngxìng Zhèn	32,535	162
Tanghe town	塘河镇	Tánghé Zhèn	13,813	64
Baisha town	白沙镇	Báishā Zhèn	115,761	238
Longhua town	龙华镇	Lónghuá Zhèn	27,849	84.81
Lishi town	李市镇	Lǐshì Zhèn	66,620	183
Ciyun town	慈云镇	Cíyún Zhèn	18,551	27.5
Caijia town	蔡家镇	Càijiā Zhèn	43,922	230
Zhongshan town	中山镇	Zhōngshān Zhèn	20,509	56
Jiaping town	嘉平镇	Jiāpíng Zhèn	18,883	52
Bailin town	柏林镇	Bǎilín Zhèn	38,564	91.5
Siping town	四屏镇	Sìpíng Zhèn	38,564	60
Xianfeng town	先锋镇	Xiānfēng Zhèn	48,586	50.4
Luohuang town	珞璜镇	Luòhuáng Zhèn	71,515	148.5
Jiasi town	贾嗣镇	Jiǎsì Zhèn	27,327	83.92
Xiaba town	夏坝镇	Xiàbà Zhèn	17,486	39.4
Xihu town	西湖镇	Xīhú Zhèn	38,386	143
Dushi town	杜市镇	Dùshì Zhèn	26,879	55
Guangxing town	广兴镇	Guǎngxìng Zhèn	11,222	40
Simianshan town	四面山镇	Sìmiànshān Zhèn	4,889	255.2
Zhiping town	支坪镇	Zhīpíng Zhèn	36,680	81

== History ==
Jiangjin enjoys a history of more than 1,500 years. Established in 487 CE, Jiangzhou County was renamed Jiangyang County in 557 CE and renamed Jiangyang County in 583 CE. In 1983, Jiangjin County placed under the administration of Chongqing city. In 1992, the Jiangjin County was promoted to a county-level city. In 2006, the status of Jiangjin county-level city was changed to Jiangjin District, a district of Chongqing.

== Geographical setting ==
Jiangjin lies within central China at 105°49′—106°38′of longitude and 28°28′—29°28′of north latitude. The landscape and topography of Jiangjin slopes from high elevations in the south and low in the north. Luohuangzhongba stands at the lowest elevation (178.5 m). The highest site, Wugongba in Simian Mountain, reaches an elevation of 1709.4 m. The average elevation of downtown Jiangjin is 209.7 m, with a flood stage designated at an elevation of 199.13 m.

== Climate and weather ==
The subtropical monsoon climate features an annual average temperature of 18.3 °C (64.9 °F), a monthly average temperature of 8.0 °C (46.4 °F) in January and 28.0 °C (82.4 °F) in July, with total annual radiation of 1273.6 hrs, total annual rainfall of 1,000.9 mm (39.41 in), a frost-free period of 341 days and annual average relative humidity of 81%.

Climate data for Jiangjin, elevation 261 m (856 ft), (1991–2020 normals, extremes 1981–present)
Month	Jan	Feb	Mar	Apr	May	Jun	Jul	Aug	Sep	Oct	Nov	Dec	Year
Record high °C (°F)	19.2 (66.6)	24.5 (76.1)	35.3 (95.5)	36.0 (96.8)	39.4 (102.9)	38.3 (100.9)	41.2 (106.2)	44.3 (111.7)	42.9 (109.2)	35.8 (96.4)	29.5 (85.1)	19.9 (67.8)	44.3 (111.7)
Mean daily maximum °C (°F)	10.7 (51.3)	13.9 (57.0)	18.9 (66.0)	24.2 (75.6)	27.5 (81.5)	29.7 (85.5)	33.8 (92.8)	34.1 (93.4)	28.8 (83.8)	22.2 (72.0)	17.5 (63.5)	11.9 (53.4)	22.8 (73.0)
Daily mean °C (°F)	8.2 (46.8)	10.5 (50.9)	14.6 (58.3)	19.3 (66.7)	22.6 (72.7)	25.1 (77.2)	28.5 (83.3)	28.5 (83.3)	24.1 (75.4)	18.8 (65.8)	14.4 (57.9)	9.5 (49.1)	18.7 (65.6)
Mean daily minimum °C (°F)	6.4 (43.5)	8.3 (46.9)	11.7 (53.1)	15.9 (60.6)	19.2 (66.6)	22.0 (71.6)	24.7 (76.5)	24.5 (76.1)	21.1 (70.0)	16.7 (62.1)	12.4 (54.3)	7.9 (46.2)	15.9 (60.6)
Record low °C (°F)	−0.2 (31.6)	1.1 (34.0)	0.3 (32.5)	7.0 (44.6)	10.3 (50.5)	15.5 (59.9)	18.3 (64.9)	18.6 (65.5)	15.0 (59.0)	7.1 (44.8)	3.6 (38.5)	−0.9 (30.4)	−0.9 (30.4)
Average precipitation mm (inches)	17.8 (0.70)	18.8 (0.74)	45.2 (1.78)	95.4 (3.76)	129.4 (5.09)	175.0 (6.89)	154.6 (6.09)	127.9 (5.04)	105.3 (4.15)	83.8 (3.30)	45.8 (1.80)	23.0 (0.91)	1,022 (40.25)
Average precipitation days (≥ 0.1 mm)	10.4	9.3	11.9	14.2	16.4	16.5	11.5	11.0	13.3	16.5	12.1	11.3	154.4
Average snowy days	0.2	0	0	0	0	0	0	0	0	0	0	0.2	0.4
Average relative humidity (%)	82	78	75	76	77	82	75	72	79	85	84	84	79
Mean monthly sunshine hours	23.7	39.9	81.5	112.8	118.2	108.8	189.7	189.8	112.5	55.3	43.6	23.5	1,099.3
Percentage possible sunshine	7	13	22	29	28	26	45	47	31	16	14	7	24
Source: China Meteorological Administration all-time January high

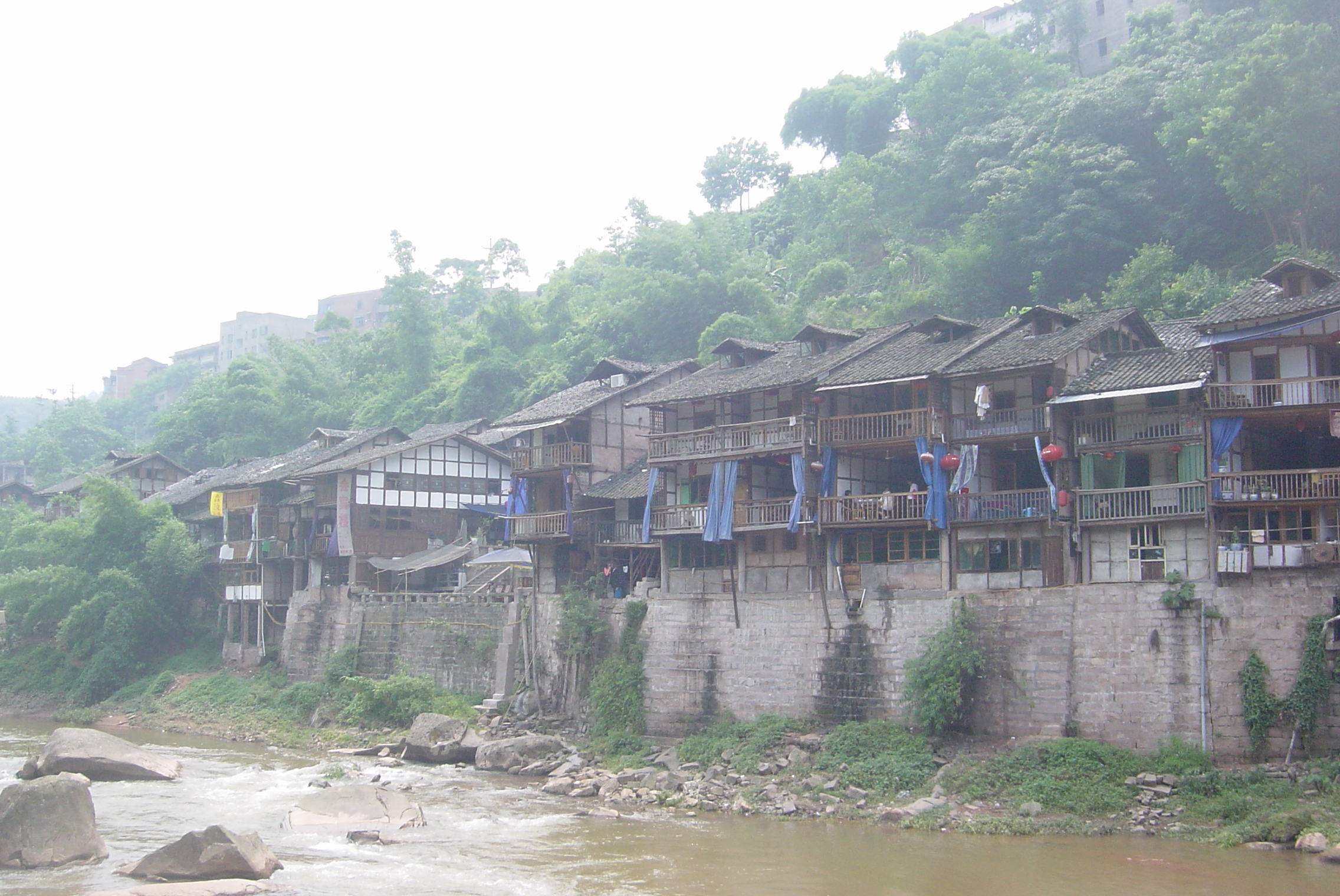
A view of Zhongshan Ancient Town, Jiangjin District, Chongqing

== Transportation ==
At present, six national-level highways provide transportation corridors to Jiangjin. For example, both the Chengdu-Chongqing and Yuqin freeways serve to ease traffic problems in Jiangjin. The Luohuang Yangtse River Railway Bridge and Jiangjin Yangtze River Bridge provide convenient access to Jiangjin. The Yangtze River pass through Jiangjin, creating a 305 km (190 mi) long waterway when including tributary waterways in the District; Jiangjin has five nationally recognized deep-watered ports along its rivers. Jiangjin District is well connected to the Chongqing city center via three major highway. Just 50 mins drive from Chongqing Jiangbei International Airport to Jiangjin.

=== Chongqing Rail Transit ===
Jiangjin District is served by Jiangtiao line of Chongqing Rail Transit.

== Economy ==
Jiangjin, as one of several citrus producing areas in China, has a long history of citrus cultivation. The 'Jincheng' orange originated here. Major agricultural products include rice, wheat, soybean, sweet potato, pepper corn, vegetables and fruits. Animal husbandry includes pig farms and fisheries.

In 2006, the total annual GDP was CNY14.894 billion and the annual average income per copita is CNY10,458 in Jangjin. It posted the 7th highest GDP in 2016. Zhiping country is the key focus of high end development in 2017. Large Chinese residential developers were turned away without an exciting development proposal despite offering high RMB2m per acre. Third Communist Liberation Army will be relocated to Zhiping with a massive 1500 acres of land, providing medical services, military training and housing facilities for high-ranking military officers and families.

== Tourism ==
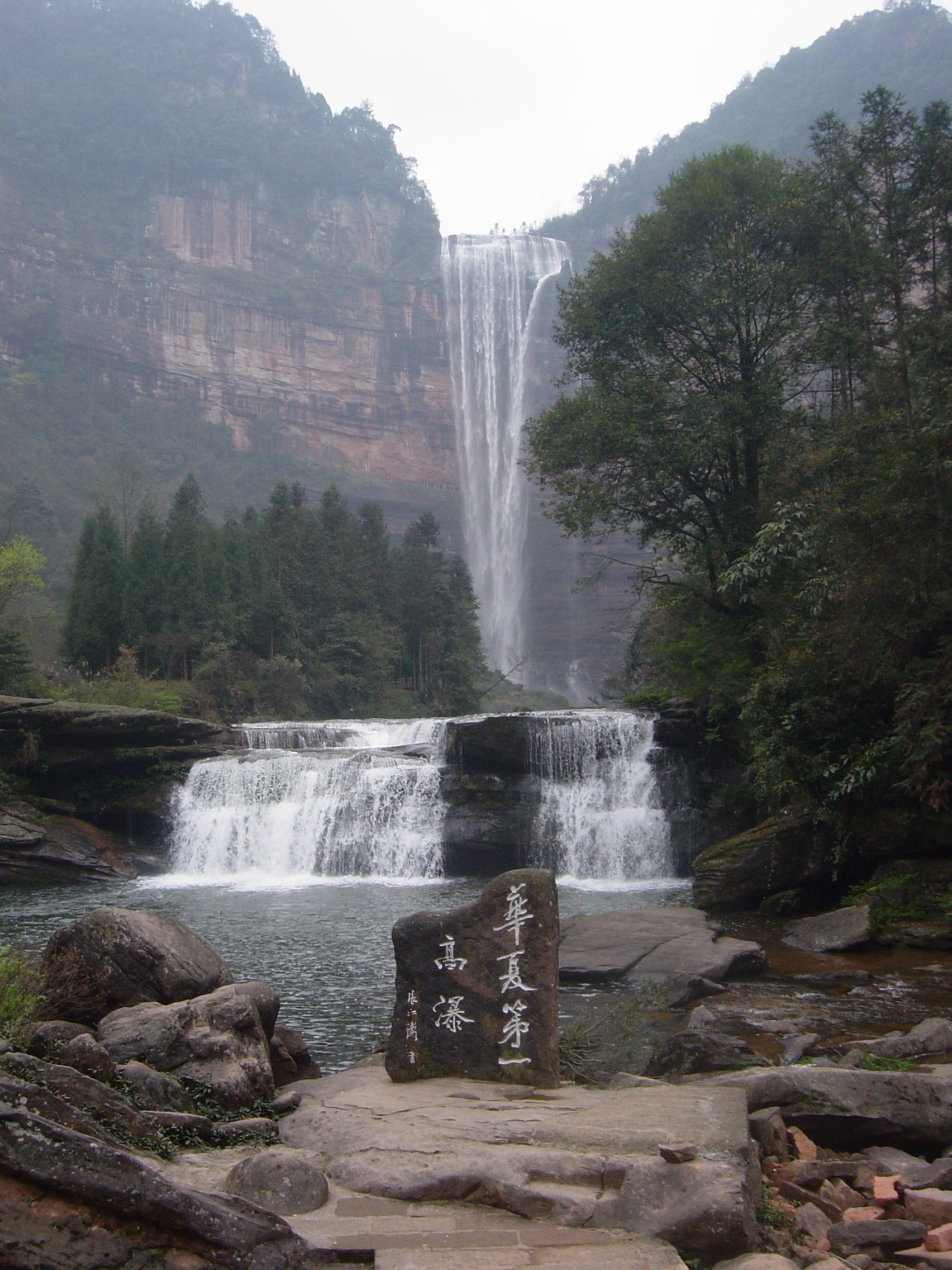
The waterfall in Simian Mountain, Jiangjin District, Chongqing.

One of the tourist attractions in Jiangjin District, Simian Mountain, is known for its natural environment, forests, lakes, rivers and waterfalls. It is located approximately 140 km (87 mi) from the Chongqing downtown area. Another tourist attraction is the Zhongshan Ancient Town, with a historical record of its existence dating 850 or so years back to the Song dynasty. A more recent tourist attraction is Aiqing Tianti, a mountain path with 6,000 steps built by Liu Guogang for his wife Xu Zhaoqing. The path is seen as a symbol of dedication and love between Liu and Xu and tourists visit the path to their secluded home.

== Special local products ==
Jiangjin is known for its production of Laobaigan, a strong limpid liquor usually with an alcohol level of near or above 60 proof. Mihuatang, sweet and crisp dessert produced in Jiangjin, is mainly made of puffed rice and sesame.

== Sister city ==
Jiangjin is twinned with:

- Seinäjoki, Finland

== See also ==
- Chongqing
