= Hekou Village =

Village in China

Hekou
- Chinese: 河口
- Postal: Hokow
- Literal meaning: River Mouth
Transcriptions
Standard Mandarin
- Hanyu Pinyin: Hékǒu
- Wade–Giles: Ho-k‘ou

Former names

Mongolian name
- Mongolian Cyrillic: Цагаан Хүрээ
- Mongolian script: ᠴᠠᠭᠠᠨ ᠬᠦᠷᠢᠶ᠎ᠡ
Transcriptions
- SASM/GNC: Tsagaan Hüree; Čaɣan Küriy-e

Hekou is a village under the administration of the town of Shuanghe in Togtoh County, Inner Mongolia, China.

== Names ==
The Chinese name of the village—romanized as Hokow for the Postal Map—derives from its location near the mouth of the Dahei River (大黑河, Dàhēi Hé, “Great Black River”).

In Mongolian, it was formerly known as Tchagan Kouren (“White Enclosure” or “Camp”), Dugus, or Dugei. The name was sometimes shortened to "Tchagan" in English.

== Geography ==
Hekou lies at the confluence of the Dahei River with the Yellow River on the northern curve of the Ordos Loop. It is separated by an escarpment and some farmland from the county seat of Shuanghe, about 3 km (2 mi) to its northeast. The provincial capital Hohhot lies about 80 km (50 mi) in the same direction.

Hekou is widely considered to mark the boundary between the Upper and Middle sections of the Yellow River. Lying at the northeastern end of the Ordos Desert, the confluence of the Dahei with the Yellow River marks the beginning of a series of major inflows from the Loess Plateau that greatly increase the river's volume and siltation after a long period of relative calm.

== History ==
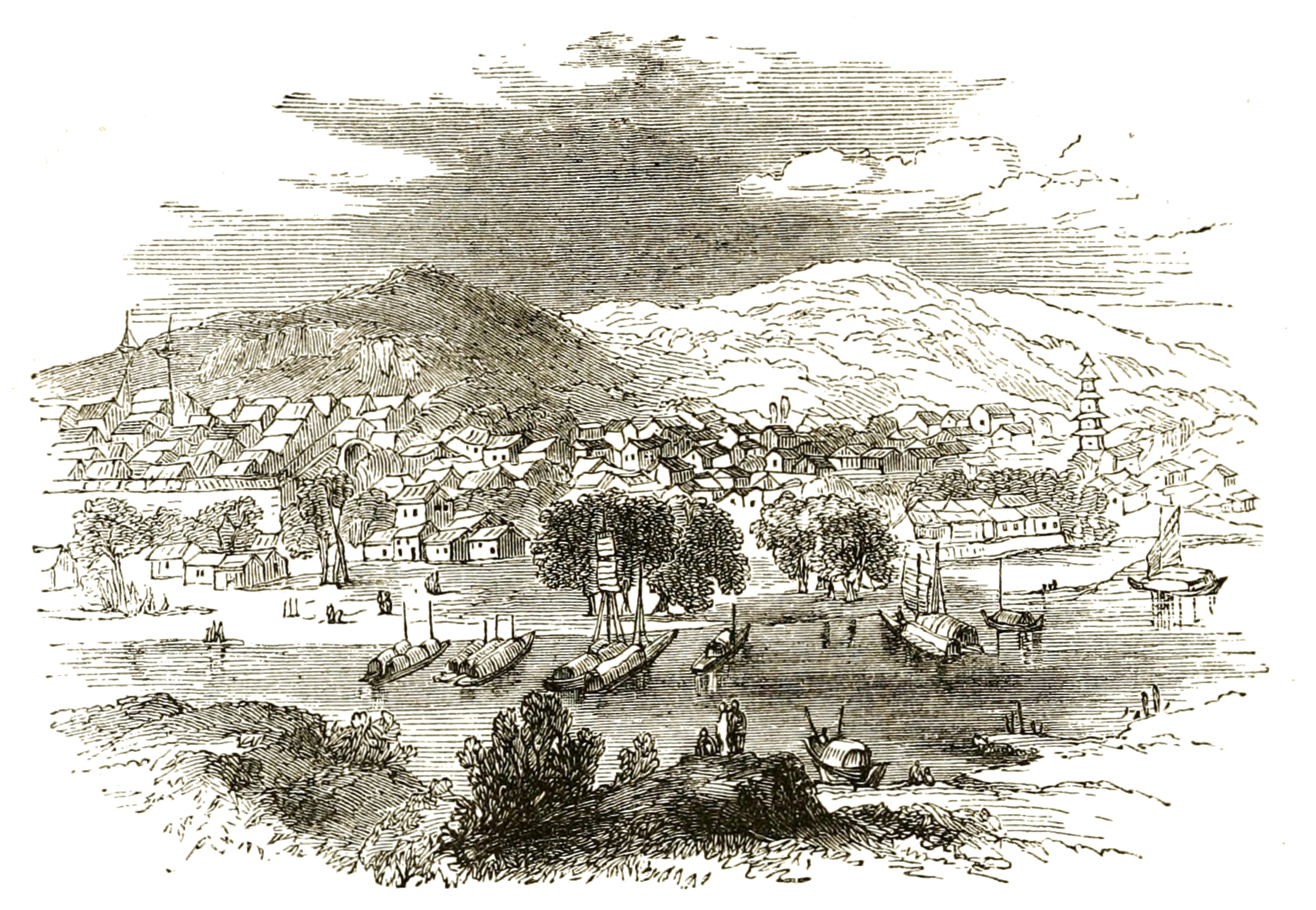
"Tchagan-Kouren" in an 1851 English translation of Abbé Huc's travelogue

In the first half of the 19th century, Hekou was planned out with broad streets and large public squares lines with shade trees, something entirely unusual in northern China at the time. It was well-protected from the floods of the Yellow River by large embankments decorated with willows whose wood was worked into rafts used for downriver trade as far as Tongguan at the southeast end of the Ordos Loop. Hekou itself manufactured blocks of soda and, connected to caravan routes running east and west, carried on a sizable trade with the Mongols on the south side of the Yellow River. The caravans kept it well supplied, including with Russian goods, but its growth was curtailed by the proximity of the older caravan center at Hohhot.

Nonetheless, Hekou was visited by several European explorers on their way to Tibet, including Huc and Gabet (1844) and Rockhill (1891), and became well known in China and abroad as a dividing point for the Yellow River's central sections.

In 1938, during WWII, the Japanese-aligned Inner Mongolian Autonomous Government downgraded Hekou from town status to a village. (Because of its importance in relation to the Yellow River, however, it is still sometimes mistakenly referenced as a town in both Chinese and English sources.)

== Famous people ==
Hekou was the hometown of Li Yuzhi (李裕智, Lǐ Yùzhì), a Mongolian Communist martyred in 1927.
