= Hekou, Dongying =

Hekou District 河口区
- District
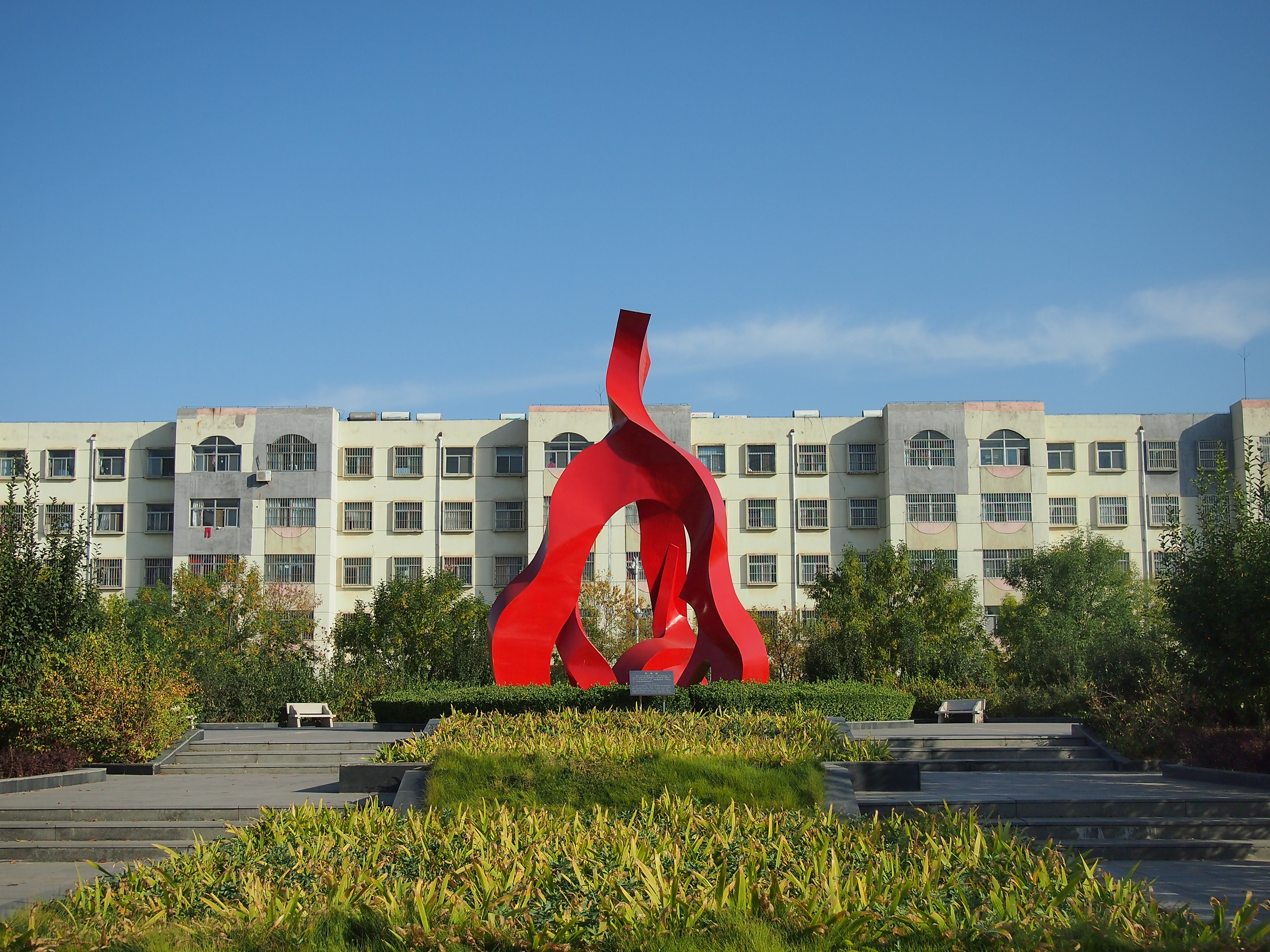
- Yellow River Square

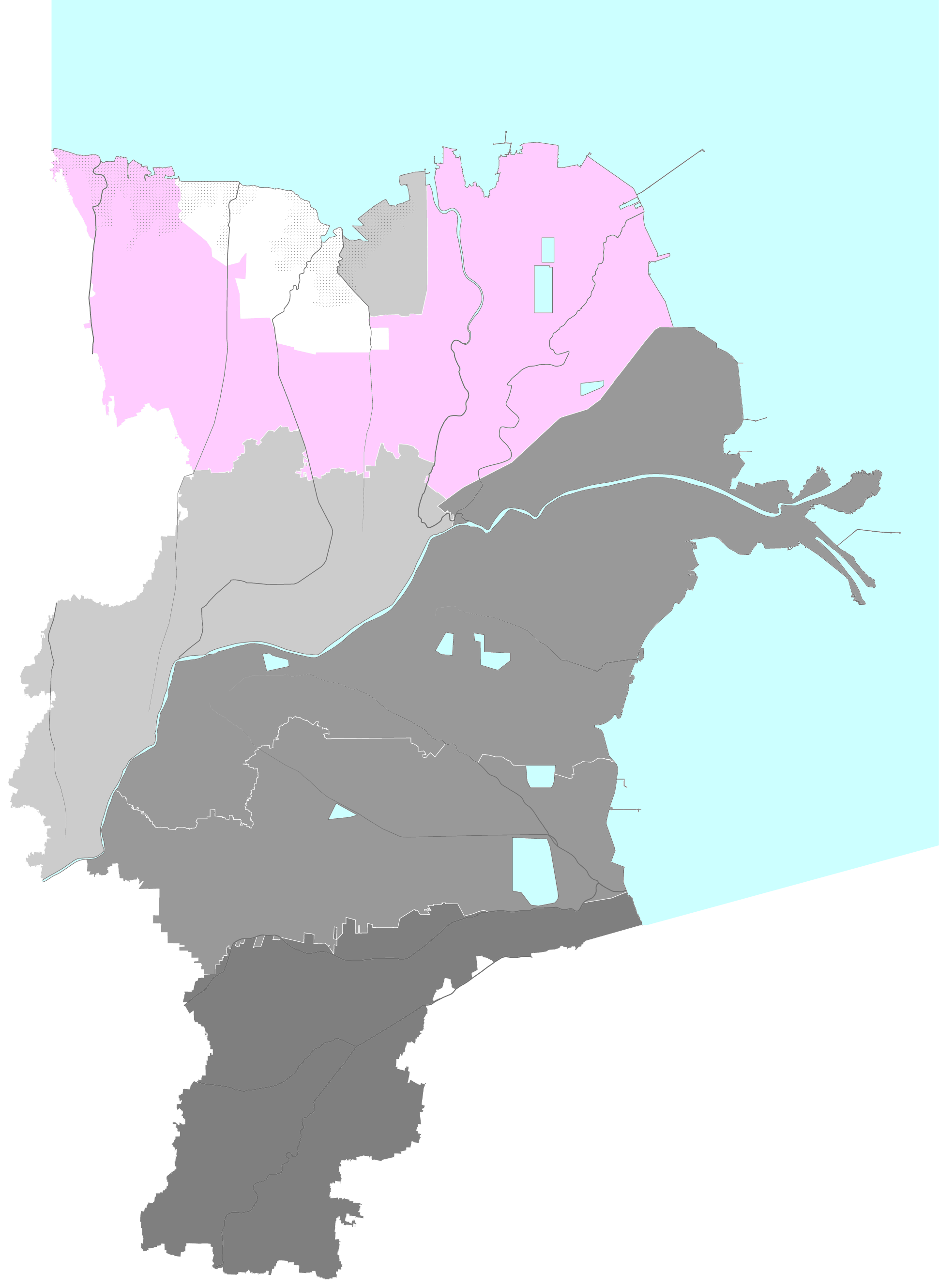
- Location in Dongying

- Location in Shandong
- Coordinates: 37°54′55″N 118°37′42″E
- Country: People's Republic of China
- Province: Shandong
- Prefecture-level city: Dongying

Area
  - Total: 2,267.44 km^{2} (875.46 sq mi)

Population (2017)
  - Total: 220,258
  - Density: 97.1395/km^{2} (251.590/sq mi)
- Time zone: UTC+8 (China Standard)
- Postal code: 257200
- Website: www.sdhekou.gov.cn

Hekou (Chinese: 河口; pinyin: Hékǒu; lit. 'river mouth') is a district of the city of Dongying, Shandong province, China. As of the census of 2010, there were 247,595 people, and 90,092 families residing in Hekou.

== Administrative divisions ==
As of 2012, this district is divided to 1 subdistrict, 3 towns and 3 townships.

Subdistricts

- Hekou Subdistrict (河口街道)

Towns

- Yihe (义和镇)
- Xianhe (仙河镇)
- Gudao (孤岛镇)

Townships

- Xinhu Township (新户乡)
- Taiping Township (太平乡)
- Liuhe Township (六合乡)

== Climate ==
Climate data for Hekou District (1991–2020 normals, extremes 1991–present)
Month	Jan	Feb	Mar	Apr	May	Jun	Jul	Aug	Sep	Oct	Nov	Dec	Year
Record high °C (°F)	16.5 (61.7)	21.6 (70.9)	29.4 (84.9)	33.7 (92.7)	38.2 (100.8)	40.1 (104.2)	39.7 (103.5)	38.8 (101.8)	36.1 (97.0)	30.0 (86.0)	24.2 (75.6)	15.4 (59.7)	40.1 (104.2)
Mean daily maximum °C (°F)	2.4 (36.3)	5.9 (42.6)	12.7 (54.9)	20.2 (68.4)	26.3 (79.3)	30.2 (86.4)	31.5 (88.7)	30.3 (86.5)	26.7 (80.1)	20.3 (68.5)	11.8 (53.2)	4.5 (40.1)	18.6 (65.4)
Daily mean °C (°F)	−2.3 (27.9)	0.7 (33.3)	6.9 (44.4)	14.2 (57.6)	20.6 (69.1)	24.9 (76.8)	27.2 (81.0)	26.3 (79.3)	22.0 (71.6)	15.1 (59.2)	6.9 (44.4)	−0.1 (31.8)	13.5 (56.4)
Mean daily minimum °C (°F)	−5.8 (21.6)	−3.0 (26.6)	2.5 (36.5)	9.2 (48.6)	15.5 (59.9)	20.3 (68.5)	23.6 (74.5)	23.0 (73.4)	18.0 (64.4)	10.9 (51.6)	3.1 (37.6)	−3.4 (25.9)	9.5 (49.1)
Record low °C (°F)	−16.8 (1.8)	−15.1 (4.8)	−7.1 (19.2)	−1.5 (29.3)	7.1 (44.8)	10.4 (50.7)	17.5 (63.5)	14.7 (58.5)	7.4 (45.3)	−1.3 (29.7)	−8.8 (16.2)	−15.7 (3.7)	−16.8 (1.8)
Average precipitation mm (inches)	5.0 (0.20)	9.1 (0.36)	7.5 (0.30)	21.8 (0.86)	48.0 (1.89)	72.6 (2.86)	157.9 (6.22)	179.1 (7.05)	32.9 (1.30)	27.3 (1.07)	20.6 (0.81)	5.8 (0.23)	587.6 (23.15)
Average precipitation days (≥ 0.1 mm)	2.4	3.1	2.8	4.8	6.4	8.0	11.1	10.4	5.7	4.9	4.2	2.6	66.4
Average snowy days	3.5	2.9	0.9	0.1	0	0	0	0	0	0	1.0	2.3	10.7
Average relative humidity (%)	62	58	52	52	55	62	73	75	68	64	64	63	62
Mean monthly sunshine hours	184.8	185.1	237.7	251.9	280.6	254.9	218.2	219.4	222.3	211.3	176.3	177.6	2,620.1
Percentage possible sunshine	60	60	64	64	64	58	49	53	60	62	59	60	59
Source: China Meteorological Administrationall-time August high
