= Baisha, Jiangjin District =

Baisha 白沙镇
- Town
- Location in Chongqing
- Coordinates: 29°3′43″N 106°7′14″E
- Country: People's Republic of China
- Direct-administered municipality: Chongqing
- District: Jiangjin District
- Time zone: UTC+8 (China Standard)

Baisha (Chinese: 白沙) is a town of Jiangjin District, Chongqing, China. As of 2018, it has 10 residential communities and 14 villages under its administration.

== See also ==
- List of township-level divisions of Chongqing
