= Du'an Yao Autonomous County =

Du'an County 都安县 · Duh'anh Yen
- County
- 都安瑶族自治县 · Duh'anh Yauzcuz Swciyen; Du'an Yao Autonomous County
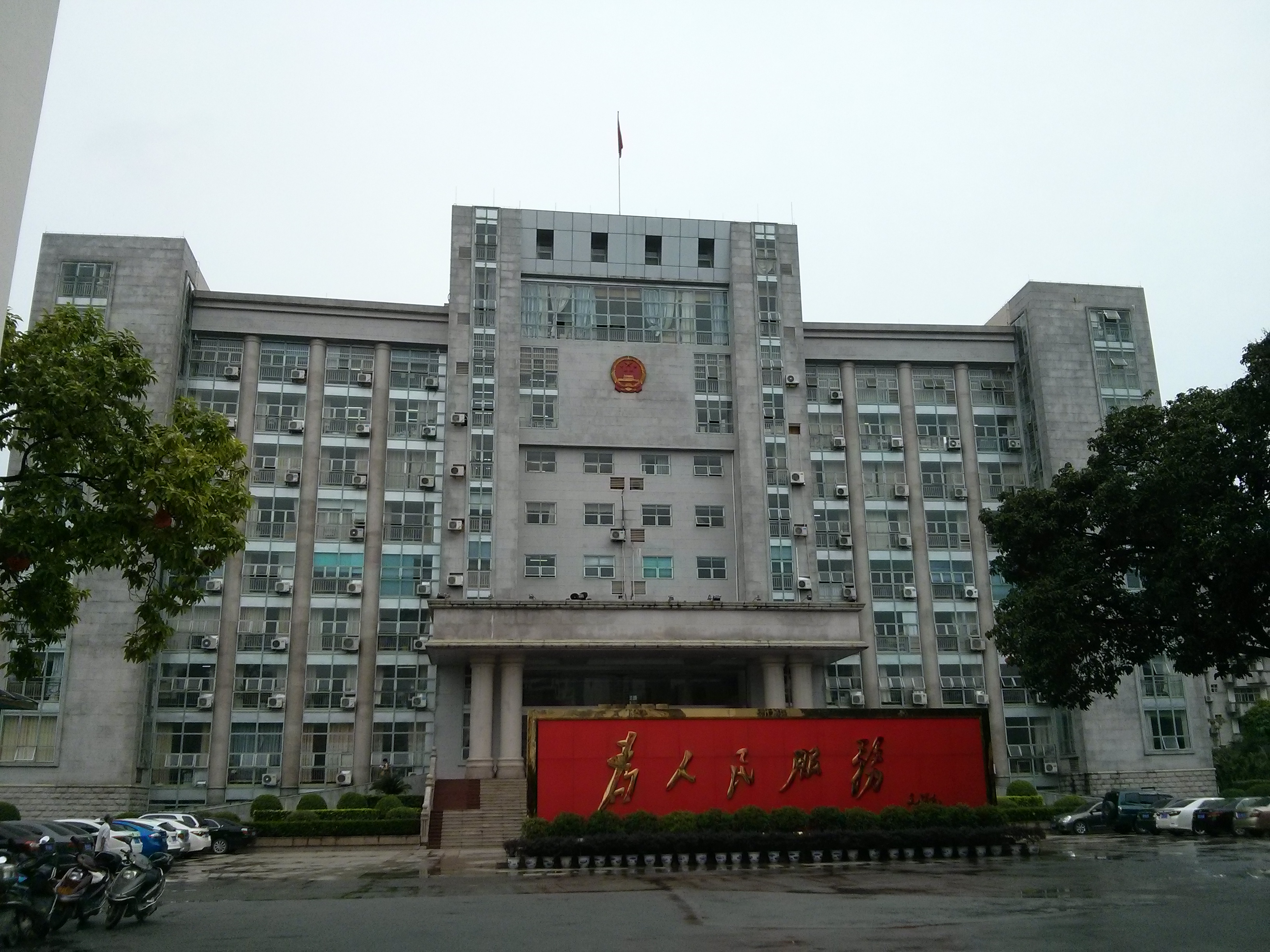

- Location of the seat in Guangxi
- Coordinates: 23°56′N 108°06′E
- Country: China
- Region: Guangxi
- Prefecture-level city: Hechi
- Township-level divisions: 2 towns 17 townships
- County seat: Anyang (安阳镇)

Area
  - Total: 4,092 km^{2} (1,580 sq mi)
- Elevation: 160 m (520 ft)

Population (2020)
  - Total: 538,061
  - Density: 131.5/km^{2} (340.6/sq mi)
- Time zone: UTC+8 (China Standard)
- Postal code: 530700
- Area code: 0778

Du'an Yao Autonomous County (Zhuang: Duhnganh Yauzcuz Swci Yen, simplified Chinese: 都安瑶族自治县; traditional Chinese: 都安瑤族自治縣; pinyin: Dū'ān Yáozú Zìzhìxiàn) is an autonomous county under the administration of Hechi City, in the northwest of Guangxi, China. It has an area of 4,092 km^{2} (1,580 sq mi) and a population of 625,100, including 596,100 that are of minority ethnic groups.

== Administrative divisions ==
There are ten towns and nine townships in the county:

Towns

Anyang (安阳镇), Gaoling (高岭镇), Disu (地苏镇), Xia'ao (下坳镇), Lalie (拉烈镇), Baiwang (百旺镇), Chengjiang (澄江镇), Daxing (大兴镇), Laren (拉仁镇), Yong'an (永安镇), Dongmiao (东庙镇), Longfu (隆福镇)

Townships

Bao'an Township (保安乡), Banling Township (板岭乡), Sanzhiyang Township (三只羊乡), Longwan Township (龙湾乡), Jingsheng Township (菁盛乡), Jiagui Township (加贵乡), Jiudu Township (九渡乡)

== Transportation ==
- China National Highway 210

== Climate ==
Climate data for Du'an, elevation 171 m (561 ft), (1991–2020 normals, extremes 1981–2010)
Month	Jan	Feb	Mar	Apr	May	Jun	Jul	Aug	Sep	Oct	Nov	Dec	Year
Record high °C (°F)	27.9 (82.2)	32.9 (91.2)	35.3 (95.5)	36.5 (97.7)	36.9 (98.4)	38.0 (100.4)	39.0 (102.2)	39.6 (103.3)	38.4 (101.1)	35.7 (96.3)	32.1 (89.8)	29.1 (84.4)	39.6 (103.3)
Mean daily maximum °C (°F)	15.5 (59.9)	17.7 (63.9)	20.6 (69.1)	26.1 (79.0)	29.8 (85.6)	31.6 (88.9)	32.7 (90.9)	33.1 (91.6)	31.7 (89.1)	28.0 (82.4)	23.7 (74.7)	18.4 (65.1)	25.7 (78.4)
Daily mean °C (°F)	12.3 (54.1)	14.3 (57.7)	17.2 (63.0)	22.2 (72.0)	25.6 (78.1)	27.4 (81.3)	28.3 (82.9)	28.4 (83.1)	26.9 (80.4)	23.5 (74.3)	19.2 (66.6)	14.4 (57.9)	21.6 (71.0)
Mean daily minimum °C (°F)	10.1 (50.2)	12.0 (53.6)	14.8 (58.6)	19.4 (66.9)	22.6 (72.7)	24.7 (76.5)	25.4 (77.7)	25.3 (77.5)	23.7 (74.7)	20.3 (68.5)	16.2 (61.2)	11.7 (53.1)	18.8 (65.9)
Record low °C (°F)	0.5 (32.9)	1.4 (34.5)	1.3 (34.3)	8.7 (47.7)	13.7 (56.7)	18.4 (65.1)	20.8 (69.4)	20.1 (68.2)	15.4 (59.7)	10.9 (51.6)	5.4 (41.7)	0.9 (33.6)	0.5 (32.9)
Average precipitation mm (inches)	58.1 (2.29)	41.0 (1.61)	79.1 (3.11)	102.9 (4.05)	244.2 (9.61)	403.0 (15.87)	333.5 (13.13)	219.9 (8.66)	113.7 (4.48)	76.5 (3.01)	60.1 (2.37)	44.3 (1.74)	1,776.3 (69.93)
Average precipitation days (≥ 0.1 mm)	11.9	11.1	16.2	14.8	16.0	19.6	18.5	15.6	10.0	8.1	8.8	8.6	159.2
Average snowy days	0.2	0	0	0	0	0	0	0	0	0	0	0.1	0.3
Average relative humidity (%)	74	75	79	78	78	82	80	79	74	70	70	68	76
Mean monthly sunshine hours	55.8	48.8	47.7	80.6	126.3	125.7	163.1	190.1	183.6	158.7	127.3	106.7	1,414.4
Percentage possible sunshine	17	15	13	21	31	31	39	48	50	45	39	32	32
Source: China Meteorological Administration
