= Chang Prefecture =

Chang Prefecture may refer to:

- Cháng Prefecture (常州), a prefecture between the 6th and 13th centuries in modern Jiangsu, China
- Chāng Prefecture (昌州), a prefecture between the 8th and 13th centuries in modern Chongqing, China
- Zhang Prefecture (漳州), a prefecture in modern Fujian, China, romanized as Chang Prefecture in the Wade–Giles system

== See also ==
- Changzhou (disambiguation)
- Chang (disambiguation)
