= Chenjiaping Bus Station =

Bus station in Chongqing, China

Coordinates: 29°31′31.4″N 106°29′12.9″E

Chenjiaping Bus Station (simplified Chinese: 陈家坪汽车站; traditional Chinese: 陳家坪汽車站; pinyin: Chénjiāpíng Qìchē Zhàn) is a bus station located in Shapingba District, Chongqing, China, and is located near the eastern terminus of the Chengyu Expressway, running from Chongqing to Chengdu.

Routes run to Chengdu, Jianyang, Neijiang, Longchang, Luzhou, Suining, Yibin, Zigong, and Ziyang, all of which are in Sichuan province. Within the Chongqing municipality, the station is connected directly to Jiangjin, Yongchuan, Bishan, Dazu, Rongchang, Tongliang and Tongnan Districts.
