= When Motherland Calls Upon Us =

People's Liberation Army song

"When the Motherland Calls Upon Us" (simplified Chinese: 当祖国召唤的时候; traditional Chinese: 當祖國召喚的時候; pinyin: Dāng zǔguó zhàohuàn de shíhòu) is a Chinese patriotic song and march used extensively by the People's Liberation Army. It was written by Hu Hongwei, the Deputy Commander of Shenyang Song District Marching Song and Dance Ensemble, to music by Placido Domingo. The song praises the bravery and initiative of the People's Liberation Army, and pays particular homage to Dong Cunrui and Huang Jiguang, two celebrated Chinese war heroes.

== Lyrics ==
Simplified Chinese	Pinyin	English Translation
当祖国召唤的时候 挺起胸膛站排头 我就是董存瑞 我就是黄继光 奋勇争当突击手 把光荣写在军旗上 战火青春最风流 英雄的战友们 前进吧 为祖国去战斗 为祖国去战斗 为祖国去战斗 重复两次	dāng zǔ guó zhào huàn dí shí hòu tǐng qǐ xiōng táng zhàn pái tóu wǒ jiù shì dǒng cún ruì wǒ jiù shì huáng jì guāng fèn yǒng zhēng dāng tū jī shǒu bǎ guāng róng xiě zài jūn qí shàng zhàn huǒ qīng chūn zuì fēng liú yīng xióng dí zhàn yǒu mén qián jìn bā wéi zǔ guó qù zhàn dǒu wéi zǔ guó qù zhàn dǒu wéi zǔ guó qù zhàn dǒu Chóngfù liǎng cì	When the Motherland calls upon us Bravery stands forward I am Dong Cunrui; I am Huang Jiguang; Be the first one to the front! Our glory shines on our banner Our youth is the romance of war Comrades! Forward! Fight for our Motherland! Fight for our Motherland! Fight for our Motherland! Repeat twice

== See also ==
- Dong Fang Hong I
- The East Is Red (1965 film)
- Honglaowai
- Maoism
- "Ode to the Motherland"
- "Sailing the Seas Depends on the Helmsman"
- "Without the Communist Party, There Would Be No New China"
