= Bishan, Chongqing =

Bishan 璧山区
- District
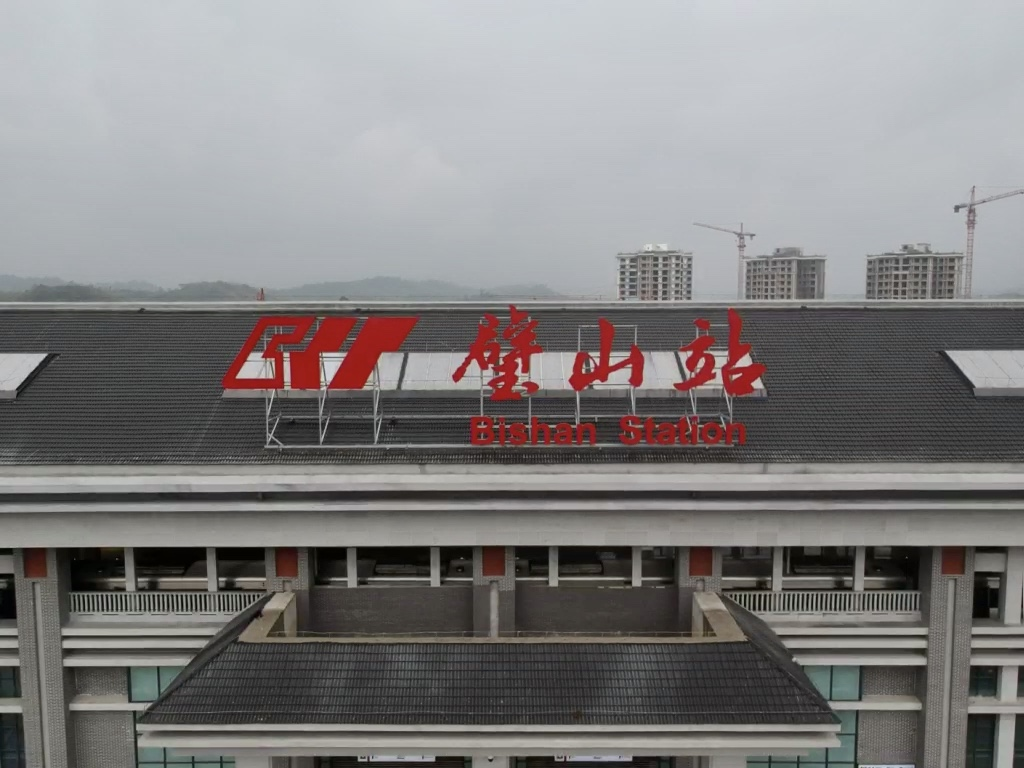
- Bishan Station
- Interactive map of Bishan
- Coordinates: 29°36′N 106°13′E
- Country: People's Republic of China
- Municipality: Chongqing

Area
  - Total: 912 km^{2} (352 sq mi)

Population (2020)
  - Total: 756,022
  - Density: 829/km^{2} (2,150/sq mi)
- Time zone: UTC+8 (China Standard)
- Area code: 023

Bishan (Chinese: 璧山区; pinyin: Bìshān Qū) is one of the districts of Chongqing, China, with a history of over 2000 years. Bishan is 23 kilometers (14 mi) west of Chenjiaping in downtown Chongqing. Formerly a county, it became a district on 6 June 2014.

== Administrative divisions ==
Bishan administers 6 subdistricts and 9 towns, with a total area of 915 square kilometers.

Name	Chinese (S)	Hanyu Pinyin	Population (2010)	Area (km^{2})
Bicheng Subdistrict	璧城街道	Bìchéng Jiēdào	204702	43
Biquan Subdistrict	璧泉街道	Bìquán Jiēdào	204702	43
Qinggang Subdistrict	青杠街道	Qītáng Jiēdào	204702	43
Laifeng Subdistrict	来凤街道	Láifèng Jiēdào	78582	44.48
Dingjia Subdistrict	丁家街道	Dīngjiā Jiēdào	60585	85.12
Dalu Subdistrict	大路街道	Dàlù Jiēdào	48145	115.5
Batang town	八塘镇	Bātáng Zhèn	23851	65.26
Qitang town	七塘镇	Qītáng Zhèn	21185	57
Hebian town	河边镇	Hébiān Zhèn	20037	52.5
Fulu town	福禄镇	Fúlù Zhèn	13586	40.6
Daxing town	大兴镇	Dàxīng Zhèn	40068	100.14
Zhengxing town	正兴镇	Zhèngxìng Zhèn	27804	75.02
Guangpu town	广普镇	Guǎngpǔ Zhèn	18002	47.15
Sanhe town	三合镇	Sānhé Zhèn	11336	35.98
Jianlong town	健龙镇	Jiànlóng Zhèn	18151	27.7

== History ==
Bishan has a recorded history of over 2000 years.

- In 316 BC, Jiangzhou County (江州县) was established here by the State of Qin.
- In 757, Bishan County was established and administered by Yuzhou.
- In 1102, Bishan was administered by Gongzhou, which is renamed from Yuzhou.
- In 1189, Gongzhou was promoted to Chongqing Fu, which still administered Bishan County.
- In 1259, Bishan County was merged into Ba County.
- In 1483, Bishan County was re-established.
- In 1662, Bishan County was merged into Yongchuan County.
- In 1729, Bishan County was re-established again.
- In 1914, Bishan County was administered by Sichuan province.
- In 1997, Bishan County became part of the newly established Chongqing Municipality.
- In 2014, Bishan County became Bishan District of Chongqing.

== Geographic condition ==
Bishan is located in 106°02′E−106°20′E of longitude and 29°17′N−29°53′N of latitude. It is in border with Shapingba District and Jiulongpo District in east, with Jiangjin District of Chongqing in south, with Tongliang County and Yongchuan District of Chongqing in west, with Hechuan District and Beibei District of Chongqing in north.

== Climate ==
Its climate belongs to subtropic monsoon weather style, with an annual average temperature of 18.0°C, annual total rainfall of 1231.2mm and frost-free period of 337 days. On 20 August 2022, a maximum temperature of 43.8 °C (110.8 °F) was registered in Bishan District.

Climate data for Bishan, elevation 332 m (1,089 ft), (1991–2020 normals, extremes 1981–present)
Month	Jan	Feb	Mar	Apr	May	Jun	Jul	Aug	Sep	Oct	Nov	Dec	Year
Record high °C (°F)	17.6 (63.7)	24.0 (75.2)	34.5 (94.1)	35.7 (96.3)	37.2 (99.0)	38.0 (100.4)	41.5 (106.7)	43.8 (110.8)	41.8 (107.2)	35.1 (95.2)	29.0 (84.2)	19.2 (66.6)	43.8 (110.8)
Mean daily maximum °C (°F)	10.2 (50.4)	13.3 (55.9)	18.2 (64.8)	23.6 (74.5)	26.9 (80.4)	29.2 (84.6)	33.0 (91.4)	33.3 (91.9)	28.0 (82.4)	21.7 (71.1)	17.1 (62.8)	11.4 (52.5)	22.2 (71.9)
Daily mean °C (°F)	7.6 (45.7)	10.0 (50.0)	14.2 (57.6)	19.0 (66.2)	22.4 (72.3)	24.9 (76.8)	28.3 (82.9)	28.3 (82.9)	23.9 (75.0)	18.5 (65.3)	14.0 (57.2)	9.0 (48.2)	18.3 (65.0)
Mean daily minimum °C (°F)	5.8 (42.4)	7.8 (46.0)	11.3 (52.3)	15.7 (60.3)	19.1 (66.4)	22.0 (71.6)	24.9 (76.8)	24.7 (76.5)	21.1 (70.0)	16.4 (61.5)	12.0 (53.6)	7.3 (45.1)	15.7 (60.2)
Record low °C (°F)	−1.7 (28.9)	0.6 (33.1)	−0.1 (31.8)	6.2 (43.2)	9.7 (49.5)	15.0 (59.0)	18.2 (64.8)	18.6 (65.5)	13.6 (56.5)	6.7 (44.1)	3.7 (38.7)	−1.5 (29.3)	−1.7 (28.9)
Average precipitation mm (inches)	16.5 (0.65)	20.2 (0.80)	50.1 (1.97)	97.8 (3.85)	135.7 (5.34)	196.2 (7.72)	176.5 (6.95)	139.1 (5.48)	125.5 (4.94)	90.8 (3.57)	47.0 (1.85)	21.1 (0.83)	1,116.5 (43.95)
Average precipitation days (≥ 0.1 mm)	10.0	8.7	11.4	14.0	15.9	16.5	12.6	11.8	13.6	17.0	11.6	10.9	154
Average snowy days	0.4	0.2	0	0	0	0	0	0	0	0	0	0.1	0.7
Average relative humidity (%)	82	78	75	75	75	80	75	72	78	84	83	84	78
Mean monthly sunshine hours	25.4	37.3	77.4	106.8	108.9	96.9	165.4	173.7	102.8	52.2	44.1	23.3	1,014.2
Percentage possible sunshine	8	12	21	27	26	23	39	43	28	15	14	7	22
Source: China Meteorological Administrationall-time extreme temperatureall-time July high

== Transportation ==
=== Bus ===
Bus service is available via the Chengyu Expressway from Chenjiaping Bus Station of within Chongqing's city proper, some 23 km (14 mi) away.

=== Metro ===
The Bishan metro station of Line 1 (Chongqing Rail Transit) opened on December 30, 2019. The Bishan rubber-tyred tram runs between the Bishan metro station and Bishan high-speed rail station.

=== Railway ===
Construction of the Bishan Railway Station began in 2012 and was completed in December 2014. The station was opened on December 26, 2015. It is on the route of the Chengdu–Chongqing Intercity Railway, which opened for passenger service in June 2015. The railway station acts as a central travel hub for the Bishan area. After the completion of the high-speed rail line, Bishan was further integrated into the urban area of Chongqing, as travel time to Chongqing city proper was reduced to a mere 15 minutes.
