= 長州 =

長州 may refer to:

- Chang Prefecture (Inner Mongolia) (長州), a prefecture between the 7th and 8th centuries in modern Inner Mongolia
- Trường Province (Vietnam) (長州), a province between the 8th and 9th centuries in modern Vietnam
- Chōshū Domain, a feudal domain of Japan during the Edo period
- Nagato Province, abbreviated name was Chōshū (長州), province of Japan located in what is today Yamaguchi Prefecture

== See also ==
- 長洲, similar characters referring to various places called Changzhou
