= Jiguang =

Jiguang is a surname. Notable people with this surname include:

- Huang Jiguang (1931–1952), Chinese soldier
- Long Jiguang (1867–1925), Chinese general
- Qi Jiguang (1528–1588), Chinese military general and writer
