= 常州 (disambiguation) =

Changzhou (常州) is a prefecture-level city in Jiangsu, China.

常州 may also refer to:

- Cháng Prefecture (常州), prefecture between the 6th and 13th centuries in modern Jiangsu, China
- Hitachi Province, abbreviated name was Jōshū (常州), province of Japan located in what is today Ibaraki Prefecture
