= Verin Hand =

- Location within Armenia Location within Syunik Province
- Coordinates: 39°09′12″N 46°10′56″E
- Country: Armenia
- Province: Syunik
- Municipality: Kapan
- Time zone: UTC+4
  - Summer (DST): UTC+5

Verin Hand is a village in the Syunik Province of Armenia. Currently, the village is administratively subordinate to the Kapan enlarged community. In Soviet times, the village was part of the Tsav village council.
