= Qiu Shaoyun =

Chinese war hero of the Korean War (1926–1952)

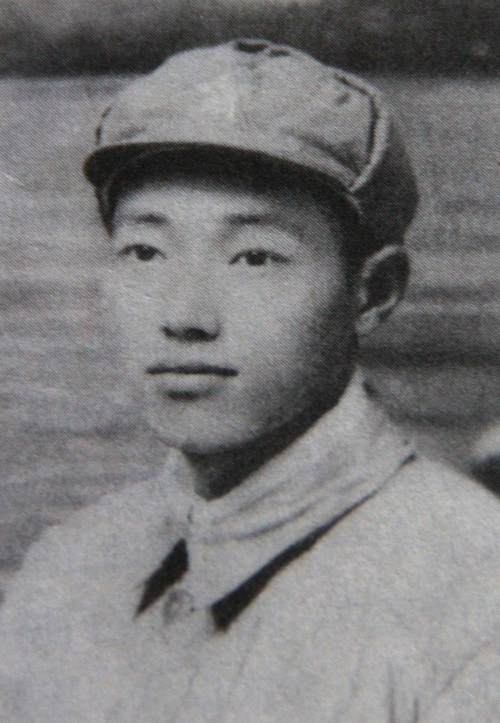
- Qiu Shaoyun in April 1951, after the Battle of Luojiashan
- Native name: 邱少云
- Born: 1 June 1926; Qiujiagou, Guanjian township, Tongliang County, Sichuan, China
- Died: 12 October 1952 (aged 26) Ch'ŏrwŏn County, North Korea

Qiu Shaoyun (Chinese: 邱少云; pinyin: Qiū Shàoyún; 1 June 1926 – 12 October 1952) was a Chinese soldier, who is regarded as a war hero by China and North Korea for his actions during the Korean War.

== Early life ==
Chinese military records say Qiu was born in 1931 in Tongliang County, Sichuan Province. He joined the People's Liberation Army in December 1949 and in March 1951, joined the People's Volunteer Army to fight in the Korean War.

== Death ==
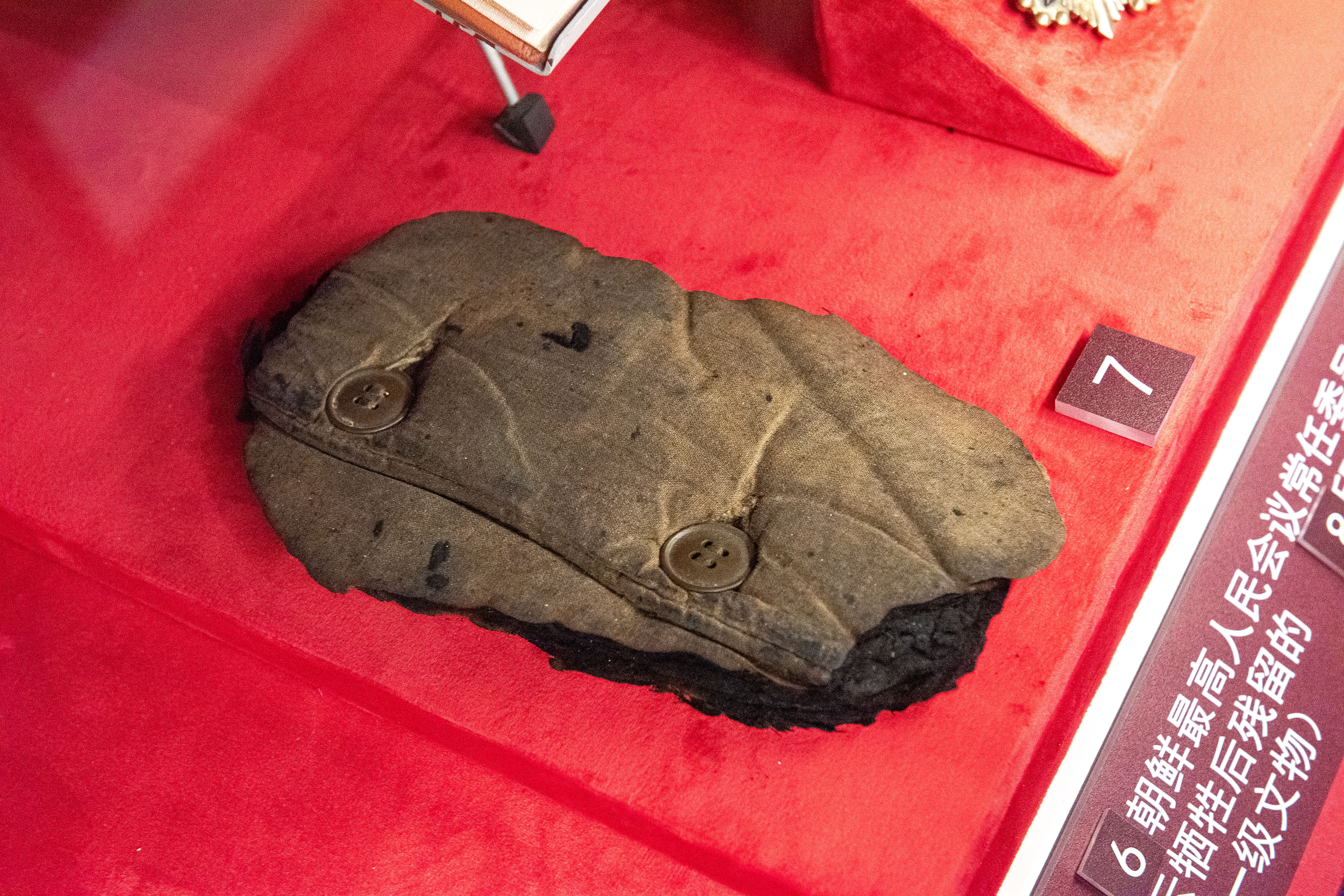
Relics of Qiu's clothing

The official Chinese government narrative says in October 1952, Qiu was a member of a unit that tried to ambush United Nations Command positions which occupied No. 391 highland. At around on the 12, incendiary bombs were fired by UN forces, one of which landed near Qiu's position. Instead of trying to extinguish the flames, Qiu immolated himself so that the rest of unit could remain hidden.

== Awards ==
Qiu Shaoyun was posthumously awarded membership in the Chinese Communist Party, a Special-Class Merit citation and the title of "First-Class Hero of the Chinese People's Volunteers Army". In North Korea, the Standing Committee of the Supreme People's Assembly of the Democratic People's Republic of Korea posthumously awarded him the title of "Hero of the Democratic People's Republic of Korea", the Gold-Star Medal, and the First-Class Medal of National Flag.

== Legacy ==
The Qiu Shaoyun Martyrs Memorial Hall was built in 1959 and opened on 12 October 1962 in Qiu's honor.

In 2016, a court in Beijing convicted a blogger, who ridiculed the official government narrative of Qiu's death through social media posts, of "undermining the public interest" and "causing Qiu's family psychological trauma". As punishment, the court ordered him to pay Qiu's brother 1 renminbi and issue public apologies for five consecutive days. Qiao Mu, a journalism professor at Beijing Foreign Studies University, said while the blogger used inappropriate words in his posts, the court ruling would limit freedom of historical inquiry.

== See also ==
- Dong Cunrui
- Hunan Avetisyan
- Huang Jiguang
