= Chongqing Bachuan International High School =

International school in Chongqing, China

Chongqing Bachuan International High School Chinese: 重庆市巴川国际高级中学校

Information
- Established: 2012; 13 years ago

Chongqing Bachuan International High School and Middle School (Chinese: 重庆市巴川国际高级中学校, romanized: Chóngqìng shì bāchuān guójì gāojí zhōngxuéxiào) or Chongqing Bachuan International Math & Science School is an international school in Tongliang District, Chongqing, China. The school shares its campus with Bachuan Middle School, Bachuan High School and the Bachuan Mini program. The international school opened in 2012.
