= Pingtan, Chongqing =

Pingtan 平滩镇
- Town
- Location in Chongqing
- Coordinates: 29°50′43″N 105°52′45″E
- Country: People's Republic of China
- Direct-administered municipality: Chongqing
- District: Tongliang District
- Time zone: UTC+8 (China Standard)

Pingtan (Chinese: 平滩; pinyin: Píngtān) is a town in Tongliang District, Chongqing, China. As of 2020, it administers Longtan Residential Community (龙潭社区) and the following 17 villages:

- Wanqiao Village (万桥村)
- Yanghai Village (洋海村)
- Huaguang Village (华光村)
- Xinhua Village (新华村)
- Chala Village (插腊村)
- Qinggang Village (青杠村)
- Zhuyu Village (珠玉村)
- Gaoping Village (高平村)
- Sifang Village (四方村)
- Tai'an Village (太安村)
- Honghe Village (红河村)
- Lideng Village (立灯村)
- Jinzhu Village (金竹村)
- Hongtai Village (洪太村)
- Yulong Village (玉龙村)
- Tuanbao Village (团宝村)
- Huifeng Village (惠风村)

== See also ==
- List of township-level divisions of Chongqing
