= Daxing, Chongqing =

Daxing 大兴镇
- Town
- Location in Chongqing
- Coordinates: 29°33′23″N 106°9′43″E
- Country: People's Republic of China
- Direct-administered municipality: Chongqing
- District: Bishan District
- Time zone: UTC+8 (China Standard)

Daxing (simplified Chinese: 大兴; traditional Chinese: 大興; pinyin: Dàxīng) is a town under the administration of Bishan District, Chongqing, China. As of 2018, it has 2 residential communities and 17 villages under its administration.

== See also ==
- List of township-level divisions of Chongqing
