= 89th Rifle Division =

89th Rifle Division-Tamanskaya Division
- Active: December 1941 – 1956
- Country: Soviet Union
- Branch: Red Army
- Type: Rifle Division
- Size: ca. 5-7,000 men 50-100 guns and mortars
- Nickname: Taman
- Engagements: Battle of the Caucasus; Battle of the Crimea (1944); Battle of the Baltic (1944); Vistula-Oder Offensive; Battle of Berlin
- Decorations: Order of Kutuzov 2nd Class, Order of the Red Banner, Order of the Red Star
- Battle honours: Taman

Commanders
- Notable commanders: Nver Safarian

The 89th Taman Red Banner Orders of Kutuzov and the Red Star Rifle Division (Russian: 89-я стрелковая Таманская Краснознамённая орденов Кутузова и Красной Звезды дивизия; Armenian: 89-րդ հրաձգային Թամանյան կարմրադրոշ, Կուտուզովի և Կարմիր Աստղի շքանշանակիր դիվիզիա), or the Tamanyan Division, was a distinguished division in the Soviet Red Army during the Second World War. The division was mainly remembered for its second formation, this time as an Armenian National Division, where it advanced from the North Caucasus front to Crimea until the autumn of 1944, when it was redeployed to Poland to engage in the final offensive into the capital of Germany. The unit saw post-war service as the 7th Guards Army of the Transcaucasian Military District.

== First Formation ==
The division was established at Kursk prior to June 1941. On 22 June 1941 it was part of 30th Rifle Corps in the interior Orel Military District. Fighting as part of the 19th Army, it was wiped out at Vyazma in October 1941.

== Second Formation ==
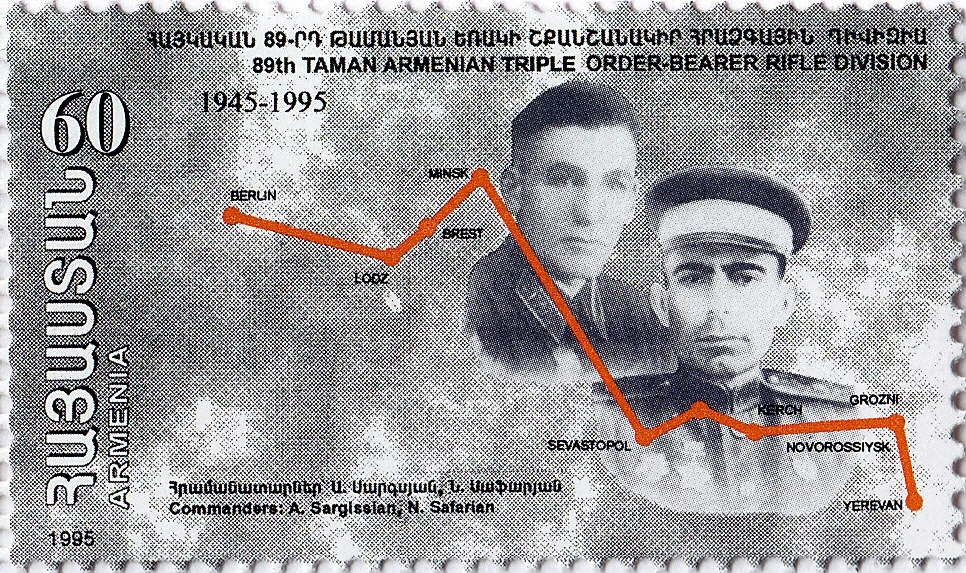
Commanders Andranik Sargsian and Nver Safarian 89th Taman Triple Order bearer rifle division. Series "50th Anniversary of Victory in Second World War". Stamp of Armenia, 1995.

The division was re-formed in December 1941 in the capital of the Armenian SSR, Yerevan, following the German invasion of the Soviet Union. It was a redesignation of the 474th Rifle Division, which was formed on 14 December 1941 and renumbered the 89th Rifle Division on 26 December 1941. Over the course of the war period, the division had a number of commanders, including Colonel Simeon G. Zakian (who was killed in action in April 1942 during military operations in the Kerch Peninsula), Lieutenant-Colonel Andranik Sargsian, Colonel Artashes Vasilian, and finally Colonel Nver G. Safarian, who took over command in February 1943 and would eventually attain the rank of major general. It published its own weekly Armenian-language newspaper called the Karmir Zinvor (Red Soldier).

=== The Caucasus and the Crimea ===
In August 1942, the 89th Division was dispatched toward the North Caucasus Front, where it took up defensive positions to block the German drive toward Grozny. From November to December 1942, the unit took part in several fierce battles in the area around the cities of Elekhotvo, Malgobek, and Voznesenskaya and helped bring the German penetration into the Caucasus to a halt. As the Soviet armies shifted to the offensive during the winter of 1942-43, the 89th Division began its gradual advance toward the Crimea. On January 21, 1943, along with other Soviet forces from the Transcaucasian Front, it participated in the capture of Malgobek, Khamedan and a number of other settlements previously held by the Germans. The unit's advance picked up pace in the following month, averaging about 30-40 kilometers a day as it approached the Sea of Azov.

The Germans put up a stiff resistance in the Crimea, and in the fighting around the settlement of Novo Jerilka division commander Colonel Vasilian was killed. The 89th itself suffered heavy casualties but in the following months fresh recruits from Armenia brought it back to full strength, and Vasilian's successor and the division commander was the able Colonel Nver Safarian. In September 1943, the division was redeployed and ordered to attack the Axis defensive fortifications on the Taman Peninsula. On September 6, it moved in a northeasterly direction from Novorossiysk and engaged in heavy fighting for several days until the Axis defenses were overwhelmed and the villages of Verkhnebakansk and Taman were liberated on September 18 and October 3, respectively. The 89th distinguished itself in these two battles and was given the honorary title of "Tamanskaia" (Таманская; Tamanyan, Թամանյան)." Two soldiers from the division in particular, Senior Sergeants Hunan M. Avetisian and Suren S. Arakelian, were noted for the courage they displayed during the fighting and were both posthumously awarded with the medal of the Hero of the Soviet Union.

On November 21, the 89th Division participated in the Kerch–Eltigen Operation, an ambitious Soviet military operation involving the landing of amphibious troops onto the Kerch Peninsula. The unit landed near the settlements of Baksi and Adzhimushkay, not far from the Strait of Kerch, and held its position for five months despite withering Axis fire. Beginning in January 1944, it slowly made headway toward Kerch and dislodged the defending Axis troops from one portion of the city. Members of the division distinguished themselves once more, the most prominent of them being field-engineer Jahan S. Karakhanian, who was killed in December 1943 while trying to establish a new observation post and was posthumously awarded with the medal of the Hero of the Soviet Union. In recognition of its efforts, on 24 April 1944 the division was awarded with the Order of the Red Star.

In May 1944, the Soviet army began its offensive to retake Sevastopol. The 89th Division was given the objective of capturing the Gornaia Height, which would then open the way to Sevastopol. This was accomplished and the unit subsequently took part in Sevastopol's and the promontory of Kherson's recapture. For the liberation of the Sevastopol the division was bestowed with the Order of the Red Banner. Senior lieutenants Simeon K. Baghdasarian and Khoren A. Khachaturian, and senior sergeants Aydin Gh. Harutyunian, Harutyun R. Mkrtchian and Vardges A. Rostomian were awarded with the Order of the Hero of Soviet Union.

=== Poland and Germany ===
In October–September 1944, the division was transferred first to Brest and then deployed along the defensive line near Lublin. With the commencement of the Vistula–Oder Offensive on January 12, 1945, the 89th Division took part in the general advance into Poland and aided in the liberation of dozens of Polish settlements and towns. By February, it had crossed the Oder River and had taken control of the approach leading to Frankfurt an der Oder and prevented the Germans from breaking through to endanger the Soviet forces now converging onto Berlin. By now, the unit was formally referred, in a mixed Russo-Armenian phrase, to as the "Little Armenian Land" (Haykakan Malaia Zemlia). With these routes secure, the Soviets now prepared for the capture of Berlin. The 89th Division entered Frankfurt an der Oder on April 16 and was then integrated into the command of the 3rd Shock Army, part of Marshal Zhukov's 1st Belorussian Front. Unit veteran Arshavir Hakobian writes that many of the Armenians of the division expressed a particular eagerness to take part in Berlin's capture on account of Imperial Germany's role as an ally of the Ottoman Empire during the 1915 Armenian genocide.

The 89th arrived in the German capital on the night of April 29, along with other elements of the 3rd Shock Army, and deployed the 390th, 400th, and 526th regiments to take part in heavy street-to-street battles in the Wedding and Reinickendorf districts. The division's artillery was put to good effect to level buildings where lurking panzerfaust teams were holding up the unit's advance into the central part of the city. On April 30 the division had encountered the twin four-storey structures at Flakturm III at Humboldthain Park. Safarian ordered that they be encircled, and brought his artillery to bear against the flak towers and had his sappers lay a thousand kilograms of explosives at the foundations. Though they caused a great number of casualties, including inflicting concussions against the defenders within, they were unable to penetrate the four meters of iron and concrete walls. But under withering artillery and anti-tank gun fire, on May 2 the commander of the flak towers agreed to surrender.

In several days of fighting the division had overrun seven districts. For its role in the capture of Berlin, the 89th was awarded with the Order of Kutuzov 2nd Class and Major General Hmayak G. Babaian was bestowed with the Hero of the Soviet Union. The 89th Rifle Division is recorded to have liberated a total of 900 cities, towns, and villages. It had advanced a distance of 3,700 kilometers in its combat history, and 7,333 of its members were given commendations and awards, nine of whom were decorated with the award of the Hero of the Soviet Union. A "friendship monument" and memorial was erected in the division's honor in Sevastopol.

On the morning of May 3, the 89th was dispatched westward and four days later arrived on the east bank of the Elbe River, near Wittenberg.

== Postwar ==
The division was slated for disbandment by the order that formed the Group of Soviet Occupation Forces in Germany on 29 May 1945, but this was countermanded. Instead, the 89th Rifle Division was withdrawn to Yerevan in 1946, becoming part of the 7th Guards Army of the Transcaucasian Military District. The division continued to be an Armenian national division until its disbandment on 7 July 1956 when the Soviet Army eliminated the national divisions.

== Division legacy ==
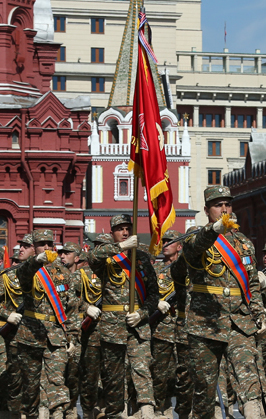
The Armenian contingent carrying the Flag of Armenia and the combat banner of the division on Red Square in 2015.

Honorifics included Tamanskaya Krasnozamennaya, of Order of Kutuzov and Order of the Red Star. In 1944, an obelisk was erected at the foot of the mountain at the mass grave of 250 soldiers of the division in the city of Balaklava. On the war's 75th anniversary in 2020, a memorial in the Bryukhovetsky District of the Krasnodar Territory was created. One of the streets of the district, Krasnodar Territory is named after the division.

The division also has a large legacy within Armenia. The 4th Independent Motor Rifle Regiment of the Armenian 5th Army Corps retains the battle flag and the traditions of the 89th Tamanyan Division of the Red Army. The battle flag of the regiment holds the Order of the Battle Cross of the 1st degree. The banner of the division was carried by the Armenian contingent at the 2015 and 2020 Moscow Victory Day Parade. On 18 July 2002, the Armenian Embassy in Tbilisi ceremonially awarded 8 Georgian veterans of the division with the Medal of Marshal Baghramyan.

== See also ==
- Sassuntsi-Davit Tank Regiment
- Soviet 76th "K. Y. Voroshilov" Division

== Bibliography ==
- Feskov, V.I.; Golikov, V.I.; Kalashnikov, K.A.; Slugin, S.A. (2013). Вооруженные силы СССР после Второй Мировой войны: от Красной Армии к Советской [The Armed Forces of the USSR after World War II: From the Red Army to the Soviet: Part 1 Land Forces] (in Russian). Tomsk: Scientific and Technical Literature Publishing. ISBN 9785895035306.
