= Changshou =

Changshou may refer to:

- Changshou District, Chongqing, China
- Changshou, Pingjiang (长寿镇), a town in Pingjiang County, Hunan, China
- Lake Changshou, Chongqing, China

== See also ==
- Changzhou (disambiguation)
