= Sanhe, Bishan District =

Sanhe 三合镇
- Town
- Location in Chongqing
- Coordinates: 29°20′54″N 106°06′03″E
- Country: People's Republic of China
- Municipality: Chongqing
- District: Bishan District
- Village-level divisions: 1 residential community 7 villages
- Elevation: 284 m (932 ft)
- Time zone: UTC+8 (China Standard)

Sanhe (Chinese: 三合; pinyin: Sānhé) is a town of southern Bishan District in western Chongqing Municipality, People's Republic of China, located 30 kilometres (19 mi) south-southwest of the county seat and about 51 km (32 mi) southwest of Chongqing's CBD as the crow flies. As of 2018, it has one residential community (社区) and seven villages under its administration.

== See also ==
- List of township-level divisions of Chongqing
