= Sassuntsi-Davit Tank Regiment =

Sasuntsi-Davit Tank Regiment
- The crews of the 119th Regiment, along with the attached mechanized infantry, seen standing in front of their T-34/85 tanks. The name of the regiment can be seen inscribed on the turret of the tanks in the Armenian script.
- Active: January, 1943–1945
- Country: Soviet Union
- Allegiance: Soviet Union
- Branch: Tank
- Type: Tank regiment
- Role: Tactical attack
- Size: ca. 5-7,000 men
- Garrison/HQ: Soviet Socialist Republic of Armenia
- Engagements: Belorussian Offensive, Battle of the Baltic (1944)
- Decorations: Order of the Red Banner (July 23, 1944), Red Army Guard (1945), Order of the Red Star

The 119th Separate Tank Regiment, popularly known as the Sasuntsi-Davit Tank Column (Armenian: «Սասունցի Դավիթ» տանկային շարասյուն; Танковая колонна «Давид Сасунский») was a decorated Soviet separate tank regiment during the Second World War, consisting primarily of ethnic Armenians. The unit was named after David of Sasun, the hero of the medieval Armenian national epic Daredevils of Sasun.

== Formation ==
The regiment was formed in Echmiatsin, Armenian SSR in January 1943 and was funded entirely through public subscription. Under the aegis of Archbishop Gevorg VI Chorekjian, diaspora Armenians communities in Cuba, Cyprus, Egypt, Ethiopia, Iran, Iraq, Transjordan, Lebanon, Syria, the United States, and elsewhere collectively raised US$115,000 in the United States; Can$37,000 in Canada; £L185,000 in Lebanon; £S 276,000 in Syria; £E 14,000 in Egypt; and Rls 2,500,000 in Iran. The Armenian Apostolic Church itself donated gifts in the area totaling around 850,000 Rbls and £1,000 stg. Various fund raising committees were established, the first founded on March 7, 1943 in New York City.

The funds were finally distributed under the auspices of the Armenian Apostolic Church residing in Echmiatsin, which were sufficient to outfit the regiment with 21 tanks by February 1944. The regiment was initially equipped with the newer generation T-34-85 tanks, armed with the new D-5T 85mm cannons. In February 1944, on the 119th Tank Regiment's turrets were inscribed with Armenian letters spelling out "Sasuntsi Davit" (Սասունցի Դավիթ).

== Combat history ==
On March 20, 1944, the 119th was attached to the Second Ukrainian Front and sent to Dniester. In early 1944, now also equipped with KV tanks, the regiment was assigned to the 27th Soviet Army to take part in the First Jassy–Kishinev Offensive and participated in the assaults to capture Pervomaysk and Iaşi (Romania).

The regiment was then sent north and incorporated into the First Baltic Front under the command of General Hovhannes Bagramyan. It was reinforced with an additional 22 T-34/85s and attached to the Soviet 6th Guards Tank Army. From July to August the unit fought against German forces in Operation Bagration, participating in the liberation of Vitebsk and Polatsk. Along with the Soviet 5th Guards Tank Army, the regiment broke through and overran fortified German positions.

On July 23, 1944, the unit was decorated with the Order of the Red Banner. Thereafter, it was sent to Panevėžys where it remained until the latter half of August. In 1945, the unit was reorganized and upgraded to the status of a Guards regiment and was rechristened the 135th Guards Tank Regiment.

== Commendation ==
Many of the Armenians were also decorated for their efforts during the war, including Sargis Nahapetian and Mikayel Stepanian, who both received the Order of the Red Star for their heroism in the battles. A similar effort to fund another Armenian tank unit, to be named after General Bagramyan, was proposed by the Armenian community in Tehran, Iran, although the war ended before such plans materialized.

== Gallery ==
Soviet nurse Zoya Grezlova tends to the aid of Lieutenant Stepanov, commander of Tank 40 (seen in the background) of the regiment in July 1944.

The tanks of the regiment lined up in a ceremonial procession column in June 1944. Tanks 4 and 6 in the column are identified with mine flail devices. The inscription on the turrets, written in Russian, read "David of Sassun."

== See also ==
- Soviet 89th "Tamanyan" Rifle Division
- Soviet 76th "K. Y. Voroshilov" Division
