= Hunan Avetisyan =

Soviet senior sergeant (1914–1943)

- Հունան Ավետիսյան; Уна́н Мкрти́чович Аветися́н
- Born: 20 July 1914; Tsav, Erivan Governorate, Russian Empire (now in Syunik Province, Armenia)
- Died: 16 September 1943 (aged 29); Krasnodar Krai, Russian SFSR, Soviet Union (now Russian Federation)
- Military career
- Allegiance: Soviet Union
- Branch: Red Army
- Service years: 1942–1943
- Rank: Senior sergeant
- Units: 390th Rifle Regiment; 89th Rifle Division; 18th Army; North Caucasus Front
- Conflicts: World War II; Battle of the Caucasus
- Awards: Hero of the Soviet Union; Order of Lenin

Hunan Avetisyan (Armenian: Հունան Ավետիսյան, Russian: Уна́н Мкрти́чович Аветися́н; 20 July 1914 – 16 September 1943) was a Soviet senior sergeant from the 89th Rifle Division who sacrificed his life by covering the embrasure of a German machine gun pillbox with his body so that his fellow soldiers could keep moving against the enemy in the Novorossiysk-Taman Operation of the Battle of the Caucasus. He was posthumously awarded the title Hero of the Soviet Union and Order of Lenin in recognition of his sacrifice by the Presidium of the Supreme Soviet of the USSR in May 1944.

== Biography ==
Hunan Avetisyan was born to an Armenian family in Tsav, a village of the Armenian Erivan Governorate of the Russian Empire (now in Syunik Province, Armenia) on 2 May 1913. His parents were peasants and he grew up in the local area, where he received primary education. He worked in the agriculture sector and was employed at a sovkhoz at the time of the German invasion of the Soviet Union.

Avetisyan entered the Red Army in 1942 during World War II and fought with the 390th Rifle Regiment of the Armenian-manned 89th Rifle Division, then with the 18th Army of the North Caucasus Front.

He was a senior sergeant assisting the leader of his platoon's First Company by September 1943, when the division received orders to attack the fortified German positions on the Taman Peninsula in the Novorossiysk-Taman Operation of the Battle of Caucasus.

On 16 September 1943, Avetisyan's company was ordered to storm and seize the German-held Dolgaya Height in the Krasnodar Krai near Novorossiysk in the offensive operation. The company was met with heavy fire from the machine-gun pillboxes, and Avetisyan successfully neutralized one of the enemy pillboxes by crawling up to it and throwing his grenades. The company was able to proceed, but its renewed attack was again met with machine gun fire coming from a second emplacement.

Sergeant Avetisyan again began to crawl toward the Germans, but failed to destroy the enemy inside the second pillbox with another grenade, and the fire coming from the Germans left him wounded in the attempt. He then threw his body at the embrasure. The company's advance was renewed and ended in the capture of the height. Suren Arakelyan, another soldier in the 89th Rifle Division, was also awarded the title Hero of the Soviet Union in May 1944. Also wounded by a machine gun emplacement, Arakelyan had covered an enemy embrasure in a similar attack a mere six days after Avetisyan's sacrifice.

Avetisyan was posthumously awarded the Soviet Union's highest honorary title and order by the Soviet government, receiving the title of Hero of the Soviet Union and the Order of Lenin from the Presidium of the Supreme Soviet of the Union of Soviet Socialist Republics on 16 May 1944.

He was buried in the small town of Verkhnebakansky in the city of Novorossiysk, Krasnodar Krai.

== Memory ==
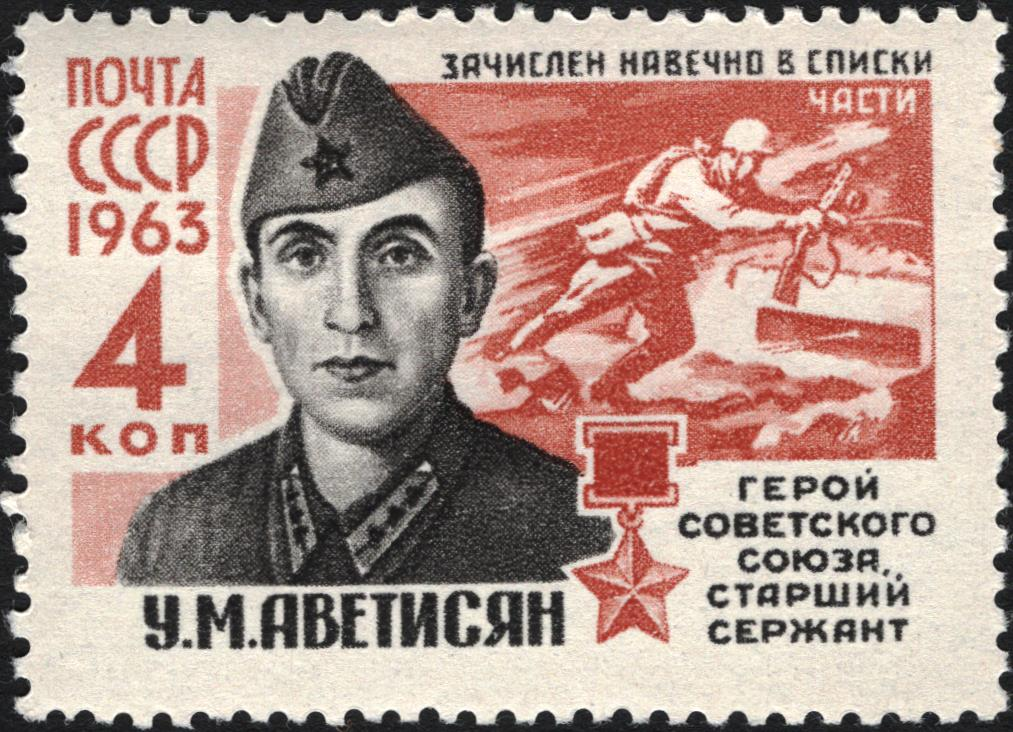
Senior Sergeant Avetisyan. Postage stamp of the Union of Soviet Socialist Republics, 1963.

Sergeant Avetisyan's portrait was featured on a 1963 Soviet postage stamp when the Soviet post issued a series of stamps honoring wartime heroes in the 1960s. Monuments of Avetisyan are located in the village of Tzav, his hometown, and the cities Kapan and Yerevan. A Hunan Avetisyan Primary School and a Hunan Avetisyan Street in Yerevan, as well as a Hunan Avetisyan Secondary School and Hunan Avetisyan Street in Kapan, were all named in his honor.

== Awards ==
- Hero of the Soviet Union (16 May 1944)
- Order of Lenin (16 May 1944)

== See also ==
- Huang Jiguang
