= Chengdu–Chongqing Expressway =

Road in China

Chengdu–Chongqing Expressway
- Chengyu Expressway 成渝高速公路
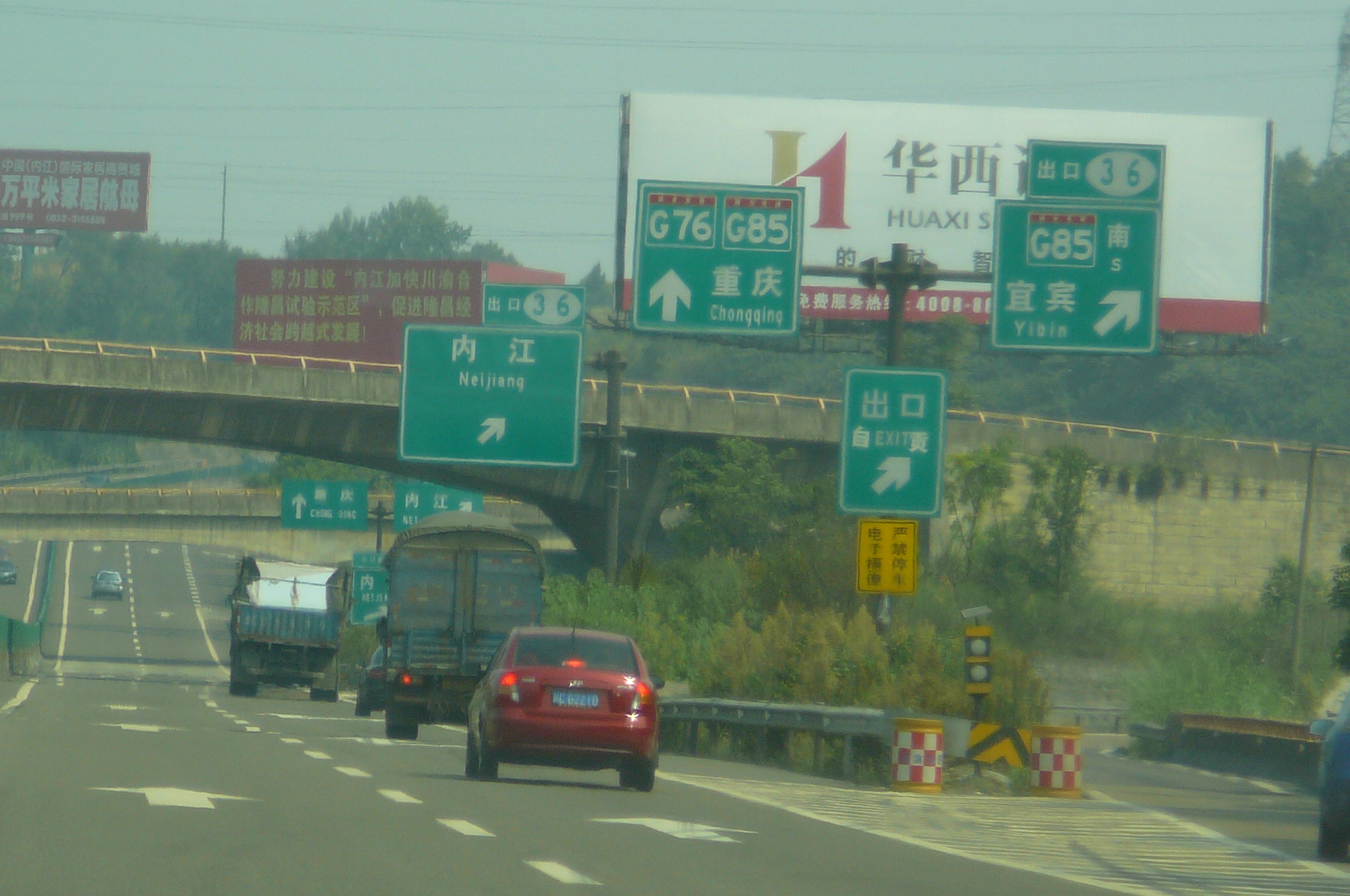
- Neijiang JCT

Route information
- Length: 340.2 km (211.4 mi)
- Existed: 1995–present

Major junctions
- West end: Chengdu-Chongqing Overpass, Chenghua District, Chengdu
- East end: Chenjiaping, Jiulongpo District, Chongqing

Location
- Country: China
- Province: Sichuan

Highway system
- Transport in China

Chengyu Expressway (Chinese: 成渝高速公路; pinyin: Chéngyú Gāosùgōnglù) is the first thruway from Chengdu to Chongqing, which was finished in 1995. The whole distance is about 340.2 kilometers, and between Wuguiqiao of Chengdu and Chenjiaping of Chongqing. It's now part of G76 Xiamen–Chengdu Expressway and G85 Yinchuan–Kunming Expressway.
