= Changzhou (disambiguation) =

Changzhou is a prefecture-level city in Jiangsu, China.

Changzhou may also refer to:

- a historical name of Suzhou, Jiangsu (written as 长洲, different from Changzhou City)
- Cháng Prefecture (written as 常州), prefecture between the 6th and 13th centuries in modern Jiangsu, China
- Changzhou dialect of Wu Chinese, spoken in Changzhou City
- Changzhou District, in Wuzhou, Guangxi, China
- Changzhou Island, in Guangzhou, Guangdong, China
- Cheung Chau, in Island District, Hong Kong, China
- Chinese frigate Changzhou, named for the city in Jiangsu

== See also ==
- Changshou (disambiguation)
