= Dong Cunrui =

Chinese soldier (1929–1948)

- 董存瑞
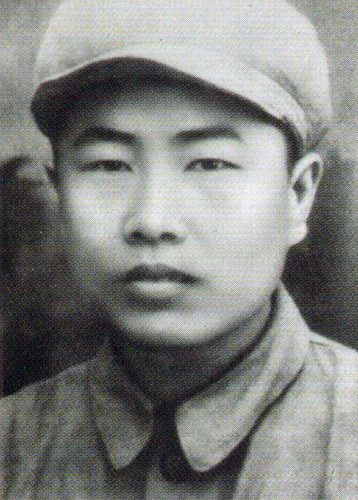
- Photo of Dong Cunrui
- Born: 1929; Huailai County, Zhangjiakou, Hebei province, China
- Died: 25 May 1948 (aged 18–19); Longhua County, Chengde, Hebei province, China
- Military career
- Allegiance: Chinese Communist Party
- Branch: People's Liberation Army Ground Force
- Service years: 1945–1948
- Conflicts: Chinese Civil War
- Awards: Order of Mao Zedong; Bravery Medal

Dong Cunrui (Chinese: 董存瑞; pinyin: Dǒng Cúnruì; 1929 - May 25, 1948) was a Chinese Communist soldier in the People's Liberation Army during the Chinese Civil War who committed suicide in order to destroy a Kuomintang bunker guarding an approach to an important bridge in Longhua County.

== Death ==
Under heavy fire, he reached the bunker, but there was no place to effectively position the explosives. Reportedly shouting "For a new China!", he detonated the explosives he carried, killing himself and the defenders within the bunker. His sacrifice was heavily publicized by the Chinese Communist Party, who called him a hero and model communist, and he remains well known in China. He was posthumously awarded three "Bravery Medals" and one "Mao Zedong Medal", and his squad was titled "Dong Cunrui Training Model Squad".

== Cultural depictions ==
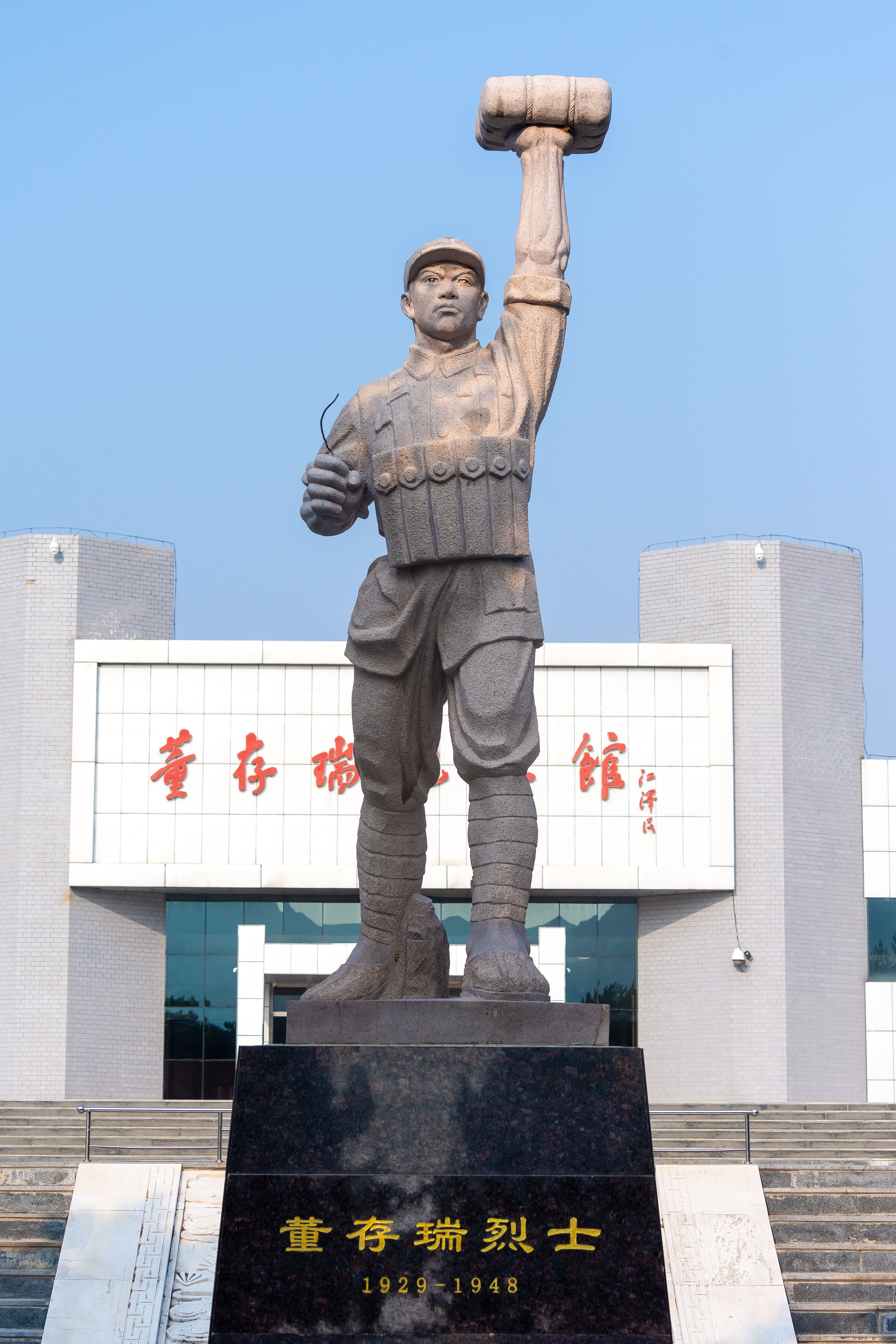
Statue of Dong Cunrui at Dong Cunrui Memorial Hall in Zhangjiakou.

In 1954, a biography of Dong (The Story of Dong Cunrui) was published, part of a broader trend of biographies of heroic soldiers. Dong was depicted in a 1955 film Dong Cunrui directed by Guo Wei and a 2009 TV miniseries titled For a new China, forward. His story was also published in national elementary Chinese textbooks.

== See also ==
- Lei Feng
- Zhang Side
- Huang Jiguang
- Qiu Shaoyun
- Zuo Quan
