= Chāng Prefecture =

Prefecture of the Tang Dynasty

- Chinese: 昌州
Transcriptions
Standard Mandarin
- Hanyu Pinyin: Chāng Zhōu
- Wade–Giles: Ch'ang^{1} Chou^{1}

Changzhou or Chang Prefecture was a zhou (prefecture) in imperial China, centering on modern western Chongqing, China. It existed (intermittently) from 785 until 1290.

== Geography ==
The administrative region of Chang Prefecture in the Tang dynasty was in modern western Chongqing (which borders Sichuan). It probably includes parts of modern:

- Dazu District
- Rongchang District
- Yongchuan District
