= Tongliang, Chongqing =

District of Chongqing, China

Tongliang 铜梁区
- District
- Location of Tongliang in Chongqing
- Country: People's Republic of China
- Municipality: Chongqing

Area
  - Total: 1,340 km^{2} (520 sq mi)

Population (2024)
  - Total: 685,700
  - Density: 512/km^{2} (1,330/sq mi)
- Time zone: UTC+8 (China Standard)

Tongliang District (Chinese: 铜梁区; pinyin: Tóngliáng Qū) is a district of Chongqing Municipality, China.

== Geography ==
Tongliang District covers 1,340.47 square kilometres (517.56 sq mi). Six tributaries of the Jialing River flow through Tongliang: the Fu River, Qiong River, Xiaoanxi, Pingtanhe, Jiuyuanhe, and Huaiyuanhe.

The name Tongliang was first recorded before 221 BCE, during the pre-Qin era and is derived from Tongliang Mountain, part of which now lies on the border with Hechuan District. Tongliang (lit. 'copper beam') refers to the colour and shape produced when sunlight reflects off the mountainside. Unlike other toponyms, Tongliang has continuously remained the place name for its namegiving settlement since its first usage.

== History ==
The Tongliang Culture site, unearthed at the Xiguo Reservoir in 1976, attests to human settlement since the Upper Paleolithic era, c. 20,000 years before its discovery. It was inhabited by the Ba people.

Tongliang was part of Liangzhou during the Xia and Shang dynasties, then the Ba state in the Zhou dynasty. Tongliang was a fief during the Warring States period. During the Qin and Han dynasties, Tongliang was administered by Dianjiang County under the Ba Commandery before becoming part of Shijing County (the modern Hechuan District) in Hezhou during the Sui and Tang dynasties. During this time, Tongliang contained parts of other modern districts, such as Tongnan and Dazu.

Tongliang was officially established as a county in 703 under Empress Wu Zetian during the Wu Zhou dynasty. Emperor Xuanzong of Tang moved Tongliang County three times within his reign, first from Tongliang's original location in Daichangba to Wujinkeng (now in Hechuan) in 715, then to Dongliuxi in 728, and finally to a more permanent area, south of Hechuan, in 735, with Bachuan County being split off from Tongliang. Between the Song and Yuan dynasties, Tongliang's territory fluctuated through merged counties, some of which were subsequently restored and added to other counties which were then returned to Tongliang.

In 1280, Kublai Khan abolished Bachuan County and merge it back into Tongliang, which was moved north to the counties of Shizhao (Hechuan), Dazu, and Suining. Territory was again added and removed in the following decades. Tongliang joined the Ming Xia under Ming Yuzhen, who restored sections of Tongliang previously given to Chang Prefecture. In 1480, four areas of Tongliang, Xingxing, Anle, Anzheng, and Wan'an, were ceded to Anju County, which was made part of Chongqing Prefecture. In 1662, Tongliang and Anju were merged into Hezhou before becoming counties again in 1721, still under Chongqing. Parts of Anju remained under independent control from Tongliang due to separating water levels. In 1903, Tongliang claimed authority over the remaining areas of Anju.

In mid-1911, the Railway Protection Movement based a branch in Tongliang, followed by the Tongliang County Military Government on 25 November of the same year. When the previous administrative structures were abolished in 1913, Tongliang was made part of East Sichuan Circuit. In 1928, Tongliang became directly administered by Sichuan Province. Between 1949 and 1955, various townships, towns, and villages were redistributed between Tongliang, Yongchuan, Dazu, and Hechuan. In 1983, Tongliang County was put under jurisdiction of Chongqing, as part of Yongchuan District. On 14 March 1994, the districts within Tongliang were given county-level status and October 2006, subdistricts were formed out of four towns. On 2 May 2014 Tongliang was upgraded from a county into a district within Chongqing, officially appearing as such in listings on 6 June 2014.

== Culture ==
Tongliang is best known for its particular variety of dragon dance, consisting of two acts, Dragon Lantern Dance and the Decorative Lantern Dance. Its unique traditions are believed to have their origins in the Ba people's Bashe. Its popularity has come to represent the dragon dances of Chongqing as a whole and it has been performed domestically and internationally by Tongliang city's dance troop. On 20 May 2006, Tongliang Dragon Dance was designated an intangible cultural heritage by the State Council.

The Huangjuemen Colorful Garden, where the dance is typically performed within Chongqing, also has the reputation as a faithful love spot, encouraging visiting couples to make vows and tie red ribbons to the entrance gate as a symbolic gesture.

Tongliang Museum holds a "Mini Terracotta Army" excavated from the family tomb of Ming dynasty official Chen Jia, his parents, and his nephew. Unlike the Terracotta Army of Qin Shi Huang, the statues were individually hand-carved and not burned.

Anju, the oldest town in Tongliang, was established in 588 as Chishui County, renamed in 1480 and finally incorporated into Tongliang County in 1728. It is a AAAA Tourist Attraction for its ancient age, Ba–Shu culture, records of visiting poets, and history during the Second Sino-Japanese War.

== Administrative divisions ==
As of 2025, Tongliang contains 5 subdistricts and 23 towns.

Name	Chinese (S)	Hanyu Pinyin	Population (2010)	Area (km^{2})
Bachuan Subdistrict	巴川街道	Bāchuān Jiēdào	80,534	37.33
Dongcheng Subdistrict	东城街道	Dōngchéng Jiēdào	78,721	
Nancheng Subdistrict	南城街道	Nánchéng Jiēdào	49,265	60.34
Jiuxian Subdistrict	旧县街道	Jiùxiàn Jiēdào	31,499	63.4
Pulü Subdistrict	蒲吕街道	Púlǚ Jiēdào	22,719	42
Shiyu town	石鱼镇	Shíyú Zhèn	14,050	42
Tuqiao town	土桥镇	Tǔqiáo Zhèn	13,496	50.5
Erping town	二坪镇	Èrpíng Zhèn	7,806	26.4
Shuikou town	水口镇	Shuǐkǒu Zhèn	5,729	23
Anju town	安居镇	Ānjū Zhèn	21,000	57.4
Baiyang town	白羊镇	Báiyáng Zhèn	9,284	44
Pingtan town	平滩镇	Píngtān Zhèn	30,816	91
Fuguo town	福果镇	Fúguǒ Zhèn	12,161	37
Weixin town	维新镇	Wéixīn Zhèn	10,872	
Gaolou town	高楼镇	Gāolóu Zhèn	6,364	26.5
Damiao town	大庙镇	Dàmiào Zhèn	16,277	41.4
Weilong town	围龙镇	Wéilóng Zhèn	14,690	46.5
Huaxing town	华兴镇	Huáxìng Zhèn	9,316	40
Yongjia town	永嘉镇	Yǒngjiā Zhèn	22,377	64
Anxi town	安溪镇	Ānxī Zhèn	6,075	29
Xihe town	西河镇	Xīhé Zhèn	12,567	40
Taiping town	太平镇	Tàipíng Zhèn	17,909	48.2
Hufeng town	虎峰镇	Hǔfēng Zhèn	30,248	54.8
Shaoyun town	少云镇	Shǎoyún Zhèn	19,174	51.5
Lüfeng town	侣俸镇	Lǚfèng Zhèn	33,968	51.13
Xiaolin town	小林镇	Xiǎolín Zhèn	6,753	30.67
Shuangshan town	双山镇	Shuāngshān Zhèn	7,329	33.83
Qinglong town	庆隆镇	Qìnglóng Zhèn	9,087	28

== Climate ==
Climate data for Tongliang, elevation 326 m (1,070 ft), (1991–2020 normals, extremes 1981–present)
Month	Jan	Feb	Mar	Apr	May	Jun	Jul	Aug	Sep	Oct	Nov	Dec	Year
Record high °C (°F)	18.4 (65.1)	24.3 (75.7)	34.0 (93.2)	35.0 (95.0)	37.4 (99.3)	38.0 (100.4)	40.3 (104.5)	42.9 (109.2)	44.1 (111.4)	35.3 (95.5)	26.2 (79.2)	18.8 (65.8)	44.1 (111.4)
Mean daily maximum °C (°F)	10.1 (50.2)	13.2 (55.8)	18.2 (64.8)	23.7 (74.7)	27.1 (80.8)	29.3 (84.7)	32.9 (91.2)	33.2 (91.8)	27.9 (82.2)	21.7 (71.1)	16.9 (62.4)	11.2 (52.2)	22.1 (71.8)
Daily mean °C (°F)	7.5 (45.5)	10.0 (50.0)	14.1 (57.4)	19.1 (66.4)	22.5 (72.5)	25.1 (77.2)	28.3 (82.9)	28.3 (82.9)	23.9 (75.0)	18.5 (65.3)	13.9 (57.0)	8.9 (48.0)	18.3 (65.0)
Mean daily minimum °C (°F)	5.6 (42.1)	7.7 (45.9)	11.3 (52.3)	15.9 (60.6)	19.3 (66.7)	22.2 (72.0)	25.0 (77.0)	24.8 (76.6)	21.2 (70.2)	16.5 (61.7)	11.9 (53.4)	7.2 (45.0)	15.7 (60.3)
Record low °C (°F)	−1.6 (29.1)	0.1 (32.2)	0.4 (32.7)	6.6 (43.9)	10.4 (50.7)	14.8 (58.6)	18.2 (64.8)	17.4 (63.3)	13.1 (55.6)	6.4 (43.5)	2.7 (36.9)	−2.2 (28.0)	−2.2 (28.0)
Average precipitation mm (inches)	17.8 (0.70)	19.8 (0.78)	44.6 (1.76)	87.8 (3.46)	129.2 (5.09)	193.8 (7.63)	178.7 (7.04)	143.3 (5.64)	115.9 (4.56)	88.7 (3.49)	41.8 (1.65)	21.0 (0.83)	1,082.4 (42.63)
Average precipitation days (≥ 0.1 mm)	10.1	8.8	11.5	13.3	15.4	16.1	12.1	10.8	13.4	16.5	11.6	9.9	149.5
Average snowy days	0.3	0.1	0	0	0	0	0	0	0	0	0	0.2	0.6
Average relative humidity (%)	85	81	77	76	76	81	77	74	80	86	86	86	80
Mean monthly sunshine hours	31.6	41.9	86.4	119.4	123.4	108.7	173.0	180.7	101.6	53.8	45.9	25.0	1,091.4
Percentage possible sunshine	10	13	23	31	29	26	41	45	28	15	15	8	24
Source: China Meteorological Administration

== 2004 bombing ==
On 18 November 2004, at about 15:50, a bombing at the Tang San teahouse during a low-stake card game event in Xima village, Bachuan, killed 15 people, including the perpetrator, and injured 28 others. The bomber, 41-year-old Yuan Daizhong (袁代中) had fatally stabbed his wife Tan Bishu (谭碧书) earlier the same day at their home in Yueyang village, less than one kilometre from the teahouse. Yuan had called relatives to confess about the murder shortly before the bombing and stopped by his child's school to hand over his life savings (¥380). Yuan had substantial gambling debts and Tan, who was threatening divorce, had recently blocked her husband's access to their finances.

== Education ==
Chongqing Tongliang NO.1 Experimental Primary School is among the best primary schools of Chongqing.

Chongqing Tongliang NO.2 Experimental Primary School is in this district.

Chongqing Bachuan International High School is a private school in the district, which is known as an expert of junior and high school education.

Chongqing Tongliang Bachuan Middle School.

Tongliang Zhong Xue is a well known school in the Tongliang district. It has a long history and many of its students have gone on to attend some of the top universities in China.

== Notable people ==
- Qiu Shaoyun (1926–1952), soldier of the Korean War and national martyr
- Wang Shu (fl.1721–1740), Qing dynasty official, jinshi degree holder, and governor of Fujian
- Zhang Jiayin (1527–1588), Ming dynasty official, jinshi degree holder, and governor of Jiliao circuit
- Wu Hong'en (1834–), Qing dynasty official, jinshi degree holder, and prefect for various prefectures
- Wu Rujia, son of Wang Shu, Qing dynasty official, jinshi degree holder, and contributor to the Siku Quanshu
- Zeng Yuhuang (1788–1853), Qing dynasty official, jinshi degree holder, and shujishi
- Hu Yaochen (1507–1579), Ming dynasty official, jinshi degree holder, and governor of Hunan
- Wang Rubi (1747–1806), Qing dynasty official, jinshi degree holder, and governor of Anhui
- Tian Xiwei (1997 - ), Chinese Actress
