= Tsav, Armenia =

Tsav Ծավ
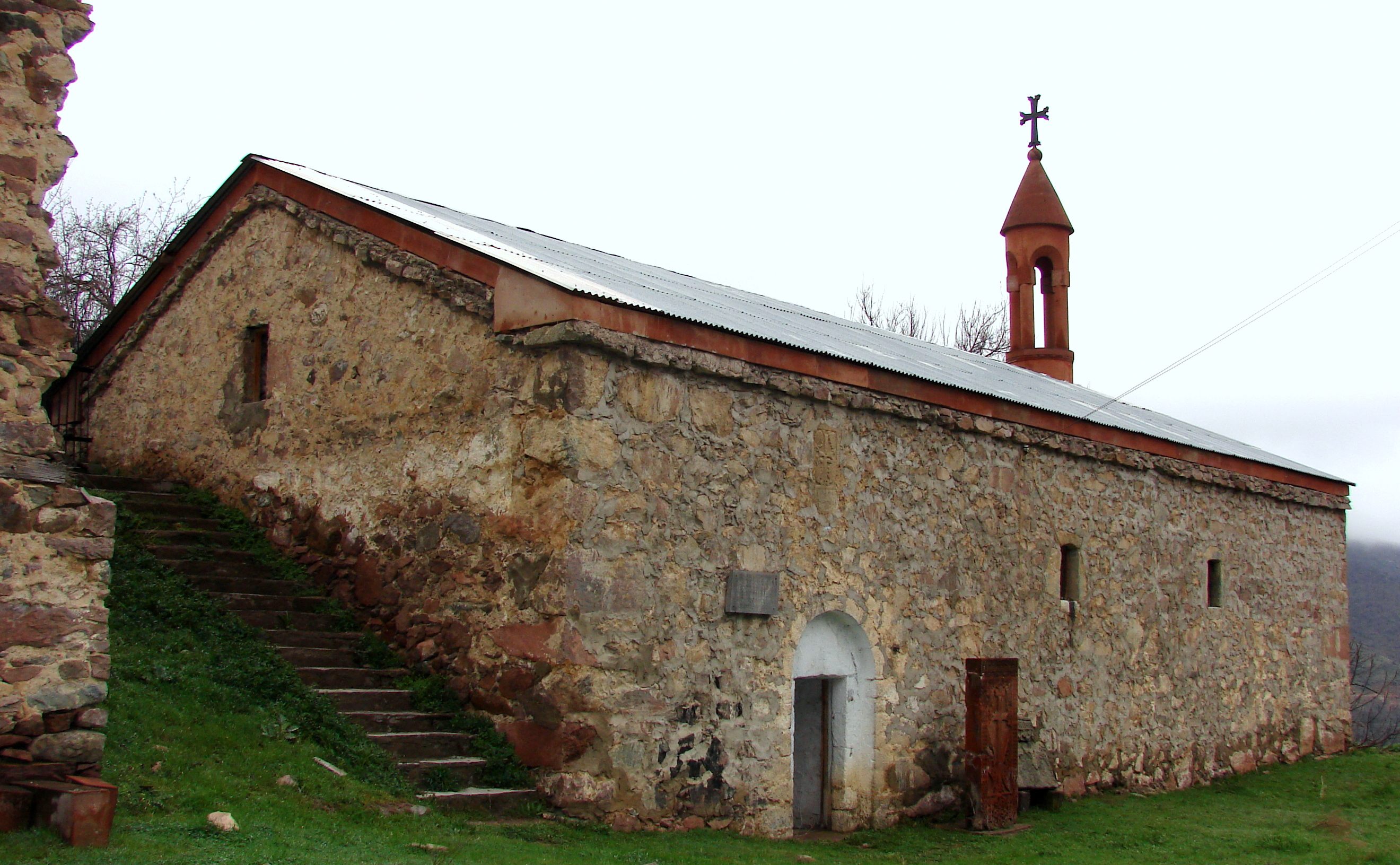
- Surb Gevorg church in Tsav

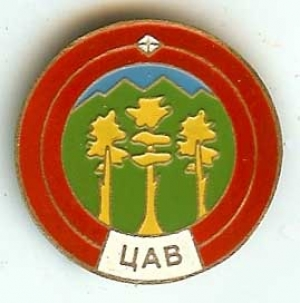
- Coat of arms

- Location within Armenia Location within Syunik Province
- Coordinates: 39°03′07″N 46°27′29″E
- Country: Armenia
- Province: Syunik
- Municipality: Kapan

Area
  - Total: 59.44 km^{2} (22.95 sq mi)

Population (2011)
  - Total: 74
  - Density: 1.2/km^{2} (3.2/sq mi)
- Time zone: UTC+4 (AMT)

Tsav (Armenian: Ծավ) is a village in the Kapan Municipality of the Syunik Province in Armenia.

== Economy and culture ==
The village has a fish farm, a school, and a clinic.

== Demographics ==
The village's population was 74 at the 2011 census, down from 157 at the 2001 census.

== Municipal administration ==
The village was the center of the Tsav community, which contained the villages of Tsav and Shishkert until the June 2017 administrative and territorial reforms, when the village became a part of the Kapan Municipality. The Statistical Committee of Armenia reported Tsav community's population as 351 in 2010, down from 499 at the 2001 census.

== Gallery ==
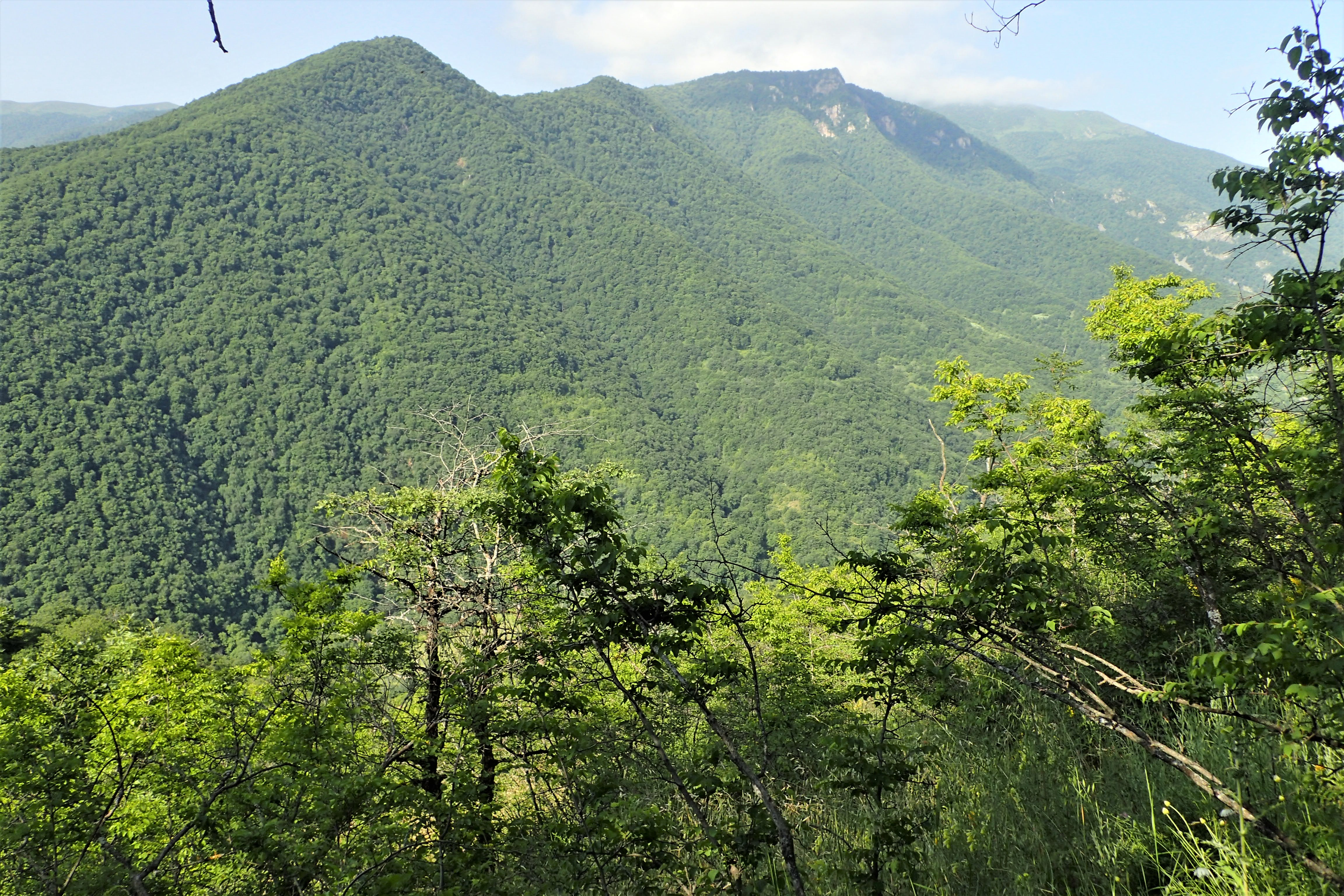
Shikahogh State Reserve seen from the road east from Tsav

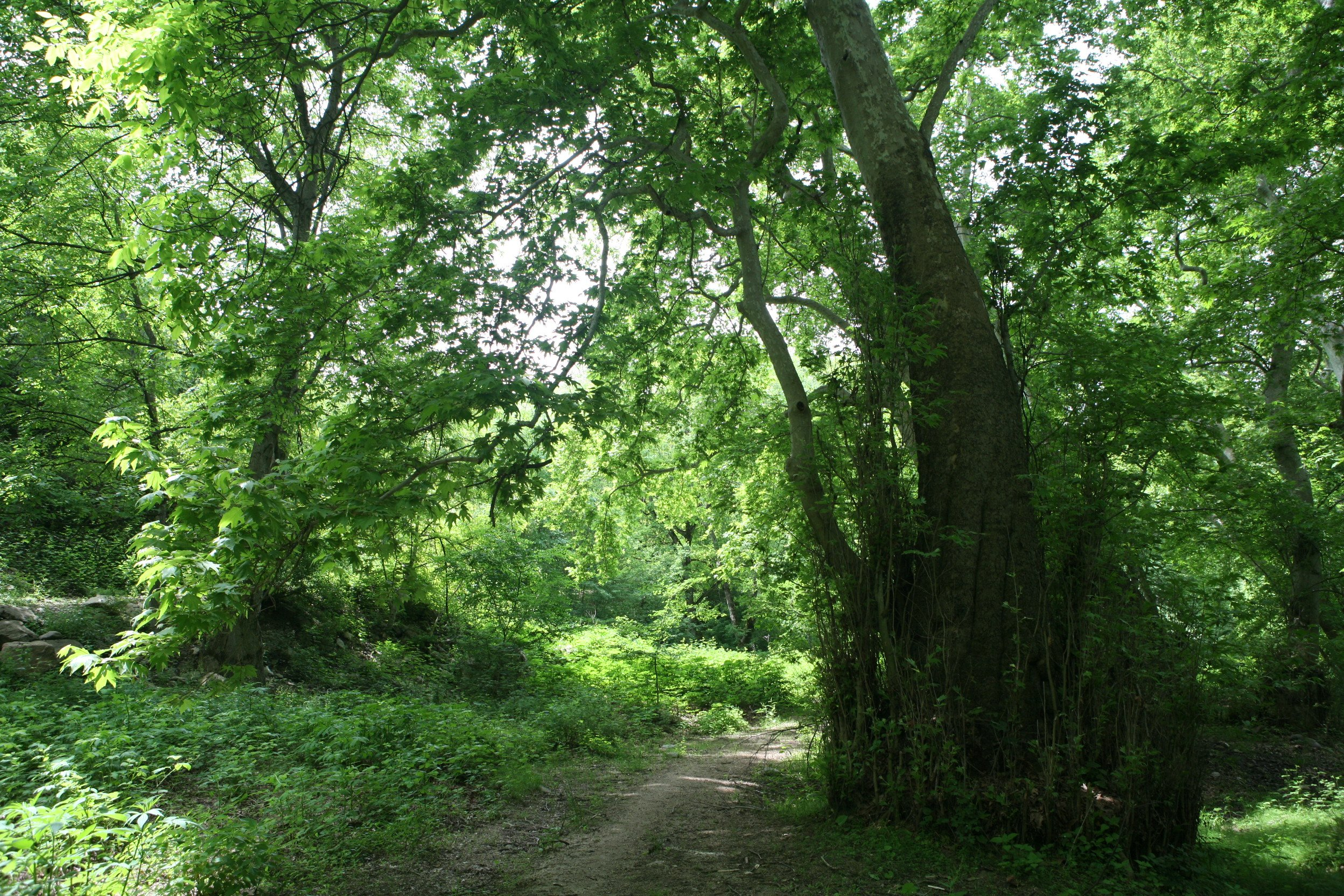
Oriental Plane grove in the Valley of the Tsav River

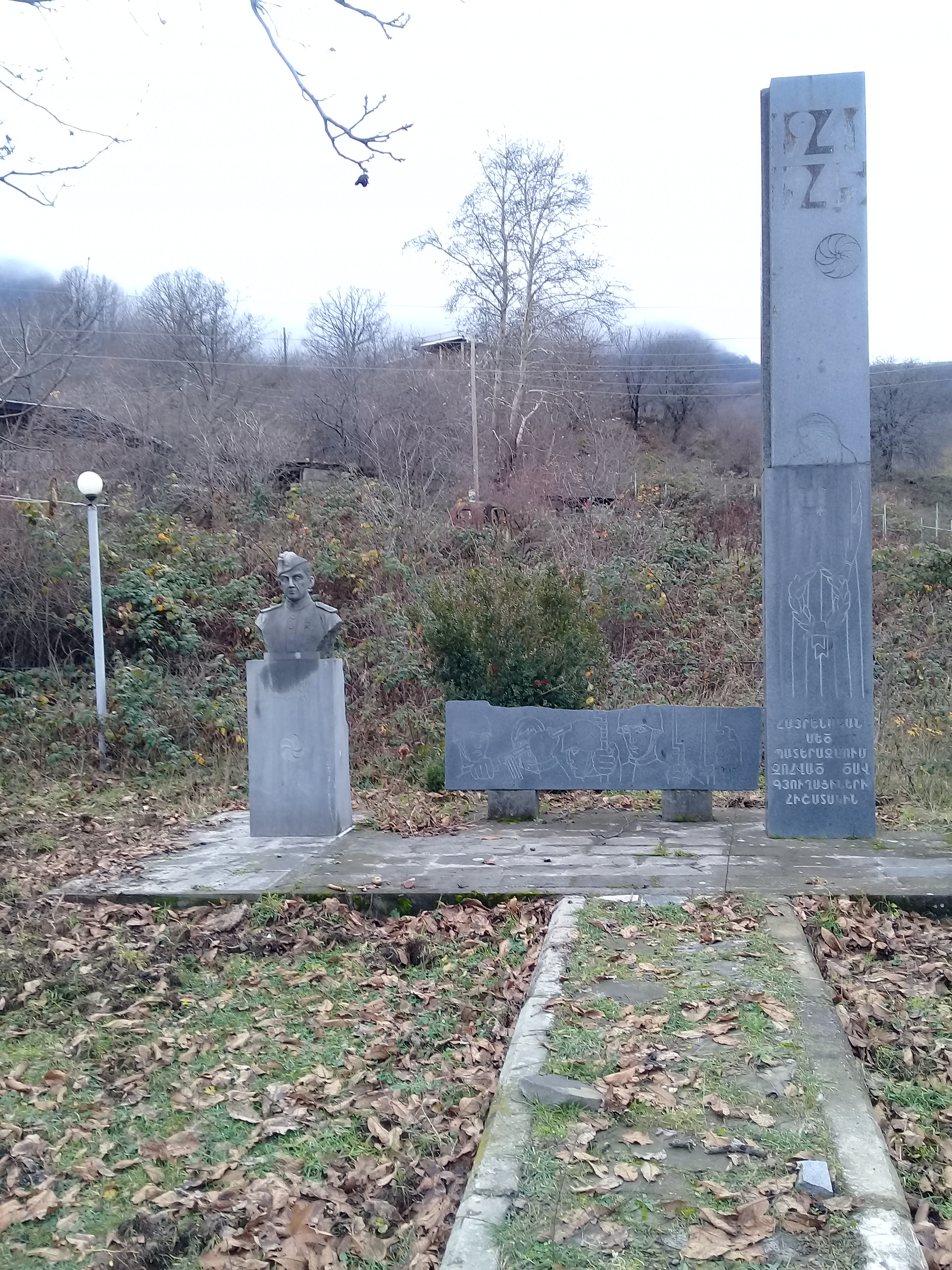
WWII monument
