= Yongchuan, Chongqing =

Coordinates: 29°22′N 105°54′E

Yongchuan 永川区
- District
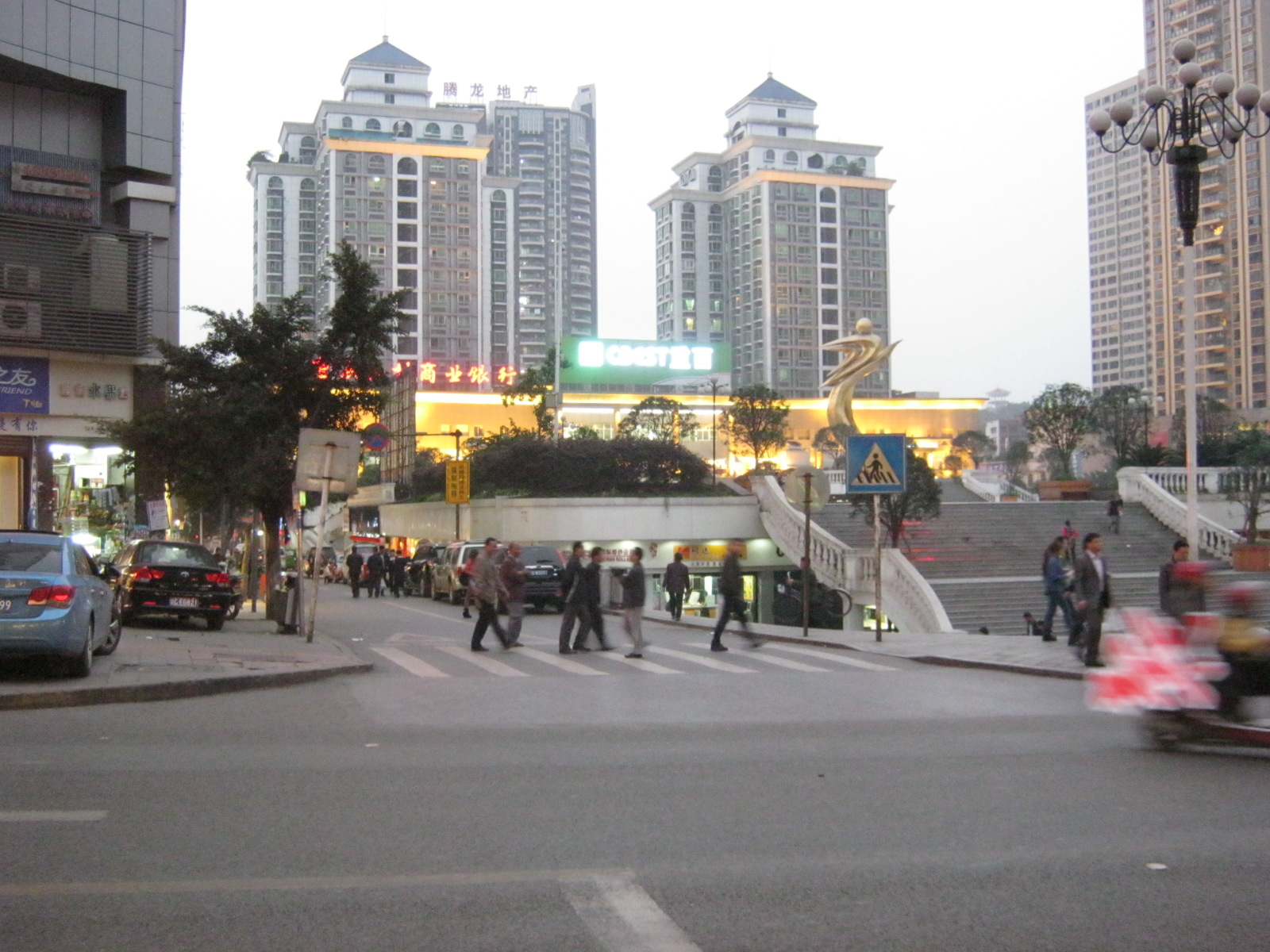
- Skyline of Yongchuan

- Yongchuan District in Chongqing
- Country: People's Republic of China
- Municipality: Chongqing
- Time zone: UTC+8 (China Standard)
- Website: http://yc.cq.gov.cn/

Yongchuan (Chinese: 永川区; pinyin: Yǒngchuān Qū) is a district of Chongqing, China, located by the north side of upper reach of Yangtze River, with a history of 1200 years. Yongchuan borders Sichuan province to the southwest and is 63 km (39 mi) away from Yuzhong District of central Chongqing and 276 km (171 mi) from Chengdu.

== Administration ==
Yongchuan District administers 19 townships and 3 subdistricts.

Name	Chinese (S)	Hanyu Pinyin	Population (2010)	Area (km^{2})
Zhongshan Road Subdistrict	中山路街道	Zhōngshānlù Jiēdào	192,954	61.57
Shengli Road Subdistrict	胜利路街道	Shènglìlù Jiēdào	134,218	61.76
Nanda Avenue Subdistrict	南大街街道	Nándàjiē Jiēdào	88,948	78.3
Chashanzhuhai Subdistrict	茶山竹海街道	Cháshānzhúhǎi Jiēdào	42,383	96.6
Da'an Subdistrict	大安街道	Dà'ān Jiēdào	48,371	92.46
Chenshi Subdistrict	陈食街道	Chénshí Jiēdào	39,863	84
Weixinghu Subdistrict	卫星湖街道	Wèixīnghú Jiēdào	38,112	67.83
Qingfeng town	青峰镇	Qīngfēng Zhèn	19,627	49
Jinlong town	金龙镇	Jīnlóng Zhèn	21,665	91.56
Linjiang town	临江镇	Línjiāng Zhèn	25,740	77.1
Hegeng town	何埂镇	Hégěng Zhèn	38,106	81
Songgai town	松溉镇	Sōnggài Zhèn	14,270	34
Xianlong town	仙龙镇	Xiānlóng Zhèn	36,561	83.2
Ji'an town	吉安镇	Jí'ān Zhèn	20,978	60.01
Wujian town	五间镇	Wǔjiān Zhèn	19,861	35.5
Laisu town	来苏镇	Láisū Zhèn	41,361	95.6
Baofeng town	宝峰镇	Bǎofēng Zhèn	14,007	39
Shuangshi town	双石镇	Shuāngshí Zhèn	24,315	66
Honglu town	红炉镇	Hónglú Zhèn	21,618	64
Yongrong town	永荣镇	Yǒngróng Zhèn	14,305	43
Sanjiao town	三教镇	Sānjiào Zhèn	46,458	108
Banqiao town	板桥镇	Bǎnqiáo Zhèn	22,725	70.77
Zhutuo town	朱沱镇	Zhūtuó Zhèn	58,262	128

== History ==
Yongchuan enjoys a history of 1200 years.

- In 776, Yongchuan county was established.
- In 1983, Yongchuan county was put under the administration of Chongqing city.
- In 1992, Yongchuan county was promoted to a city level, called Yongchuan city.
- In 2006, Yongchuan city was changed into Yongchuan district, a county-level division of Chongqing.

== Geographic condition ==
Yongchuan is in west Chongqing, in border with Bishan and Jiangjin in east, with Dazu and Rongchang in west, with Tongliang in north, and with Luxiang and Hejiang. Yongchuan is located in 105°37′31″－106°5′7″ of longitude and 28°56′16″－29°34′30″ of north latitude. It is 70.65 km (43.90 mi) long from south end to north end and 44.85 km (27.87 mi) wide from east end to north end, total area is 1,572.66 km^{2} (607.21 sq mi).

== Climate ==
The climate of Yongchuan belongs to subtropic monsoon weather style, with an annual average temperature of 17.7°C, monthly average temperature of 7.2°C in January, 27.3°C in July, total annual radiation of 1273.6 hrs, total annual rainfall of 1015 mm, frost-free period of 317 days .

Climate data for Yongchuan, elevation 353 m (1,158 ft), (1991–2020 normals, extremes 1981–present)
Month	Jan	Feb	Mar	Apr	May	Jun	Jul	Aug	Sep	Oct	Nov	Dec	Year
Record high °C (°F)	18.0 (64.4)	23.7 (74.7)	34.1 (93.4)	34.9 (94.8)	36.7 (98.1)	37.2 (99.0)	39.3 (102.7)	41.9 (107.4)	42.1 (107.8)	34.2 (93.6)	26.4 (79.5)	19.2 (66.6)	42.1 (107.8)
Mean daily maximum °C (°F)	9.9 (49.8)	13.0 (55.4)	18.0 (64.4)	23.3 (73.9)	26.6 (79.9)	28.6 (83.5)	32.4 (90.3)	32.7 (90.9)	27.5 (81.5)	21.2 (70.2)	16.7 (62.1)	11.1 (52.0)	21.8 (71.2)
Daily mean °C (°F)	7.3 (45.1)	9.8 (49.6)	14.0 (57.2)	18.8 (65.8)	22.1 (71.8)	24.6 (76.3)	27.8 (82.0)	27.7 (81.9)	23.5 (74.3)	18.2 (64.8)	13.8 (56.8)	8.7 (47.7)	18.0 (64.4)
Mean daily minimum °C (°F)	5.5 (41.9)	7.6 (45.7)	11.2 (52.2)	15.6 (60.1)	18.9 (66.0)	21.7 (71.1)	24.3 (75.7)	24.2 (75.6)	20.7 (69.3)	16.2 (61.2)	11.8 (53.2)	7.1 (44.8)	15.4 (59.7)
Record low °C (°F)	−2.6 (27.3)	0.0 (32.0)	0.0 (32.0)	6.0 (42.8)	9.0 (48.2)	14.8 (58.6)	18.2 (64.8)	18.0 (64.4)	13.8 (56.8)	6.9 (44.4)	3.2 (37.8)	−2.4 (27.7)	−2.6 (27.3)
Average precipitation mm (inches)	15.2 (0.60)	18.1 (0.71)	42.2 (1.66)	79.2 (3.12)	115.4 (4.54)	191.4 (7.54)	168.8 (6.65)	134.0 (5.28)	112.6 (4.43)	82.5 (3.25)	37.4 (1.47)	19.2 (0.76)	1,016 (40.01)
Average precipitation days (≥ 0.1 mm)	10.9	8.8	11.7	13.7	15.7	17.2	13.0	12.0	13.5	17.1	11.6	10.6	155.8
Average snowy days	0.4	0.1	0	0	0	0	0	0	0	0	0	0.2	0.7
Average relative humidity (%)	84	79	76	75	76	81	77	73	80	86	85	85	80
Mean monthly sunshine hours	35.6	47.1	89.7	122.5	127.1	111.3	185.8	186.1	113.6	57.8	53.1	32.7	1,162.4
Percentage possible sunshine	11	15	24	32	30	27	44	46	31	16	17	10	25
Source: China Meteorological Administration

== Transportation ==
The Yangtze river passes through Jiangjin, making up a 17.6 km long waterway. Both the Chengdu-Chongqing freeway and Chengdu-Chongqing railway have their ways across Yongchuan, which make up a very convenient traffic condition.

== Economy ==
- Yongchuan is one of important agricultural production areas in China, with a products include of rice, wheat, sweet potato, tea, vegetables, fruits, silk and bamboo. Its animal husbandry include pig raising etc.
- In 2006, its total annual GDP was CNY12.194 billion.

== Tourism ==
The famous tourism place in Yongchuan is the Tea Mountain and Bamboo Sea.
