= Huang Jiguang =

Chinese war hero of the Korean War (1931–1952)

- An artist's depiction of Huang Jiguang charging the enemy machine gun position
- Native name: 黄继光
- Born: January 18, 1931; Huang Jiguang Village, Zhongjiang County, Sichuan, China
- Died: October 19, 1952 (aged 21) Chorwon County, North Korea
- Conflicts: Korean War †
- Awards: Order of the National Flag (First-Class)

Huang Jiguang (Chinese: 黄继光; pinyin: Huáng Jìguāng; January 18, 1931 – October 19, 1952) was a highly-decorated Chinese soldier, considered a war hero for sacrificing himself to block an enemy machine gun emplacement with his body during the Korean War.

== Early life ==
Huang was born in Sichuan Province in 1931. His mother was Deng Fangzhi and brother was Huang Jishu. In March 1951, Huang decided to join the People's Volunteer Army to serve in the Korean War.

After joining the war, Huang became a runner and was later awarded the Meritorious Service, Third Class for his bravery.

== Death ==
At the Battle of Triangle Hill in October 1952, Huang's unit was tasked with destroying an enemy blockhouse. According to official accounts, Huang hurled himself against a machine gun slit on the blockhouse after running out of ammunition. Though he was promptly killed by the gun, his body managed to block enemy fire, allowing Chinese forces to advance and overrun the position.

According to later recollections, Huang had seen the film and expressed admiration for Matrosov; some accounts therefore present his sacrifice as inspired by Matrosov.

== Awards ==
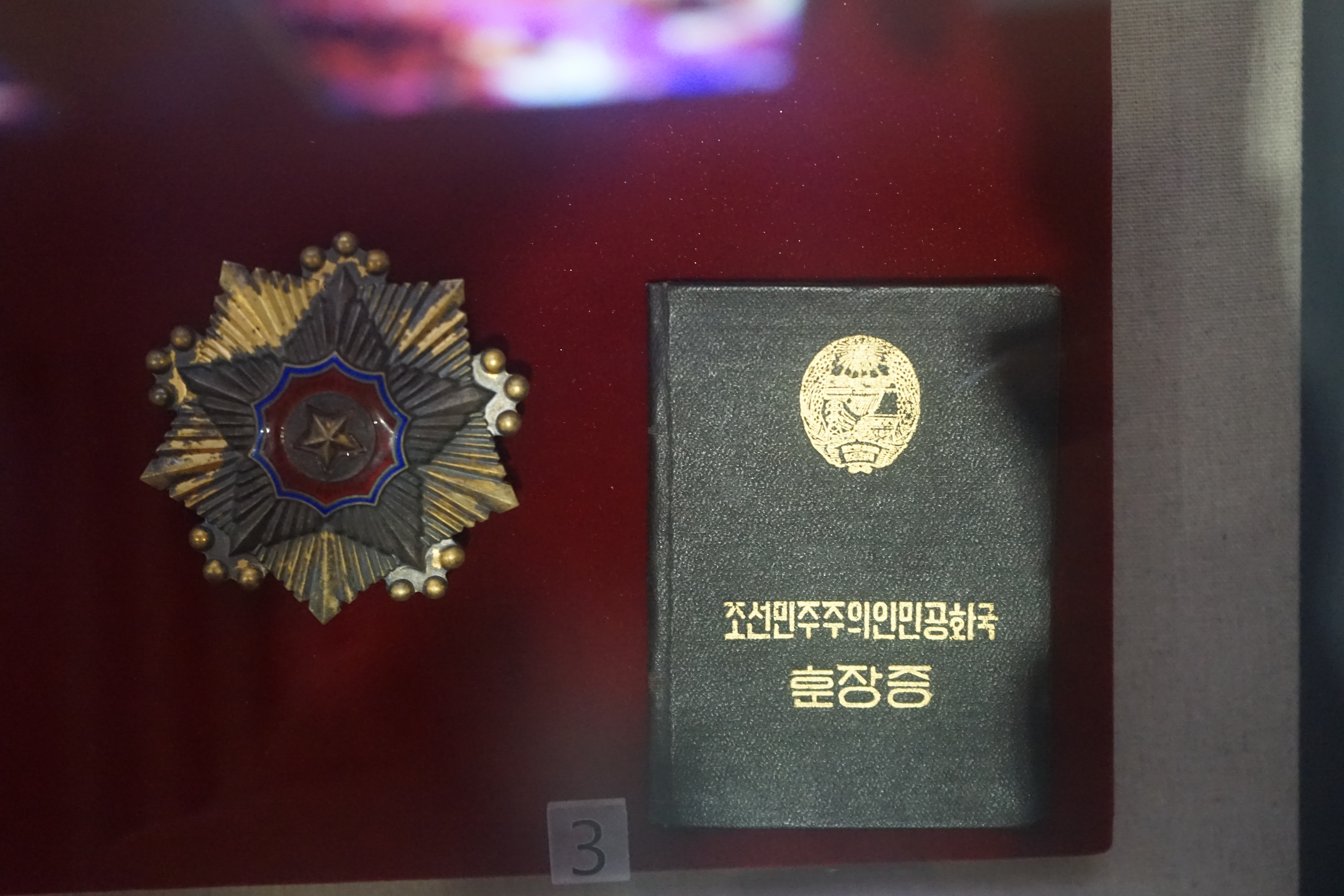
Order of the National Flag for Huang

Huang was posthumously given the title of "Combat Hero, Second Class", which was later upgraded to "Combat Hero, Special Class". The North Korean government also awarded Huang with the title of "Hero of the Democratic People's Republic of Korea", a Gold Star Medal and the Order of the National Flag (First-Class).

== Legacy ==
A company of People's Liberation Army Air Force Airborne Corps is named after Huang Jiguang.

== See also ==
- Hunan Avetisyan
- Dong Cunrui
- Qiu Shaoyun
- Alexander Matrosov
