= Cháng Prefecture =

Historical administrative division in Jiangsu, China

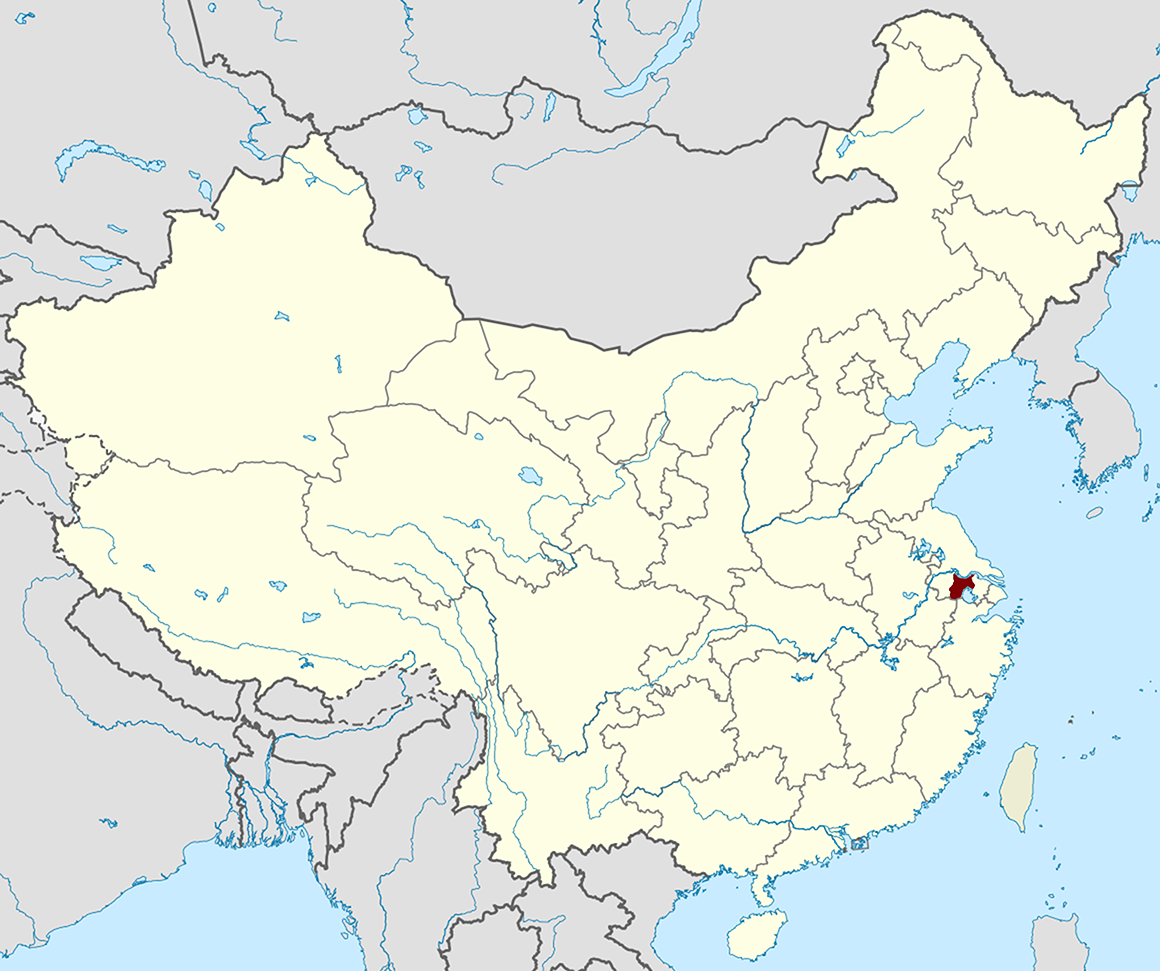
- Chinese: 常州
Transcriptions
Standard Mandarin
- Hanyu Pinyin: Cháng Zhōu
- Wade–Giles: Ch'ang^{2} Chou^{1}

Changzhou or Chang Prefecture was a zhou (prefecture) in imperial China, centering on modern Changzhou, Jiangsu, China. It existed (intermittently) from 589 until 1277, when the Yuan dynasty renamed it Changzhou Route.

The modern prefecture-level city Changzhou, created in 1949, retains its name.

== Geography ==
The administrative region of Chang Prefecture in the Tang dynasty was in modern southern Jiangsu directly to the north of Lake Tai. It probably includes parts of modern:

- Under the administration of Changzhou:
  - Changzhou
- Under the administration of Wuxi:
  - Wuxi
  - Jiangyin
  - Yixing

== See also ==
- Jinling Commandery
- Changzhou Route
