= Fengdu railway station =

Railway station in Chongqing

Fengdu 丰都

General information
- Location: Sanhe Subdistrict, Fengdu County, Chongqing; China
- Coordinates: 29°50′44″N 107°41′24″E
- Operator: China Railway Corporation
- Line: Chongqing–Lichuan railway

History
- Opened: 23 December 2013; 12 years ago
Location
- Location within Chongqing

Fengdu railway station is a railway station in Fengdu County, Chongqing, on the Chongqing–Lichuan railway. It is operated by the China Railway Corporation. The station opened on 28 December 2013.

Preceding station	China Railway High-speed	Following station
Fuling North towards Chongqing North	Chongqing–Lichuan railway	Shizhuxian towards Lichuan

== Services ==
Within the station, there are various facilities for patrons including restrooms, limited food facilities, ticketing desks, a small outdoor plaza with seating, and a large parking lot. Parking is limited during business days due to commuter traffic.

Some facilities such as food and ticketing do not operate after 18:00 local time. During periods of high traffic, such as local Fengdu events, station facilities may open early and remain open later. All modified operation times are at made at the discretion of station management.

== Attractions ==
Fengdu station is a railway station is the closest station on the Chongqing–Lichuan for attractions such as Shuangguishang Forest, the town of Fengdu, and Fengdu Ghost City shrine.
