= Liangwu railway station =

Railway station in Lichuan, Hubei, China

Liangwu 凉雾
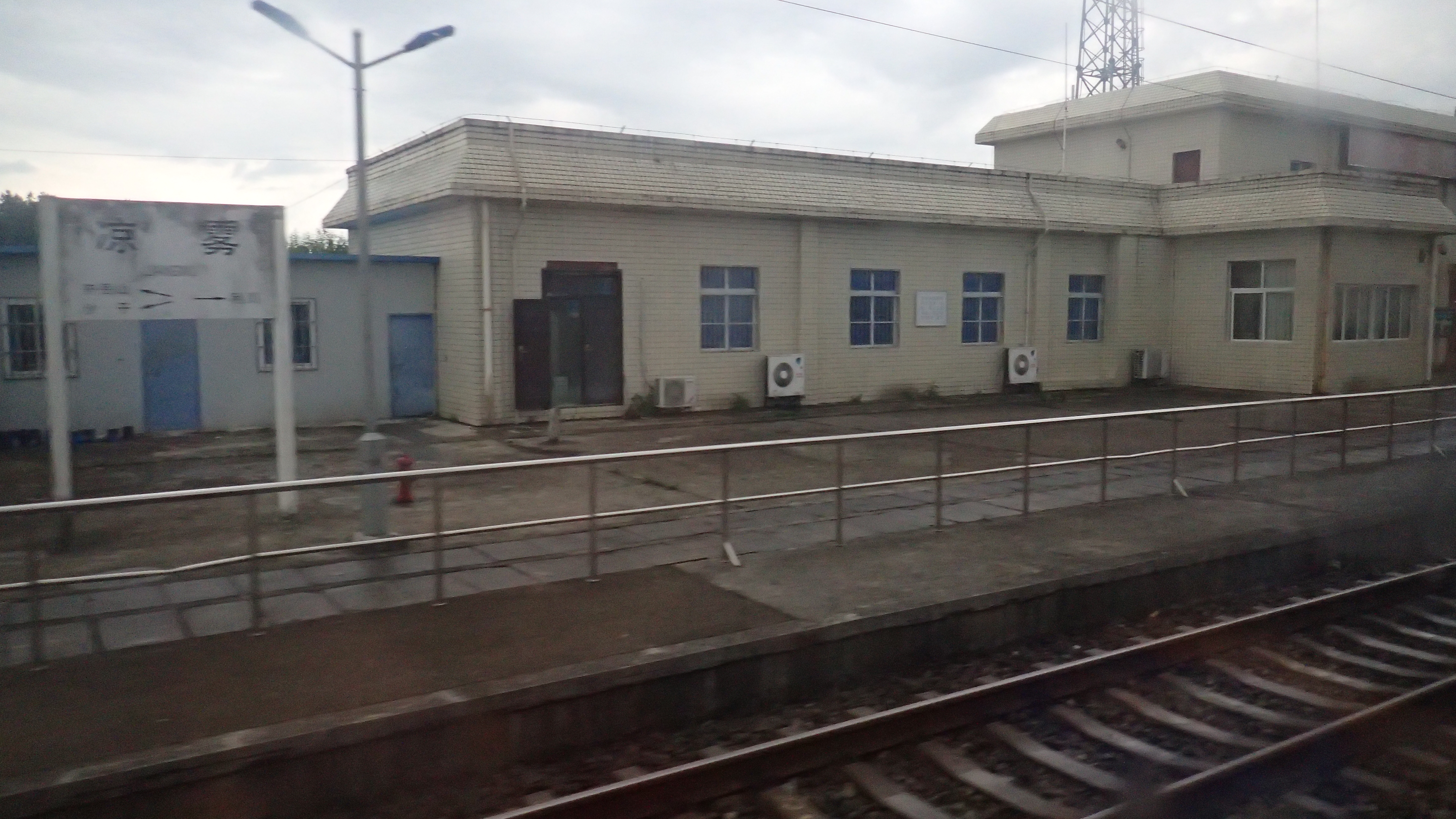
- Liangwu station in 2017

General information
- Location: Liangwu Township, Lichuan City, Enshi, Hubei; China
- Coordinates: 30°15′54″N 108°48′32″E
- Operated by: China Railway Corporation
- Lines: Yiwan Railway, Yuli Railway
Location

Liangwu station (凉雾站) is a railway station in Liangwu Township, Lichuan City, Enshi, Hubei Province in China. It is the junction station where the Yuli Railway (Chongqing-Lichuan) joins the Yiwan Railway (Yichang-Wanzhou).

Preceding station	China Railway High-speed	Following station
Shaziguan towards Chongqing North	Chongqing–Lichuan railway	Lichuan Terminus
Lichuan towards Yichang East	Yichang–Wanzhou railway	Qiyueshan towards Wanzhou
