= Xiazhou Yangtze River Rail-Road Bridge =

Xiazhou Yangtze River Rail-Road Bridge 峡州长江公铁大桥
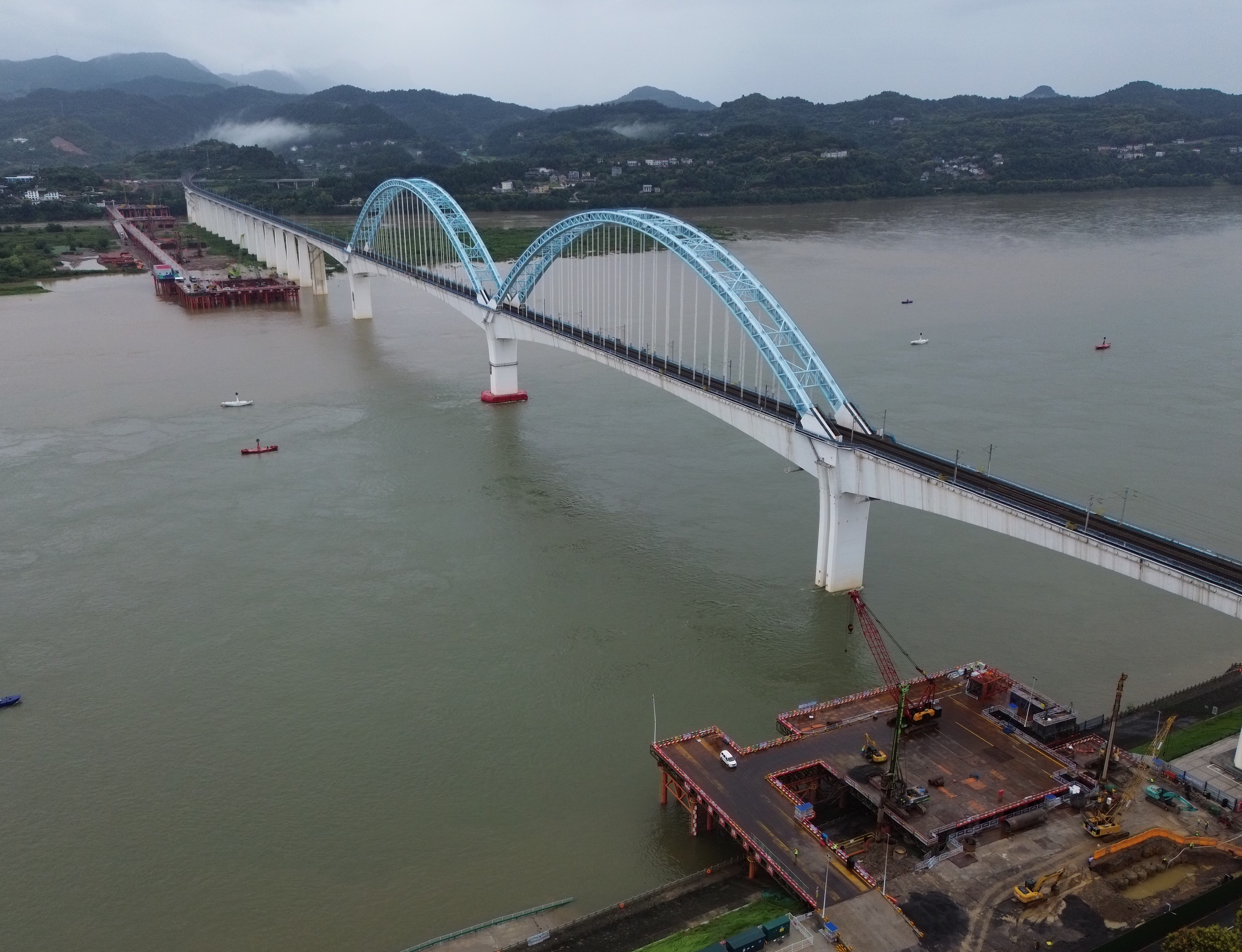
- The bridge in September 2025 from the Yichang side
- Coordinates: 30°39′20″N 111°19′34″E
- Carries: Yichang-Fuling High-Speed Railway; Highway
- Crosses: Yangtze River
- Locale: Yichang, Hubei, China
- Preceded by: Yichang Yangtze River Railway Bridge
- Followed by: Wujiagang Yangtze River Bridge

Characteristics
- Design: 2 levels cable-stayed bridge
- Material: Steel, concrete
- Total length: 2,782 m (9,127 ft)
- Height: 246.5 m (809 ft)
- Longest span: 800 m (2,600 ft)

History
- Construction start: 10 February 2025
- Opened: December 2030 (planned)

Location
- Interactive map of Xiazhou Yangtze River Rail-Road Bridge

The Xiazhou Yangtze River Rail-Road Bridge (Chinese: 峡州长江公铁大桥) is an under construction bridge over the Yangtze River in Yichang, Hubei, China. The bridge is one of the longest two-level cable-stayed bridge in the world.

The bridge is parallel to the Yichang Yangtze River Railway Bridge that supports the Yichang–Wanzhou railway, the distance between the two bridges' center lines is 56.5 metres (185 ft) (the net distance is 22 metres (72 ft)). The bridge site is located 4.6 kilometres (2.9 mi) downstream of the Yiling Yangtze River Bridge and 5.4 kilometres (3.4 mi) upstream of the Wujiagang Yangtze River Bridge.

== See also ==
- Fuling Yangtze River Rail-Road Bridge
- Bridges and tunnels across the Yangtze River
- List of bridges in China
- List of longest cable-stayed bridge spans
- List of tallest bridges
