= Fuling North railway station =

Railway station in Chongqing, China

Fuling North 涪陵北
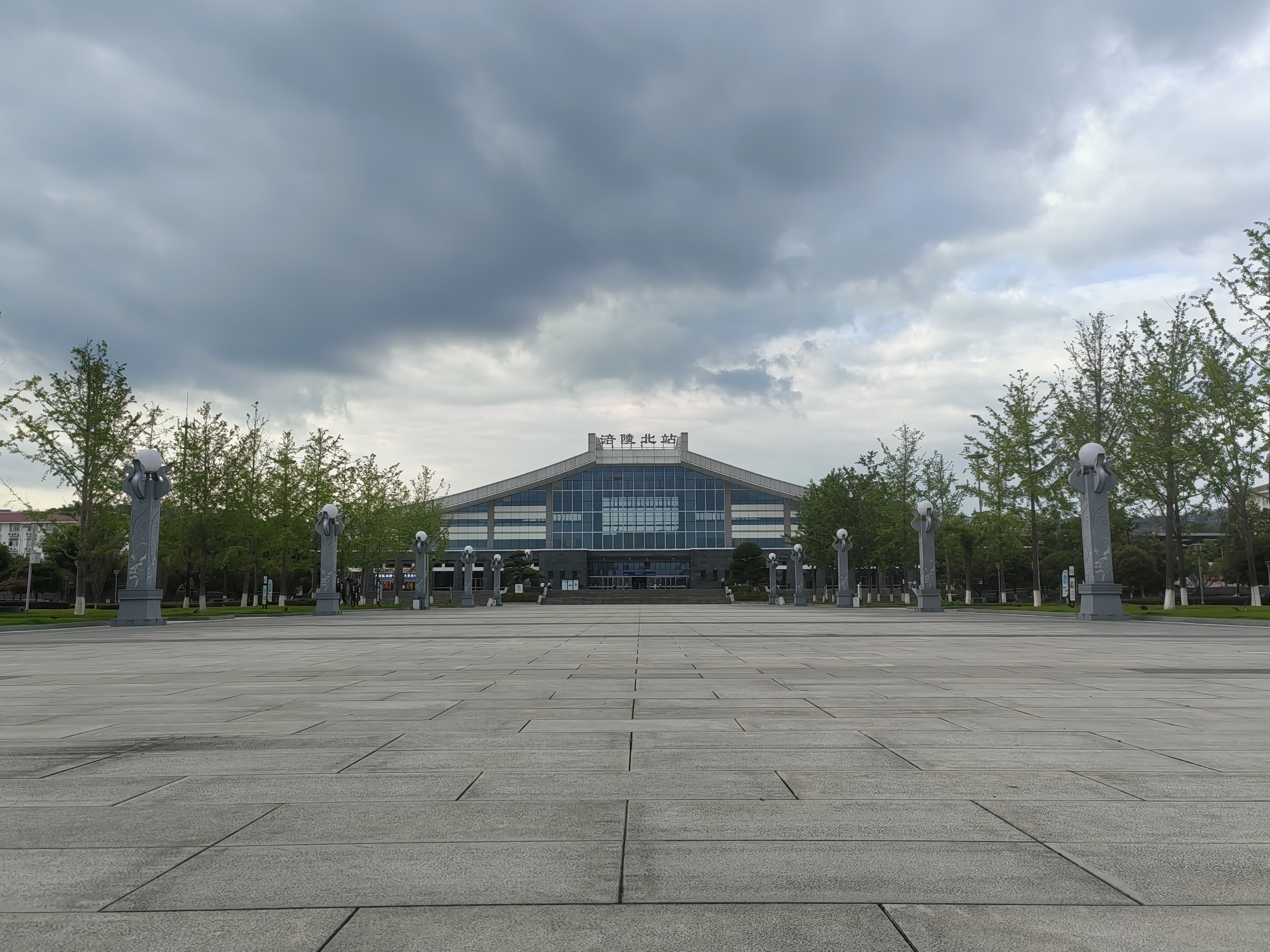

General information
- Other names: Fulingbei
- Location: Fuling District, Chongqing; China
- Coordinates: 29°46′24.47″N 107°16′24.68″E
- Operated by: China Railway Corporation
- Line: Yuli Railway

History
- Opened: 2013; 13 years ago
Location

Fuling North railway station is a railway station located in Fuling District, Chongqing, People's Republic of China, on the Yuli Railway which operated by China Railway Corporation. It opened in 2013.

== Future ==
The railway station will be served by the Chongqing–Wanzhou high-speed railway which is expected to open in 2025.

Preceding station	China Railway High-speed	Following station
Changshou North towards Chongqing North	Chongqing–Lichuan railway	Fengdu towards Lichuan
Chongqing East Terminus	Chongqing–Wanzhou high-speed railway	Fengdu North towards Wanzhou North
