= Second Fengdu Yangtze River Bridge =

Second Fengdu Yangtze River Bridge 豐都長江二橋
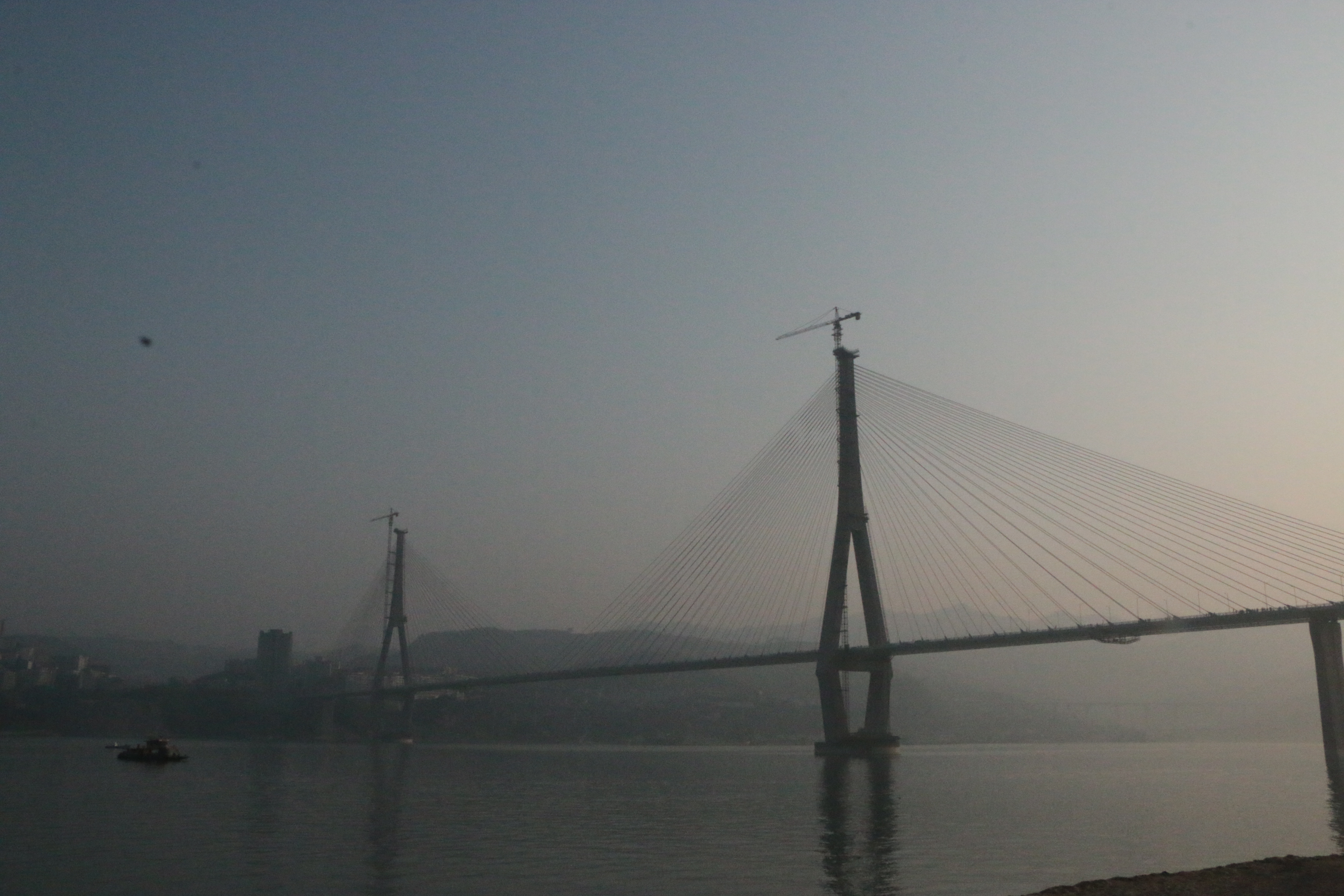
- The bridge under construction
- Coordinates: 29°52′05″N 107°42′28″E
- Carries: China National Highway 348
- Crosses: Yangtze River
- Locale: Fengdu County, Chongqing, China
- Preceded by: Fengdu Yangtze River Bridge
- Followed by: Zhongzhou Yangtze River Bridge

Characteristics
- Design: Cable-stayed bridge
- Material: Steel, concrete
- Total length: 1,466 m (4,810 ft)
- Width: 24.5 m (80 ft)
- Height: 227.1 m (745 ft)
- Longest span: 680 m (2,230 ft)
- Clearance below: 90 m (300 ft)
- No. of lanes: 4

History
- Constructed by: China Communications Construction Company
- Construction start: November 2010
- Opened: 24 January 2017

Location
- Interactive map of Second Fengdu Yangtze River Bridge

The Second Fengdu Yangtze River Bridge (Chinese: 豐都長江二橋) is a bridge over the Yangtze River in Fengdu County, Chongqing, China. It was opened to traffic on 24 January 2017.

On October 12, 2013, an accident on the construction site led to the death of 11 people.

== See also ==
- Bridges and tunnels across the Yangtze River
- List of bridges in China
- List of longest cable-stayed bridge spans
- List of tallest bridges
