= 利川 =

利川 may refer to:

- Icheon (이천), Gyeonggi, South Korea
- Japanese surname
  - Hiromi Toshikawa (利川 裕美; born 1976), known as Hiromix, Japanese photographer and artist
- Lichuan, Hubei, China

== See also ==
- The dictionary definition of 利 at Wiktionary
- The dictionary definition of 川 at Wiktionary
- Lichuan (disambiguation)
