= Fuling Yangtze River Rail-Road Bridge =

Fuling Yangtze River Rail-Road Bridge 涪陵长江公铁大桥
- Coordinates: 29°48′54″N 107°28′29″E
- Carries: Yichang-Fuling High-Speed Railway; Fuling North Ring Expressway
- Crosses: Yangtze River
- Locale: Fuling, Chongqing, China
- Preceded by: Hanjiatuo Yangtze River Bridge
- Followed by: Fengdu Yangtze River Bridge

Characteristics
- Design: Cable-stayed bridge
- Material: Steel, concrete
- Total length: 1,842 m (6,043 ft)
- Height: 292 m (958 ft)
- Longest span: 736 m (2,415 ft)

History
- Construction start: 3 April 2025
- Construction end: 2030 (planned)

Location
- Interactive map of Fuling Yangtze River Rail-Road Bridge

The Fuling Yangtze River Rail-Road Bridge (Chinese: 涪陵长江公铁大桥) is a bridge being constructed over the Yangtze River in Fuling, Chongqing, China. The bridge is one of the longest and tallest cable-stayed bridges in the world.

== See also ==
- Xiazhou Yangtze River Rail-Road Bridge
- Bridges and tunnels across the Yangtze River
- List of bridges in China
- List of longest cable-stayed bridge spans
- List of tallest bridges
