= Enshi railway station =

Railway station in Enshi City, China

Enshi railway station 恩施站
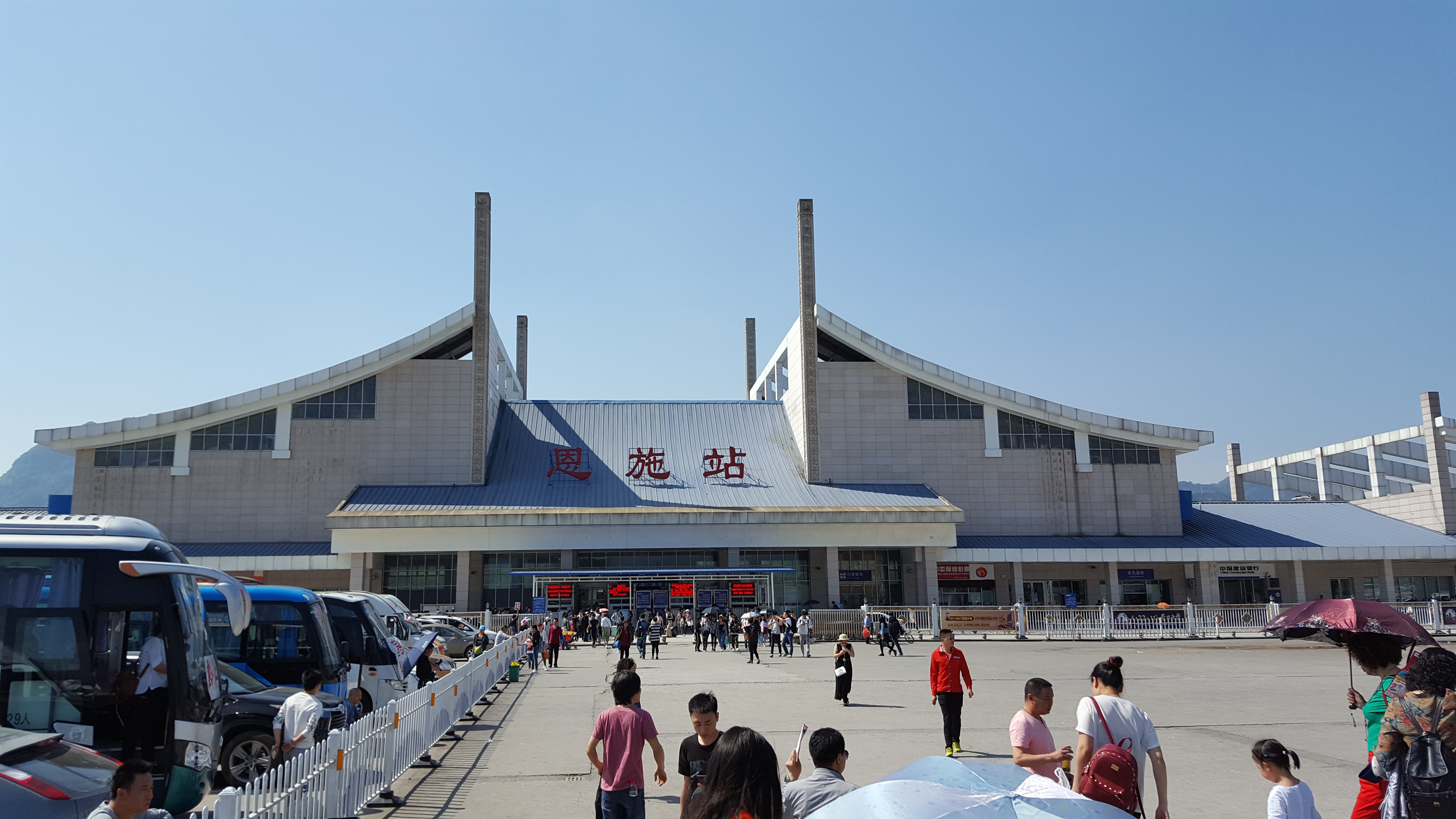

General information
- Location: Enshi City, Enshi Tujia and Miao Autonomous Prefecture, Hubei Province; China
- Coordinates: 30°21′4.50″N 109°28′47.50″E
- Operated by: China Railway Wuhan Group, China Railway Corporation
- Lines: Yiwan Railway; Enshi–Jishou railway (planned)

History
- Opened: 22 December 2012; 12 years ago
Location

Enshi railway station (Chinese: 恩施站), is a railway station in Enshi City, Enshi Tujia and Miao Autonomous Prefecture, Hubei Province, People's Republic of China. It is part of the Yichang–Wanzhou railway.

On 22 December 2012, the Yichang–Wanzhou railway started operations, with the maiden journey from Enshi railway station to Yichang city.

The station is close to Enshi Xujiaping Airport, but is not connected.

Preceding station	China Railway High-speed	Following station
Jianshi towards Yichang East	Yichang–Wanzhou railway	Lichuan towards Wanzhou
