= Shizhuxian railway station =

Railway station in Chongqing, China

Shizhuxian 石柱县

General information
- Location: Shizhu County, Chongqing; China
- Coordinates: 29.9677°N 108.0929°E
- Operated by: China Railway Corporation
- Line: Yuli Railway

History
- Opened: 28 December 2013; 12 years ago
Location

Shizhuxian station (石柱县站), also translated as Shizhu County station, is a railway station in Shizhu County, Chongqing, People's Republic of China, on the Yuli Railway operated by the China Railway Corporation. The station opened for operation on December 28, 2013.

On November 10, 2016, Shizhuxian railway station started offering special guest services, including an expanded passenger waiting area (98 square metres (1,050 sq ft)), with personalised services including a library corner, a breastfeeding area, and a children's play area.

Since Huangshui railway station opened for passenger service on December 31, 2022, Shizhu County is now considered a "dual station" area. Tourists traveling by train to visit Huangshui no longer need to transfer to a bus at Shizhuxian station, which is approximately 70 kilometres (43 mi) from the main tourist area.

Preceding station	China Railway High-speed	Following station
Fengdu towards Chongqing North	Chongqing–Lichuan railway	Shaziguan towards Lichuan
