= Jianshi railway station =

Railway station in Hubei, China

Jianshi railway station 建始
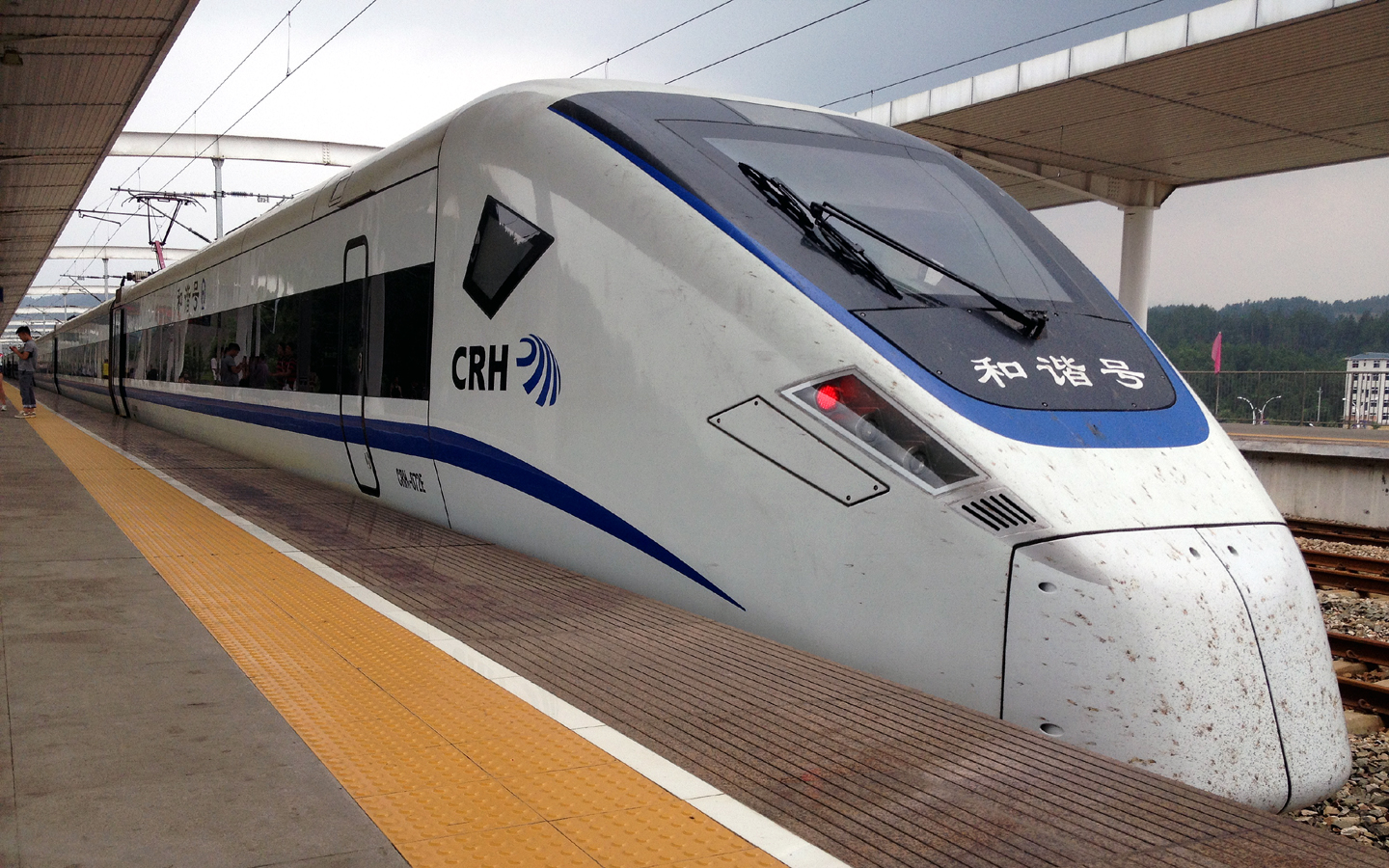
- CRH1 electric EMU stops at Jianshi Station of Yiwan Railway

General information
- Location: Jianshi County, Hubei; China
- Coordinates: 30.5698°N 109.7234°E
- Operated by: China Railway Corporation
- Line: Yiwan Railway
Location

Jianshi railway station is a railway station located in Hubei Province, People's Republic of China, on the Yiwan Railway which is operated by China Railway Corporation.

Preceding station	China Railway High-speed	Following station
Gaoping towards Yichang East	Yichang–Wanzhou railway	Enshi towards Wanzhou
