= Tenglong Cave =

Cave in Hubei, China

Coordinates: 30°20′11″N 108°58′58″E

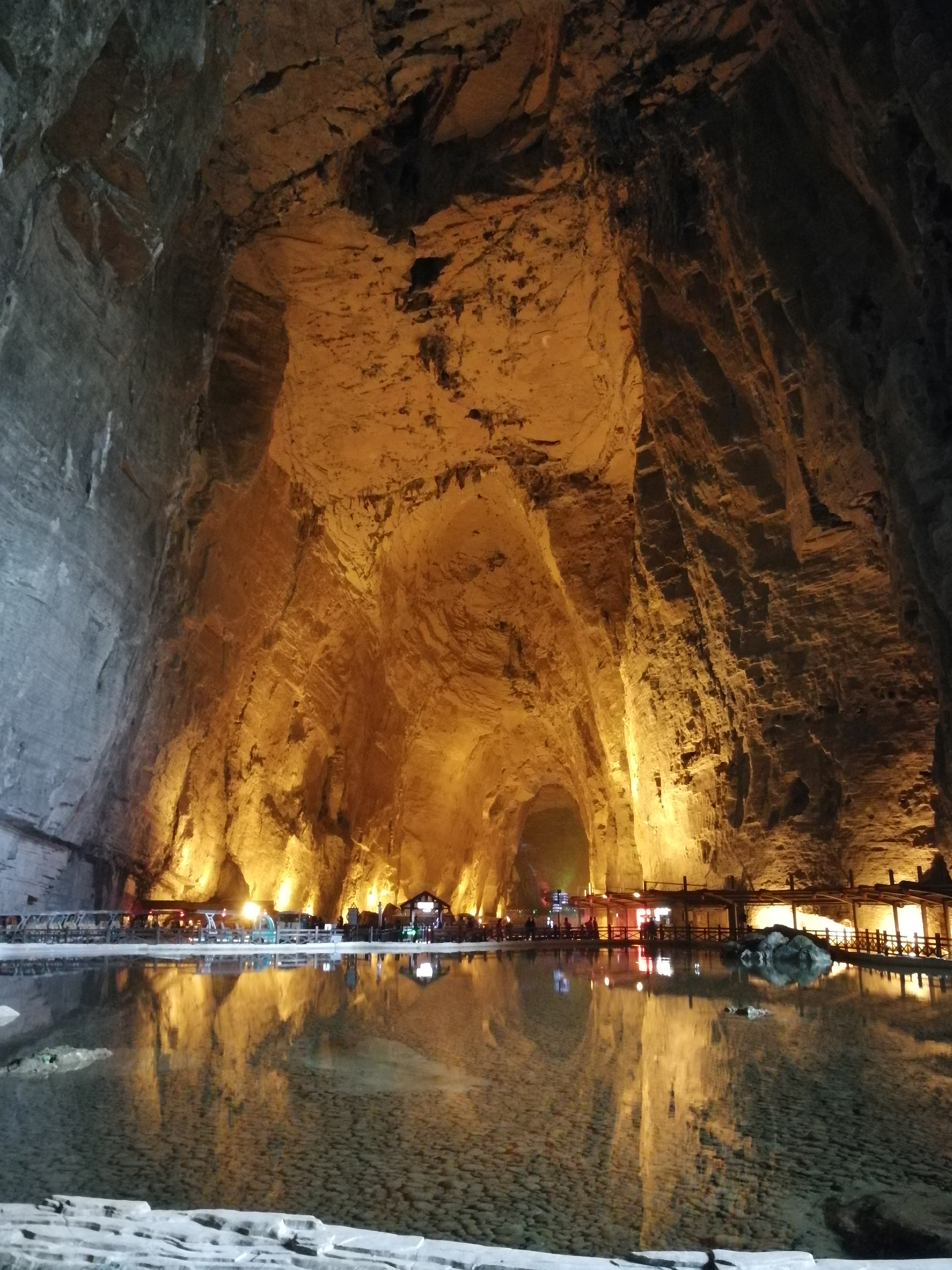
- Inner view of Tenglong Cave
- Interactive map of Tenglong Cave
- Location: Lichuan, Hubei, China
- Length: 52,800 metres (173,200 ft)

Tenglong Cave (Chinese: 腾龙洞; lit. 'soaring dragon cave') is a cave located 6.8 km (4.2 mi) from Lichuan City, Hubei, China. It is believed to be the longest monomer karst cave system in the world. The cave entrance is 74 m (243 ft) and 64 m (210 ft) wide, leading to 59.8 km (37.2 mi) of passageways. An underground network of streams runs for 16.8 km (10.4 mi) whilst the cave is the source of the Qingjiang River. Year round temperatures underground remain in the 16–18 degrees Celsius range.

To facilitate tourist access to the cave, as well as to the so-called Enshi Grand Canyon Scenic Area (恩施大峡谷景区), the prefectural authorities are considering plans for the construction of a tourist railway, which will link these two popular tourist attractions with a station on the Yichang−Wanzhou Railway (probably, Lichuan).

== See also ==
- List of caves in China
- List of longest caves
