= Lichuan =

Lichuan may refer to the following locations:

- Lichuan, Hubei (利川市), county-level city of the Enshi Tujia and Miao Autonomous Prefecture, Hubei
  - Lichuan railway station (利川站)
- Lichuan County (黎川县), Fuzhou, Jiangxi
- Lichuan, Shanxi (犁川镇), town in and subdivision of Zezhou County, Shanxi

== See also ==
- Li Chuan Yun (1980–), violinist
