= Enshi–Jishou railway =

Planned railway line in China

The Enshi–Jishou railway is a planned railway line in China.

== History ==
In March and April 2022, preliminary meetings took place.

== Specification ==
The line will run south from Enshi railway station on the Yichang–Wanzhou railway to Jishou railway station on the Jiaozuo–Liuzhou railway. It is expected to be a general speed railway not exceeding 200 kilometres per hour (120 mph).
