= Wanzhou Railway Bridge =

Yiwan Railway Wanzhou Yangtze River Bridge 宜万铁路万州长江大桥
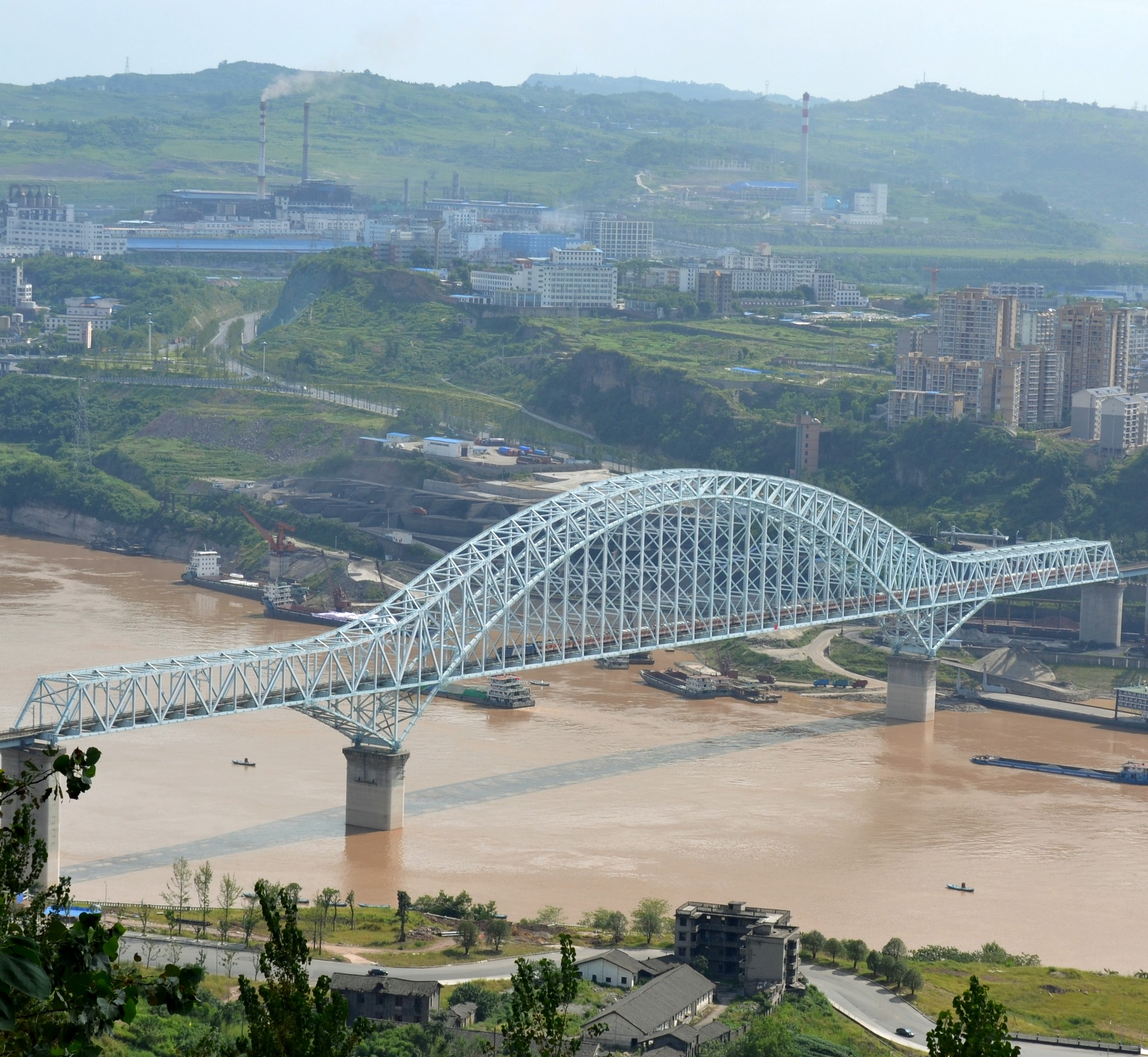
- Coordinates: 30.769778°N 108.416528°E
- Carries: Yichang−Wanzhou Railway
- Crosses: Yangtze River
- Locale: Wanzhou, Chongqing, China

Characteristics
- Design: Arch Bridge
- Material: Steel
- Total length: 1,106 metres (3,629 ft)
- Longest span: 360 metres (1,180 ft)

History
- Construction start: 3 December 2002
- Opened: 2005

Location
- Interactive map of Yiwan Railway Wanzhou Yangtze River Bridge

The Yiwan Railway Wanzhou Yangtze River Bridge is an arch bridge in Wanzhou District, Chongqing, China. The bridge was completed in 2005 and carries the Yichang−Wanzhou Railway across the Yangtze River. The bridge spans 360 metres (1,180 ft) making it one of the longest arch bridges in the world.

== See also ==
- List of longest arch bridge spans
- Yangtze River bridges and tunnels
