= Zhonglu =

Zhonglu 忠路镇 Chunglu
- Town
- Location in Hubei
- Coordinates: 30°01′22″N 108°43′18″E
- Country: People's Republic of China
- Province: Hubei
- Prefecture: Enshi
- County-level city: Lichuan
- Village-level divisions: 1 residential community 60 villages
- Elevation: 626 m (2,054 ft)

Population (2010)
  - Total: 59,539
- Time zone: UTC+8 (China Standard)

Zhonglu (Chinese: 忠路; pinyin: Zhōnglù) is a town in the Enshi Tujia and Miao Autonomous Prefecture, in extreme southwestern Hubei province, China, 36 kilometres (22 mi) southwest of downtown Lichuan, which administers the town, and 78 km (48 mi) west-southwest of Enshi City, the prefectural seat. As of 2011, it has one residential community (社区) and 60 villages under its administration.

== Administrative Divisions ==
One residential community:

- Longqu (龙渠居委会)

Sixty villages:

- Honghua, Fanshen, Chatai, Hexin, Qilong, Shuangmiao, Guihua, Zonghe, Tianwan, Hongsha, Zhuba, Zhongling, Nongke, Xiaping, Xiaohe, Gongqiao, Yangjiapo, Xiangyang, Paomu, Xiaoping, Huilong, Dongfeng, Xiaba, Fengle, Shipan, Basheng, Longtang, Zhaipo, Muba, Jinyan, Xilin, Ganxi, Xinjian, Huangla, Fenghuang, Xinglong, Chengchi, Pianqian, Taiping, Jiangyuan, Shaping, Hujiatang, Heilin, Lizhi, Mitanxi, Laowuji, Heli, Hongling, Pingxing, Jinxiu, Liangfeng, Shuanghe, Qingping, Chenggan, Yongxing, Lishan, Minzhu, Chayuan, Shuangzhai, Jinyin

== See also ==
- List of township-level divisions of Hubei
