= Wuping, Chongqing =

Wuping 武平镇
- Town
- Location in Chongqing
- Coordinates: 29.7963°N 108.0855°E
- Country: People's Republic of China
- Direct-Administered Municipality: Chongqing
- County: Fengdu County
- Time zone: UTC+8 (China Standard)

Wuping (Chinese: 武平) is a town of Fengdu County, Chongqing, China. As of 2018, it has 2 residential communities and 8 villages under its administration.

== See also ==
- List of township-level divisions of Chongqing
