= Sanhe Subdistrict, Fengdu County =

Sanhe Subdistrict 三合街道
- Subdistrict
- Location in Chongqing
- Coordinates: 29.8668°N 107.7309°E
- Country: People's Republic of China
- Direct-administered municipality: Chongqing
- County: Fengdu County
- Time zone: UTC+8 (China Standard)

Sanhe Subdistrict (Chinese: 三合街道; pinyin: Sānhé Jiēdào) is a subdistrict in Fengdu County, Chongqing, China. As of 2018, it has 16 residential communities and 7 villages under its administration.

== See also ==
- List of township-level divisions of Chongqing
