= Yichang Yangtze River Railway Bridge =

Yichang Railway Bridge 宜昌長江鐵路大橋
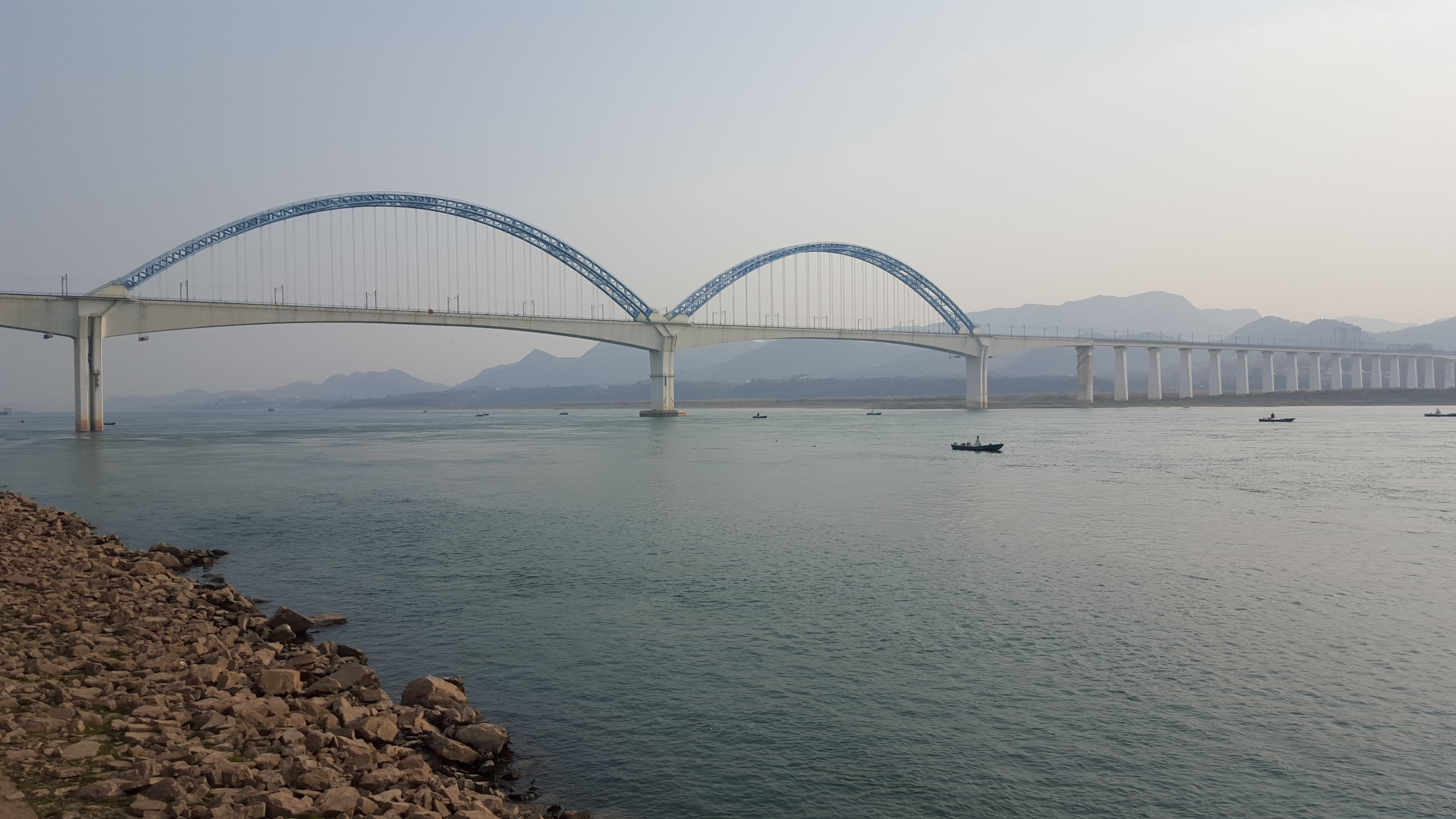
- Coordinates: 30.655944°N 111.325583°E
- Carries: Yichang−Wanzhou Railway
- Crosses: Yangtze River
- Locale: Wujiagang District, Hubei, China

Characteristics
- Design: Arch Bridge
- Total length: 2,518.71 metres (8,263.5 ft)
- Longest span: 275 metres (902 ft) (x2)
- Clearance above: 51.58 metres (169.2 ft)

History
- Construction start: 3 December 2002
- Opened: 2008

Location
- Interactive map of Yichang Railway Bridge

The Yichang Yangtze River Railway Bridge is an arch bridge in Yichang, Hubei, China. The bridge was completed in 2008 and carries the Yichang−Wanzhou Railway across the Yangtze River. The bridge has two main spans of 275 metres (902 ft) each.

== See also ==
- Yangtze River bridges and tunnels
