= Wujiagang Yangtze River Bridge =

Wujiagang Yangtze River Bridge 伍家岗长江大桥
- Coordinates: 30°37′03″N 111°21′36″E
- Carries: Expressway
- Crosses: Yangtze river
- Locale: Yichang, Hubei, China

Characteristics
- Design: Suspension
- Material: Steel, concrete
- Width: 34.7 m (114 ft)
- Height: 157 m (515 ft)
- Longest span: 1,160 m (3,810 ft)
- No. of lanes: 6

History
- Construction start: April 2017
- Construction end: 2 August 2021

Location
- Interactive map of Wujiagang Yangtze River Bridge

The Wujiagang Yangtze River Bridge (Chinese: 伍家岗长江大桥) is a suspension bridge over the Yangtze river in Yichang, China. The bridge is one of the longest suspension bridges with a main span of 1,160 m (3,810 ft).

== See also ==
- Bridges and tunnels across the Yangtze River
- List of bridges in China
- List of longest suspension bridge spans
