= Hanjiatuo Yangtze River Bridge =

Hanjiatuo Yangtze River Bridge 韩家沱长江大桥
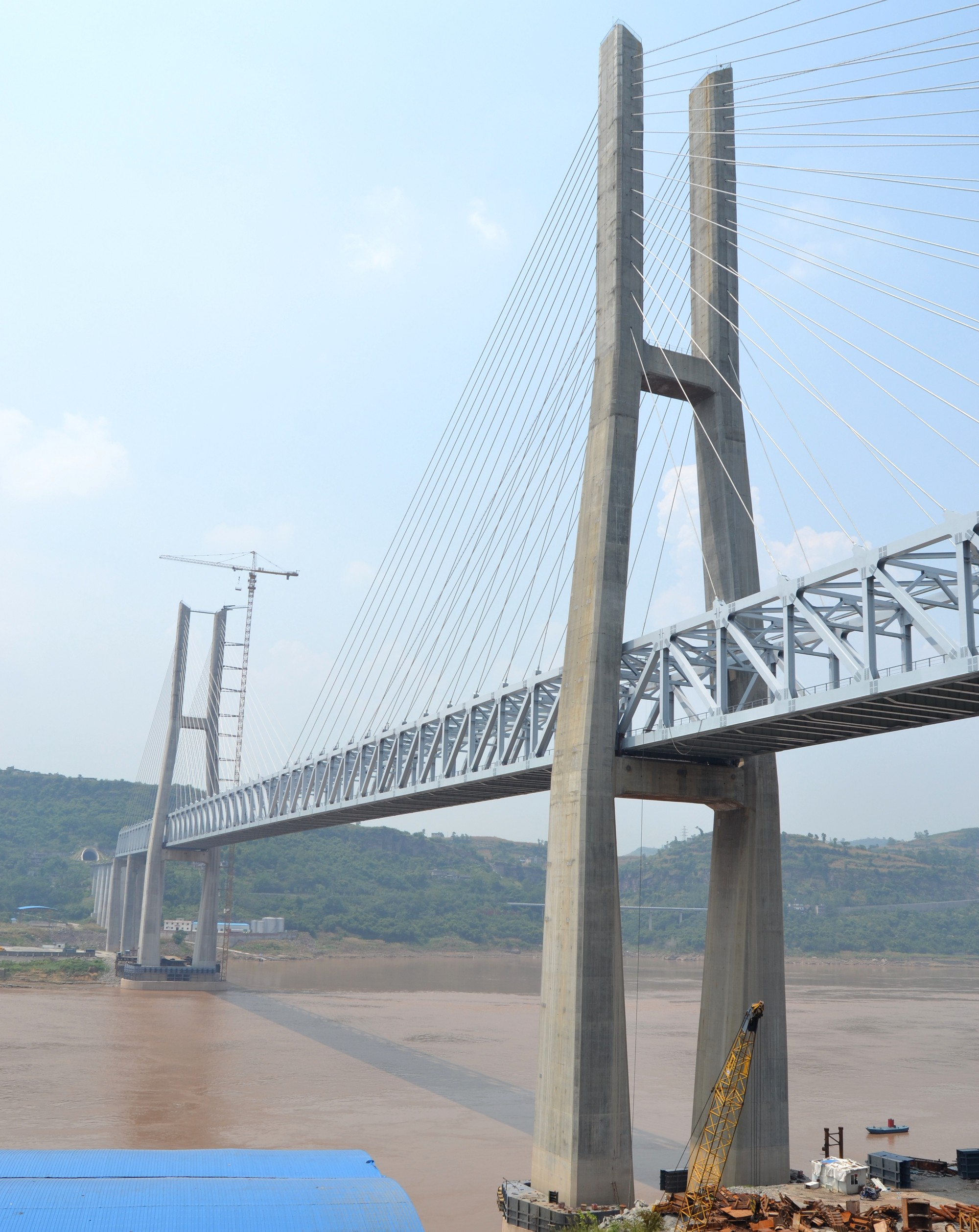
- Coordinates: 29.767694°N 107.417278°E
- Carries: Chongqing−Lichuan Railway
- Crosses: Yangtze River
- Locale: Fuling, Chongqing, China
- Other name: Tan Yujiatuo Bridge

Characteristics
- Design: Cable-stayed
- Material: Steel/concrete
- Total length: 1,137 metres (3,730 ft)
- Longest span: 432 metres (1,417 ft)

History
- Construction end: 2012

Location
- Interactive map of Hanjiatuo Yangtze River Bridge

The Hanjiatuo Yangtze River Bridge is a cable-stayed railway bridge over the Yangtze River in the Fuling District of Chongqing, China. The bridge carries the Chongqing-Lichuan Railway and was completed in 2012.

The Hanjiatuo Bridge has two towers 184 metres (604 ft) and 179 metres (587 ft) in height. The total bridge is 1,137.5 metres (3,732 ft) including a longest span of 432 metres (1,417 ft). The bridge ranks among the longest cable-stayed bridges in the world.

== See also ==
- List of largest cable-stayed bridges
- Yangtze River bridges and tunnels
