= Fengdu Yangtze River Bridge =

Fengdu Yangtze River Bridge 丰都长江大桥
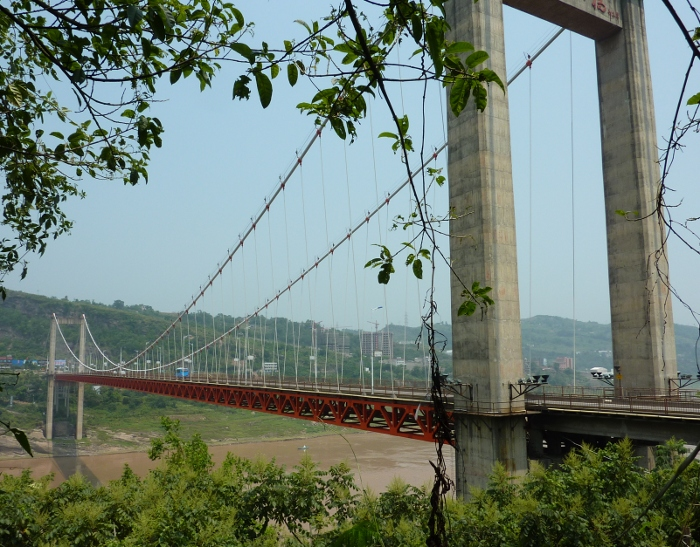
- Coordinates: 29.855417°N 107.669722°E
- Crosses: Yangtze River
- Locale: Wushan, Chongqing, China

Characteristics
- Design: Suspension
- Material: Steel/concrete
- Total length: 620 metres (2,030 ft)
- Longest span: 450 metres (1,480 ft)

History
- Opened: 1997

Location
- Interactive map of Fengdu Yangtze River Bridge

Fengdu Yangtze River Bridge
- Traditional Chinese: 豐都大橋
- Simplified Chinese: 丰都大桥
Transcriptions
Standard Mandarin
- Hanyu Pinyin: Fēngdū Dàqiáo

The Fengdu Yangtze River Bridge is a suspension bridge which crosses the Yangtze River in Fengdu County, Chongqing, China. Completed in 1996, it has a main span of 450 metres (1,480 ft) placing it among the longest suspension bridges in the world.

== See also ==
- List of longest suspension bridge spans
- Yangtze River bridges and tunnels
