= Wanzhou railway station =

Railway station in Chongqing, China

Wanzhou 万州
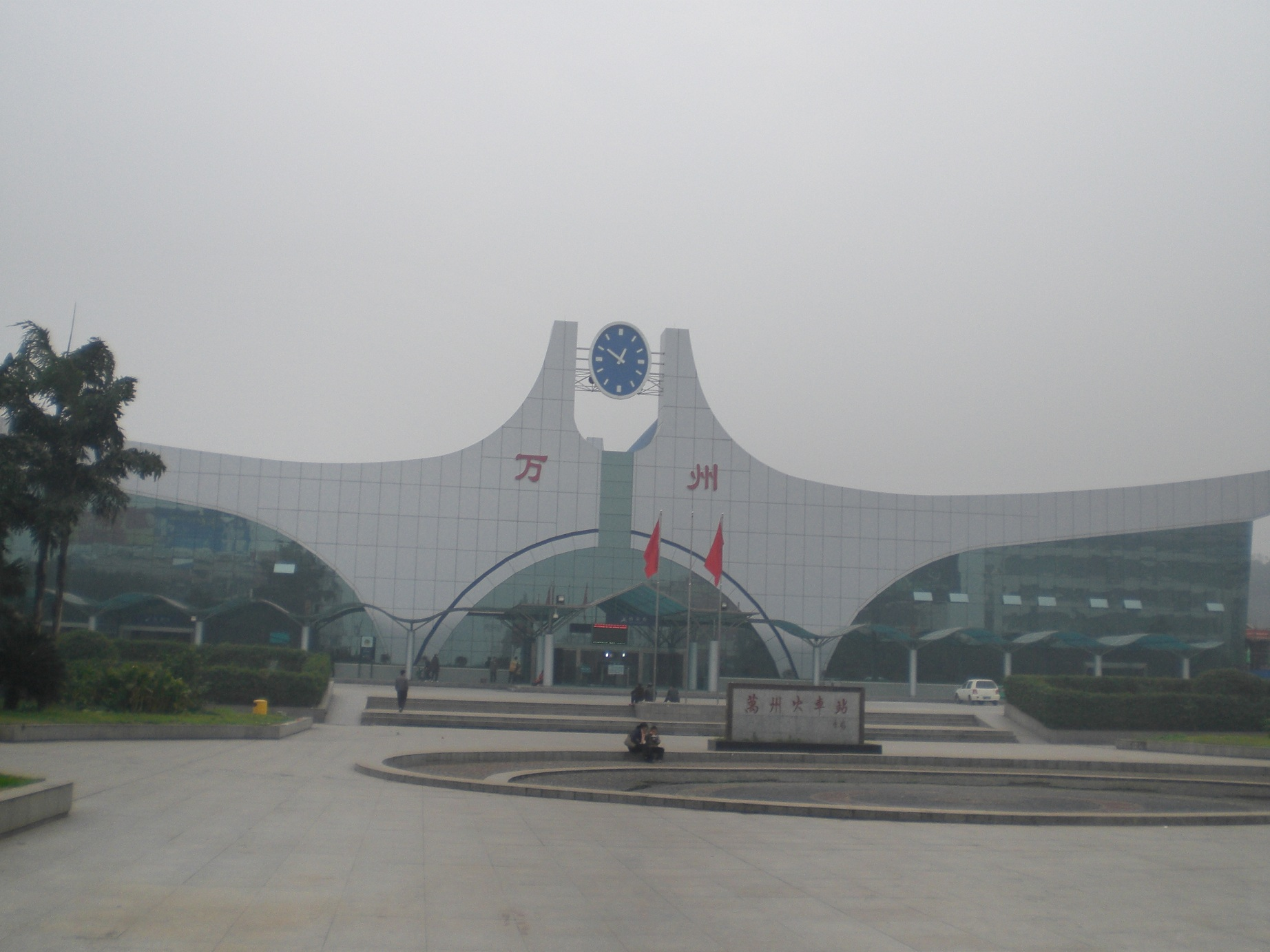

General information
- Location: Wanzhou District, Chongqing; China
- Coordinates: 30°51′55″N 108°21′43″E
- Operated by: China Railway Corporation
- Line: Yichang–Wanzhou railway
Location

Wanzhou railway station is the western terminus of the Yichang–Wanzhou railway in Wanzhou District, Chongqing. This is a branch off the Shanghai–Wuhan–Chengdu High-Speed Railway, with most services divert south to Chongqing on the Yuli Railway at Lichuan. High-speed rail services are available to eastern destinations in neighbouring Hebei province and beyond. Major destinations being Wuhan and Yichang. Conventional rail connections extend to the west, to Dazhou and beyond to Chengdu and other Sichuan cities via the Dacheng Railway and Chongqing via the Xiangyu Railway. The station was opened to high-speed traffic on December 22, 2010.

Preceding station	China Railway High-speed	Following station
Wuqiao towards Yichang East	Yichang–Wanzhou railway	Terminus
