= Fengdu County =

Coordinates: 29.8961°N 107.734°E

Fengdu 丰都县 Fengtu
- County
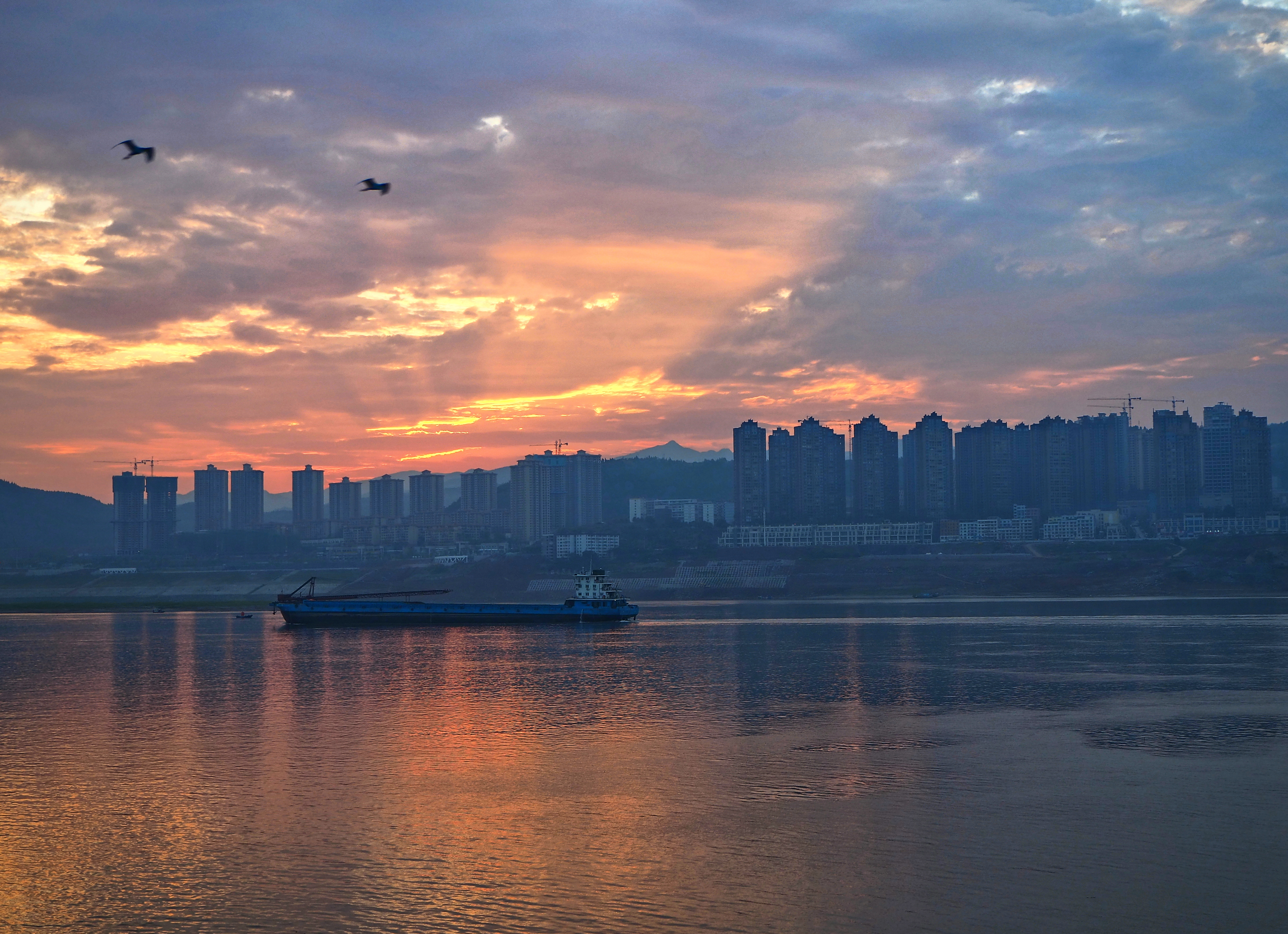
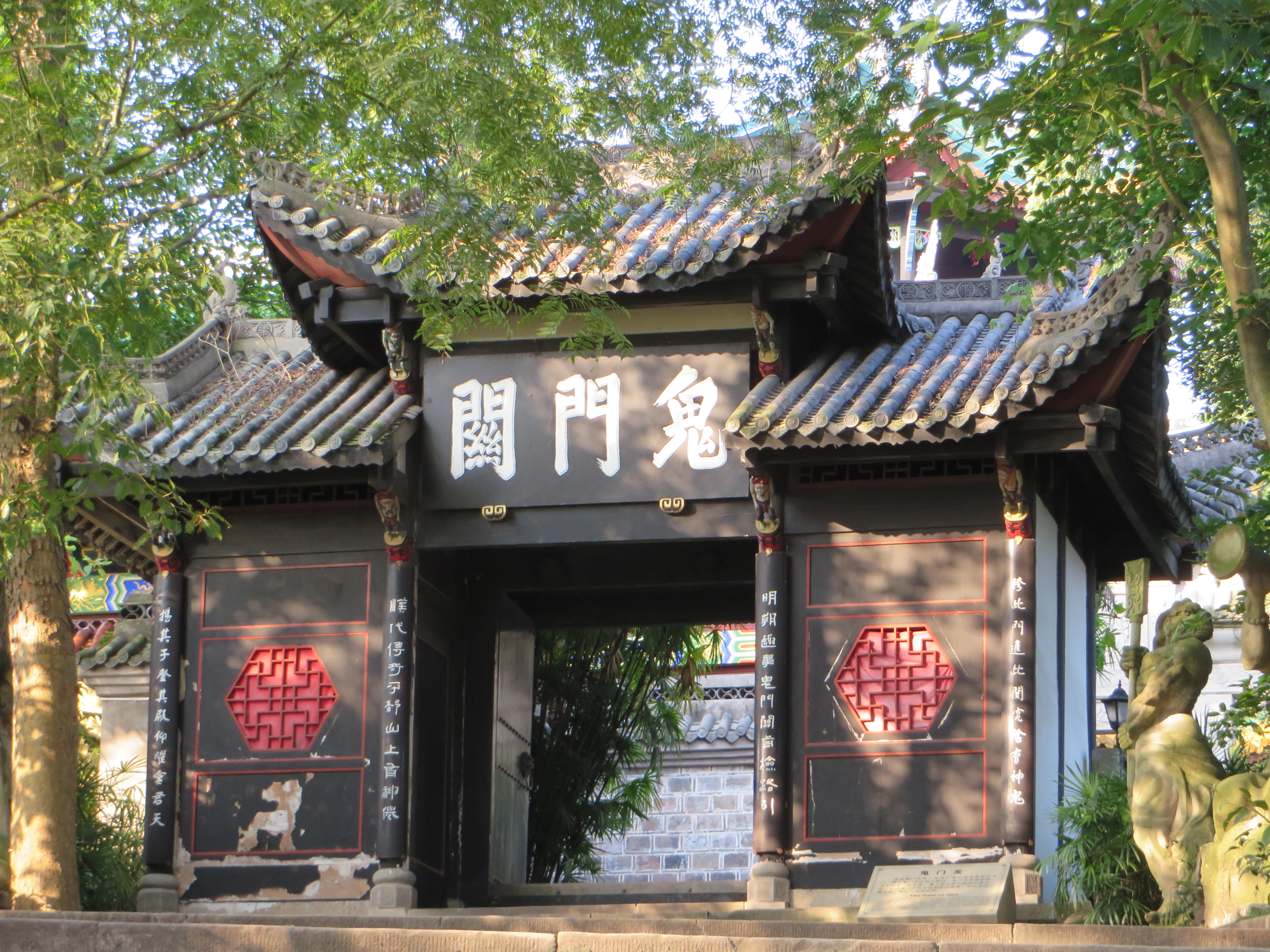
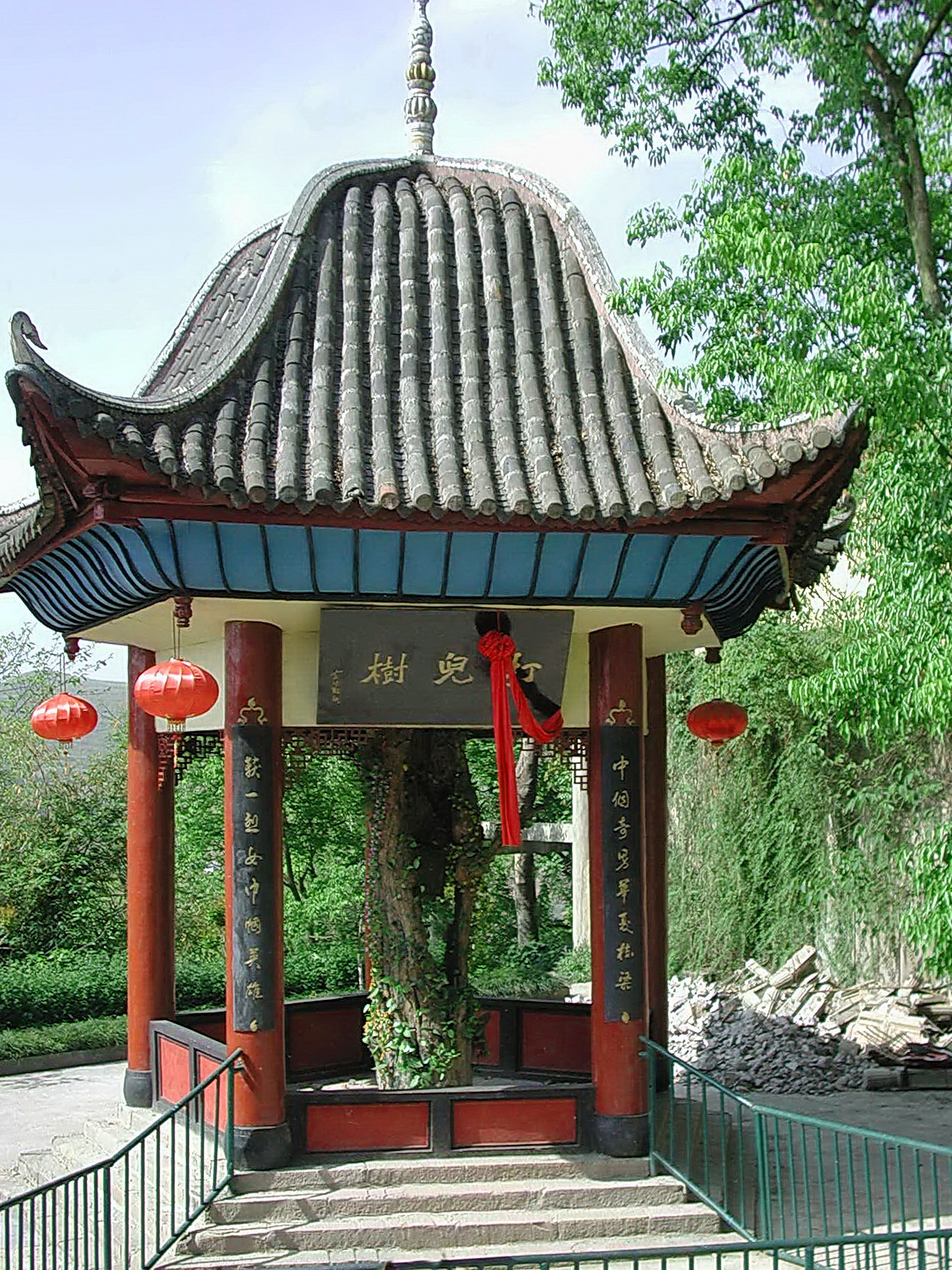
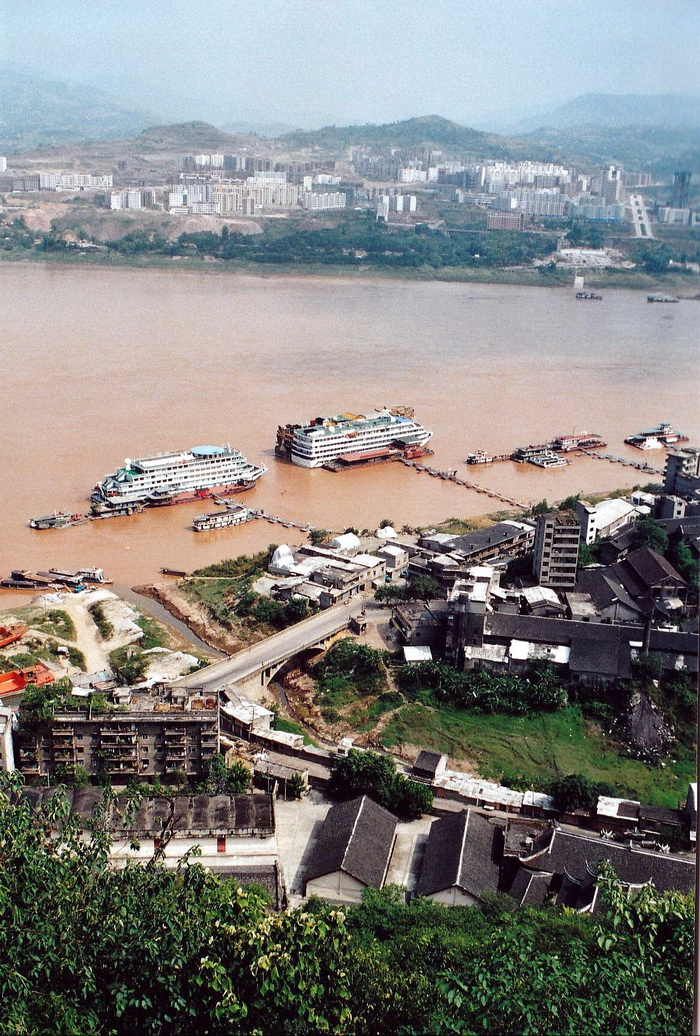
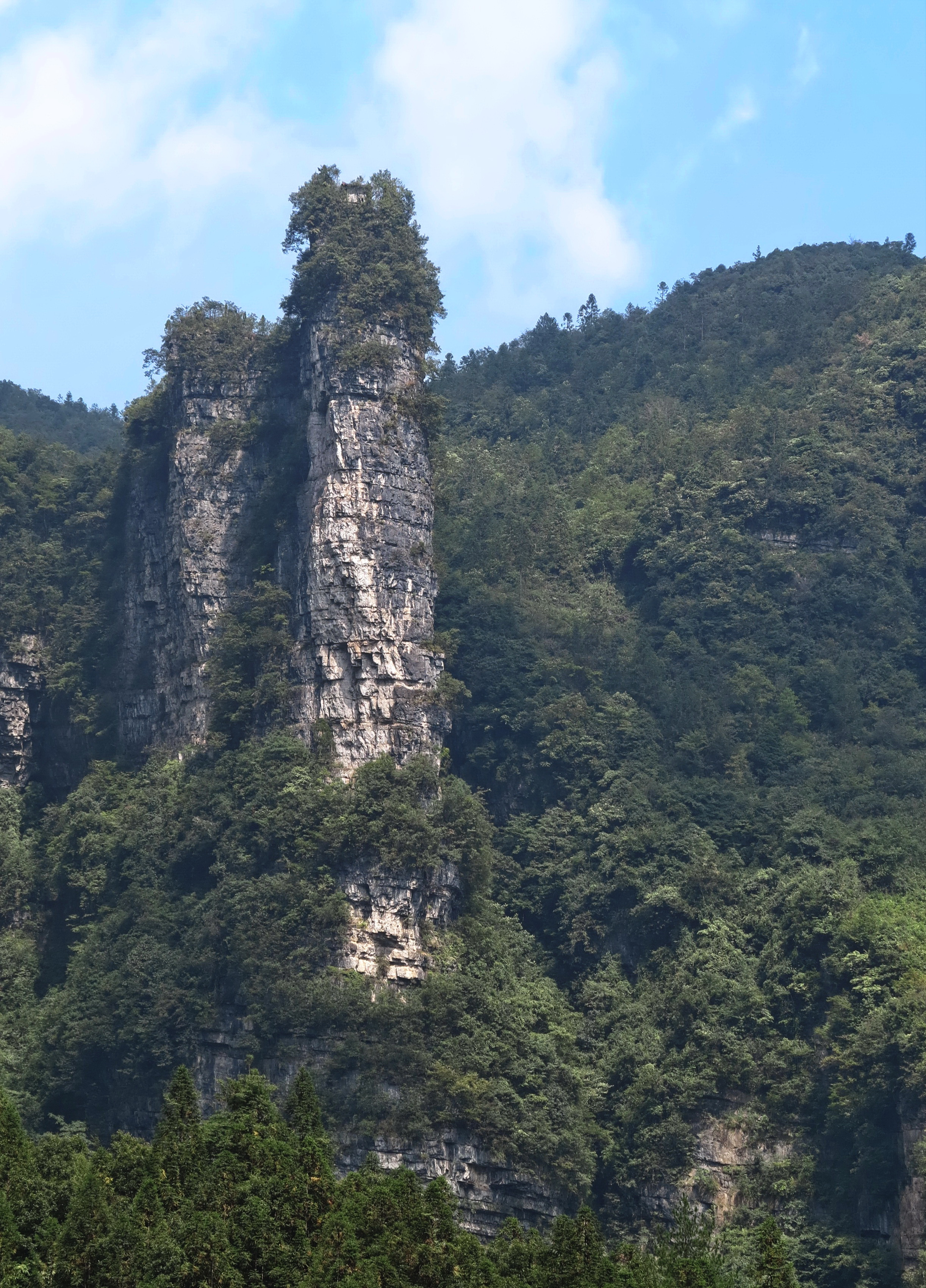
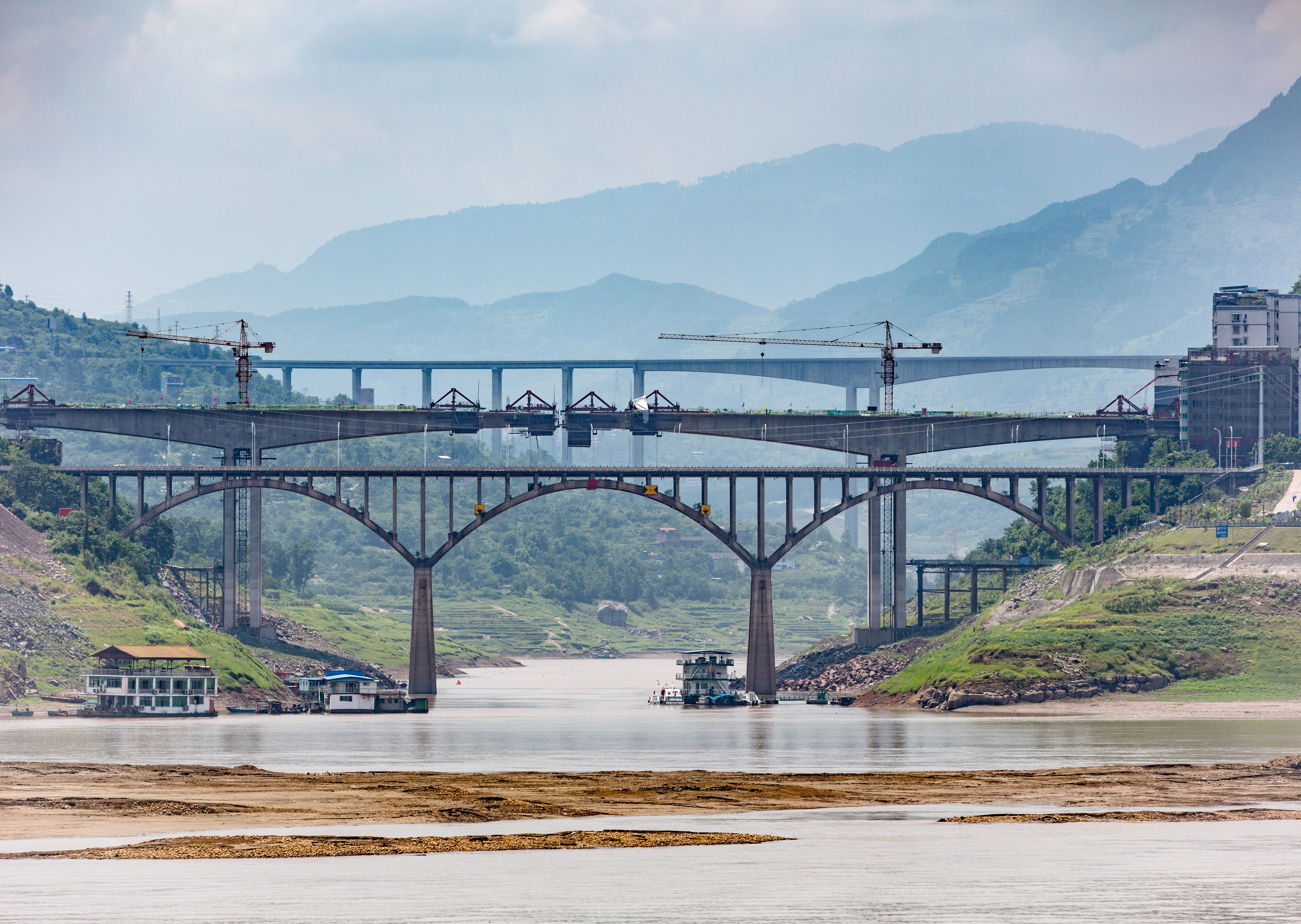
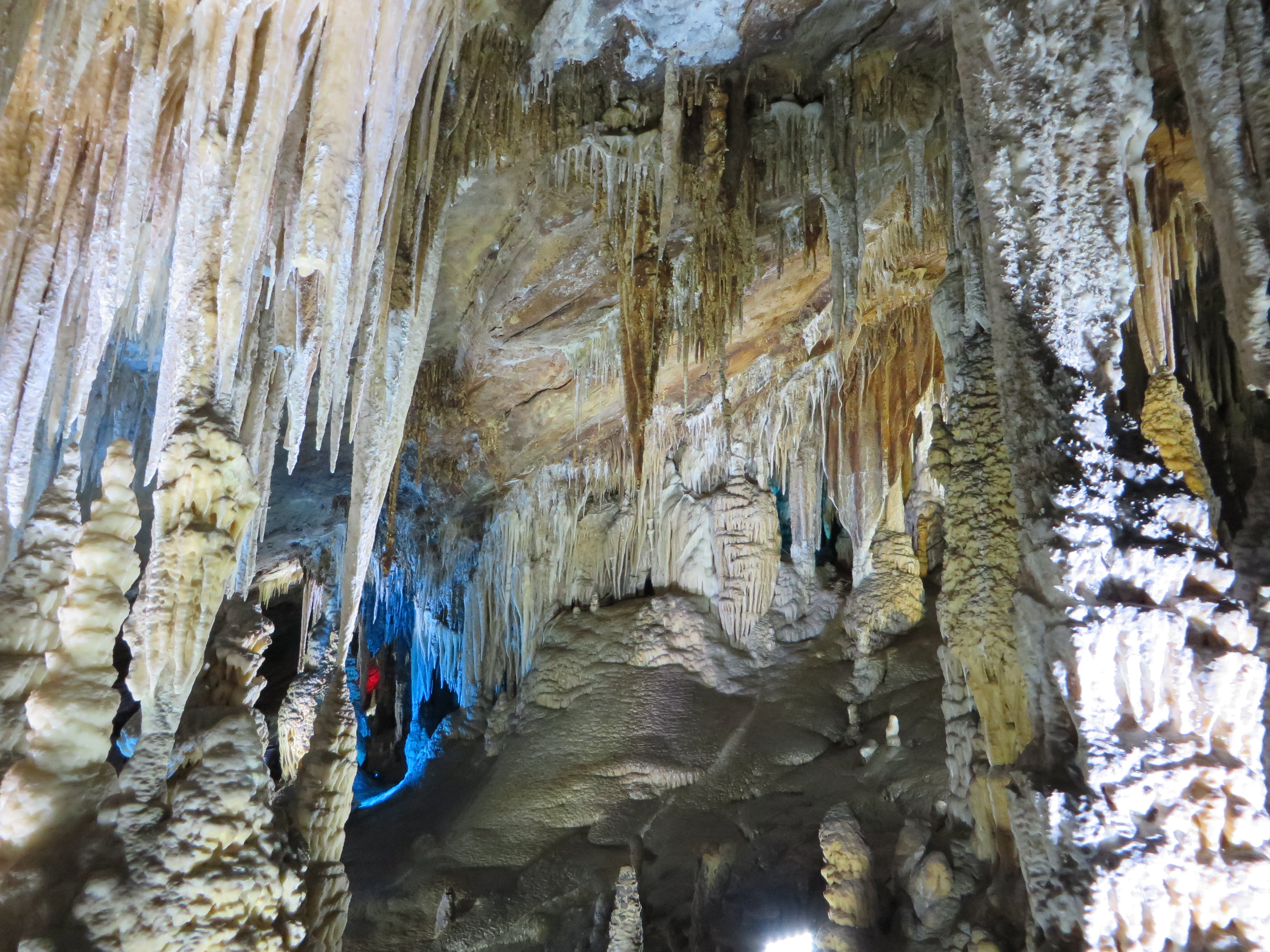
- Fengdu Skyline Ghost City Ghost-Beating Tree Float on the Yangtze Dudu Village Bridges over the Yangtze Snowy Jade Cave

- Location of Fengdu County in Chongqing
- Interactive map of Fengdu
- Country: People's Republic of China
- Municipality: Chongqing

Area
  - Total: 2,896 km^{2} (1,118 sq mi)

Population (2020 census)
  - Total: 557,374
  - Density: 192.5/km^{2} (498.5/sq mi)
- Time zone: UTC+8 (China Standard)
- Website: 丰都县政府网 (in Simplified Chinese)

Fengdu County
- Simplified Chinese: 丰都县
- Traditional Chinese: 豐都縣
- Postal: Fengtu
Transcriptions
Standard Mandarin
- Hanyu Pinyin: Fēngdū Xiàn

Alternative Chinese name
- Simplified Chinese: 酆都县
- Traditional Chinese: 酆都縣
Transcriptions
Standard Mandarin
- Hanyu Pinyin: Fēngdū Xiàn

Fengdu County (Chinese: 丰都县; pinyin: Fēngdū Xiàn; formerly Chinese: 酆都县; pinyin: Fēngdū Xiàn) is a county located in Chongqing Municipality, People's Republic of China. The county was established as Fengdu County (豐都縣) during the Sui dynasty. The name was changed to Fengdu County (酆都縣) during the Ming dynasty. In 1958, the name was changed back to Fengdu County (simplified Chinese: 丰都县; traditional Chinese: 豐都縣).

== Administration ==
Before changes in 2013, Fengdu County had 2 subdistricts, 21 towns and 7 townships. As of 2016, Fengdu County had 2 subdistricts, 23 towns and 5 townships. As of 2020, Fengdu County has the following 2 subdistricts, 23 towns, and 5 townships:

| NBS Area No. | English name | Chinese (Simp.) | Postal Code |
|---|---|---|---|
Subdistricts
| 500230001000 | Sanhe Subdistrict | 三合街道 | 408233, 408254, 408299, 408254 |
| 500230002000 | Mingshan Subdistrict | 名山街道 | 408201 |
Towns
| 500230101000 | Huwei | 虎威镇 | 408202 |
| 500230102000 | Shetan | 社坛镇 | 408203, 408234, 408235 |
| 500230103000 | Sanyuan | 三元镇 | 408207, 408239 |
| 500230104000 | Xumingsi | 许明寺镇 | 408211, 408240 |
| 500230105000 | Dongjia | 董家镇 | 408212 |
| 500230106000 | Shuren | 树人镇 | 408213, 408243 |
| 500230107000 | Shizhi | 十直镇 | 408214, 408244, 408245 |
| 500230109000 | Gaojia | 高家镇 | 408216 |
| 500230110000 | Xingyi | 兴义镇 | 408219, 408248 |
| 500230111000 | Shuanglu | 双路镇 | 408218, 408247 |
| 500230112000 | Jiangchi | 江池镇 | 408225, 408252 |
| 500230113000 | Longhe | 龙河镇 | 408224, 408250, 408251 |
| 500230114000 | Wuping | 武平镇 | 408266 |
| 500230115000 | Baoluan | 包鸾镇 | 408231, 408253, 408256, 408231 |
| 500230116000 | Zhanpu | 湛普镇 | |
| 500230118000 | Nantianhu | 南天湖镇 | 408223, 408249 |
| 500230119000 | Baohe | 保合镇 | 408206, 408238 |
| 500230120000 | Xinglong | 兴龙镇 | 408204, |
| 500230121000 | Rensha | 仁沙镇 | 408205, 408237 |
| 500230122000 | Longkong | 龙孔镇 | 408217, 408246 |
| 500230123000 | Jilong | 暨龙镇 | |
| 500230124000 | Shuanglong | 双龙镇 | 408208, 408218 |
| 500230125000 | Xiannühu | 仙女湖镇 | 408299, 408255 |
Townships
| 500230202000 | Qinglong Township | 青龙乡 | 408209 |
| 500230206000 | Taipingba Township | 太平坝乡 | 408230 |
| 500230207000 | Dudu Township | 都督乡 | 408228 |
| 500230209000 | Lizi Township | 栗子乡 | 408222 |
| 500230210000 | Sanjian Township | 三建乡 | 408221 |

== Climate ==
Climate data for Fengdu, elevation 291 m (955 ft), (1991–2020 normals, extremes 1981–2010)
| Month | Jan | Feb | Mar | Apr | May | Jun | Jul | Aug | Sep | Oct | Nov | Dec | Year |
|---|---|---|---|---|---|---|---|---|---|---|---|---|---|
| Record high °C (°F) | 18.1 (64.6) | 25.8 (78.4) | 33.8 (92.8) | 36.5 (97.7) | 39.2 (102.6) | 40.3 (104.5) | 41.6 (106.9) | 42.9 (109.2) | 43.3 (109.9) | 36.4 (97.5) | 28.0 (82.4) | 19.3 (66.7) | 43.3 (109.9) |
| Mean daily maximum °C (°F) | 10.3 (50.5) | 13.4 (56.1) | 18.5 (65.3) | 23.8 (74.8) | 27.2 (81.0) | 29.9 (85.8) | 34.0 (93.2) | 34.4 (93.9) | 29.4 (84.9) | 22.7 (72.9) | 17.5 (63.5) | 11.6 (52.9) | 22.7 (72.9) |
| Daily mean °C (°F) | 7.7 (45.9) | 10.0 (50.0) | 14.0 (57.2) | 19.0 (66.2) | 22.4 (72.3) | 25.3 (77.5) | 28.8 (83.8) | 28.6 (83.5) | 24.6 (76.3) | 19.0 (66.2) | 14.3 (57.7) | 9.2 (48.6) | 18.6 (65.4) |
| Mean daily minimum °C (°F) | 6.0 (42.8) | 7.7 (45.9) | 11.0 (51.8) | 15.5 (59.9) | 19.0 (66.2) | 22.1 (71.8) | 24.8 (76.6) | 24.6 (76.3) | 21.3 (70.3) | 16.7 (62.1) | 12.2 (54.0) | 7.6 (45.7) | 15.7 (60.3) |
| Record low °C (°F) | −1.3 (29.7) | −1.3 (29.7) | 0.1 (32.2) | 6.4 (43.5) | 11.1 (52.0) | 15.5 (59.9) | 18.3 (64.9) | 18.0 (64.4) | 15.4 (59.7) | 6.8 (44.2) | 3.3 (37.9) | −1.6 (29.1) | −1.6 (29.1) |
| Average precipitation mm (inches) | 17.6 (0.69) | 18.7 (0.74) | 48.3 (1.90) | 105.1 (4.14) | 159.1 (6.26) | 162.9 (6.41) | 119.0 (4.69) | 117.9 (4.64) | 108.9 (4.29) | 98.6 (3.88) | 55.0 (2.17) | 22.1 (0.87) | 1,033.2 (40.68) |
| Average precipitation days (≥ 0.1 mm) | 8.3 | 7.7 | 11.4 | 14.9 | 16.6 | 14.6 | 11.3 | 11.1 | 11.2 | 15.8 | 11.2 | 9.6 | 143.7 |
| Average snowy days | 0.3 | 0.1 | 0 | 0 | 0 | 0 | 0 | 0 | 0 | 0 | 0 | 0.1 | 0.5 |
| Average relative humidity (%) | 81 | 77 | 75 | 76 | 78 | 80 | 73 | 71 | 75 | 82 | 83 | 83 | 78 |
| Mean monthly sunshine hours | 35.3 | 50.9 | 90.2 | 120.0 | 124.7 | 122.5 | 205.5 | 208.0 | 138.3 | 77.8 | 62.8 | 32.6 | 1,268.6 |
| Percentage possible sunshine | 11 | 16 | 24 | 31 | 29 | 29 | 48 | 51 | 38 | 22 | 20 | 10 | 27 |
Source: China Meteorological Administration

== Ghost City ==
The Fengdu Ghost City is a tourist attraction modelled after Diyu, the concept of hell in Chinese mythology and Buddhism. It was built over 1,800 years ago. The ghost city became an island once the Three Gorges Dam project was completed. Specifically, part of the Fengdu Ghost City is or will be submerged, but scenery above the "Door of Hell" remains or will remain above water.

== Transportation ==
Fengdu has one Yangtze crossing, the Fengdu Yangtze River Bridge.

== Image gallery ==
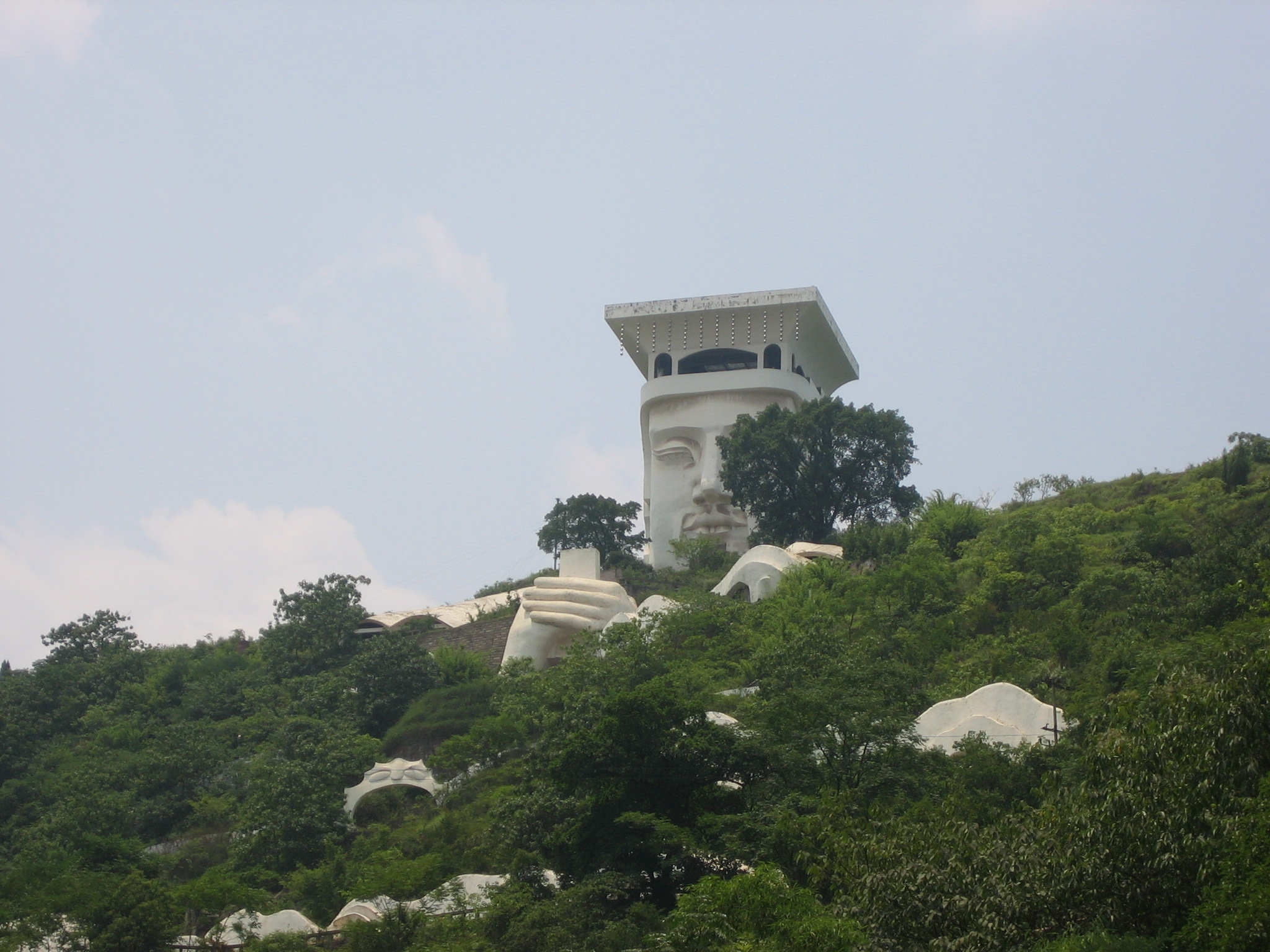
Façade of an unfinished five-star hotel overlooking Fengdu

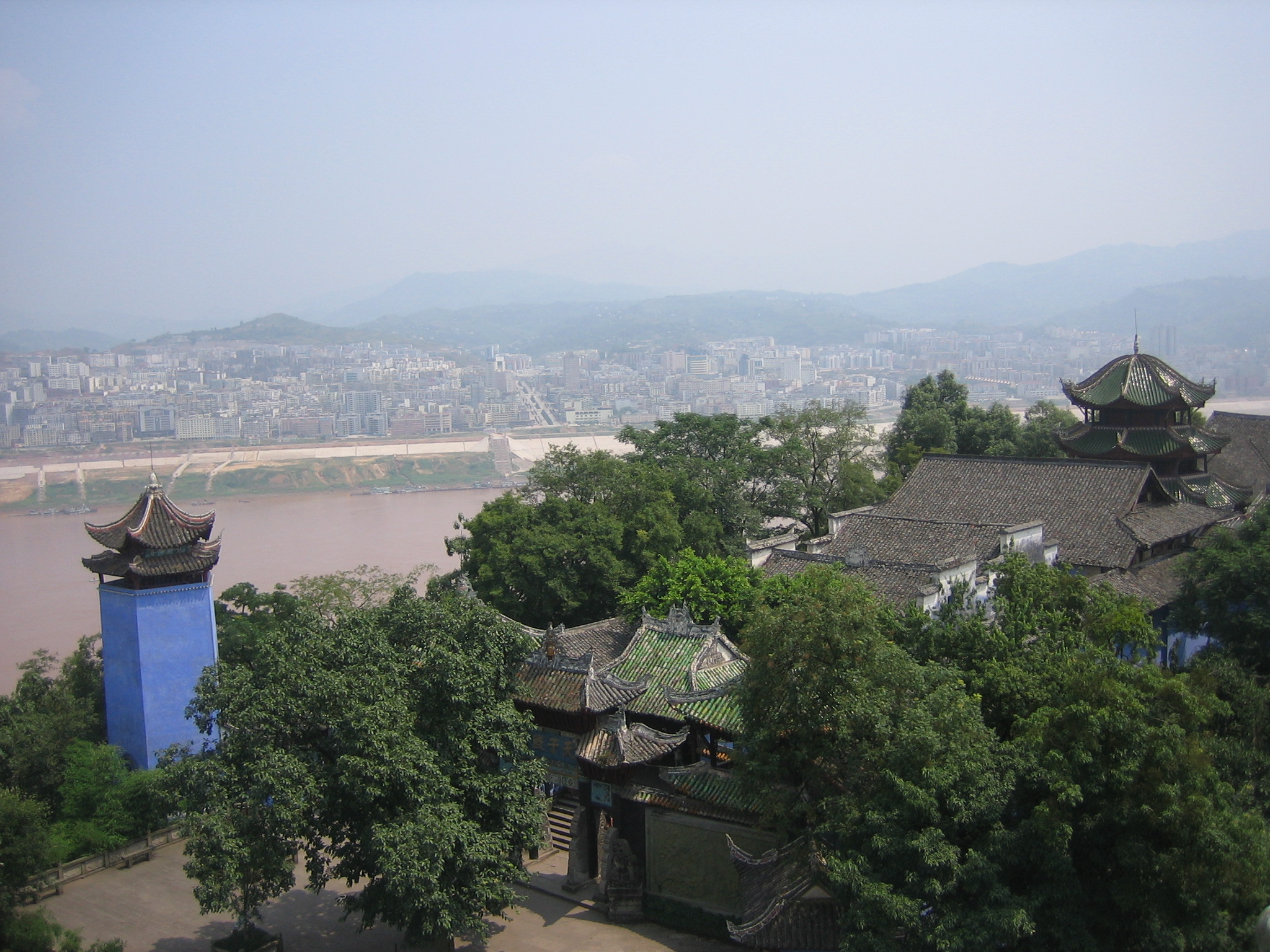
