= Lichuan railway station =

Railway station in Lichuan, Hubei, China

Lichuan 利川
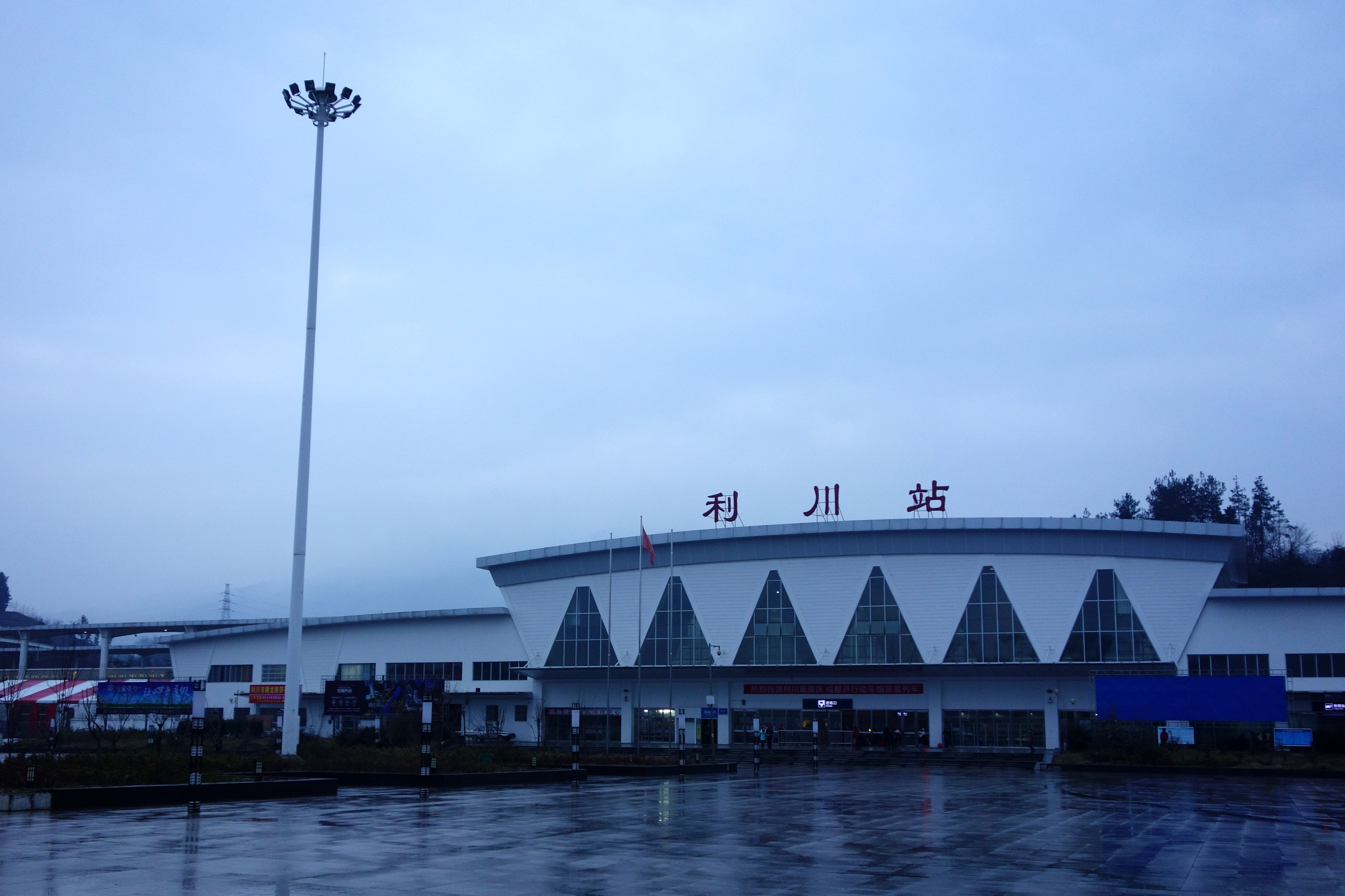
- Lichuan Railway Station in 2014

General information
- Location: Lichuan City, Hubei; China
- Coordinates: 30°16′53″N 108°56′3″E
- Operator: China Railway Corporation
- Lines: Yiwan Railway, Yuli Railway
Location

Lichuan station (利川站) is a railway station in Lichuan City, Enshi Tujia and Miao Autonomous Prefecture, in Hubei Province, People's Republic of China. The station is served by the Yiwan Railway, the Yichang to Wanzhou section of the Huhanrong passenger-dedicated line. It is also the eastern starting point of the Yuli Railway, which runs from Lichuan to Chongqing.

Preceding station	China Railway High-speed	Following station
Enshi towards Yichang East	Yichang–Wanzhou railway	Liangwu towards Wanzhou
Liangwu towards Chongqing North	Chongqing–Lichuan railway	Terminus
