= Lichuan, Hubei =

Lichuan 利川市 Lichwan
- County-level city
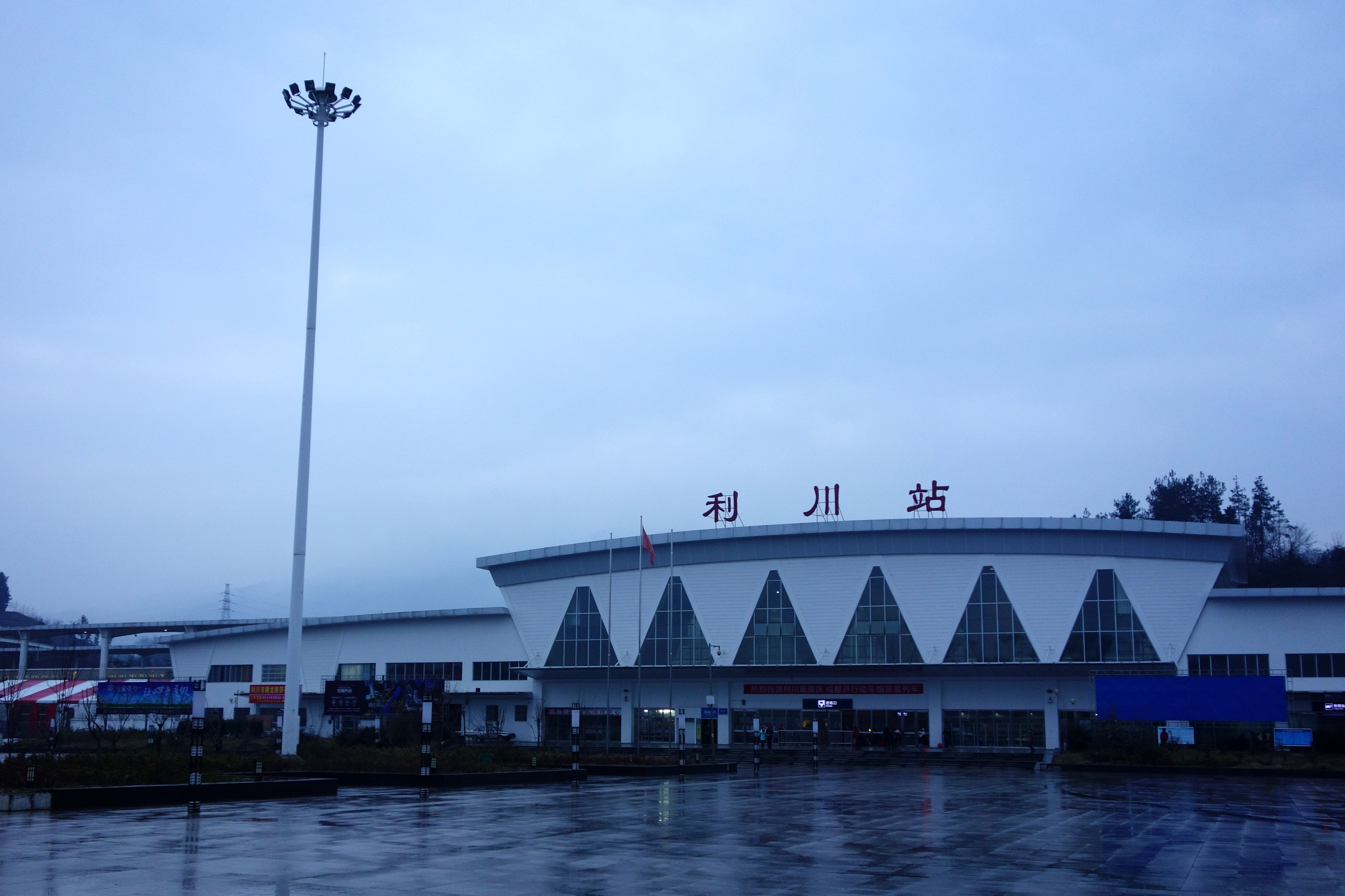
- Lichuan Railway Station

- Location in Hubei
- Coordinates: 30°17′28″N 108°56′11″E
- Country: People's Republic of China
- Province: Hubei
- Prefecture: Enshi
- Township-level divisions: 2 subdistricts 6 towns 6 townships
- Municipal seat: Duting Subdistrict (都亭街道)

Area
  - County-level city: 4,612.19 km^{2} (1,780.78 sq mi)
  - Urban: 133.00 km^{2} (51.35 sq mi)
- Elevation: 1,083 m (3,553 ft)

Population (2020)
  - County-level city: 750,670
  - Density: 162.76/km^{2} (421.54/sq mi)
  - Urban: 337,946
- Time zone: UTC+8 (China Standard)
- Area code: 0718
- Website: lichuan.gov.cn

Lichuan (Chinese: 利川市; pinyin: Lìchuān) is a county-level city of the Enshi Tujia and Miao Autonomous Prefecture, in southwestern Hubei province, People's Republic of China, located 52 kilometres (32 mi) west of Enshi City, the prefecture seat. It borders Chongqing Municipality to the southwest, west, and north. It has 750,670 inhabitants.

== Nature ==
Lichuan is believed to be the location of most (if not all) of the naturally growing Metasequoia glyptostroboides trees in existence. The genus Metasequoia, related to the giant redwoods of North America, was first described as a fossil from the Mesozoic Era in 1941. But in 1943 a small stand of an unidentified tree was discovered in Modaoxi (磨刀溪), presently known as Moudao (谋道) Town, in Lichuan County, by Zhan Wang. After the end of the World War II, this tree species was officially described as the only living species of Metasequoia, and given the scientific name Metasequoia glyptostroboides. In 1948 the Arnold Arboretum of Harvard University sent an expedition to Lichuan to collect seeds and, soon after, seedling trees were distributed to various universities and arboreta worldwide for growth trials.

Presently, a number of natural Metasequoia populations exist in the hills and wetlands of Lichuan. Most of these groups are small, with fewer than 30 trees each; however, the largest of them, in Xiaohe Valley, is estimated to consist of around 5,400 trees. Outside of Lichuan, a few trees are also said to exist in the Hunan Province.

The Tenglong Cave is located within a few miles from Lichuan.

== Administrative divisions ==
There are two subdistricts, seven towns, and five townships under the city's administration:

=== Subdistricts (街道) ===
Two subdistricts:

- Duting Subdistrict (都亭街道)
- Dongcheng Subdistrict (东城街道)

=== Towns (镇) ===
Seven towns:

- Moudao (谋道镇)
- Baiyangba (柏杨坝镇)
- Wangying (汪营镇)
- Jiannan (建南镇)
- Zhonglu (忠路镇)
- Tuanbao (团堡镇)
- Maoba (毛坝镇) (before 2013 was Maoba Township (毛坝乡))

=== Townships (乡) ===
Five townships:

- Liangwu Township (凉雾乡)
- Yuanbao Township (元堡乡)
- Nanping Township (南坪乡)
- Wendou Township (文斗乡)
- Shaxi Township (沙溪乡)

== Climate ==
Climate data for Lichuan, elevation 1,074 m (3,524 ft), (1991–2020 normals, extremes 1981–present)
Month	Jan	Feb	Mar	Apr	May	Jun	Jul	Aug	Sep	Oct	Nov	Dec	Year
Record high °C (°F)	17.5 (63.5)	21.9 (71.4)	30.3 (86.5)	32.0 (89.6)	31.6 (88.9)	33.7 (92.7)	36.4 (97.5)	35.9 (96.6)	33.2 (91.8)	28.0 (82.4)	23.9 (75.0)	19.7 (67.5)	36.4 (97.5)
Mean daily maximum °C (°F)	5.8 (42.4)	8.1 (46.6)	13.0 (55.4)	18.7 (65.7)	22.3 (72.1)	25.4 (77.7)	28.0 (82.4)	28.1 (82.6)	23.7 (74.7)	18.2 (64.8)	13.6 (56.5)	8.0 (46.4)	17.7 (63.9)
Daily mean °C (°F)	2.4 (36.3)	4.4 (39.9)	8.2 (46.8)	13.5 (56.3)	17.4 (63.3)	20.7 (69.3)	23.2 (73.8)	22.7 (72.9)	18.9 (66.0)	13.7 (56.7)	9.1 (48.4)	4.0 (39.2)	13.2 (55.7)
Mean daily minimum °C (°F)	0.0 (32.0)	1.7 (35.1)	4.9 (40.8)	9.7 (49.5)	13.8 (56.8)	17.3 (63.1)	19.9 (67.8)	19.1 (66.4)	15.6 (60.1)	10.9 (51.6)	6.1 (43.0)	1.4 (34.5)	10.0 (50.1)
Record low °C (°F)	−10.2 (13.6)	−9.0 (15.8)	−5.1 (22.8)	0.3 (32.5)	5.1 (41.2)	9.2 (48.6)	11.4 (52.5)	12.3 (54.1)	7.0 (44.6)	0.5 (32.9)	−3.7 (25.3)	−8.6 (16.5)	−10.2 (13.6)
Average precipitation mm (inches)	24.5 (0.96)	32.0 (1.26)	63.3 (2.49)	118.5 (4.67)	179.1 (7.05)	191.1 (7.52)	197.8 (7.79)	158.1 (6.22)	122.4 (4.82)	104.4 (4.11)	63.9 (2.52)	22.4 (0.88)	1,277.5 (50.29)
Average precipitation days (≥ 0.1 mm)	12.7	12.1	13.9	15.7	17.6	16.8	16.8	14.8	13.0	15.2	12.3	10.6	171.5
Average snowy days	11.6	7.0	2.6	0.2	0	0	0	0	0	0	0.9	5.7	28
Average relative humidity (%)	80	79	78	78	79	81	81	80	81	83	82	80	80
Mean monthly sunshine hours	50.7	46.0	85.1	109.5	116.7	114.1	158.6	176.7	115.0	87.9	75.2	63.1	1,198.6
Percentage possible sunshine	16	14	23	28	28	27	37	43	31	25	24	20	26
Source: China Meteorological Administration all-time extreme temperature

== Transport ==
China National Highway 318 runs through Lichuan on its way from Enshi to Wanzhou, Chongqing. G50 Shanghai–Chongqing Expressway also passes to the south of the city centre.

Until the opening of the Yiwan Railway in 2010, there were no railways in Lichuan (or anywhere in Enshi Prefecture). Now Lichuan Station has regular service to Chengdu, Wuhan, and points beyond. In the future, Lichuan will become a junction where the future Yuli Railway (the line from Lichuan toward Chongqing) will join the Yiwan Railway mainline (from Yichang via Lichuan to Wanzhou, with further connections to Chengdu).

Proposals have also been made for the construction of a tourist scenic railway between Lichuan Railway Station and the region's popular tourist attractions, the Tenglong Cave and the Enshi Grand Canyon Scenic Area (恩施大峡谷景区).
