= Chongqing–Lichuan railway =

Railway line in China

Chongqing–Lichuan railway Lichuan-Chongqing section of the Shanghai–Wuhan–Chengdu passenger railway corridor
- CRH logo

Overview
- Native name: 渝利铁路 宁蓉线凉渝段
- Status: Operational
- Owner: CR Chengdu
- Locale: Chongqing; Hubei province
- Termini: Chongqing North; Lichuan
- Stations: 9

Service
- Type: High-speed rail Heavy rail Freight rail
- System: China Railway High-speed
- Operator(s): CR Chengdu

Technical
- Line length: 259.5 km (161 mi)
- Track gauge: 1,435 mm (4 ft 8 1/2 in) standard gauge
- Electrification: 25 kV 50 Hz AC (Overhead line)
- Operating speed: 200 km/h (124 mph)
- Maximum incline: 9‰

Chongqing–Lichuan railway
- Simplified Chinese: 渝利铁路
- Traditional Chinese: 渝利鐵路
Transcriptions
Standard Mandarin
- Hanyu Pinyin: Yúlì Kèyùn Zhuānxiàn

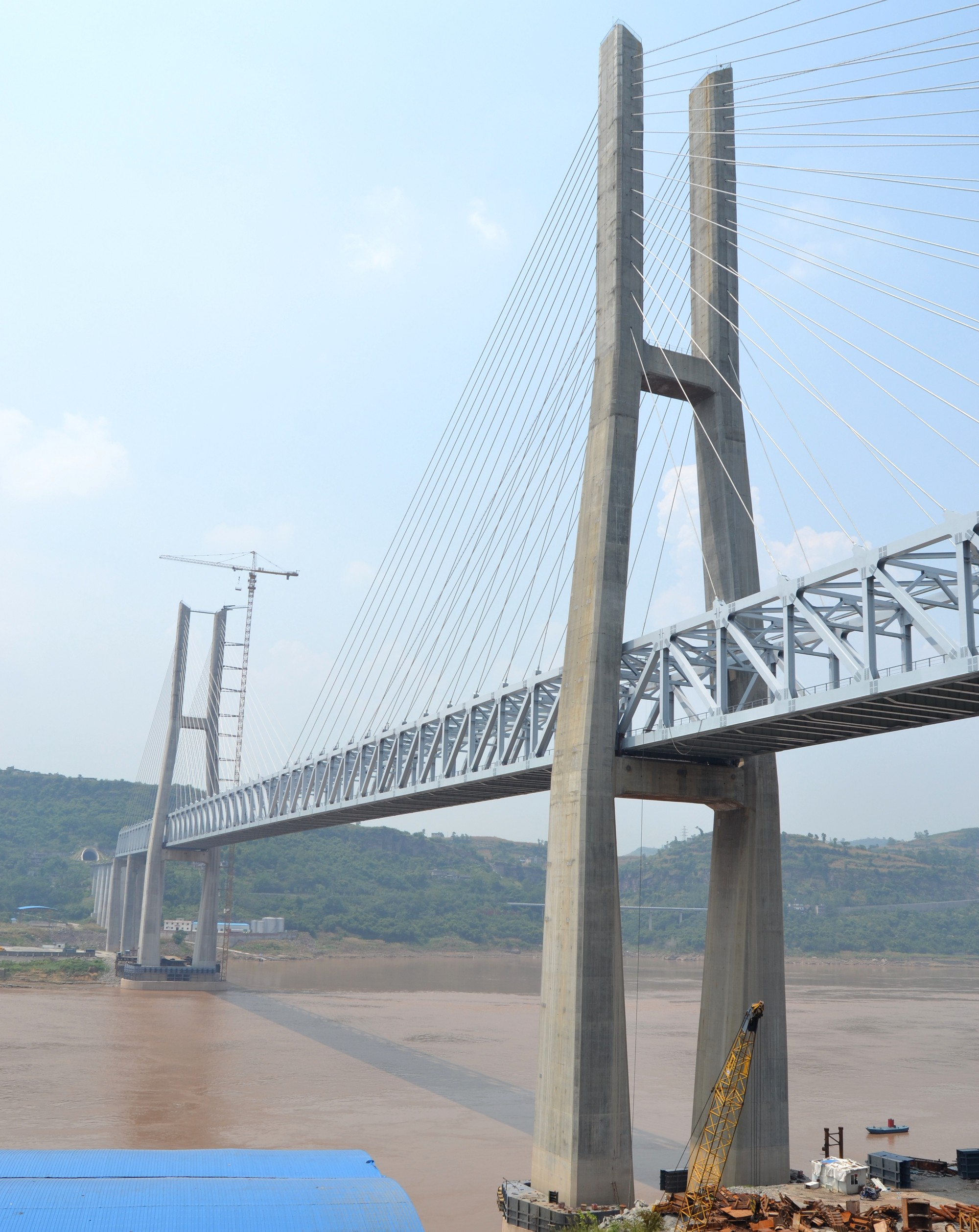
The railway crossing the Yangtze over the Hanjiatuo Bridge

The Chongqing–Lichuan railway, or the Yuli railway (simplified Chinese: 渝利铁路; traditional Chinese: 渝利鐵路; pinyin: Yú-Lì Tiělù) is a railway connecting central Chongqing with the Hubei city of Lichuan. The 244 km (152 mi) long railway, connecting Chongqing North railway station with the Lichuan Station on the Yichang–Wanzhou railway, is a section of the Shanghai–Wuhan–Chengdu passenger railway, which extends to Wuhan, Nanjing, and Shanghai.

== Services ==
Together with the Hankou–Yichang and Yichang–Lichuan sections of the Huhanrong mainline, the Chongqing–Lichuan line forms what was, until the completion of the Xi'an–Chengdu high-speed railway, the only high-speed rail connection between the Sichuan Basin and the rest of China. It carries numerous high-speed trains running between the cities of the Sichuan Basin (Chengdu and Chongqing) and various destinations in the central and eastern China.

The trains are traveling on the Yuli line with the speed up to 200 km/h (120 mph). It was said that when the Yuli railway and the relevant sections of the Huhanrong mainline are completed, one would be able to travel from Chongqing to Shanghai in just 10 hours. As of mid-2015, no service this fast seem to exist yet (there is no G-series train directly to Shanghai), but several D-series trains do make it from Chongqing to Shanghai in 13–15 hours. There are also G-series trains running from Chongqing to Beijing (2,078 km or 1,291 mi) in 12.5 hours (G309).

== Construction history ==
Construction work started in the late 2008; the plans were for it to be completed within four years. As of August 2012, it was expected that the railway will be completed by the end of 2013.

A 139-metre (456 ft) tall pier of the railway's Caijiagou Bridge (蔡家沟特大桥), located in Fuling District, is said to be the world's tallest railway bridge pier. The railway's Hanjiatuo Bridge over the Yangtze is said to have the longest main span (432 m (1,417 ft)) among the world's double-track railway cable-stayed bridges.

Two sets of CRH2A high speed train-sets commenced testing of the completed Yuli railway line on December 11, 2013, from Chengdu to Chongqing. It was expected for the line to be opened by the end of December 2013.

The Chongqing–Lichuan line was opened to conventional rail traffic at the end of December 2013, and full high speed services were expected to commence by the end of June 2014.

== See also ==
- List of railway lines in China
