= Yichang–Wanzhou railway =

Railway line in China

Yichang–Wanzhou railway Yichang-Wanzhou section of the Shanghai–Wuhan–Chengdu passenger railway corridor
- CRH logo
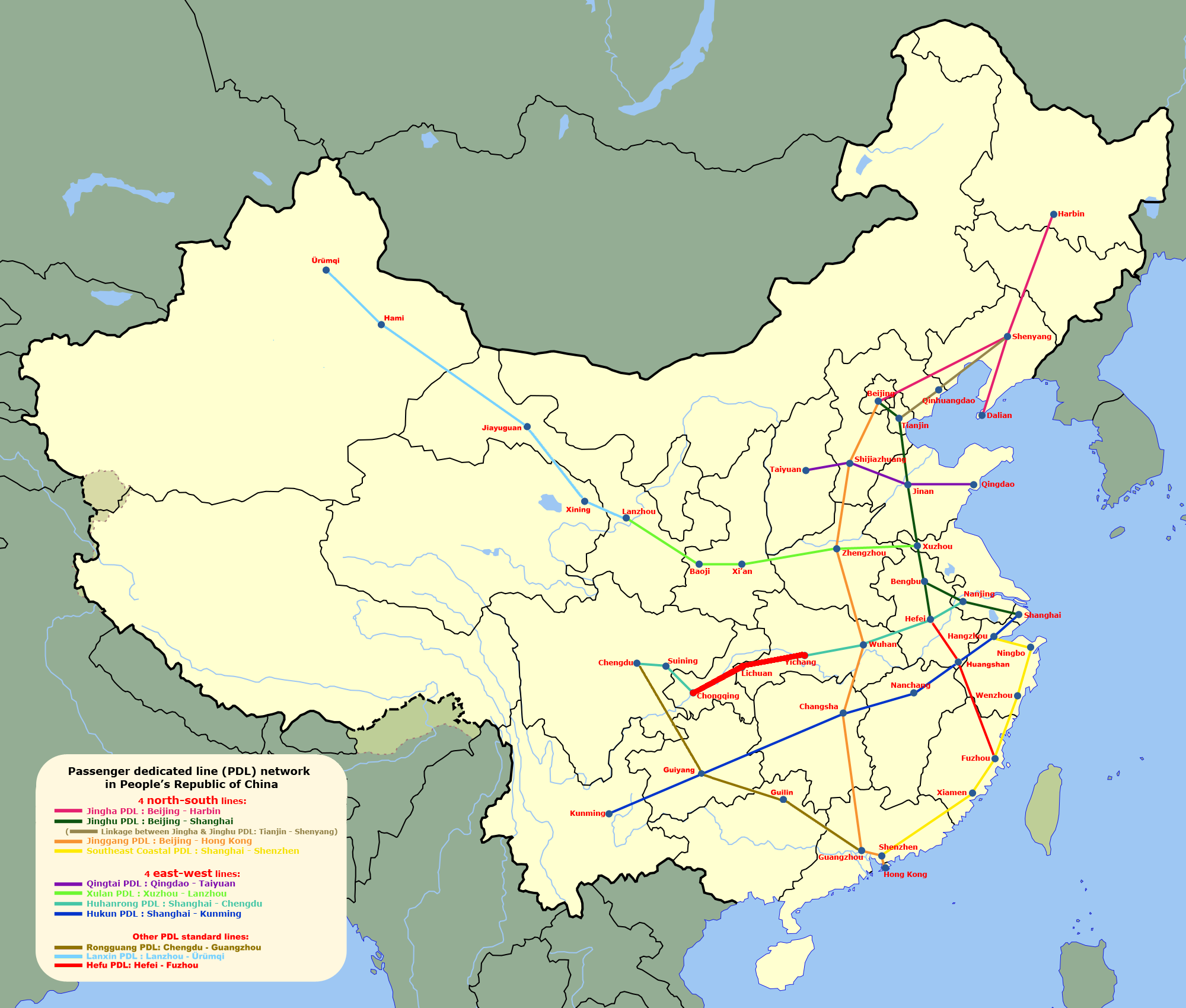
- The Yichang–Chongqing route, formed by the Yichang–Lichuan section of the Yiwan line and the Yuli (Lichuan–Chongqing) line, shown as a thick red line on the map of China's HSR construction plan

Overview
- Other name: Yiwan railway
- Native name: 宜万铁路
- Status: Operational
- Owner: CR Wuhan; CR Chengdu
- Locale: Hubei Province
- Termini: Yichang East; Wanzhou
- Stations: 24

Service
- Type: High-speed rail Heavy rail
- System: China Railway High-speed
- Operator(s): CR Wuhan; CR Chengdu

History
- Opened: 1 July 2012; 13 years ago

Technical
- Line length: 377 km (234 mi)
- Track gauge: 1,435 mm (4 ft 8 1/2 in) standard gauge
- Electrification: 25 kV 50 Hz AC (Overhead line)
- Operating speed: 200 km/h (124 mph) max. (Yichang–Lichuan); 120 km/h (75 mph) max. (Lichuan–Wanzhou)

The Yichang–Wanzhou railway, or the Yiwan railway (simplified Chinese: 宜万铁路; traditional Chinese: 宜萬鐵路; pinyin: Yíwàn Tiělù) connects the cities of Yichang (Hubei Province) and Wanzhou (Chongqing Municipality) via Lichuan, Hubei. It was completed in 2010 and forms part of the Shanghai–Wuhan–Chengdu passenger railway. Out of the line's total 377 km (234 mi) length, 288 km (179 mi) runs on bridges or in tunnels. According to the chief engineer, Zhang Mei, the line was the most difficult ever constructed in China. Operation started on 22 December 2010.

== Connections ==
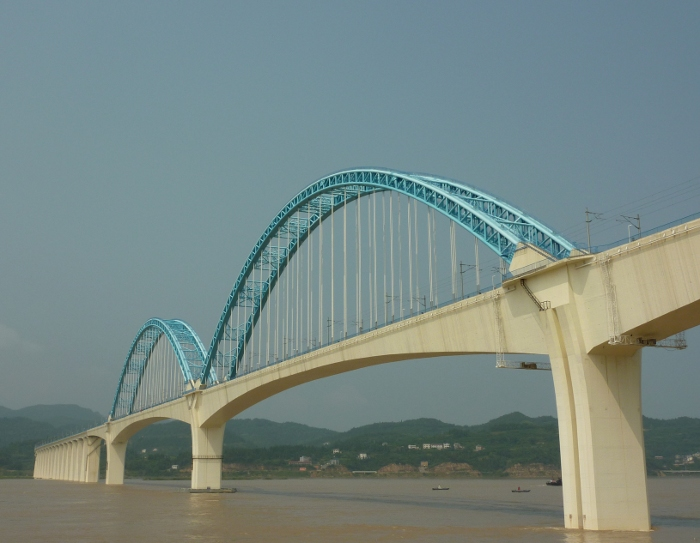
The Yichang Railway Bridge over the Yangtze River near the eastern terminus of the railway in Yichang.

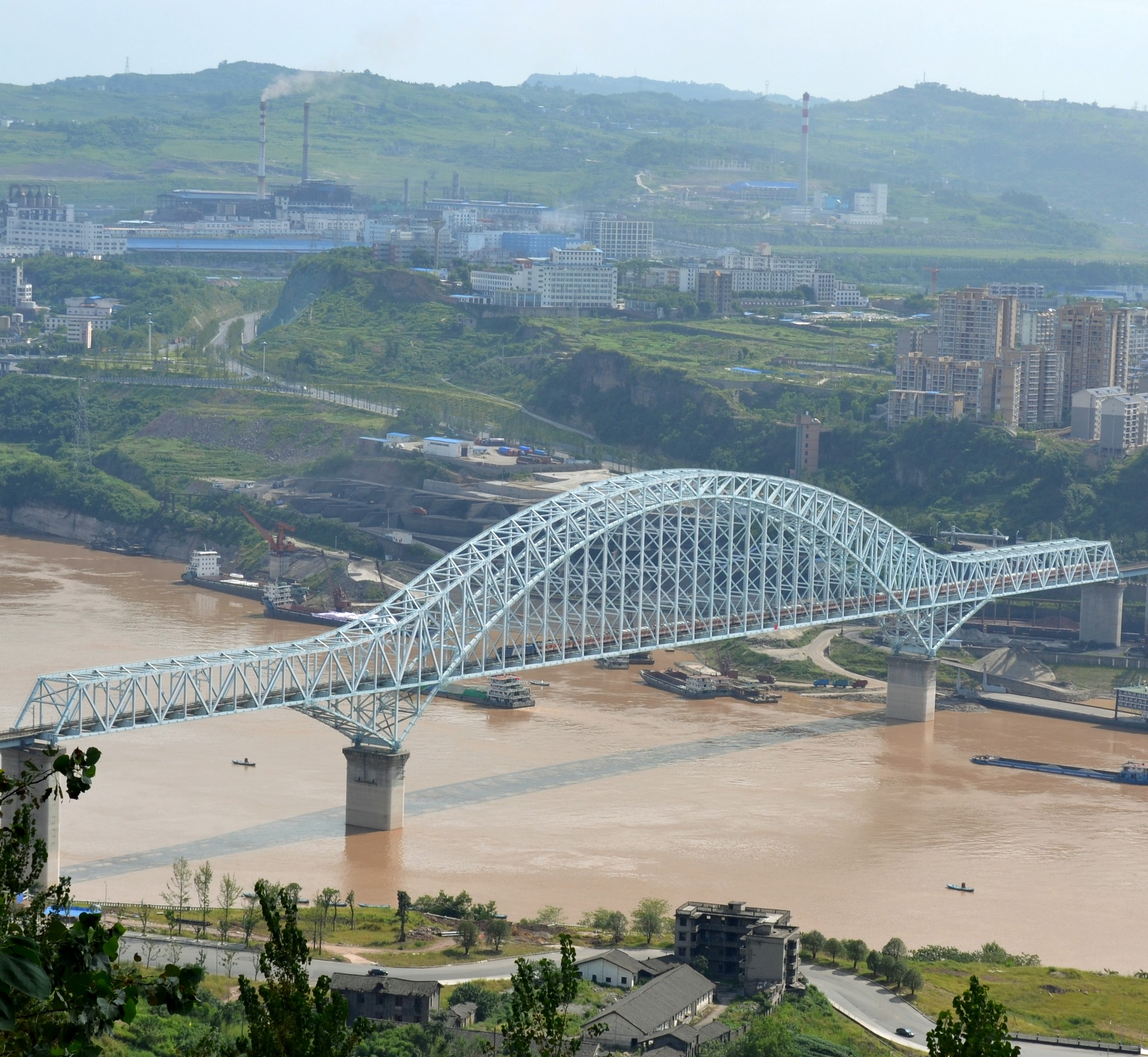
The railway crosses the Yangtze River a second time near its western terminus, Wanzhou. Pictured is the Wanzhou Railway Bridge.

At its eastern end, the Yichang East railway station, the Yiwan Railway connects with the high-speed Wuhan–Yichang railway to Hankou (Wuhan).

At Liangwu railway station, the Yichang–Wanzhou railway connects with the high-speed Chongqing–Lichuan railway (Yuli), the main route of the Huhanrong corridor, which provides the most direct connection to Chongqing and on to Chengdu. From Liangwu, the Yichang–Wanzhou railway heads north to reach Wanzhou. With the Yuli and Hanyi lines both in operation and in use by high-speed, it will become possible to travel by train between Wuhan and Chongqing in around 5 hours, compared to the 22 hours before the opening of the Yiwan Line. However, the opening of high-speed service (as opposed to "regular" trains) on the Yichang–Wanzhou railway was delayed until July 1, 2014.

Until the Yuli line was completed at the end of 2013, all through traffic on the Yiwan Railway had to go along its entire length, to the line's western terminus at Wanzhou, and then over an existing railway branch to Dazhou, Sichuan. From Dazhou, trains could continue both southwest toward Chongqing on the Xiangyang–Chongqing railway and west toward Chengdu on the Dazhou–Chengdu Railway.

== Layout ==
The 377 km (234 mi) long railway crosses the remarkably difficult terrain of southwestern Hubei (Yichang City and Enshi Tujia and Miao Autonomous Prefecture) and the eastern part of the Chongqing Municipality (Wanzhou District). The region has numerous mountains and is sometimes referred to as "the eastern edge" of the Yunnan–Guizhou Plateau. Until recently, the region had no railways, and hardly any paved roads (beyond China National Highway 318, which the new railway more or less parallels). The new (G42 Hurong Expressway) was built along the same corridor as well (see Si Du River Bridge for an example of engineering that was required).

Out of the entire length of the rail line, 324 km (201 mi) are in Hubei and 53 km (33 mi) in Chongqing Municipality. Owing to the difficult terrain, the project involved a large number of bridges (including two over the Yangtze River: the Wanzhou Railway Bridge and the Yichang Railway Bridge) and tunnels. Out of the line's total 377 km (234 mi) length, 288 km (179 mi) runs on bridges or in tunnels. This made the line the most difficult and the most expensive (per kilometre) of all China's railways up to that time. At a cost of U.S. $9.01 million per kilometre, the per-kilometre construction costs were twice as high as those for the Qinghai–Tibet Railway which cost U.S. $4.35 million per kilometre.

== Construction history ==
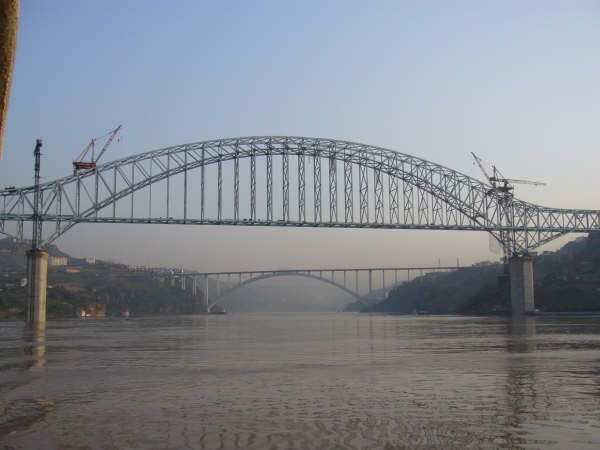
Construction of the Wanzhou Railway Bridge, at the western end of the Yiwan line

The railway was first proposed by Sun Yat-sen in 1903, but construction was not started until 2003 due to the difficulties of the project. According to the chief engineer, Zhang Mei, the line was the most difficult ever constructed in China.

As of mid-2009, the embankments, bridges, and tunnels along the Yiwan Railway had been mostly completed, and about half the rails had been laid. On 18 August 2010, the line's construction was completed. Local media reported that the line would become operational in November 2010.

Trial operations started on 19 November, and regular operation started on 22 December 2010, with passenger trains from Wuhan running to Lichuan; on 10 January 2011 a through-passenger service started from Wuhan to Chongqing over the entire Yiwan line.

== See also ==
- List of railway lines in China
