= Enshi Tujia and Miao Autonomous Prefecture =

Enshi Prefecture 恩施州 Enshih
- Autonomous prefecture
- 恩施土家族苗族自治州 Enrshiv bifzivkar befkar zifzifzoux(Tujia) Entshil tutjadcul maolcul zibzhibzhoud(Miao)
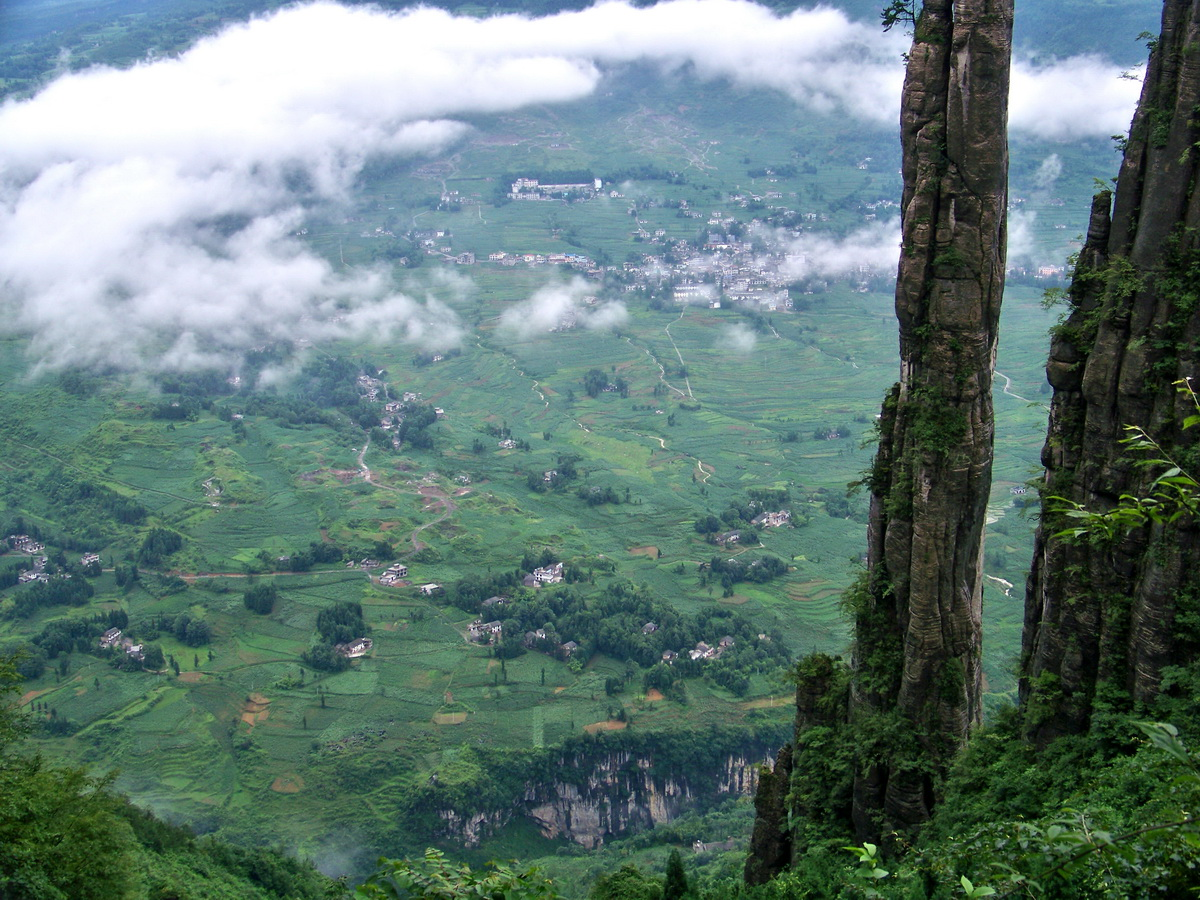
- Enshi Grand Canyon

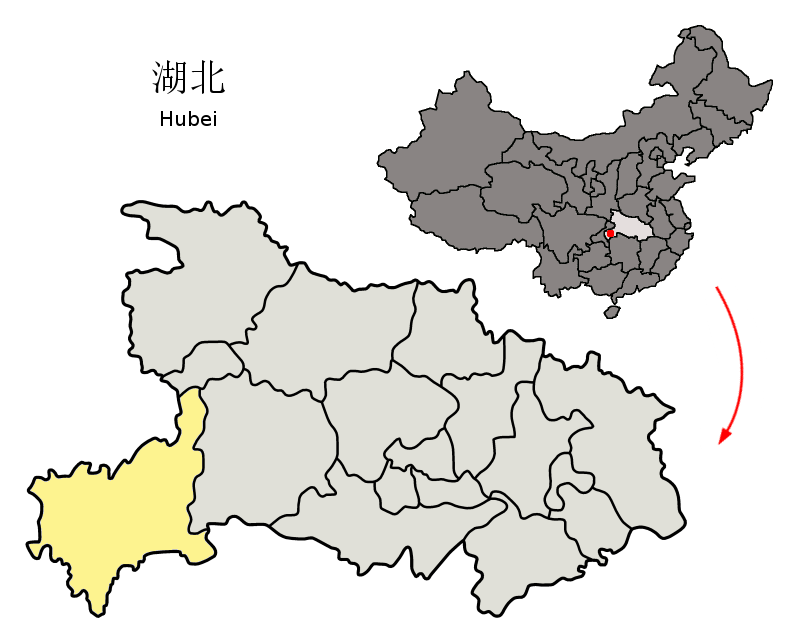
- Location of Enshi Prefecture in Hubei
- Coordinates (Enshi Prefecture government): 30°16′19″N 109°29′17″E
- Country: People's Republic of China
- Province: Hubei
- Prefecture seat: Enshi City

Area
  - Total: 24,061 km^{2} (9,290 sq mi)

Population (2010)
  - Total: 3,290,294
  - Density: 136.75/km^{2} (354.18/sq mi)

GDP
  - Total: CN¥ 67.1 billion US$ 10.8 billion
  - Per capita: CN¥ 20,191; US$ 3,242
- Time zone: UTC+8 (China Standard)
- Postal code: 445000
- Area code: 0718
- ISO 3166 code: CN-HB-28
- Website: enshi.gov.cn

Enshi Tujia and Miao Autonomous Prefecture
- Chinese: 恩施土家族苗族自治州
Transcriptions
Standard Mandarin
- Hanyu Pinyin: Ēnshī Tǔjiāzú Miáozú Zìzhìzhōu
- Wade–Giles: En^{1}-shih^{1} T'u^{3}-chia^{1}-tsu^{2} Miao^{2}-tsu^{2} Tzu^{4}-chih^{4}-chou^{1}

Former name
- Chinese: 施南
- Postal: Shihnan
Transcriptions
Standard Mandarin
- Hanyu Pinyin: Shīnán
- Wade–Giles: Shih^{1}-nan^{2}

Enshi Tujia and Miao Autonomous Prefecture (Chinese: 恩施土家族苗族自治州; pinyin: Ēnshī Tǔjiāzú Miáozú Zìzhìzhōu) is located in the mountainous southwestern corner of Hubei province, People's Republic of China. It forms Hubei's southwestern "panhandle", bordering on Hunan in the south and Chongqing Municipality in the west and northwest. The Yangtze River crosses the prefecture's northeastern corner in Badong County.

== Administrative divisions ==
There are two county-level cities:

- Enshi City (恩施市), the prefectural seat
- Lichuan City (利川市)

There are six counties:

- Xianfeng County (咸丰县)
- Laifeng County (来凤县)
- Badong County (巴东县)
- Jianshi County (建始县)
- Hefeng County (鹤峰县)
- Xuan'en County (宣恩县)

Map
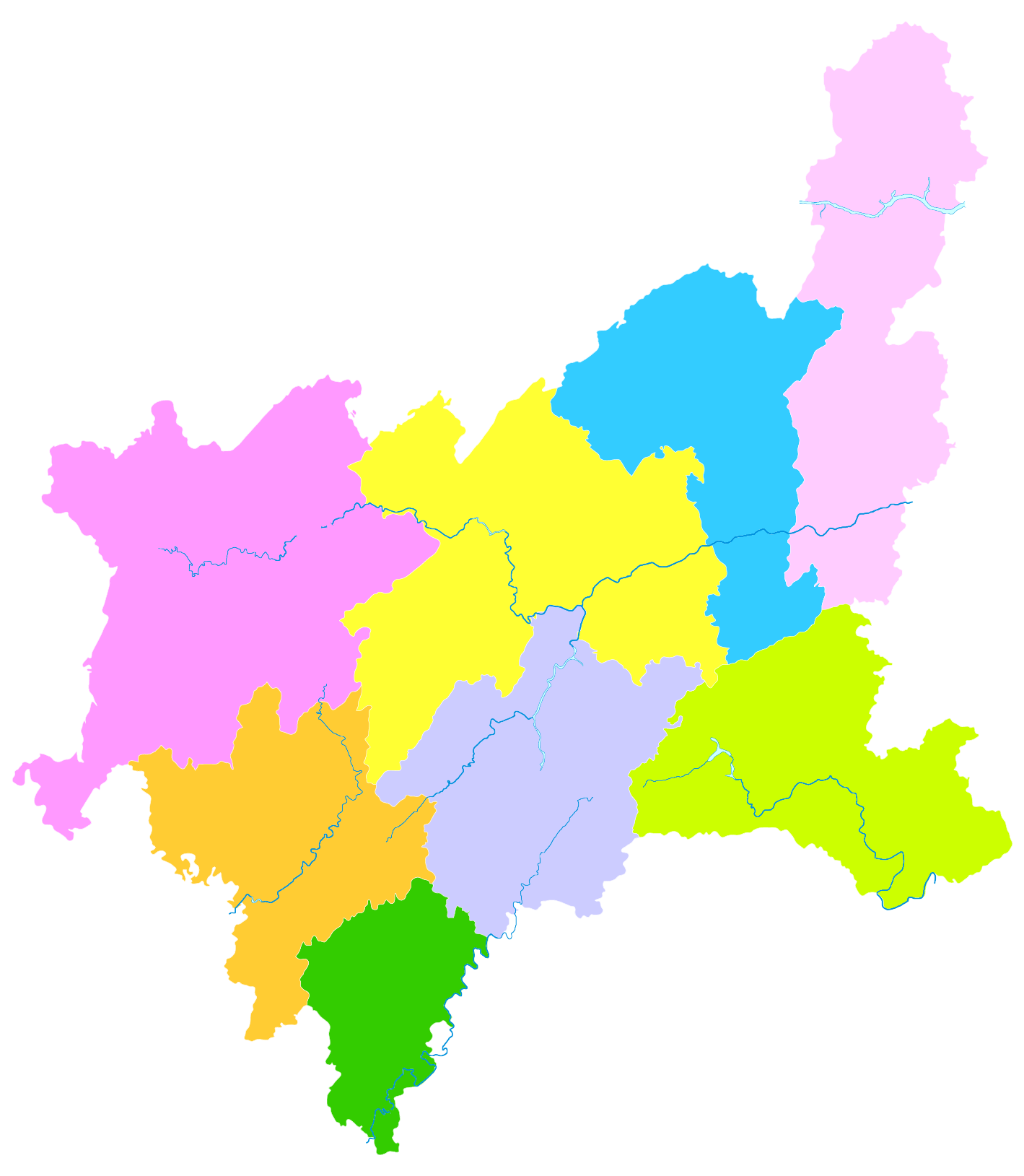

== History ==
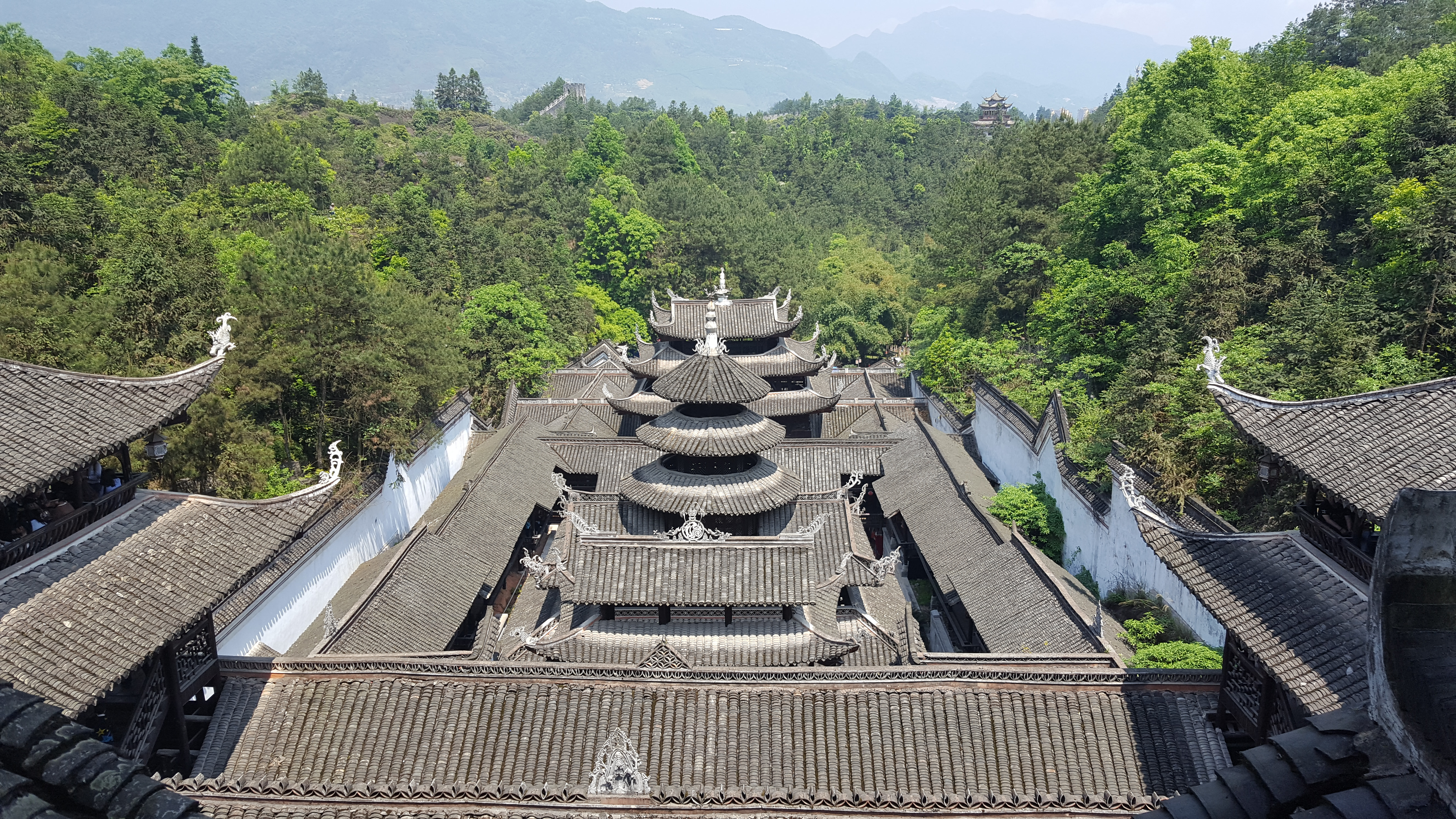
Aerial view of Enshi Tusi Imperial City

=== Imperial ===
In 1735, Enshi came under direct rule after four hundred years of the tusi system; local chieftains were replaced by regular imperial officials.

=== Republican ===
The Republic of China's Hubei provincial government was relocated to Enshi during the 1937-45 resistance war (against Japanese invasion and occupation).

The Roman Catholic Church had the Diocese of Shinan on the territory of today's Enshi Prefecture.

=== People's Republic of China ===
Badong County was the site of the Deng Yujiao incident.

== Geography ==
The Yangtze passes through Enshi Prefecture's Badong County.

Enshi Prefecture is located in the west end of Hubei Province, a mountainous belt separating Hubei's Jianghan Plain from the Sichuan Basin.

There are karst phenomena in the region. The most famous of them is perhaps the Tenglong Cave near Lichuan, a county-level city of Enshi Tujia and Miao Autonomous Prefecture. A 290-meter deep karst sinkhole, located near the village of Luoquanyan (锣圈岩村) in Xuan'en County, is described as possessing its own unique ecosystem.

The Enshi Grand Canyon is also a well-known scenic area.

== Demographics ==
The total area is 24,000 square kilometres (9,300 sq mi), and the population is 3,800,000. 52.6% of the population belong to the Tujia and Miao nationalities. Enshi is the only autonomous prefecture in Hubei province.

Enshi is also the only part of Hubei which has been included in the Chinese government's Western exploration programme and over the next 5–10 years they will put 50 billion RMB into its development.

== Culture ==
=== Language ===
The local varieties of Mandarin Chinese, usually classified by county, are a part of Southwestern Mandarin. The dialect of Enshi City is considered standard in the prefecture. Some differences from Standard Chinese phonology are the merging of the consonants /n/ and /l/, and of /x/ and /f/.

=== Cuisine ===
Traditional foods are called "hezha foods" after hezha (合渣), a regional specialty of soybean pulp and vegetables. Historically, people in Enshi considered their foods to be a branch of Sichuan cuisine, and after ethnic classification they have been considered Tujia foods. Although meat and rice had become abundant, local cuisine became popular again in the 1990s.

The main flavors of traditional Enshi cuisine are sour, spicy, sweet, and glutinous. Maize is eaten more than rice, and potatoes and sweet potatoes are also staple foods. Other common ingredients are soybeans, preserved vegetables, wild plants, and chili peppers. Many festival foods use glutinous rice, and banquets have more meat dishes and maize wine. Compared to mainstream Chinese cuisine, there are more mixed dishes and a looser distinction between fan (staples) and cai (meat/vegetables).

Widely-eaten dishes include oil-tea soup, baogufan, and shefan. Oil-tea soup (油茶汤) is made with tea seed oil, tea, popped glutinous rice, and maize. Baogufan (包谷饭) is steamed cornmeal and rice. Shefan (社饭) is a glutinous rice and wormwood dish traditionally eaten for Chunshe.

== Transportation ==
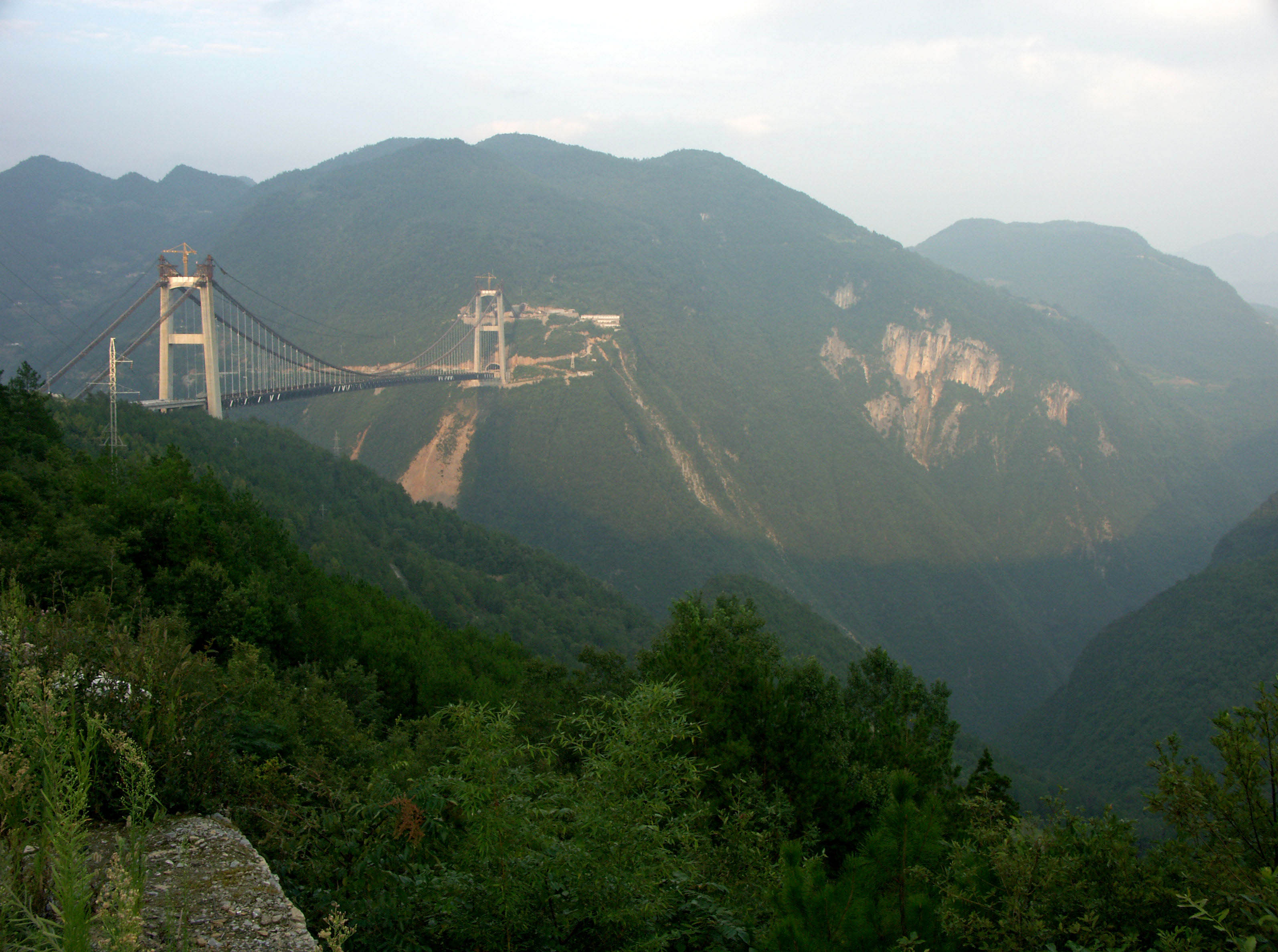
The Sidu River Bridge in southern Badong County, the world's second highest bridge

The prefecture has only a small amount of Yangtze River frontage, but Badong, in the prefecture's northeast, has a Yangtze River port.

The Qing River in the central part of the prefecture, with its cascade of reservoirs, is an important waterway as well.

Due to the mountainous terrain, until recently the prefecture had no railways, and even the highways were of doubtful quality.

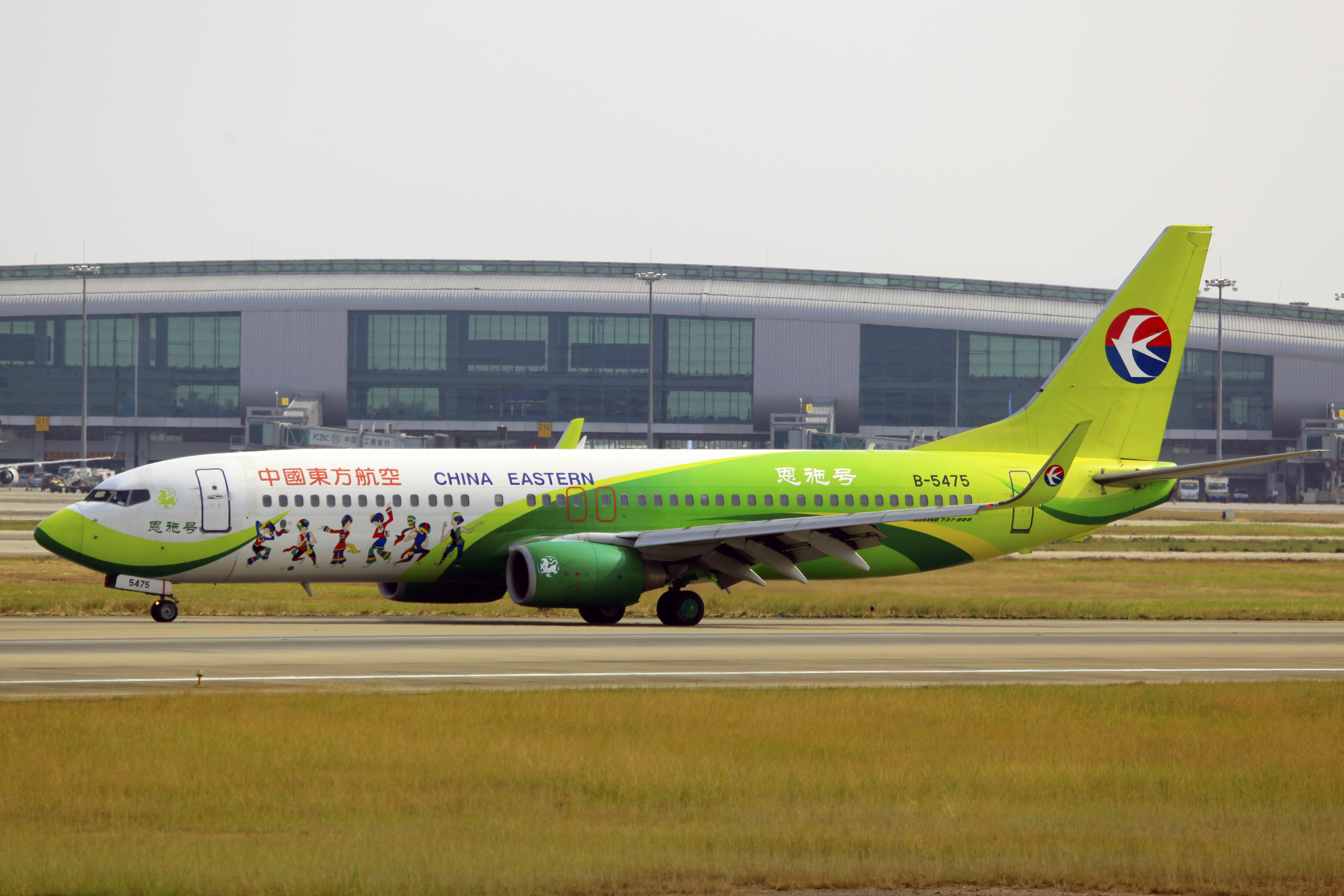
A China Eastern Airlines aircraft in a special livery for promotion of tourism in the prefecture

The Yichang−Wanzhou Railway, completed in December 2010, crosses the prefecture from east to west, providing a more direct connection between Hubei and Sichuan than was previously available. In addition, the Chongqing−Lichuan Railway from the Lichuan Railway Station on the Yiwan line connects the cities. A single line now connects Enshi with Beijing and Wuhan as well as many additional cities. The train between Beijing and Enshi takes approximately 24 hours and includes many stops along the way.

The G42 Shanghai–Chengdu Expressway, routed along the same Yichang-Wanzhou corridor, was completed in 2014. Sidu River Bridge, part of the expressway, was at the time of its construction the world's highest bridge.

Xujiaping Airport is the only airport in Enshi.

== Economy ==
Enshi City has selenium deposits. Between 1930 and 1960, people in some villages reported symptoms of selenium poisoning, and Yutangba residents were evacuated after their livestock died. Later, selenium deposits were discovered near Yutangba and found to be highly enriched, unlike previously known deposits. Selenium Square in the city is named after this rare element.

The countryside has a diverse range of flora and fauna, including many Chinese herbs. Much of the mountain landscape is covered in virgin forest and is home to pangolins.

Enshi locals are especially proud of their potato crops and consider the potato and tea crops to be the region's agricultural specialties.

Enshi Prefecture possesses significant hydroelectric resources. Among major hydroelectric dams already completed, or under construction, within the prefecture are:

- Shuibuya Dam, on the Qing River in Badong County — the tallest concrete face rock-fill dam in the world.
- Jiangpinghe Dam, on the Loushui River, near Jiangpingh Village, Zouma Town, Hefeng County.
- Dongping Dam, in Wanjia Township (万家乡), Xuan'en County
