= Longgu Cave =

Cave in Hubei, China

- Giant Ape Cave
- Interactive map of Longgu Cave
- Location: Jintang Village, Gaoping Town, Jianshi County, Enshi City, Hubei Province

The Longgu Cave (simplified Chinese: 龙骨洞; traditional Chinese: 龍骨洞), literally meaning "Dragon Bone Cave", also known as Giant Ape Cave, is a cave located in Longgu Slope, Jintang Village, Gaoping Town, Jianshi County, Enshi City, Hubei Province. It is 120 m (390 ft) long, 6 to 7 m (20 to 23 ft) high and 2 to 15 m (6 1/2 to 49 ft) wide. The Cave is divided into two entrances, east and west, the east entrance is 3.5 m (11 ft) high and the west entrance is 2 m (6 1/2 ft) high.

In 1970, a field team from the Institute of Vertebrate Paleontology and Paleoanthropology (IVPP) discovered the Longgu Cave in Jiansi County and conducted an official excavation. The Cave spans from 1.2 to 2.5 million years ago and was named "Jianshi Homo Erectus Site" by the IVPP.

From 1970 to 1998, the IVPP and the Hubei Institute of Cultural Relics and Archaeology successively conducted eight excavations here, and they were always searching for new information and new information on the survival and reproduction of ancient humans here.
