= Enshi Grand Canyon =

Natural area in Hubei, China

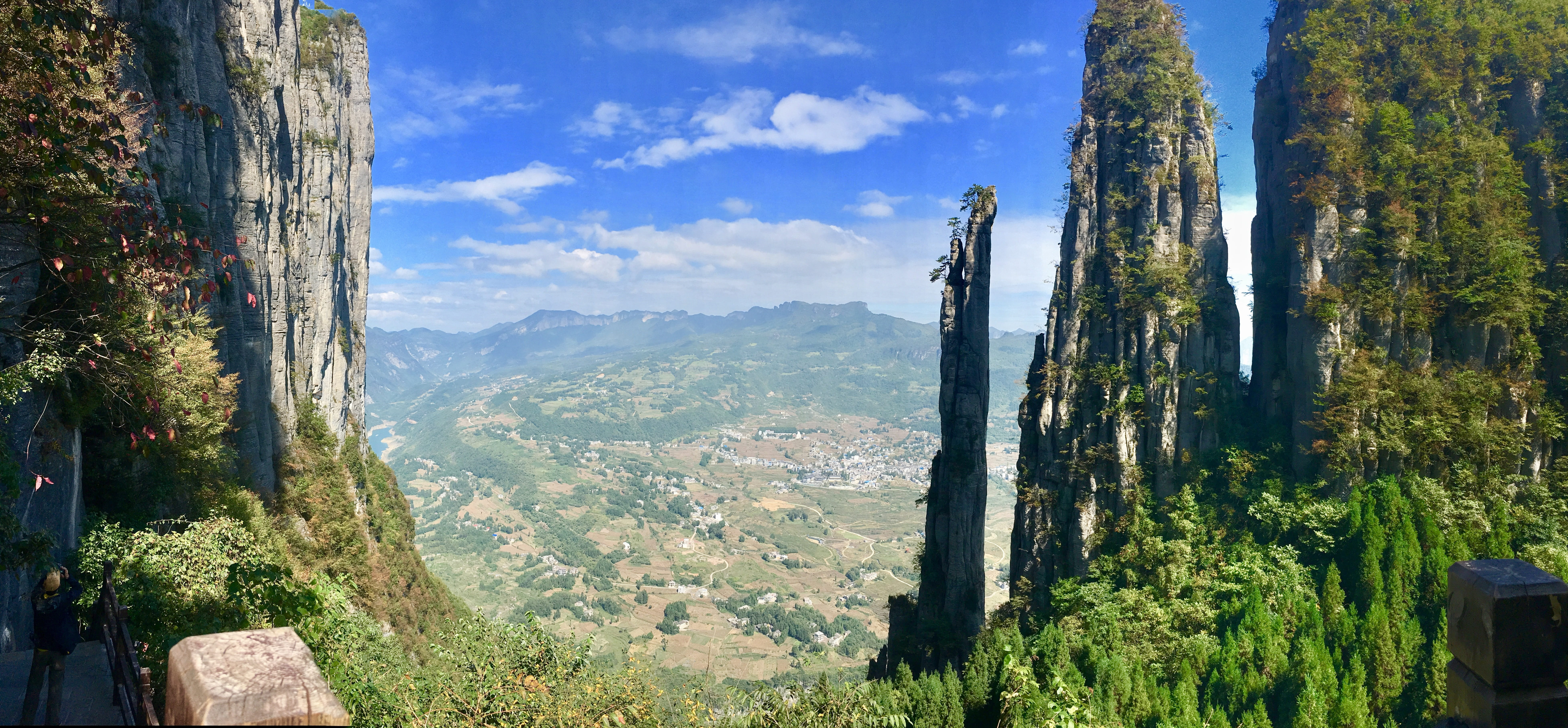
Enshi Grand Canyon in September 2016

Enshi Grand Canyon (Chinese: 恩施大峡谷) is a natural scenic spot in Enshi, Hubei, China. It is located in the Qing River Basin, adjacent to the world's deepest sinkhole Xiaozhai Tiankeng. The total length of the canyon is about 35 kilometers, and almost all kinds of forms of karst landforms can be found, including cliffs, peak pillars, sinkholes, solutional caves, natural arches, subterranean rivers, hanging valleys, etc., constituting a rare three-dimensional karst landform. The Enshi Grand Canyon is under the management of the Enshi Grand Canyon Scenic Area Management Office, Enshi Mufu Office.

== History ==
In order to promote the rapid development of tourism in the region, the State Municipal Committee and the State Municipal Government decided to establish the Mufu Office, and on December 10, 2008, the Enshi Mufu Office was formally established and used two names, the Enshi Grand Canyon Scenic Area Management Office and the Enshi Mufu Office, ushering in a new development opportunity for the Enshi Grand Canyon.

== Legend ==
It is said that the single tower of rock was bestowed by a deity to the people as a stick of incense, which could be lighted when help was needed from the gods.

== Gallery ==
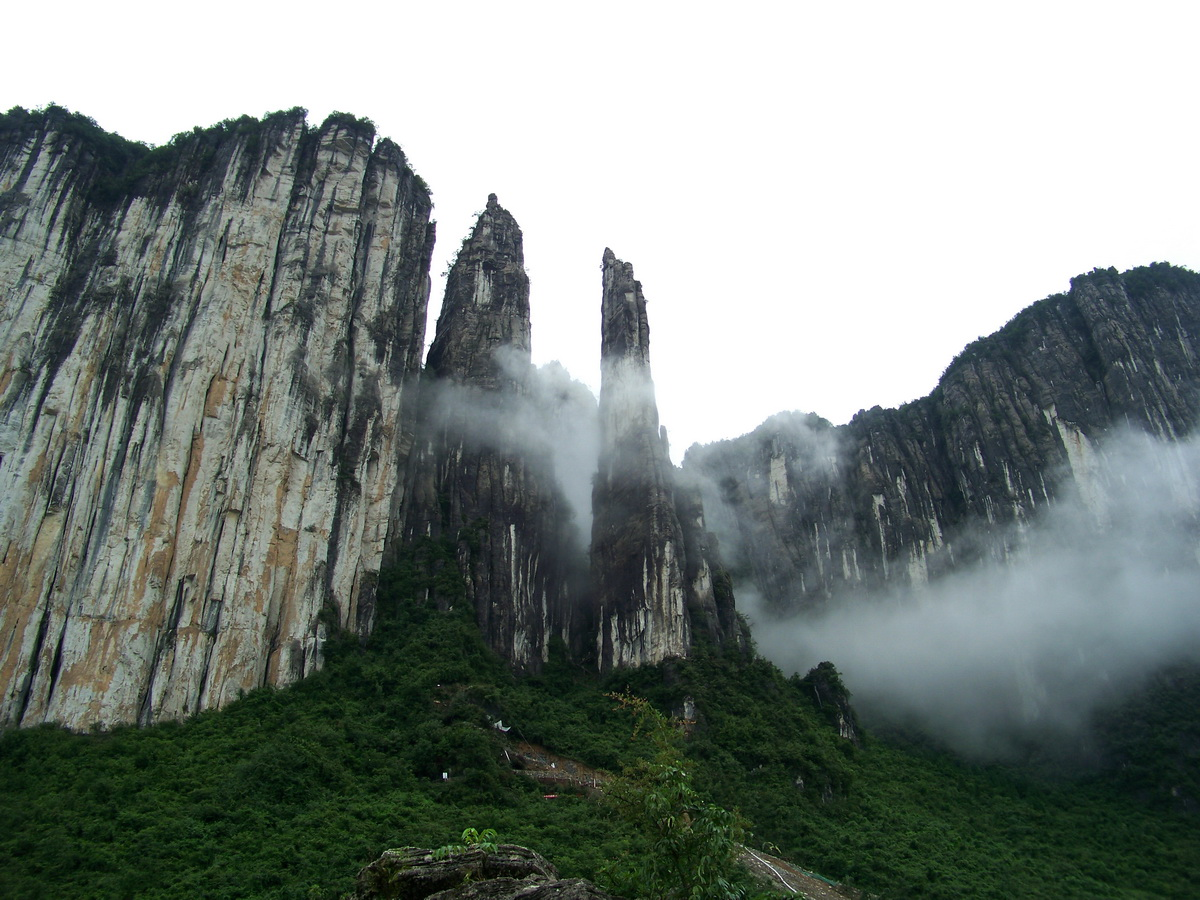
View of the Enshi Grand Canyon

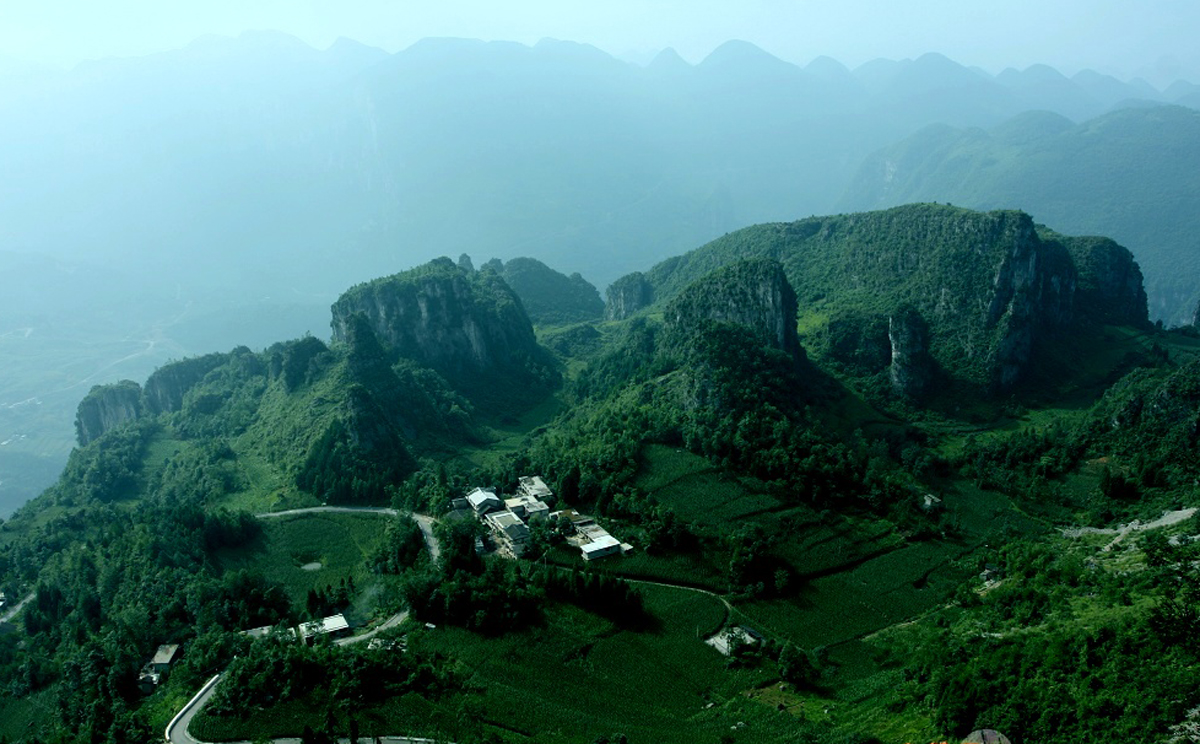
Hanging valley in the Enshi Grand Canyon

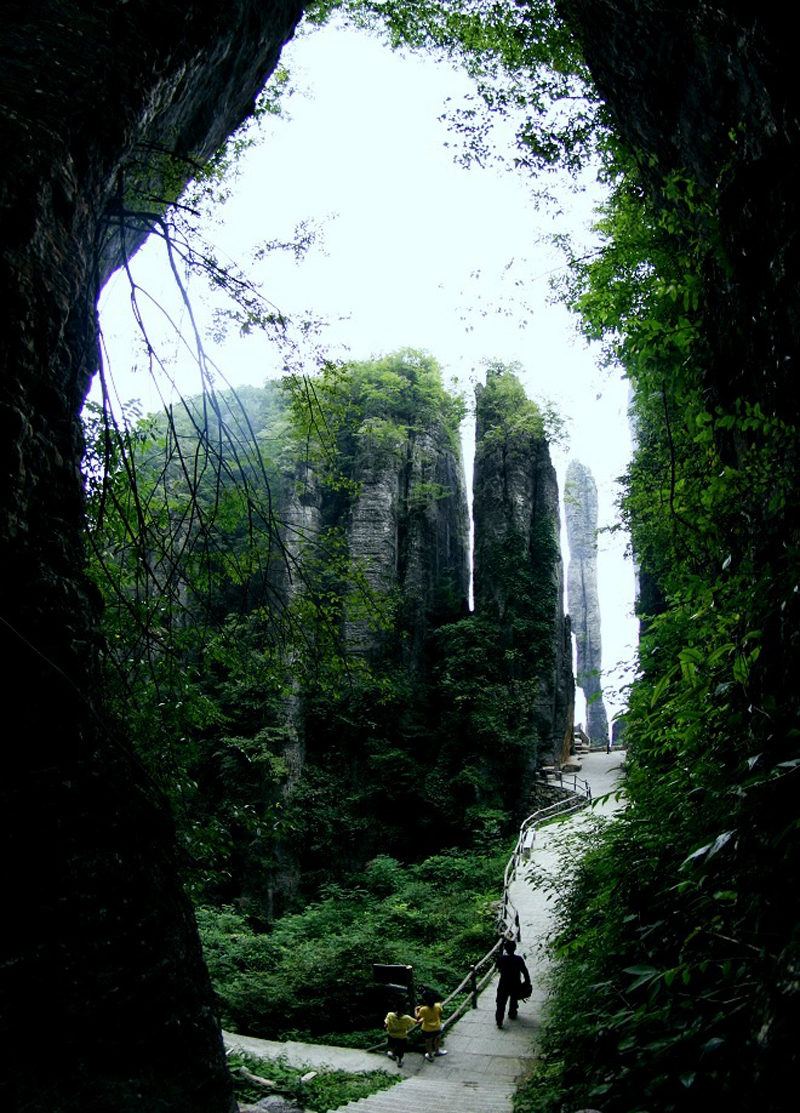
Cave in the Enshi Grand Canyon

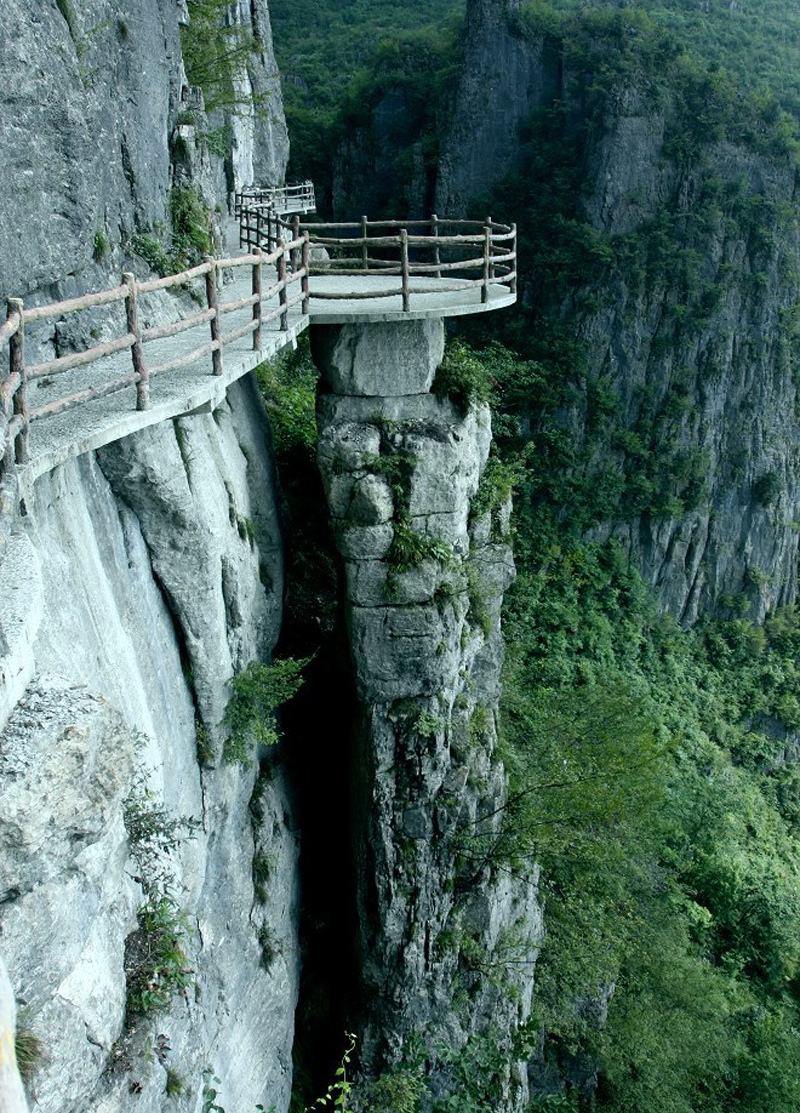
Walking platform on the side of a cliff

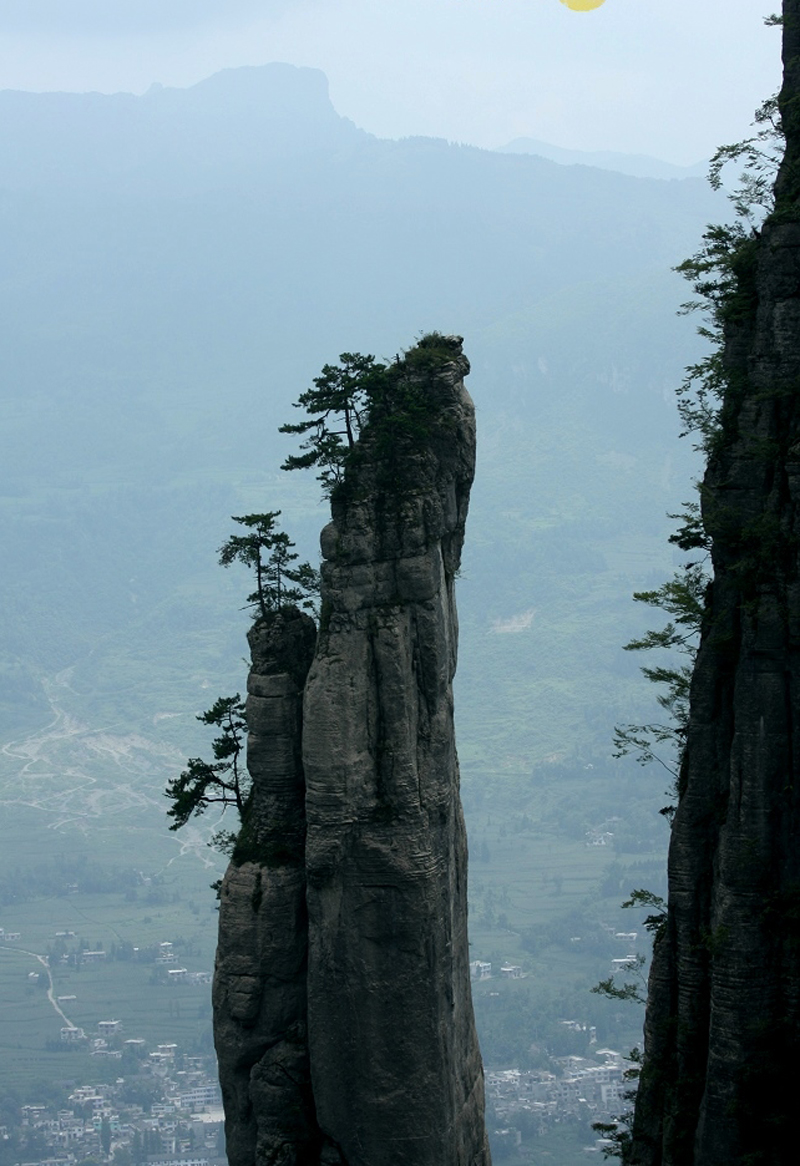
Peak pillar with the valley in the background
