= Eryue =

Second month of the Chinese calendar

Èryuè

Chinese name
- Chinese: 二月
- Hanyu Pinyin: Èryuè
Transcriptions
Standard Mandarin
- Hanyu Pinyin: Èryuè

Korean name
- Hangul: 이월
- Hanja: 二月
Transcriptions
- Revised Romanization: Iwol

Traditional Korean name
- Hangul: 토끼달
- Hanja: 卯月
Transcriptions
- Revised Romanization: Tokkidal

Japanese name
- Kanji: 二月
- Kana: にがつ
Transcriptions
- Romanization: Nigatsu

Traditional Japanese name
- Kanji: 如月
- Kana: きさらぎ
Transcriptions
- Romanization: Kisaragi

Èryuè (Chinese: 二月) is the second month of the Chinese calendar and calendars based on it such as the Japanese calendar, Korean calendar and Vietnamese calendar. It follows Zhēngyuè and precedes Sānyuè. It is known in Japanese as Nigatsu (Japanese: 二月) or traditionally Kisaragi (Japanese: 如月), and in Korean as Iwol (Korean: 이월; Hanja: 二月) or traditionally Tokkidal (Korean: 토끼달; Hanja: 卯月). All of these words can also refer to the month of February in the Gregorian calendar.

In the Tenpō calendar, the last official version of the Japanese calendar, the second month must always include the spring equinox.

== Names ==
In Mandarin Chinese, some of the traditional names of the month include xìngyuè (Chinese: 杏月), rúyuè (Chinese: 如月), lìyuè (Chinese: 麗月／丽月), and huāyuè (Chinese: 花月).

In Japanese, the month is known as nigatsu (Japanese: 二月) or traditionally kisaragi (Japanese: 如月). The earliest attestation of kisaragi is as a reading of 春分 in the Maeda manuscript of the Nihon Shoki:

春分(キサラキ)に至りて始めて氷を散(くは)るなり

On reaching kisaraki, they began to distribute the ice.

— Nihon Shoki, book 11, 62nd year of Emperor Nintoku (Maeda manuscript reading)

Several etymologies have been proposed for kisaragi. According to the 12th century poet Fujiwara no Kiyosuke, the alternative spelling 衣更着, from 衣 (kinu, "robes, clothing") + 更 (sara, "again, more") + 着 (ki, "wearing"), points to kisaragi being a contraction of kinusaragi, referring to the many layers people wore in cold weather. However, some sources note that the spelling Japanese: 衣更着 only arose in the late Heian period, and propose other theories about its origin. Kamo no Mabuchi connected the name with plants budding. Another theory derives it from 気更に来る, referring to one's mood improving as winter ends. James Marshall Unger suggested that it may have been borrowed from the Korean word winter (compare Middle Korean kyezúlh), although Alexander Vovin had demonstrated earlier that the two words are not derived from a common ancestor. The spelling 如月 is borrowed from Middle Chinese.

In Okinawa, the season around the second and third lunar months, before the onset of the rainy season, is called urizun (うりずん). The name may derive from 潤い初め, meaning 'the beginning of moistening'.

== Observances ==
- The Longtaitou Festival is held on the 2nd day of the 2nd month.
- Kinen-sai was traditionally celebrated on the 4th day of the 2nd month.
- Higan is celebrated twice a year, during the week centered around the spring equinox and the autumn equinox.

== Dates ==
Below is a list of the start and end dates of Èryuè in the Gregorian calendar. Because the 1-hour difference between China and Japan/Korea occasionally affects the date on which a new moon occurs, the dates below can differ from those of the Japanese and Korean calendars.

Dates of Èryuè
Year	First day	Last day
2016	9 March	6 April
2017	26 February	27 March
2018	17 March	15 April
2019	7 March	4 April
2020	23 February	23 March
2021	13 March	11 April
2022	3 March	31 March
2023	20 February	21 March
2023 (leap)	22 March	19 April
2024	10 March	8 April
2025	28 February	28 March
2026	19 March	16 April
2027	8 March	6 April
2028	25 February	25 March
2029	15 March	13 April
2030	4 March	2 April
2031	21 February	22 March
2032	12 March	9 April
2033	1 March	30 March
2034	20 March	18 April
2035	10 March	7 April
2036	27 February	27 March
