= Phreatic line =

The top flow line of a saturated soil mass below which seepage takes place, is called the Phreatic line.

Hydrostatic pressure acts below the phreatic line whereas atmospheric pressure exists above the phreatic line. This line separates a saturated soil mass from an unsaturated soil mass. It is not an equipotential line, but a flow line.

For an earthen dam, the phreatic line approximately assumes the shape of a parabola.

== See also ==
- Phreatic
- Embankment dam
