= Longtaitou Festival =

Traditional Chinese Festival

Longtaitou
- Observed by: China
- Date: Second day of the second month of the Chinese calendar
- 2025 date: 1 March
- 2026 date: 20 March
- 2027 date: 9 March
- 2028 date: 26 February
- Frequency: Annual

Longtaitou Festival
- Traditional Chinese: 龍抬頭
- Simplified Chinese: 龙抬头
Transcriptions
Standard Mandarin
- Hanyu Pinyin: lóng táitóu
Wu
- Suzhounese: lon^{2} de^{2} deu^{2}
Yue: Cantonese
- Jyutping: lung4 toi4 tau4

The Longtaitou Festival (traditional Chinese: 龍抬頭; simplified Chinese: 龙抬头; pinyin: Lóng Táitóu), conflated with the Zhonghe Festival beginning one day earlier (traditional Chinese: 中和節; simplified Chinese: 中和节), is a traditional Chinese festival held on the second day of the second month of the Chinese calendar. Its name means "Dragon raising its head" because the dragon was regarded as the deity in charge of rain, an important factor in ancient agriculture. The festival is sometimes simply called "Second-month Second" (二月二) for short.

The festival was established in the Yuan dynasty. It is celebrated around the time of Jingzhe, one of the 24 solar terms. The name jingzhe (驚蟄) has the meaning of awakening of the hibernated (implying insects). Jing (驚) means "startling", and zhe (蟄) refers to the hibernated (insects). This is the time during which the hibernating insects begin to wake up at the beginning of early spring, which is often accompanied by the arrival of the first rains, meaning the weather is getting warm. Longtaitou Festival is an important worship ritual of wishing for good harvest in the coming months. In addition to paying homage to the Dragon King, Tu Di Gong is also worshipped on Double Second, his birthday. Another ancient practice to celebrate Longtaitou Festival was to get rid of insect pests in homes by cooking foods with recognized insect repelling effects.

Today, Longtaitou Festival is celebrated in various ways, most of which are still identical to those practiced in the ancient times, including eating foods named after dragons: "dragon scale pancakes" (龍鱗餅; a kind of spring pancake), "dragon teeth" (jiaozi), dragon beard noodles, and longan congee (the word "longan" literally means "dragon eye"). It is a traditional day for people to get a haircut, after month-long time without cutting hair in January for Chinese New Year. Women and children carry perfume bags filled with the powder of ground fragrant herbs for good fortune, though they are no longer used as insect repellent as in ancient times.

In some places, it is also celebrated with a dragon dance.

Another celebration is that Longtaitou Festival is the first day of the Taihao (太昊) temple fair that lasts until the third day of the third month of the Chinese calendar. The fair is a celebration of ancestral deities Fuxi and Nüwa, and the Longtaitou Festival marks the beginning of this celebration.

There were ancient traditions practiced during the festival, some of which are no longer part of the modern celebrations, including:

- Women should not practice sewing because needles could puncture the dragon's eyes.
- Plant ashes were spread outside the house, inside the house, and around the water jug, to symbolize inviting the dragon to provide enough rain for good harvests.
- In parts of southern China it is considered the birthday of Tudi Gong (土地公誕辰), and people used to celebrate with firecrackers.
- Due to worship of the dragon, some people eat food with the word "dragon" to bring good luck and good weather all year round.

The Zhonghe Festival was an official festival and holiday in the Tang dynasty, celebrated on the day before the Longtaitou Festival: on the first day of the second month of the Chinese calendar. It continued to be observed into the Qing dynasty. The first day of the second traditional Chinese month is also considered the birthday of the Taoist Sun God.

== See also ==
- Chunshe (Spring Community Day)
- "If you get a haircut during the first lunar month, your maternal uncle will die." (正月剪頭死舅舅)
