= Embankment dam =

Type of artificial dam

An embankment dam is a large artificial dam. It is typically created by the placement and compaction of a complex semi-plastic mound of various compositions of soil or rock. It has a water-resistant natural covering for its surface and may feature a dense, watertight core to resist surface or seepage erosion. Such a dam is composed of fragmented independent material particles. The friction and interaction of particles binds the particles together into a stable mass rather than by the use of a cementing substance.

== Types ==
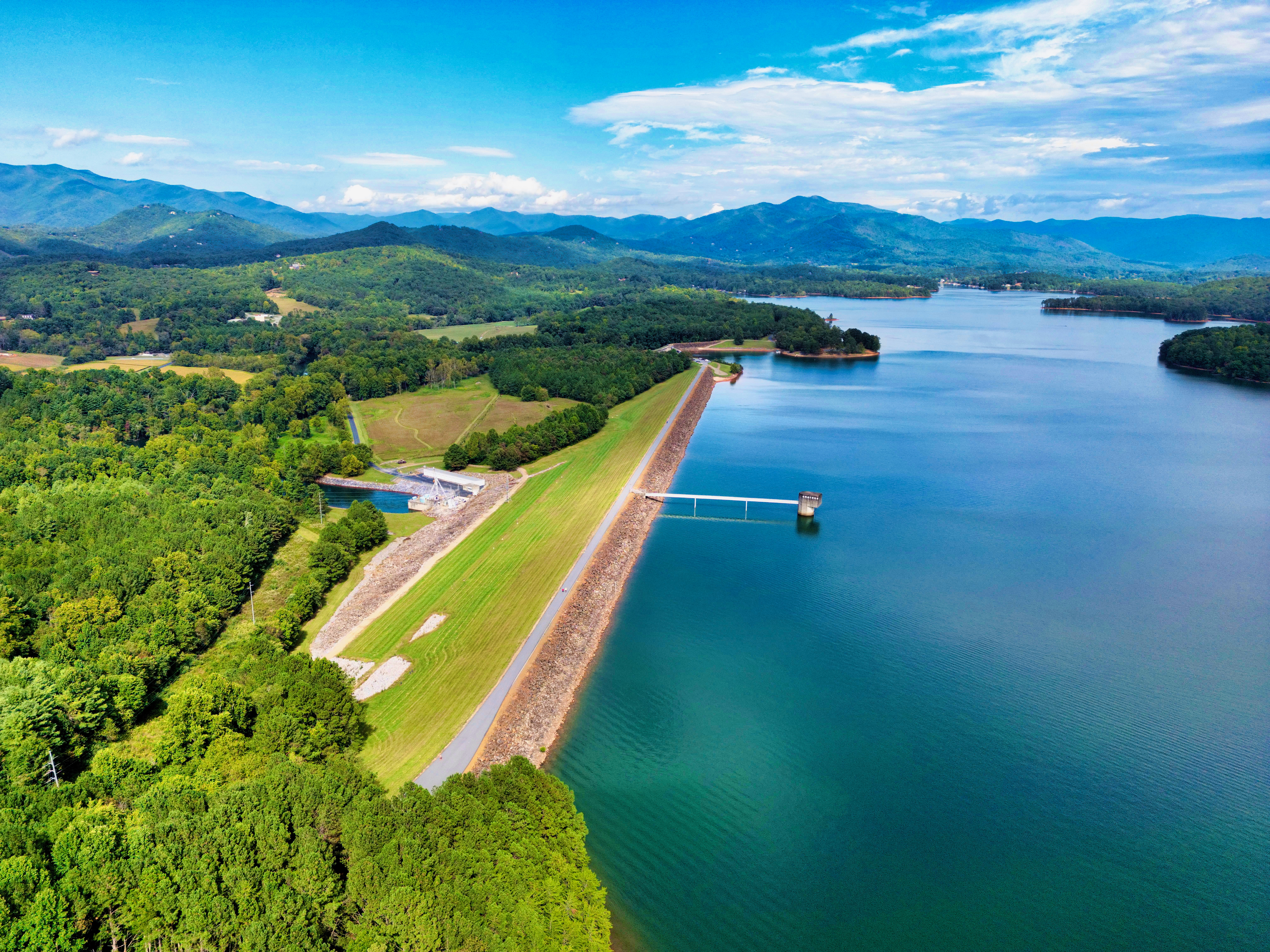
Chatuge Dam, North Carolina

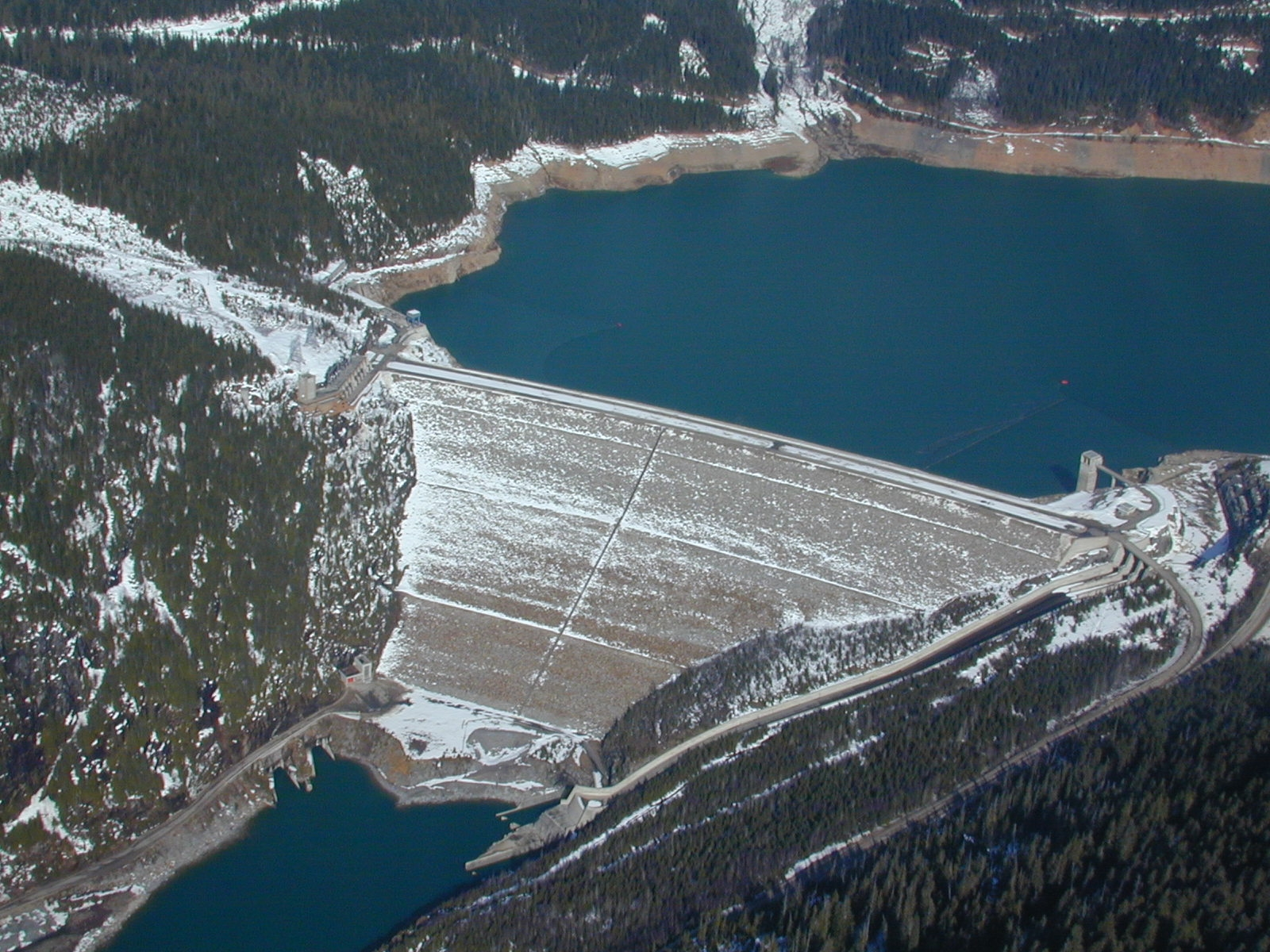
The Mica Dam, Canada

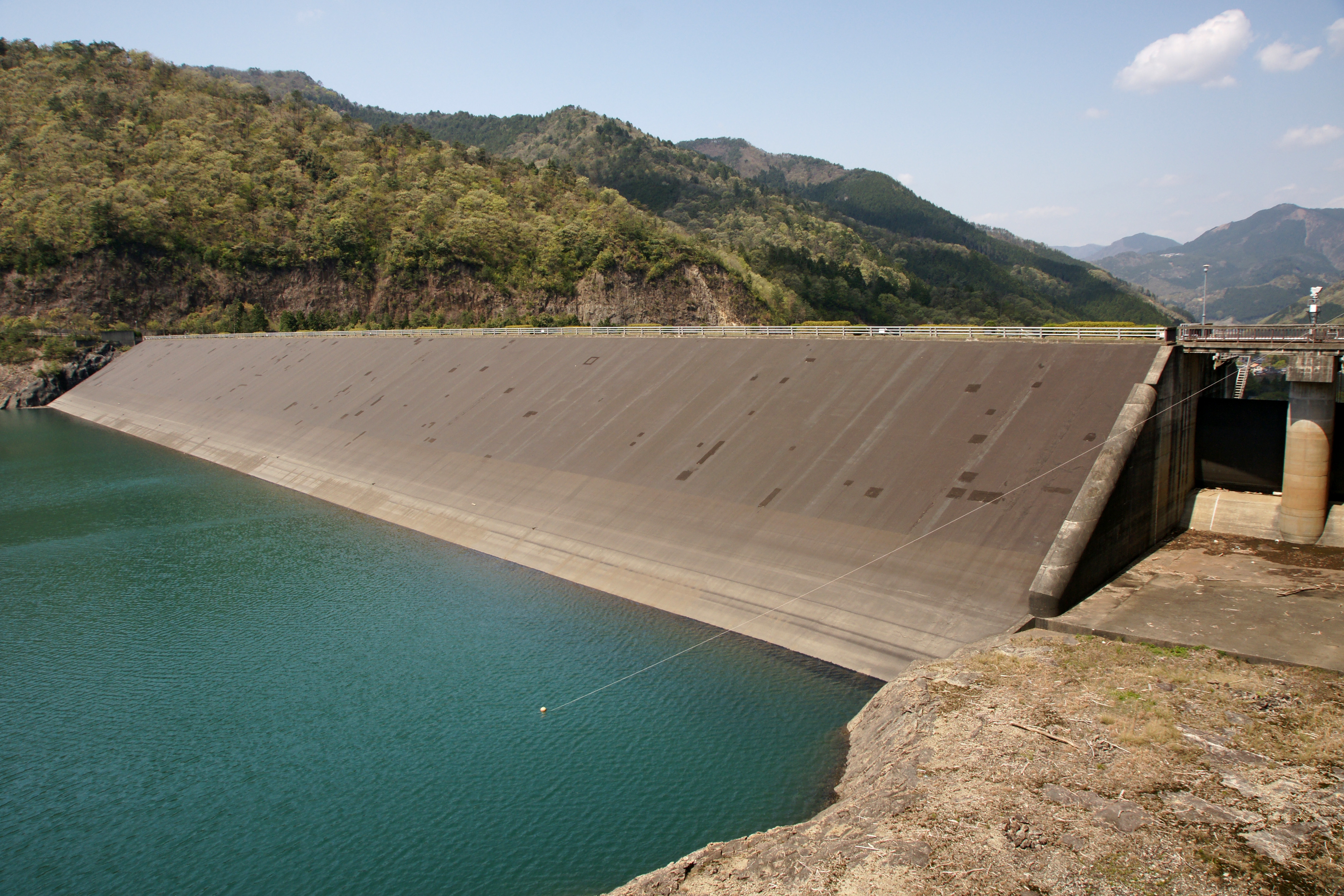
Tataragi Dam, Asago, Hyōgo Prefecture, Japan

Embankment dams come in two types: the earth-filled dam (also called an earthen dam or terrain dam) made of compacted earth, and the rock-filled dam. A cross-section of an embankment dam shows a shape like a bank, or hill. Most have a central section or core composed of an impermeable material to stop water from seeping through the dam. The core can be of clay, concrete, or asphalt concrete. This type of dam is a good choice for sites with wide valleys. They can be built on hard rock or softer soils. For a rock-fill dam, rock-fill is blasted using explosives to break the rock. Additionally, the rock pieces may need to be crushed into smaller grades to get the right range of size for use in an embankment dam.

=== Earth-fill dams ===
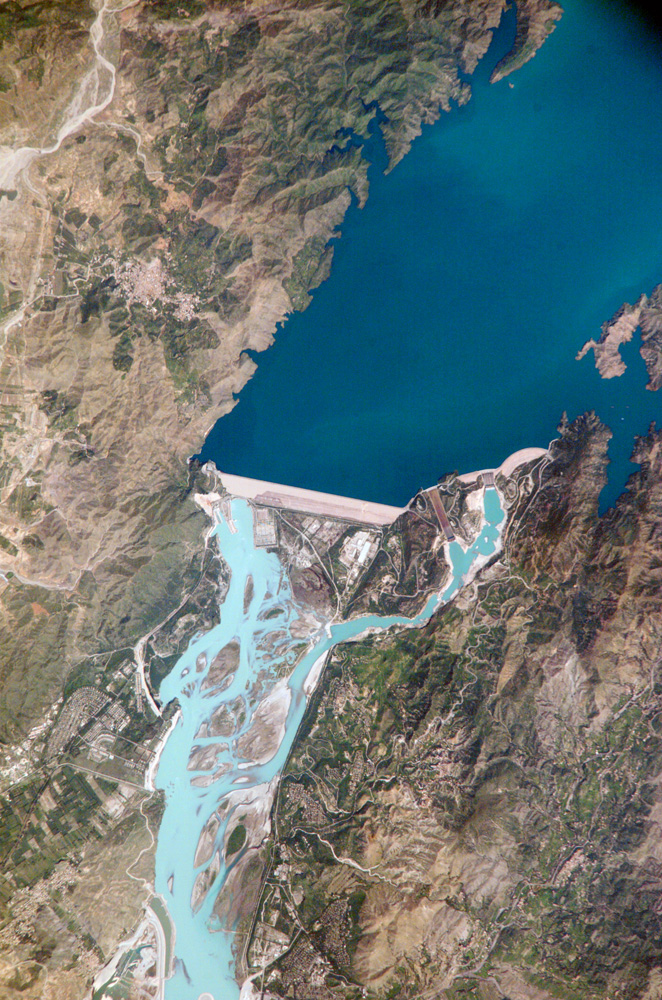
Tarbela Dam, in Pakistan, is the largest earth-filled dam in the world.

Earth-fill dams, also called earthen dams, rolled-earth dams or earth dams, are constructed as a simple embankment of well-compacted earth. A homogeneous rolled-earth dam is entirely constructed of one type of material but may contain a drain layer to collect seep water. A zoned-earth dam has distinct parts or zones of dissimilar material, typically a shell of locally plentiful material with a watertight clay core. Modern zoned-earth embankments employ filter and drain zones to collect and remove seep water and preserve the integrity of the downstream shell zone. An outdated method of zoned earth dam construction used a hydraulic fill to produce a watertight core. Rolled-earth dams may also employ a watertight facing or core in the manner of a rock-fill dam. The frozen-core dam is a temporary earth dam occasionally used in high latitudes by circulating a coolant through pipes inside the dam to maintain a watertight region of permafrost within it.

Because earthen dams can be constructed from local materials, they can be cost-effective in regions where the cost of producing or bringing in concrete would be prohibitive. Tarbela Dam, one of the largest man-made structures in the world, is a large earthen-fill dam on the Indus River in Pakistan, about 50 km (31 mi) northwest of Islamabad.

=== Rock-fill embankment dams ===
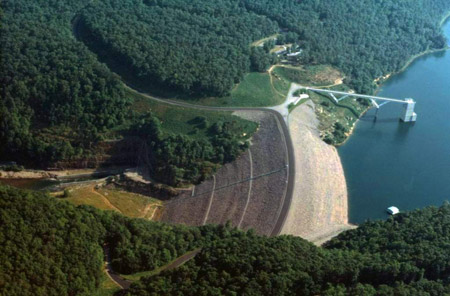
Gathright Dam in Virginia is a rock-fill embankment dam.

Rock-fill dams are embankments of compacted free-draining granular earth with an impervious zone. The earth used often contains a high percentage of large particles, hence the term rock-fill. The impervious zone may be on the upstream face and made of masonry, concrete, plastic membrane, steel sheet piles, timber or other material. The impervious zone may also be inside the embankment, in which case it is referred to as a "core". In the instances where clay is used as the impervious material, the dam is referred to as a "composite" dam. To prevent internal erosion of clay into the rock fill due to seepage forces, the core is separated using a filter. Filters are specifically graded soil designed to prevent the migration of fine grain soil particles. When suitable building material is at hand, transport is minimized, leading to cost savings during construction. Rock-fill dams are resistant to damage from earthquakes. However, inadequate quality control during construction can lead to poor compaction and sand in the embankment which can lead to liquefaction of the rock-fill during an earthquake. Liquefaction potential can be reduced by keeping susceptible material from being saturated, and by providing adequate compaction during construction. An example of a rock-fill dam is New Melones Dam in California or the Fierza Dam in Albania.

A core that is growing in popularity is asphalt concrete. The majority of such dams are built with rock and/or gravel as the primary fill. Almost 100 dams of this design have now been built worldwide since the first such dam was completed in 1962. All asphalt-concrete core dams built so far have an excellent performance record. The type of asphalt used is a viscoelastic-plastic material that can adjust to the movements and deformations imposed on the embankment as a whole, and to settlement of the foundation. The flexible properties of the asphalt make such dams especially suited to earthquake regions.

For the Moglicë Hydro Power Plant in Albania the Norwegian power company Statkraft built an asphalt-core rock-fill dam. Upon completion in 2018 the 320 m long, 150 m high and 460 m wide dam is anticipated to be the world's highest of its kind.

==== Concrete-face rock-fill dams ====
A concrete-face rock-fill dam (CFRD) is a rock-fill dam with concrete slabs on its upstream face. This design provides the concrete slab as an impervious wall to prevent leakage and also a structure without concern for uplift pressure. In addition, the CFRD design is flexible for topography, faster to construct and less costly than earth-fill dams. The CFRD concept originated during the California Gold Rush in the 1860s when miners constructed rock-fill timber-face dams for sluice operations. The timber was later replaced by concrete as the design was applied to irrigation and power schemes. As CFRD designs grew in height during the 1960s, the fill was compacted and the slab's horizontal and vertical joints were replaced with improved vertical joints. In the last few decades, design has become popular.

The tallest CFRD in the world is the 233 m-tall (764 ft) Shuibuya Dam in China, completed in 2008.

== Safety ==
The building of a dam and the filling of the reservoir behind it places a new weight on the floor and sides of a valley. The stress of the water increases linearly with its depth. Water also pushes against the upstream face of the dam, a nonrigid structure that under stress behaves semiplastically, and causes greater need for adjustment (flexibility) near the base of the dam than at shallower water levels. Thus the stress level of the dam must be calculated in advance of building to ensure that its break level threshold is not exceeded.

Overtopping or overflow of an embankment dam beyond its spillway capacity will cause its eventual failure. The erosion of the dam's material by overtopping runoff will remove masses of material whose weight holds the dam in place and against the hydraulic forces acting to move the dam. Even a small sustained overtopping flow can remove thousands of tons of overburden soil from the mass of the dam within hours. The removal of this mass unbalances the forces that stabilize the dam against its reservoir as the mass of water still impounded behind the dam presses against the lightened mass of the embankment, made lighter by surface erosion. As the mass of the dam erodes, the force exerted by the reservoir begins to move the entire structure. The embankment, having almost no elastic strength, would begin to break into separate pieces, allowing the impounded reservoir water to flow between them, eroding and removing even more material as it passes through. In the final stages of failure, the remaining pieces of the embankment would offer almost no resistance to the flow of the water and continue to fracture into smaller and smaller sections of earth or rock until they disintegrate into a thick suspension of earth, rocks and water.

Therefore, safety requirements for the spillway are high, and require it to be capable of containing a maximum flood stage. It is common for its specifications to be written such that it can contain at least a one-hundred-year flood. A number of embankment dam overtopping protection systems were developed in the early 21st century. These techniques include concrete overtopping protection systems, timber cribs, sheet-piles, riprap and gabions, Reinforced Earth, minimum energy loss weirs, embankment overflow stepped spillways, and precast concrete block protection systems.

All dams are prone to seepage underneath the dam, but embankment dams are prone to seepage through the dam as well; for example, the Usoi landslide dam leaks 35-80 cubic meters per second. Sufficiently fast seepage can dislodge a dam's component particles, which results in faster seepage, which turns into a runaway feedback loop that can destroy the dam in a piping-type failure. Seepage monitoring is therefore an essential safety consideration.

== See also ==
- Earth structure
- Gravity dam
- List of largest dams in the world
- Phreatic line
- Teton Dam – an earthen dam that suffered a catastrophic dam failure in 1976
