= Dongping Dam =

- Location within China
- Official name: 洞坪电站
- Country: China
- Location: Wanjia Township, Xuan'en County
- Coordinates: 30°08′35″N 109°37′2″E
- Status: Operational
- Construction began: 2000
- Opening date: 2006
- Owners: Hubei Xuan’en Dongping Hydropower Co., Ltd

Dam and spillways
- Type of dam: Arch
- Height: 135 m (443 ft)

Reservoir
- Total capacity: 336,000,000 m^{3} (272,000 acre⋅ft)
- Surface area: 8.12 km^{2} (3 sq mi)

Power Station
- Commission date: 2006
- Hydraulic head: 90 m (295 ft) (rated)
- Turbines: 2 x 55 MW Francis-type
- Installed capacity: 110 MW
- Annual generation: 322 GWh

The Dongping Dam is an arch dam on the Zhongjian River (忠建河), a right tributary of the Qing River, in Xuan'en County, Hubei Province, China. The primary purpose of the dam is hydroelectric power generation and it supports a 110 MW power station consisting of two 55 MW Francis turbine-generators. The 135-metre-tall (443 ft) arch dam withholds a reservoir of 336,000,000 m^{3} (272,000 acre⋅ft). Construction began in 2000, the first generator was operational in 2005 and the project completed in 2006.

== See also ==
- List of dams and reservoirs in China
- List of major power stations in Hubei
