= Dragon beard noodles =

- Type: Noodle
- Place of origin: China
- Region or state: Shandong province

Dragon beard noodles
- Traditional Chinese: 龍鬚麵
- Simplified Chinese: 龙须面
- Literal meaning: "Dragon Beard Noodles"
Transcriptions
Standard Mandarin
- Hanyu Pinyin: lóng xū miàn

Dragon beard noodles (simplified Chinese: 龙须面; traditional Chinese: 龍鬚麵) are a variety of noodle from Shandong province in China. They derive their name from their long, thin appearance, said to resemble the beard of a Chinese dragon. They are traditionally eaten during the Longtaitou Festival, which occurs on the second day of the second month of the Chinese calendar. There is a folk custom called "peeling the dragon skin" (pinyin: “bolongpi”).

== History ==
The noodles are believed to have been invented by a chef working for the emperor during the Ming dynasty. During lichun, the chef made some unusually long and thin noodles which delighted the emperor, and later became popular among peasants as well. Because of their association with dragons, the noodles began to be eaten during the Longtaitou (lit. "dragon raising its head") festival, which celebrates dragons and the role they play in bringing the Spring rains.

== Manufacturing Steps ==
1. Dough making
2. Pulling into noodles
3. Deep frying
