= Shuibuya Dam =

- Location within China
- Location: Badong County
- Coordinates: 30.4384°N 110.3377°E
- Construction began: 2002
- Opening date: 2008
- Construction cost: US$1.5 billion
- Operator: Hubei Qingjiang Hydroelectric Development

Dam and spillways
- Impounds: Qingjiang River
- Height: 233 m (764 ft)
- Length: 660 m (2,170 ft)
- Spillway capacity: 16,300 m^{3}/s (580,000 cu ft/s)

Reservoir
- Creates: Shuibuya Reservoir
- Total capacity: 4,580,000,000 m^{3} (3,710,000 acre⋅ft)
- Catchment area: 10,860 km^{2} (4,190 sq mi)

Power Station
- Commission date: 2007-2008
- Type: Conventional
- Turbines: 4 × 460 MW Francis-type
- Installed capacity: 1,840 MW
- Annual generation: 3,985 GWh

The Shuibuya Dam is a concrete-face rock-fill embankment dam on the Qingjiang River in Badong County, Enshi, Hubei Province, China. The purpose of the dam is mainly hydroelectricity but it also promotes flood control, navigation, tourism and fishery. At 233 m (764 ft) tall and containing 15,640,000 m^{3} (20,460,000 cu yd) of material, it is the tallest concrete face rock-fill dam in the world.

== History ==
Construction on the Shuibuya Dam was authorized in January 2002 and began soon thereafter. By October 2002, the Qingjiang River had been diverted. On August 12, 2006, the dam reached its maximum height of 233 m (764 ft) and by July 2007, its first hydroelectricity generator was operational. In March 2008, the third generator was operational and the dam along with its power station were completed later in 2008. A total of 13,967 people were relocated during construction.

The dam was designed by CWRC and built by Hubei Qingjiang Shuibuya Project Construction Company in addition to the Gezhouba Group Company, Jiangnan Water Resource & Hydropower Engineering Co. and China Water Resource & Hydropower No. 14 Bureau. Construction was supervised by Huadong Hydropower Engineering Consultancy Co., Zhongnan Co. and China Water Resource & Hydropower Engineering Consultancy.

== Specifications ==
The Shuibuya Dam is a 233 m (764 ft) tall and 660 m (2,170 ft) long concrete-face rock-fill embankment dam on the Qingjiang River. The dam's maximum height above sea level is 409 m (1,342 ft). It is made of 15,640,000 m^{3} (20,460,000 cu yd) of material. The dam includes a bank-type spillway controlled by five 14 m × 21.8 m (46 ft × 72 ft) gates that can discharge 16,300 m^{3}/s (580,000 cu ft/s). The dam's power station contains four 460 MW turbines units that are housed in an underground power plant.

== See also ==
- List of power stations in China
