= Enshi City =

Enshi 恩施市 · Enrshiv · Entshil Enshih
- County-level city
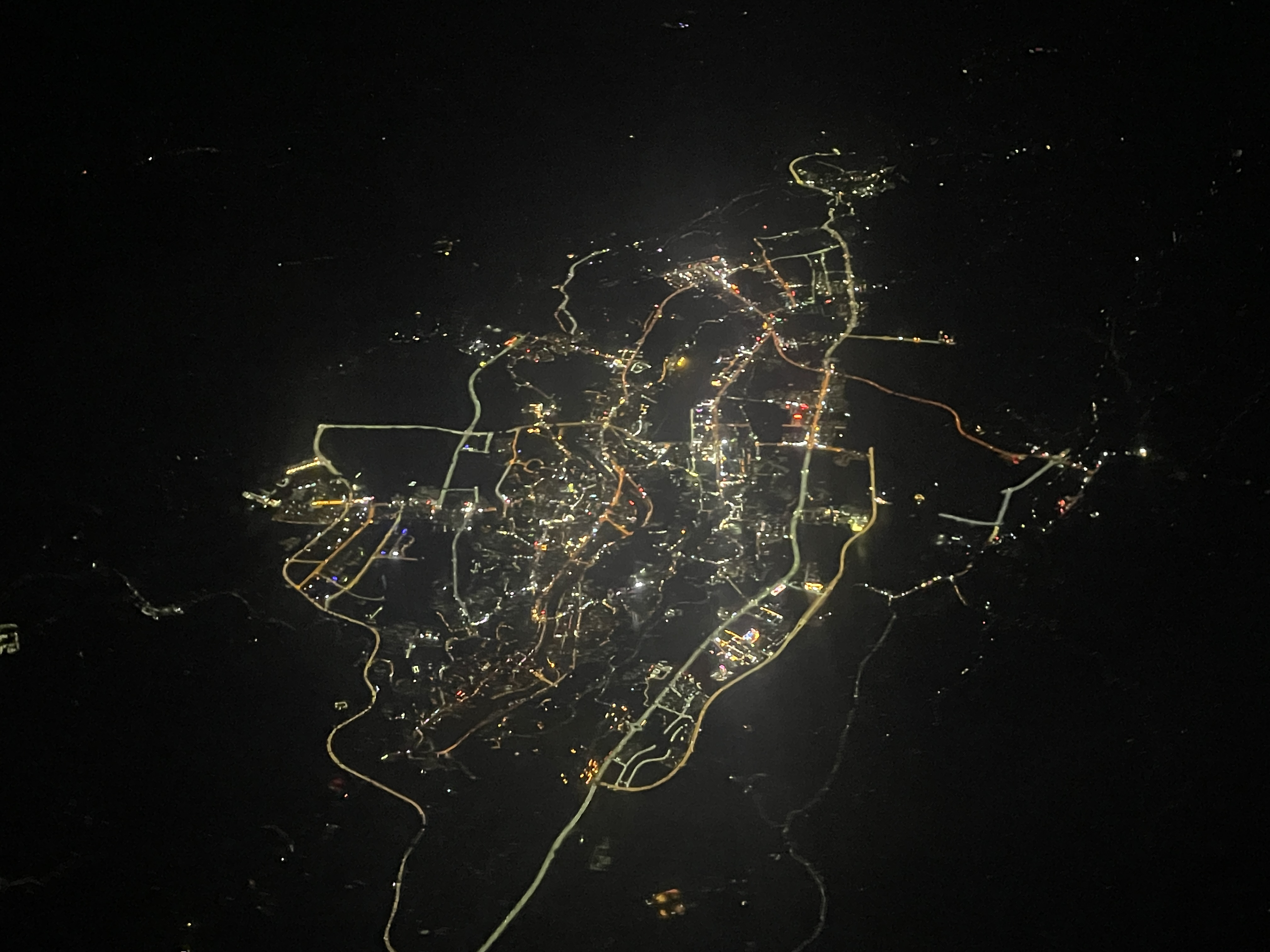
- Aerial view of the city at night

- Location in Hubei
- Coordinates (Enshi City government): 30°17′42″N 109°28′47″E
- Country: China
- Province: Hubei
- Autonomous prefecture: Enshi
- Municipal seat: Xiaoduchuan Subdistrict

Area
  - County-level city: 3,971.58 km^{2} (1,533.44 sq mi)
  - Urban: 52.00 km^{2} (20.08 sq mi)
- Elevation: 420 m (1,380 ft)

Population (2020 census)
  - County-level city: 836,781
  - Estimate (2017): 857,000
  - Density: 210.692/km^{2} (545.690/sq mi)
  - Urban: 260,700
- Time zone: UTC+8 (China Standard)
- Postal code: 445000
- Area code: 0718
- Website: www.es.gov.cn

Enshi
- Chinese: 恩施
- Postal: Enshih
Transcriptions
Standard Mandarin
- Hanyu Pinyin: Ēnshī
- Wade–Giles: En^{1}-shih^{1}

Former name
- Chinese: 施南
- Postal: Shihnan
Transcriptions
Standard Mandarin
- Hanyu Pinyin: Shīnán
- Wade–Giles: Shih^{1}-nan^{2}

Enshi (Chinese: 恩施; pinyin: Ēnshī) is a county-level city in and the seat of Enshi Tujia and Miao Autonomous Prefecture in western Hubei province, China. The prefecture's legislature, executive and judiciary are seated here, as well as its CPC and public security bureau.

The entire county-level city of Enshi has an area of 3,967 square kilometres (1,532 sq mi) and a population of 780,000.

== History ==
The oldest records of Enshi date the Spring and Autumn period of 776 BC. At that time the area was a state known as Bazi, which lasted until 476 BC. Enshi then became a county from 475 to 221 BC, prior to it being absorbed into the Chinese dynasties during the Qi period. In 1925, the city of Enshi formed the Exi Tujia and Miao Autonomous Prefecture, which in 1935 became the Enshi Tujia and Miao Autonomous Prefecture.

== Administrative divisions ==
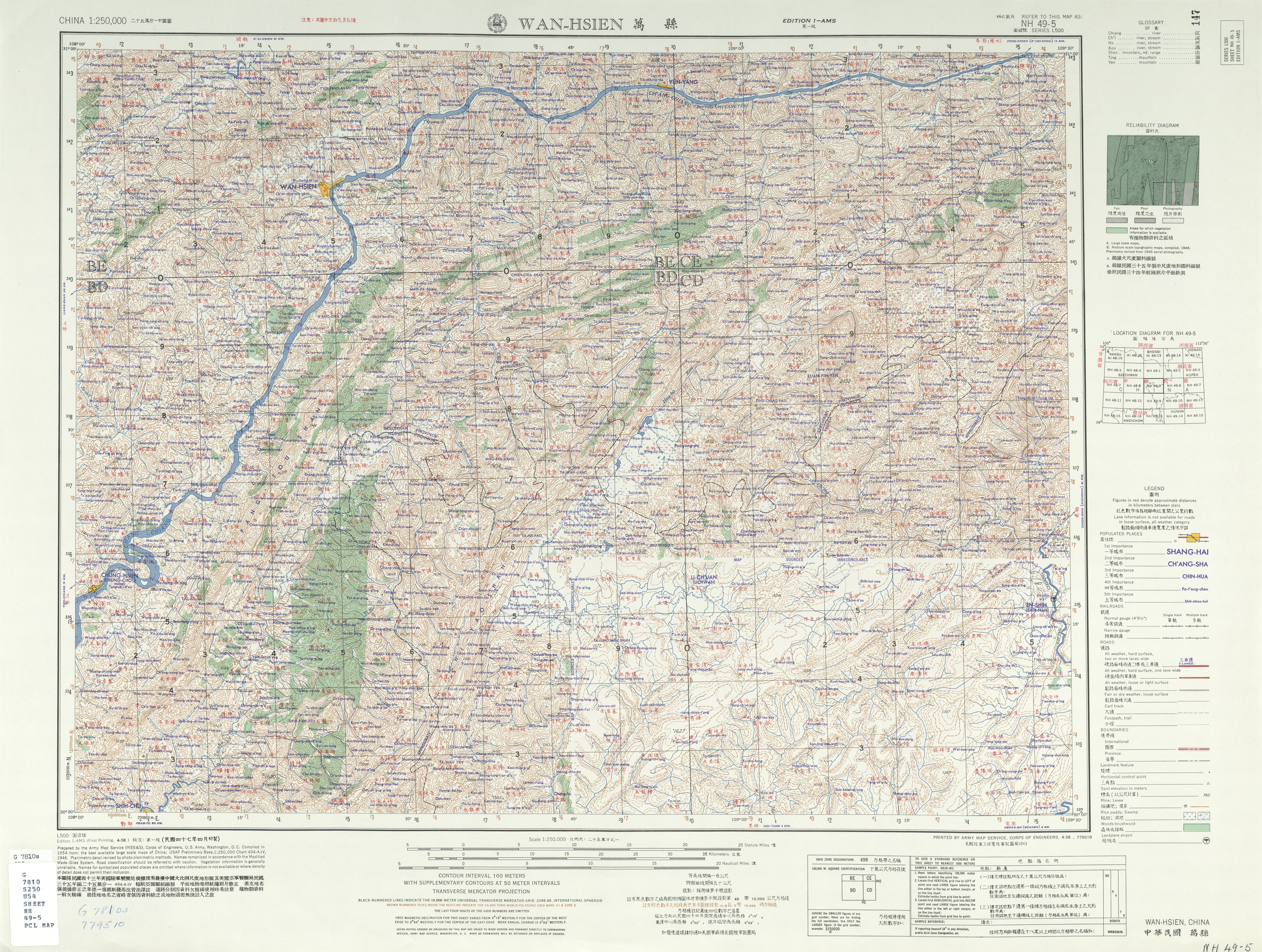
Map including Enshi (labeled as EN-SHIH (SHIH-NAN) 恩施(施南)) (1954)

Enshi City administers five subdistricts, six towns, six townships and one ethnic township:

The five subdistricts are Wuyangba Subdistrict (舞阳坝街道), Liujiaoting Subdistrict (六角亭街道), Xiaoduchuan Subdistrict (小渡船街道), Qiliping Subdistrict (七里坪街道), and Jinziba Subdistrict (金子坝街道).

The six towns are Longfeng (龙凤镇), Cuiba (崔坝镇), Banqiao (板桥镇), Baiyangping (白杨坪镇), Sancha (三岔镇), and Shengjiaba (盛家坝镇).

The six townships are Xintang Township (新塘乡), Hongtu Township (红土乡), Shadi Township (沙地乡), Taiyanghe Township (太阳河乡), Tunbao Township (屯堡乡), and Baiguo Township (白果乡).

The one ethnic township is Bajiao Dong Ethnic Township (芭蕉侗族乡).

The one township-level area is the Enshi Daxiagu Landscape Management Division (恩施大峡谷风景管理处).

== Tourism ==
Enshi City is built alongside the Qing River and is surrounded by forest-covered mountains. The city has many hotels, restaurants and spas. The food in Enshi is spicy and includes many "hot pot"-style dishes as well as smoked pork and chorizo-style sausage meat, spicy fried potatoes and lamb skewers.

There is a Forest Park in Enshi which offers views of the city as well as an amusement park.

== Climate ==
Enshi has a monsoon-influenced humid subtropical climate (Köppen Cfa), with short, cool winters, hot, humid summers, and high humidity year-round. The monthly 24-hour average temperature ranges from 5.2 °C (41.4 °F) in January to 26.5 °C (79.7 °F) in August, while the annual mean is 16.3 °C (61.3 °F). More than two-thirds of the annual precipitation of 1,424.7 millimetres (56 in) occurs from May to September. With monthly percent possible sunshine ranging from 12% in January to 50% in August, the city receives only 1,212 hours of bright sunshine annually; winter is especially overcast while July thru September is the sunniest period of the year.

Climate data for Enshi City, elevation 454 m (1,490 ft), (1991–2020 normals, extremes 1951–present)
| Month | Jan | Feb | Mar | Apr | May | Jun | Jul | Aug | Sep | Oct | Nov | Dec | Year |
|---|---|---|---|---|---|---|---|---|---|---|---|---|---|
| Record high °C (°F) | 21.2 (70.2) | 27.2 (81.0) | 33.1 (91.6) | 37.0 (98.6) | 37.2 (99.0) | 40.2 (104.4) | 40.4 (104.7) | 41.2 (106.2) | 39.1 (102.4) | 34.7 (94.5) | 27.2 (81.0) | 20.4 (68.7) | 41.2 (106.2) |
| Mean daily maximum °C (°F) | 8.7 (47.7) | 11.4 (52.5) | 16.6 (61.9) | 22.6 (72.7) | 26.3 (79.3) | 29.5 (85.1) | 32.2 (90.0) | 32.7 (90.9) | 27.9 (82.2) | 21.6 (70.9) | 16.2 (61.2) | 10.2 (50.4) | 21.3 (70.4) |
| Daily mean °C (°F) | 5.4 (41.7) | 7.5 (45.5) | 11.6 (52.9) | 16.9 (62.4) | 20.8 (69.4) | 24.2 (75.6) | 26.8 (80.2) | 26.8 (80.2) | 22.7 (72.9) | 17.2 (63.0) | 12.1 (53.8) | 6.9 (44.4) | 16.6 (61.8) |
| Mean daily minimum °C (°F) | 3.0 (37.4) | 4.8 (40.6) | 8.1 (46.6) | 13.0 (55.4) | 17.0 (62.6) | 20.5 (68.9) | 23.1 (73.6) | 22.8 (73.0) | 19.2 (66.6) | 14.4 (57.9) | 9.5 (49.1) | 4.7 (40.5) | 13.3 (56.0) |
| Record low °C (°F) | −12.3 (9.9) | −6.5 (20.3) | −1.1 (30.0) | 1.1 (34.0) | 8.3 (46.9) | 12.5 (54.5) | 15.7 (60.3) | 16.1 (61.0) | 11.2 (52.2) | 5.2 (41.4) | −0.4 (31.3) | −4.7 (23.5) | −12.3 (9.9) |
| Average precipitation mm (inches) | 32.6 (1.28) | 42.0 (1.65) | 70.7 (2.78) | 125.5 (4.94) | 181.9 (7.16) | 208.0 (8.19) | 256.8 (10.11) | 152.1 (5.99) | 134.9 (5.31) | 114.1 (4.49) | 73.5 (2.89) | 27.5 (1.08) | 1,419.6 (55.87) |
| Average precipitation days (≥ 0.1 mm) | 12.1 | 11.9 | 14.0 | 15.1 | 16.7 | 15.6 | 15.6 | 12.8 | 12.0 | 13.9 | 12.7 | 11.0 | 163.4 |
| Average snowy days | 3.2 | 1.4 | 0.4 | 0 | 0 | 0 | 0 | 0 | 0 | 0 | 0 | 0.7 | 5.7 |
| Average relative humidity (%) | 83 | 80 | 77 | 77 | 79 | 80 | 79 | 75 | 78 | 83 | 85 | 84 | 80 |
| Mean monthly sunshine hours | 41.3 | 48.8 | 84.0 | 115.0 | 125.0 | 123.4 | 172.4 | 197.4 | 120.1 | 89.7 | 67.5 | 46.4 | 1,231 |
| Percentage possible sunshine | 13 | 15 | 23 | 30 | 29 | 29 | 40 | 49 | 33 | 26 | 21 | 15 | 27 |
Source 1: China Meteorological Administration extremes
Source 2: Weather China

== Transportation ==
- Enshi Xujiaping International Airport
- Yiwan Railway
- China National Highway 209
- G50 Shanghai–Chongqing Expressway, which crosses the Qing River near the city over the Qingjiang Bridge.
