= Qing River =

River in Hubei, China

Coordinates: 30.49287°N 111.17005°E

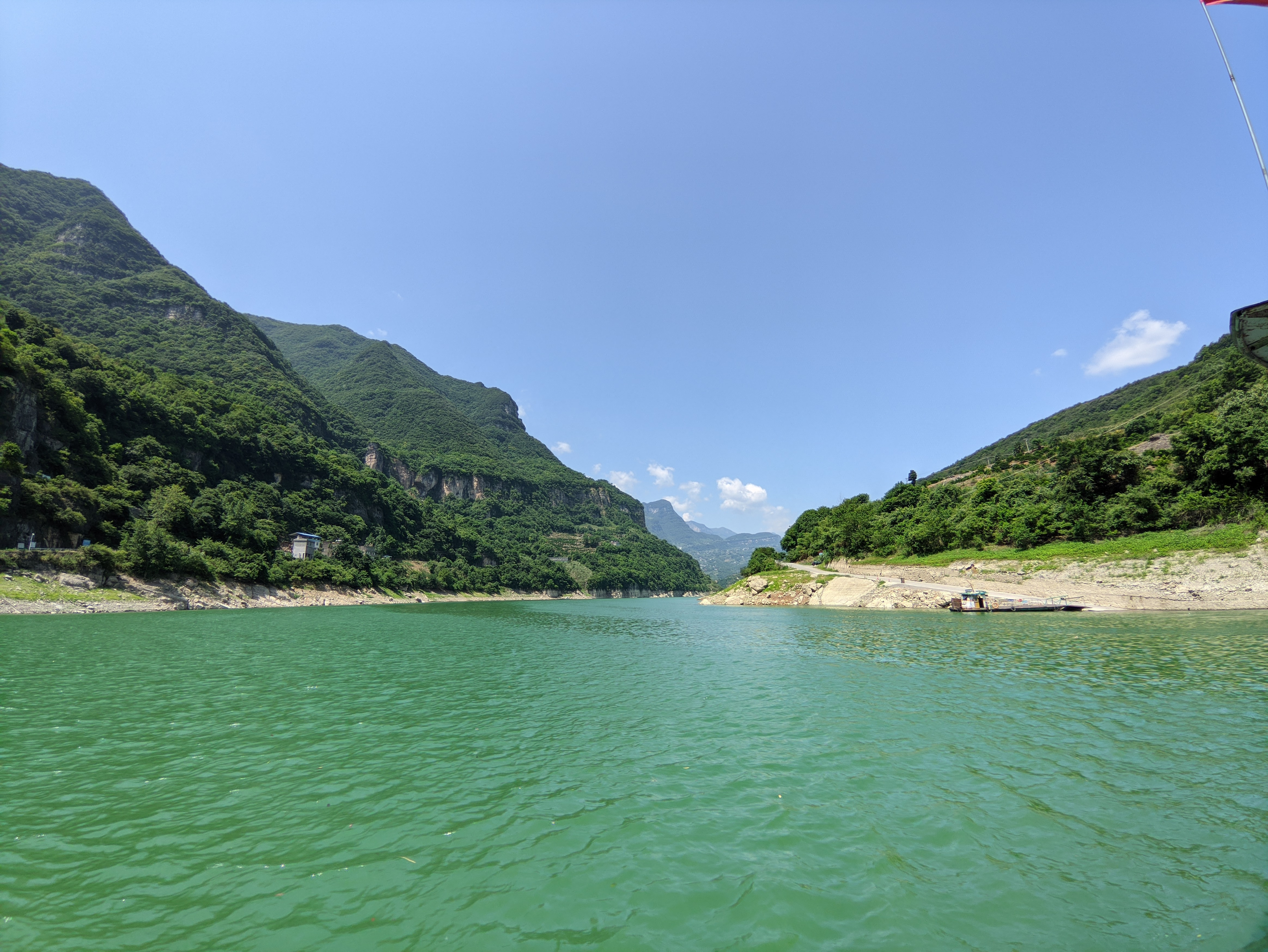
Qing River in Changyang, Hubei province.

The Qing River (Chinese: 清江; pinyin: Qīng Jiāng; lit. 'Pure River') is a right (southern) tributary of the Yangtze River (Chang Jiang) in Hubei province of south-central China.

== Geography ==
=== Course ===
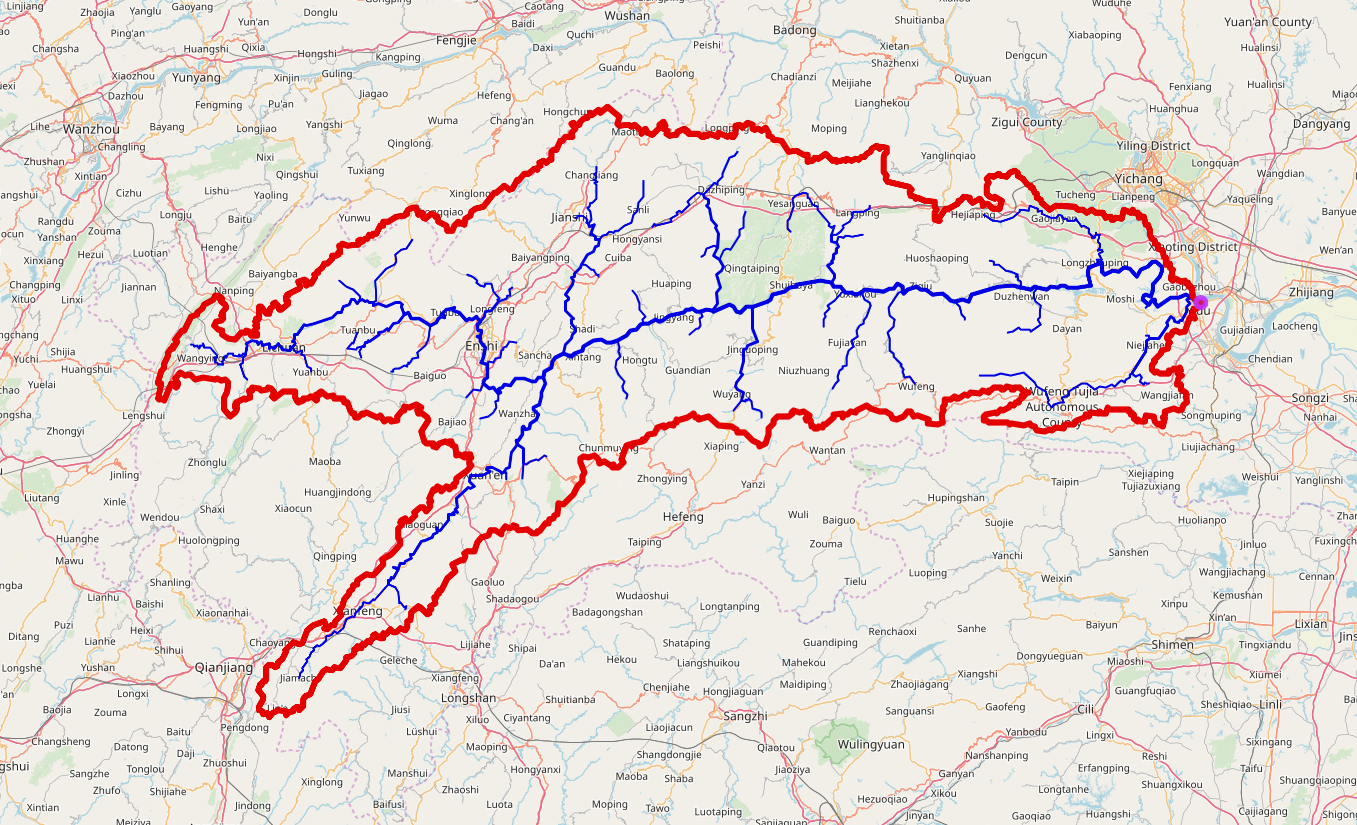
Qing river basin

The Qing River Headwaters originate at Tenglong Cave (Teng Long Dong) near Lichuan City, in Hubei's southwestern corner. The river is 423 kilometres (263 mi) long. Its drainage area is 17,000 square kilometres (4,200,000 acres), occupying large portions of the Enshi Tujia and Miao Autonomous Prefecture and Yichang Prefecture-level city. The Qing River (Qing Jiang) confluence with the Yangtze River (Chang Jiang) is at the ancient city of Yidu in the Yichang Prefecture of Hubei.

== Dams ==
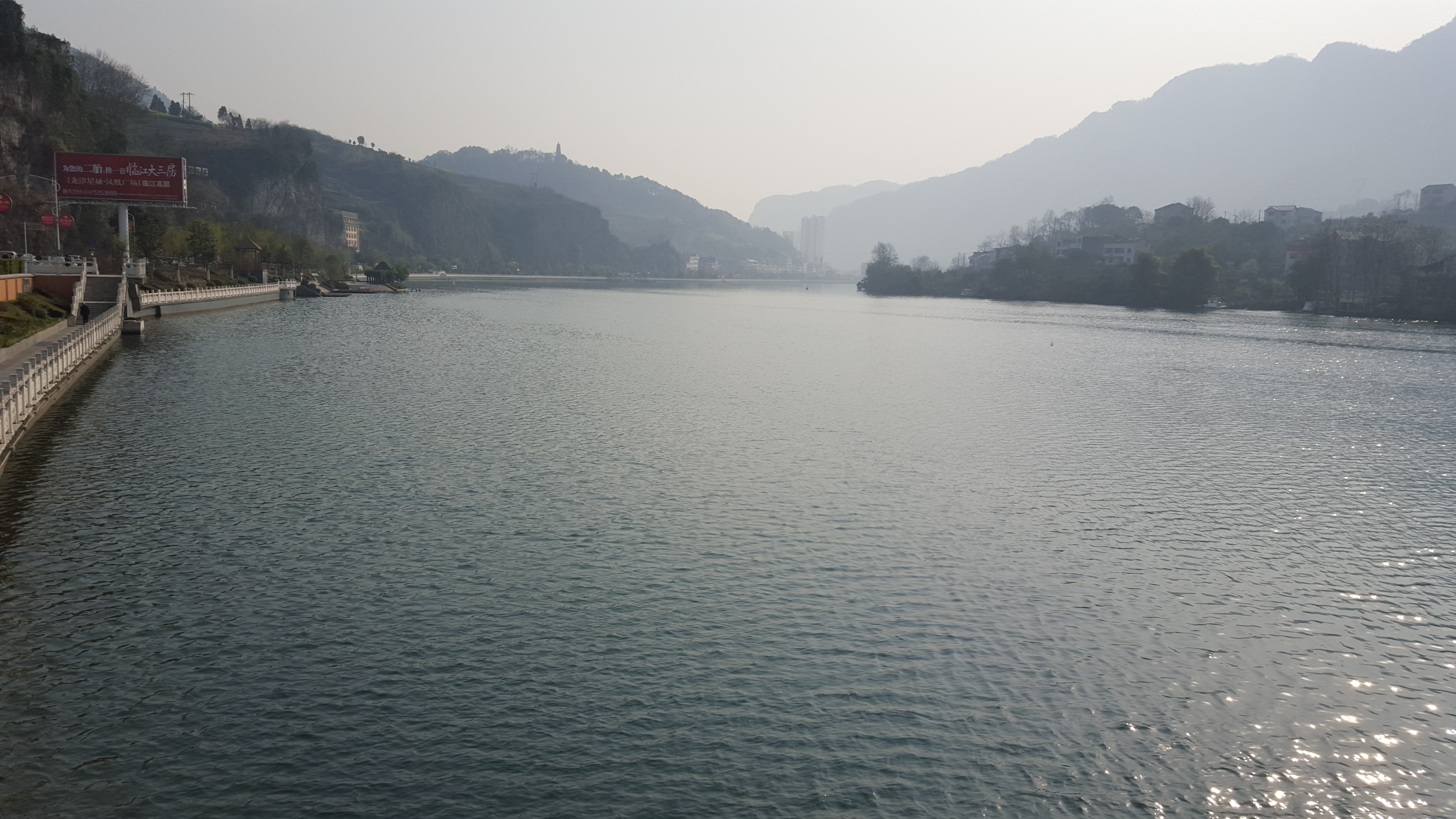
Qing River

The Qing River has three large dams on it: the Geheyan Dam, Gaobazhou Dam, and Shuibuya Dam.

The Geheyan Dam has a ship lift that can lift vessels of up to 300 tons displacement, to allow water transport upriver from the dam. During the 1998 Yangtze River floods the dam effectively held back the Qing River (Qing Jiang) flow.

There is also the Dongping Dam on the Zhongjiang River (忠建河), the main right tributary of the Qing River.

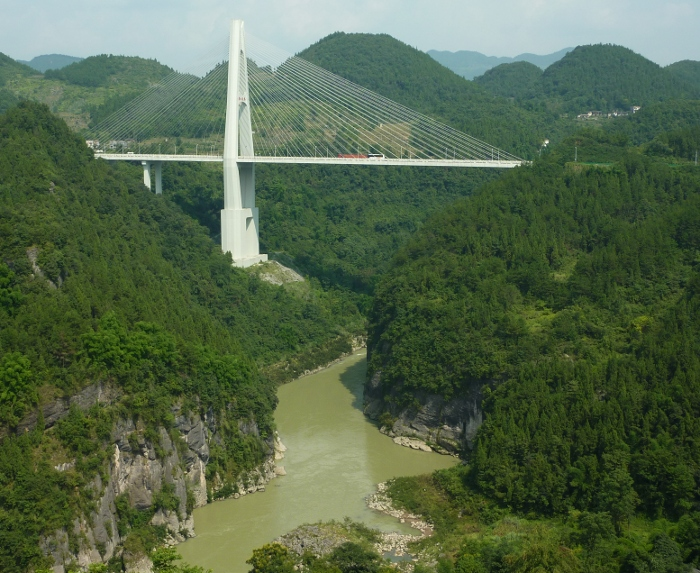
The G50 Shanghai–Chongqing Expressway crossing the Qing River (Qing Jiang) near Enshi City over the Qingjiang Bridge.

In May 2007 landslides into a reservoir on the Qiaohe River, a tributary of the Qing River, caused significant property damage.

== "Qing River Gallery" ==
The "Qing River Gallery" (清江画廊, Qīngjiāng Huàláng) is a Hubei Provincial Scenic Area that includes a series of scenic sites along the course of the Qing River upstream from the Geheyan Dam up to the Shuibuya Salt Springs.
