= Jianshi County =

Jianshi County 建始县 Kienshih, Chien-shih
- County
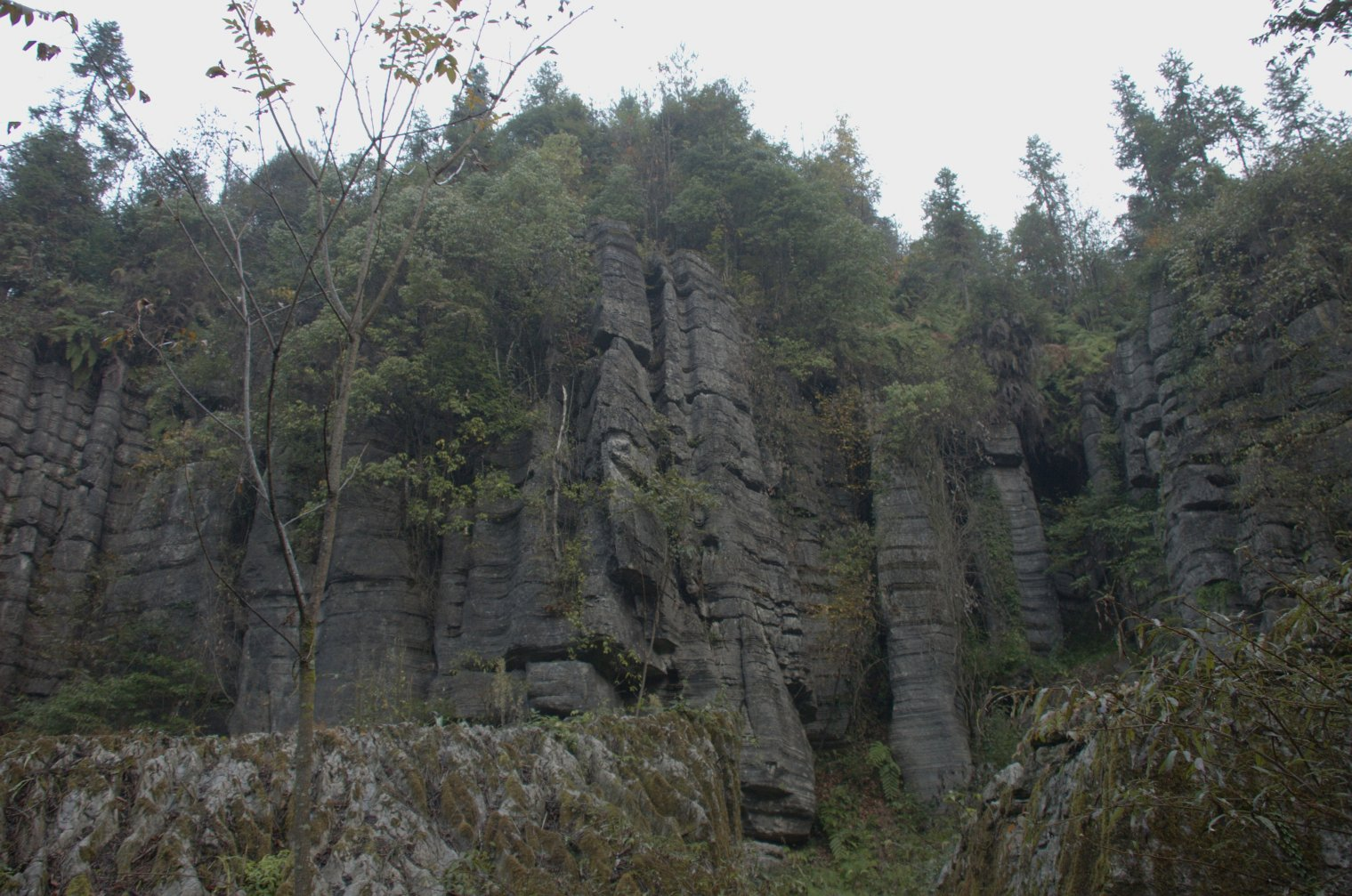
- Suobaya Stone Forest

- Location in Hubei
- Coordinates: 30°36′N 109°43′E
- Country: People's Republic of China
- Province: Hubei
- Autonomous prefecture: Enshi

Area
  - Total: 2,666.55 km^{2} (1,029.56 sq mi)

Population (2020)
  - Total: 411,622
  - Density: 154.365/km^{2} (399.804/sq mi)
- Time zone: UTC+8 (China Standard)
- Website: www.hbjs.gov.cn

Jianshi County (simplified Chinese: 建始县; traditional Chinese: 建始縣; pinyin: Jiànshǐ Xiàn) is a county of southwestern Hubei province, People's Republic of China. It is under the administration of the Enshi Tujia and Miao Autonomous Prefecture.

== Administrative divisions ==
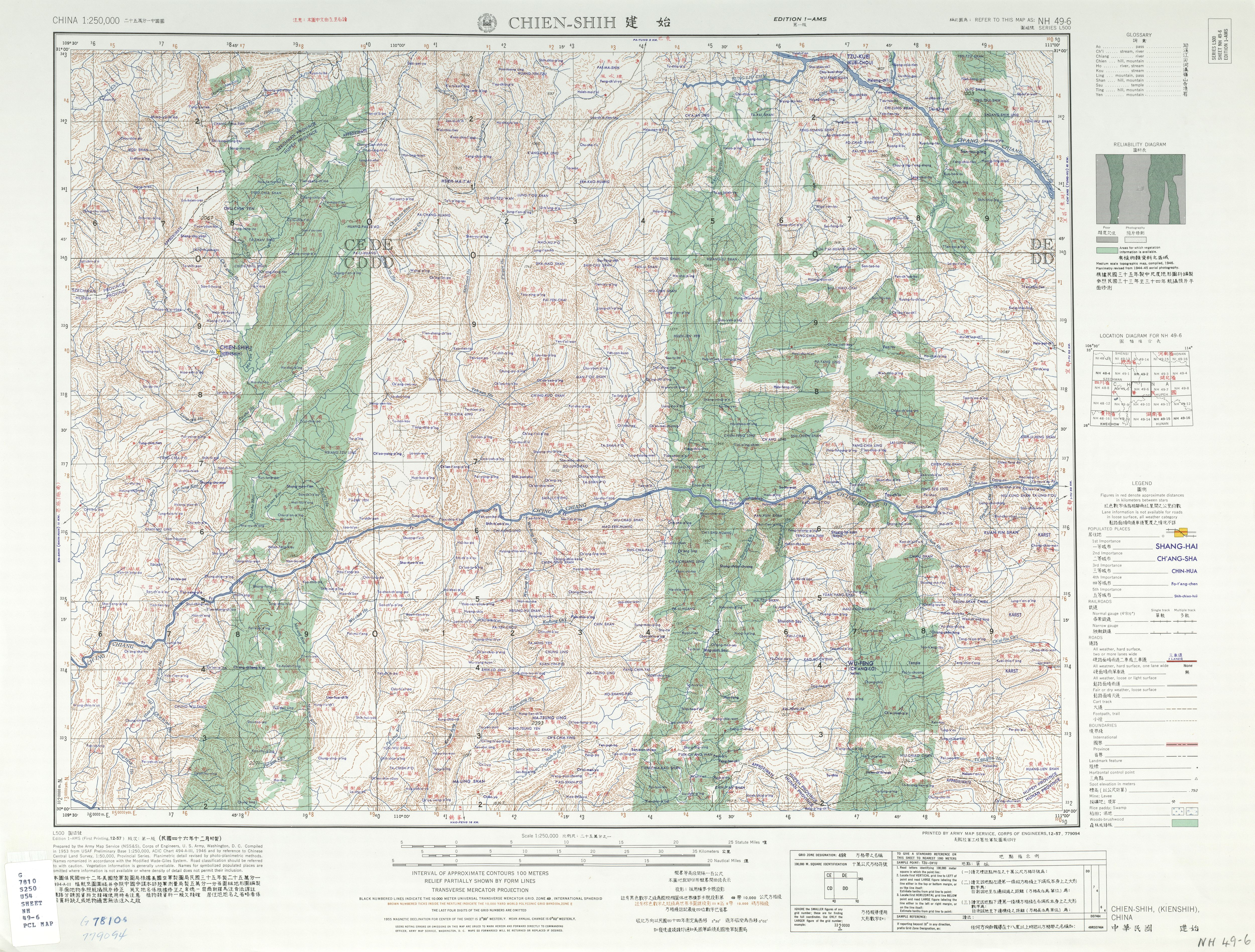
Map including Jianshi (labeled as 建始 CHIEN-SHIH (KIENSHIH)) (AMS, 1953)

Seven towns:

- Yezhou (业州镇)
- Gaoping (高坪镇)
- Hongyansi (红岩寺镇)
- Jingyang (景阳镇)
- Guandian (官店镇)
- Huaping (花坪镇, before 2011, Huaping Township 花坪乡)
- Changliang (长梁镇, formerly Changliang Township 长梁乡)

Three townships:

- Maotian Township (茅田乡)
- Longping Township (龙坪乡)
- Sanli Township (三里乡)

== Climate ==
Climate data for Jianshi, elevation 620 m (2,030 ft), (1991–2020 normals, extremes 1981–present)
Month	Jan	Feb	Mar	Apr	May	Jun	Jul	Aug	Sep	Oct	Nov	Dec	Year
Record high °C (°F)	20.8 (69.4)	24.2 (75.6)	32.6 (90.7)	35.8 (96.4)	35.0 (95.0)	37.8 (100.0)	38.0 (100.4)	38.3 (100.9)	38.3 (100.9)	32.8 (91.0)	26.2 (79.2)	19.1 (66.4)	38.3 (100.9)
Mean daily maximum °C (°F)	8.3 (46.9)	10.9 (51.6)	16.0 (60.8)	22.0 (71.6)	25.6 (78.1)	28.8 (83.8)	31.5 (88.7)	31.9 (89.4)	27.3 (81.1)	21.3 (70.3)	15.9 (60.6)	10.1 (50.2)	20.8 (69.4)
Daily mean °C (°F)	4.5 (40.1)	6.7 (44.1)	10.7 (51.3)	16.0 (60.8)	19.8 (67.6)	23.3 (73.9)	25.8 (78.4)	25.7 (78.3)	21.7 (71.1)	16.2 (61.2)	11.3 (52.3)	6.1 (43.0)	15.7 (60.2)
Mean daily minimum °C (°F)	2.1 (35.8)	3.8 (38.8)	7.1 (44.8)	11.9 (53.4)	15.9 (60.6)	19.5 (67.1)	22.1 (71.8)	21.7 (71.1)	18.1 (64.6)	13.2 (55.8)	8.4 (47.1)	3.6 (38.5)	12.3 (54.1)
Record low °C (°F)	−6.6 (20.1)	−4.1 (24.6)	−2.5 (27.5)	2.2 (36.0)	7.4 (45.3)	12.0 (53.6)	14.5 (58.1)	14.2 (57.6)	10.9 (51.6)	3.5 (38.3)	−0.2 (31.6)	−6.2 (20.8)	−6.6 (20.1)
Average precipitation mm (inches)	23.8 (0.94)	39.5 (1.56)	60.7 (2.39)	117.6 (4.63)	173.6 (6.83)	205.6 (8.09)	277.8 (10.94)	189.1 (7.44)	138.5 (5.45)	109.0 (4.29)	60.8 (2.39)	21.9 (0.86)	1,417.9 (55.81)
Average precipitation days (≥ 0.1 mm)	10.7	10.5	12.9	14.8	16.4	15.6	15.7	13.3	12.1	13.0	11.1	9.4	155.5
Average snowy days	4.1	2.0	0.8	0	0	0	0	0	0	0	0	1.0	7.9
Average relative humidity (%)	81	79	76	77	79	79	80	77	79	83	83	82	80
Mean monthly sunshine hours	50.1	54.7	91.0	117.2	127.1	129.0	168.8	196.4	124.6	91.5	73.9	54.9	1,279.2
Percentage possible sunshine	16	17	24	30	30	31	39	48	34	26	23	18	28
Source: China Meteorological Administration
