= Chunshe =

Chinese folk festival

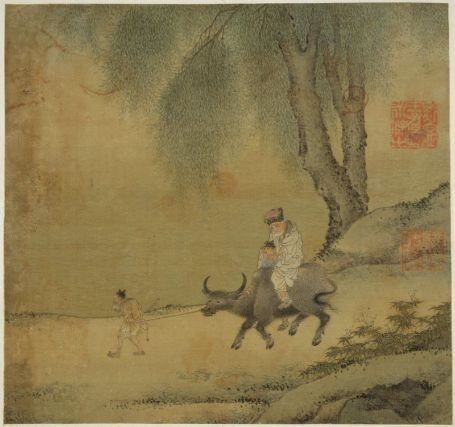
Returning from drinking by Li Tang, a painter of the Southern Song dynasty (1066－1150）

Chunshe (春社), or Spring Community Day, is a traditional folk festival originating from China. During the Shang dynasty and the Western Zhou, it was a carnival where lovers could date. Gradually, it became a sacrifice ritual to appease/in honour of Tudishen (God of the Soil and the Ground). People usually celebrate this festival on the fifth Wu Day (according to the sexagenary cycle) after Lichun, which is near Chunfen. (Note: There is a method of recording days in ancient China called "ganzhi", also known as the Sexagenary Cycle (or Stems-and-Branches). In the 60-day cycle, the first day is called Jiazi, the second day is the Yichou day, the third day is the Bingyin day, the fourth day is the Dingmao day, the eleventh day is the Jiayou day, the thirteenth day is the Bingzi day, etc.) According to folklore, the date could be February 2, February 8, February 12 or February 15 based on the lunar calendar.

The record of Chunshe can be traced as far back as on oracle bones. With a history of more than 2000 years, it is one of China's oldest festivals. Chunshe remained a significant traditional festival in China before the Yuan dynasty. Nowadays, though part of China (including mainland and Taiwan) still keeps the custom of worshiping Tudigong on February 2 (lunar calendar), (Note: The date various in different regions.) the new celebration, now called Tudidan (the birthday of Tudigong), is not exactly the same as the traditional one. The Longtaitou Festival (meaning dragon raising its head), which is celebrated by the northern region of China, also retains some customs of Chunshe. A scholar once summarized the whole trajectory of Chunshe as "originating in the period of the Xia, Shang and Zhou dynasties, springing up in the Qin and Han dynasties, continuing in Wei, Jin, and the Northern and Southern dynasties, flourishing in Tang and Song dynasties and declining in Yuan, Ming and Qing dynasties." Like many other traditional festivals relevant to sacrifice, Chunshe can be divided into two types according to different hosts, namely the official Chunshe and the folk Chunshe. Official celebrations were grand and solemn with complex ceremonials, while the folk ones were full of life. People would hold parties in their communities and attend various leisure activities at that day. The customs included beating drums, feasting, drinking and watching drama in the community. Such merry occasions were rare. The Chinese word shehui (社会, society) actually has its root in community activities during Chunshe.

Every year, the festival of Sheri (Community Day) is held twice (one in spring and one in autumn) as ancient Chinese believed that "the prayer in spring can be rewarded in autumn".^{:540} Shang Binghe, a famous analyzer of I Ching at the turn of the Republic of China, described Sheri as "the oldest and the most prevailing festival in Chinese history". One of its legacies is the temples housing the Tudishen, which are still common across China.

== History ==
=== Origins during the Xia, Shang and Zhou dynasties ===
In ancient China, "She", according to the Shuowen Jiezi, refers to the deity of the land. In ancient times, the main way of food acquisition in China changed from fishing, hunting and animal husbandry to agriculture. Therefore, people came to realize the importance of the land and began to worship it. The land was personalized and then the idea of "deity of the land" came into existence. The rulers, as well as the people at that period, began to offer sacrifices to the deity. The descriptions of the ceremony could be found in oracle bone scripts. Gradually, these customs of sacrifice developed into what people later called Chunshe. It is fair to say that Chunshe can be dated back to the time when the "deity of the land" was created, namely the late patriarchal clan society.

In general, the purposes of Chunshe include:

- pray for a good harvest
- pray for good weather
- pray for good luck
- entertain the deity and the people
- pray for a good marriage and for having children
- pray for victory

A considerable amount of scholars reckon that in addition to the deity of the land, people also offer sacrifice to the deity of five grains.

In the early Qin dynasty, celebrations of Chunshe could last for a relatively long time as all sacrifices made to the land in spring can be called Chunshe. At that time, the celebrations included two major types. One type was the sacrifices to the land and ancestors ^{:42} while the other one, Chunxi (spring carnival), was more entertaining as people can have orgies.

Before the Warring States period, "Shela" was the only related festival.^{:414} Once, after the recovery of a disease, King Zhaoxiang of Qin ordered to kill the cow and offer it as a sacrifice. However, he was dissuaded by Gongsun Yan as the time for Shela was yet to come.

==== Types of Chunshe ====
Chunshe can be divided into different types according to its hosts. There are Da’ she (the one hosted by the King for the nation) (Note: Dashe, also called Sheji, is the ceremony where sacrifices for the deities of the land and five grains are held. According to the Book of Rites, Dashe refers to the ceremony hosted by the King for the people.), Guoshe (hosted by feudatories for the people (Note: As is explained by Kong Yingda, Qunxing includes feudal officials and the people.)), Hou’ she (the feudatories’ own celebration (Note: Baixing can refer to either the entire feudal officials or the populace)) and Zhi'she (hosted by officials in groups). The sacrifices presided over by the rulers are often referred to as official Chunshe with all resources funded by the government. Since the early period of Qin, the official Chunshe did not see many changes in terms of ritual, process and function. However, in different dynasties where there are different political systems and various names for the administrative unit, the name of Chunshe also changed accordingly.

During the spring and autumn periods and the Warring States period, great changes took place in the social and political structure. The types of Chunshe were no longer determined by the rank of the host but by regions. Zhi'she gradually evolved into "Li'she" (the folk Chunshe). (Note: As is recorded in the Ten Wings (a collection of commentaries), Li is the unit of residential areas. Five houses equal one neighbourhood and five residential neighbourhoods is called one Li.) Li'she was usually observed by the local government official and the cost was shared by the people themselves. This form of activity greatly boosted public enthusiasm to participate in social affairs, strengthened the social function of the folk Chunshe, and finally settled it as a festival.

The official sacrifice has to follow a full set of etiquette including burying the sacrificial offering, dropping blood on the ground (Note: 瘞(Yi) means burying.) and using a human sacrifice.

During the spring and autumn period, there were mainly two ways of offering sacrifices during Li'she. One was to offer to gods the quarry hunted together by 25 families. The second was to offer sacrifices together. After the sacrifice, all participants gathered together, eating and drinking to their heart's content. This was a festival that the whole community would participate in. It was a time for a party and feast. There is a lively description of the scene of Chunshe in Lao Tzu: "the street is dense with the merry crowd". Shang Binghe called it "an orgy in the name of sacrifice". The lively scene even attracted Duke Zhuang of Lu to the state of Qi to watch its sacrificial rites.

In the early Qin period, people attached great importance to social sacrifice. Zi Lu, a disciple of Confucius, was nearly sent to prison by the locals just because he tried to catch the bird in the tree for sacrifice. Luckily, the local people accepted their apology and forgave him.
