= Xuan'en County =

Xuan'en County 宣恩县 Suanen
- County
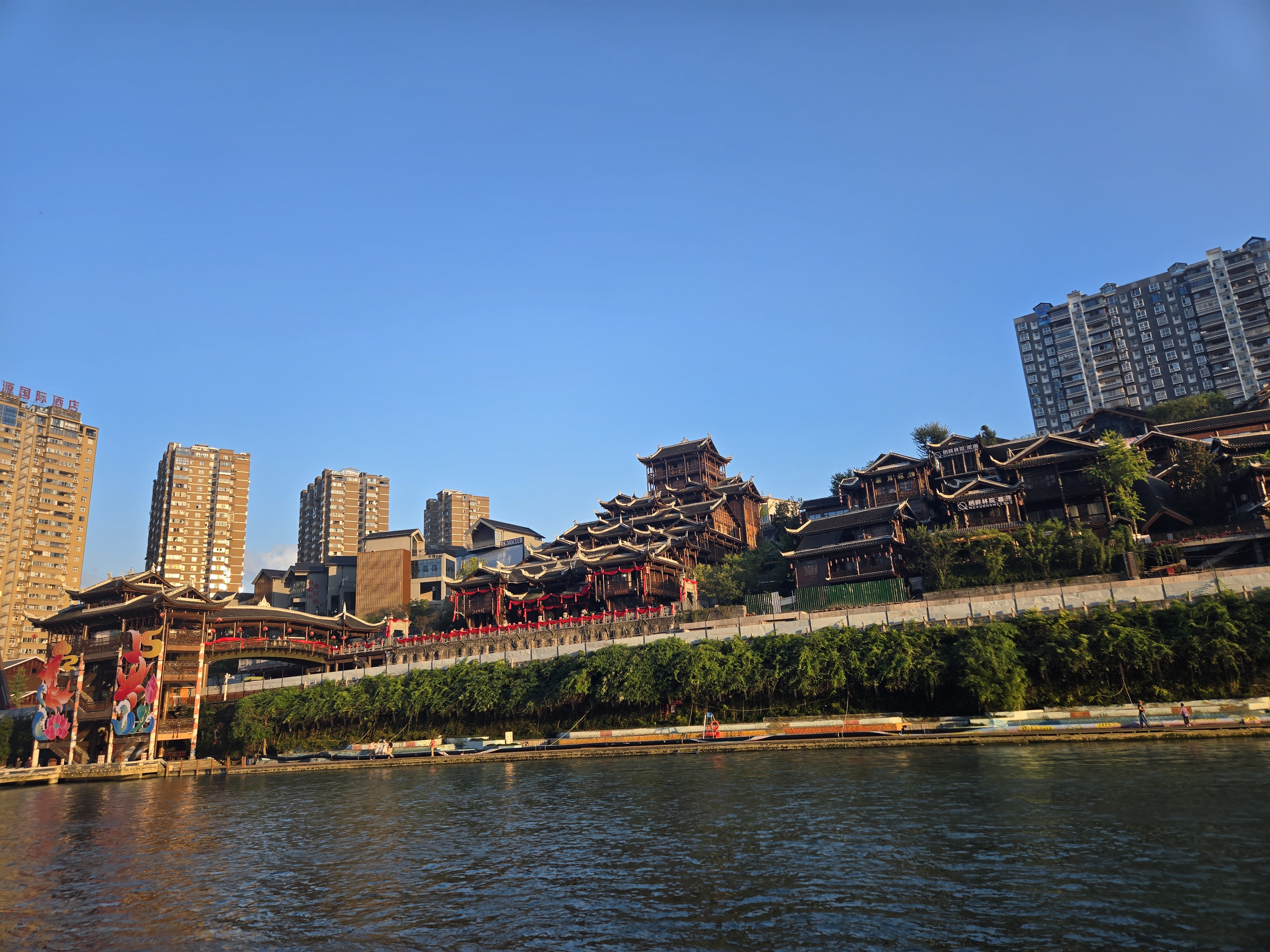

- Location in Hubei
- Coordinates: 29°59′13″N 109°29′28″E
- Country: People's Republic of China
- Province: Hubei
- Prefecture: Enshi

Area
  - Total: 2,758.2 km^{2} (1,064.9 sq mi)

Population (2020)
  - Total: 284,955
  - Density: 103.31/km^{2} (267.58/sq mi)
- Time zone: UTC+8 (China Standard)
- Website: xe.gov.cn

Xuan'en County (Chinese: 宣恩县; pinyin: Xuān'ēn Xiàn) is a county of southwestern Hubei province, People's Republic of China, bordering Hunan province to the south. It is under the administration of the Enshi Tujia and Miao Autonomous Prefecture.

A remarkable topographic feature found in Xuan'en County is a 290-meter deep karst sinkhole, located near the village of Luoquanyan (锣圈岩村). According to news reports, the sinkhole, which occupies around 100 mu (6 hectares), has its own unique ecosystem.

== Administrative Divisions ==
Five towns:

- Zhushan (珠山镇), Jiaoyuan (椒园镇), Shadaogou (沙道沟镇), Lijiahe (李家河镇, before 2013 was Lijiahe Township 李家河乡) Gaoluo (高罗镇, former Gaoluo Township 高罗乡)

Four townships:

- Wanzhai Township (万寨乡), Changtanhe Dong Ethnic Township (长潭河侗族乡), Xiaoguan Dong Ethnic Township (晓关侗族乡), Chunmuying Township (椿木营乡)

== Climate ==
Climate data for Xuan'en, elevation 572 m (1,877 ft), (1991–2020 normals, extremes 1981–2010)
| Month | Jan | Feb | Mar | Apr | May | Jun | Jul | Aug | Sep | Oct | Nov | Dec | Year |
|---|---|---|---|---|---|---|---|---|---|---|---|---|---|
| Record high °C (°F) | 20.4 (68.7) | 25.4 (77.7) | 32.0 (89.6) | 35.5 (95.9) | 35.4 (95.7) | 37.5 (99.5) | 39.3 (102.7) | 39.5 (103.1) | 37.3 (99.1) | 32.6 (90.7) | 25.9 (78.6) | 19.9 (67.8) | 39.5 (103.1) |
| Mean daily maximum °C (°F) | 8.5 (47.3) | 11.1 (52.0) | 16.1 (61.0) | 22.2 (72.0) | 25.9 (78.6) | 29.0 (84.2) | 31.8 (89.2) | 32.1 (89.8) | 27.4 (81.3) | 21.4 (70.5) | 16.2 (61.2) | 10.4 (50.7) | 21.0 (69.8) |
| Daily mean °C (°F) | 4.8 (40.6) | 6.9 (44.4) | 10.8 (51.4) | 16.1 (61.0) | 20.1 (68.2) | 23.5 (74.3) | 26.0 (78.8) | 25.8 (78.4) | 21.8 (71.2) | 16.5 (61.7) | 11.6 (52.9) | 6.5 (43.7) | 15.9 (60.6) |
| Mean daily minimum °C (°F) | 2.6 (36.7) | 4.3 (39.7) | 7.4 (45.3) | 12.3 (54.1) | 16.5 (61.7) | 20.0 (68.0) | 22.5 (72.5) | 22.0 (71.6) | 18.5 (65.3) | 13.9 (57.0) | 9.1 (48.4) | 4.3 (39.7) | 12.8 (55.0) |
| Record low °C (°F) | −4.1 (24.6) | −4.0 (24.8) | −2.0 (28.4) | 3.2 (37.8) | 9.1 (48.4) | 13.9 (57.0) | 15.4 (59.7) | 16.1 (61.0) | 12.2 (54.0) | 5.2 (41.4) | −0.5 (31.1) | −3.6 (25.5) | −4.1 (24.6) |
| Average precipitation mm (inches) | 35.4 (1.39) | 46.5 (1.83) | 71.5 (2.81) | 131.0 (5.16) | 184.5 (7.26) | 205.1 (8.07) | 205.1 (8.07) | 159.1 (6.26) | 138.1 (5.44) | 119.9 (4.72) | 75.7 (2.98) | 30.4 (1.20) | 1,402.3 (55.19) |
| Average precipitation days (≥ 0.1 mm) | 13.0 | 13.3 | 14.4 | 15.6 | 17.6 | 16.4 | 15.4 | 13.3 | 12.7 | 14.5 | 12.4 | 11.8 | 170.4 |
| Average snowy days | 4.0 | 2.0 | 0.5 | 0 | 0 | 0 | 0 | 0 | 0 | 0 | 0.1 | 1.1 | 7.7 |
| Average relative humidity (%) | 84 | 82 | 80 | 80 | 81 | 82 | 81 | 79 | 82 | 85 | 86 | 85 | 82 |
| Mean monthly sunshine hours | 35.9 | 39.4 | 73.8 | 97.1 | 108.5 | 107.9 | 154.2 | 177.1 | 110.9 | 77.0 | 60.5 | 41.0 | 1,083.3 |
| Percentage possible sunshine | 11 | 12 | 20 | 25 | 26 | 26 | 36 | 44 | 30 | 22 | 19 | 13 | 24 |
Source: China Meteorological Administration
