= China National Highway 209 =

Road in China

National Highway 209
- 209国道

Route information
- Length: 3,435 km (2,134 mi)

Major junctions
- From: Sonid Left Banner, Inner Mongolia
- To: Beihai, Guangxi

Location
- Country: China

Highway system
- National Trunk Highway System; Primary; Auxiliary
← G208	→ G210

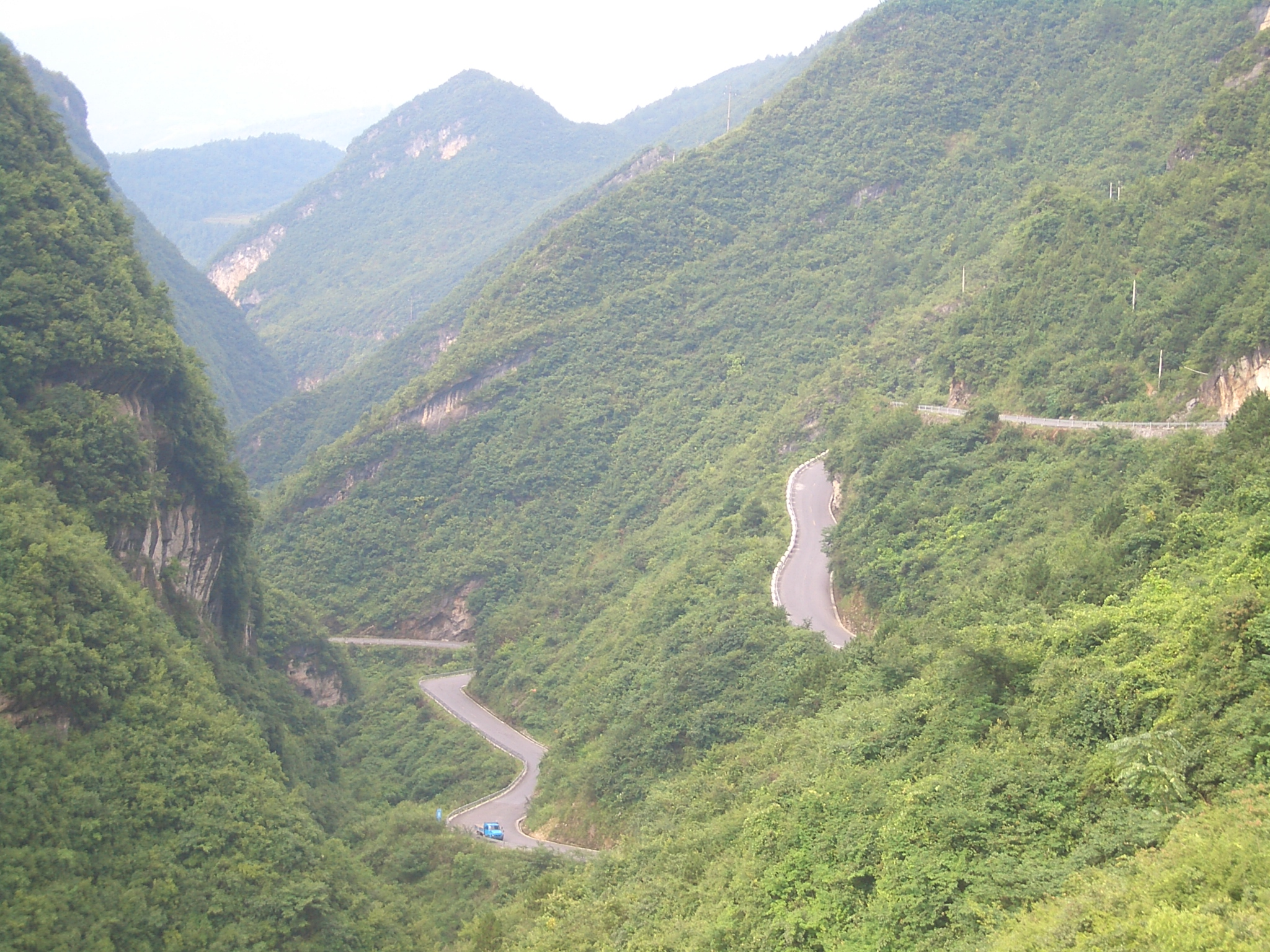
Highway 209 climbing from the Liangtai River valley (Gaoqiao town) toward Wanchaoshan Mt (Wujiaping), in Xingshan County, Hubei

China National Highway 209 (G209) runs from Sonid Left Banner, Inner Mongolia to Beihai, Guangxi province. It is 3,435 kilometres in length and runs south from Huhhot towards Shanxi province, Henan province, Hubei province, Hunan province, and ends in Guangxi province.

Despite the "National Highway" designation, G209 is not of uniform quality throughout its length. For example, as of 2009, the 20-kilometer section north of Badong is nothing but a very poor dirt road. Nonetheless, even that section is of importance for the national highway system: it is used e.g. by long-distance buses plying the route between Badong and points east. Many parts of the Muyu to Hongping section (in Hubei's Shennongjia Forestry District) are not much better. On the other hand, the section from the Shennongjia National Park entry to Muyu to Baishahe Village (in Nanyang Town, Xingshan County) is part of a recently upgraded Yichang-Shennongjia Highway.

== Route and distance ==
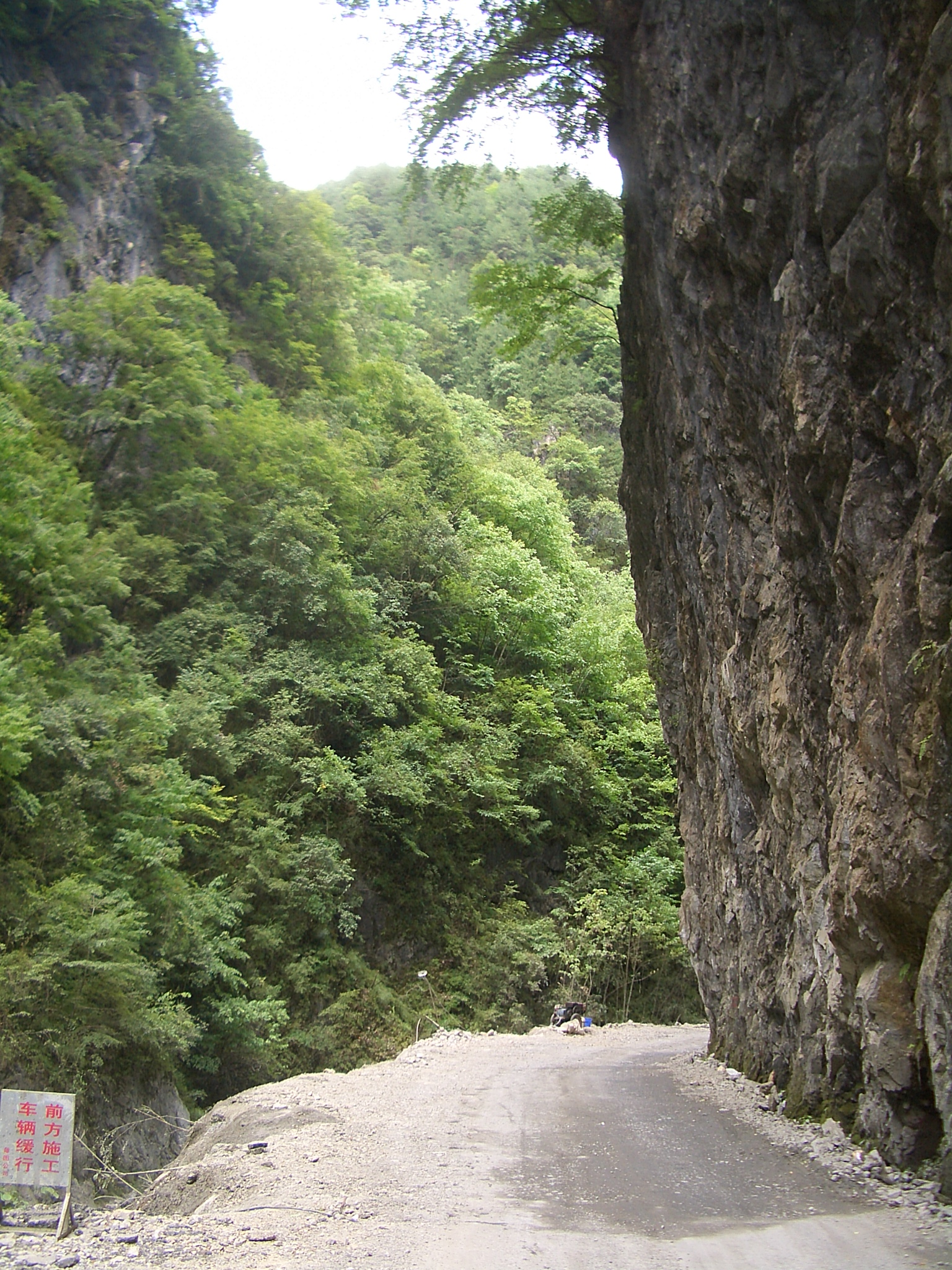
Near Wenshui village (Hongping Town, Shennongjia)

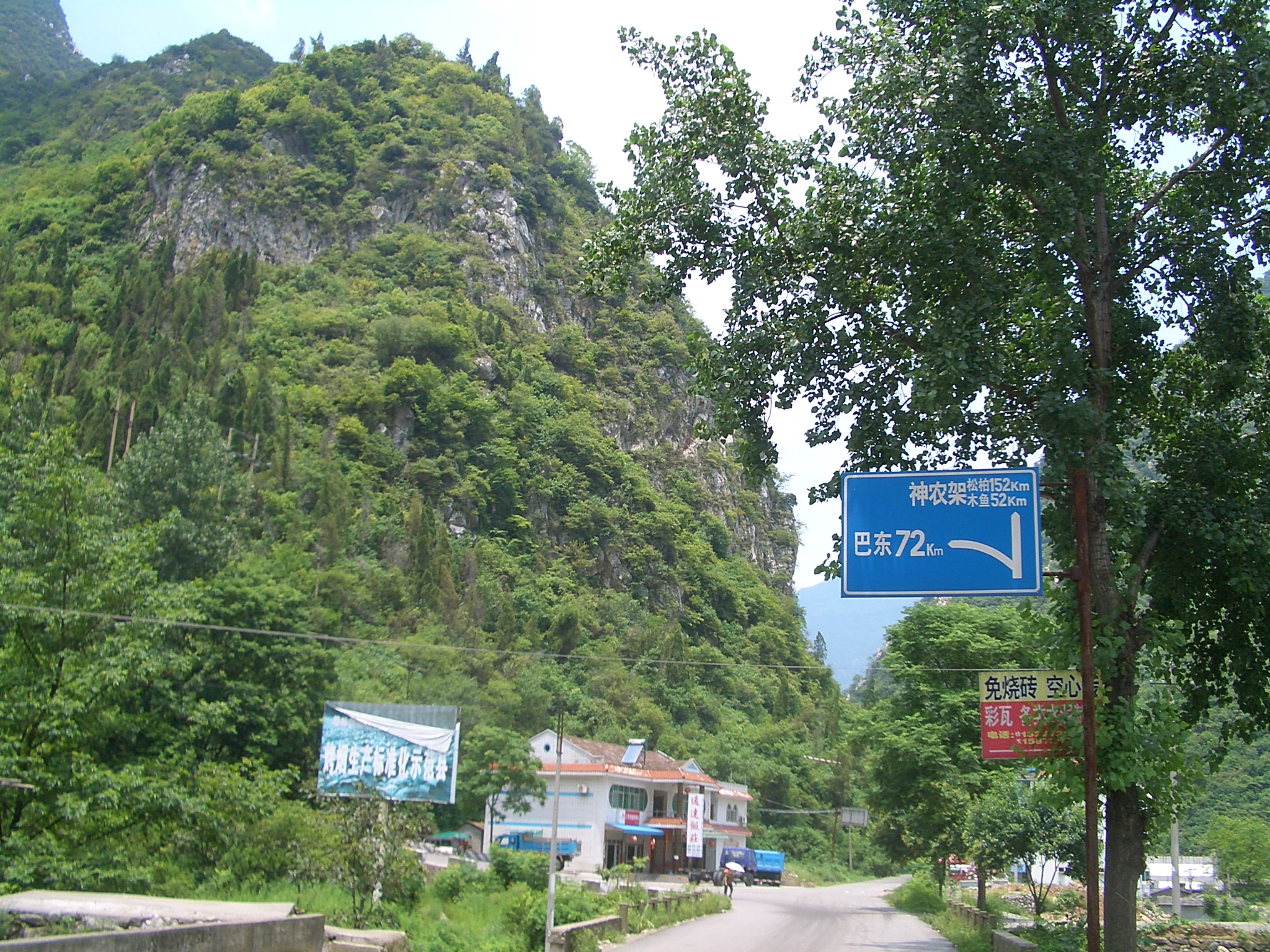
Junction with a Hubei provincial highway in Baishahe Village, Nanyang Town, Xingshan County, Hubei. For the next 52 km to the north (to Muyu) G209 will follow the Xiangping River, doubling as part of the Yichang-Shennongjia Highway; for the 72 km to the southwest, it will be crossing two mountain ranges to get to Badong

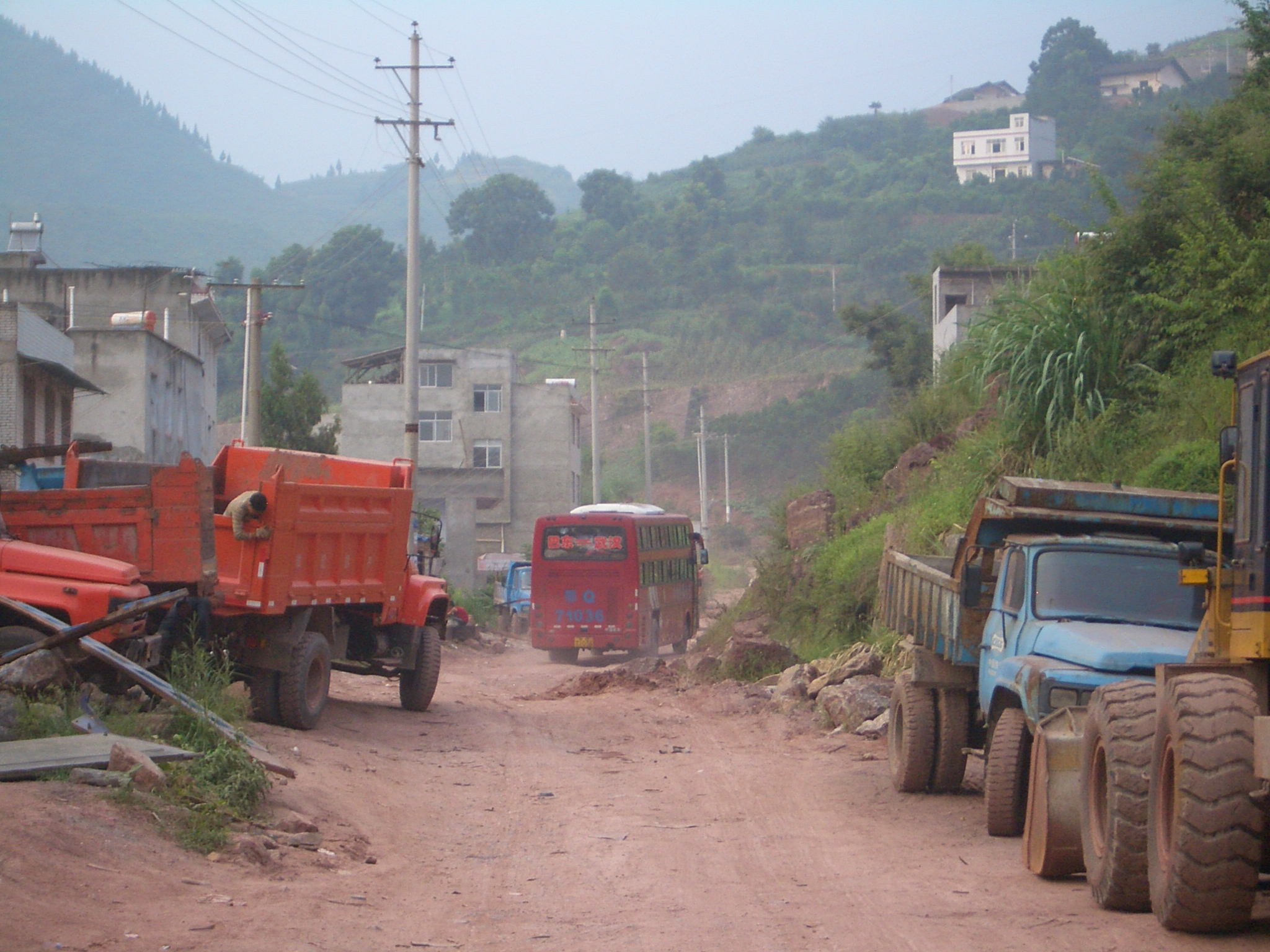
A not-yet-improved section of G209 just north of Badong

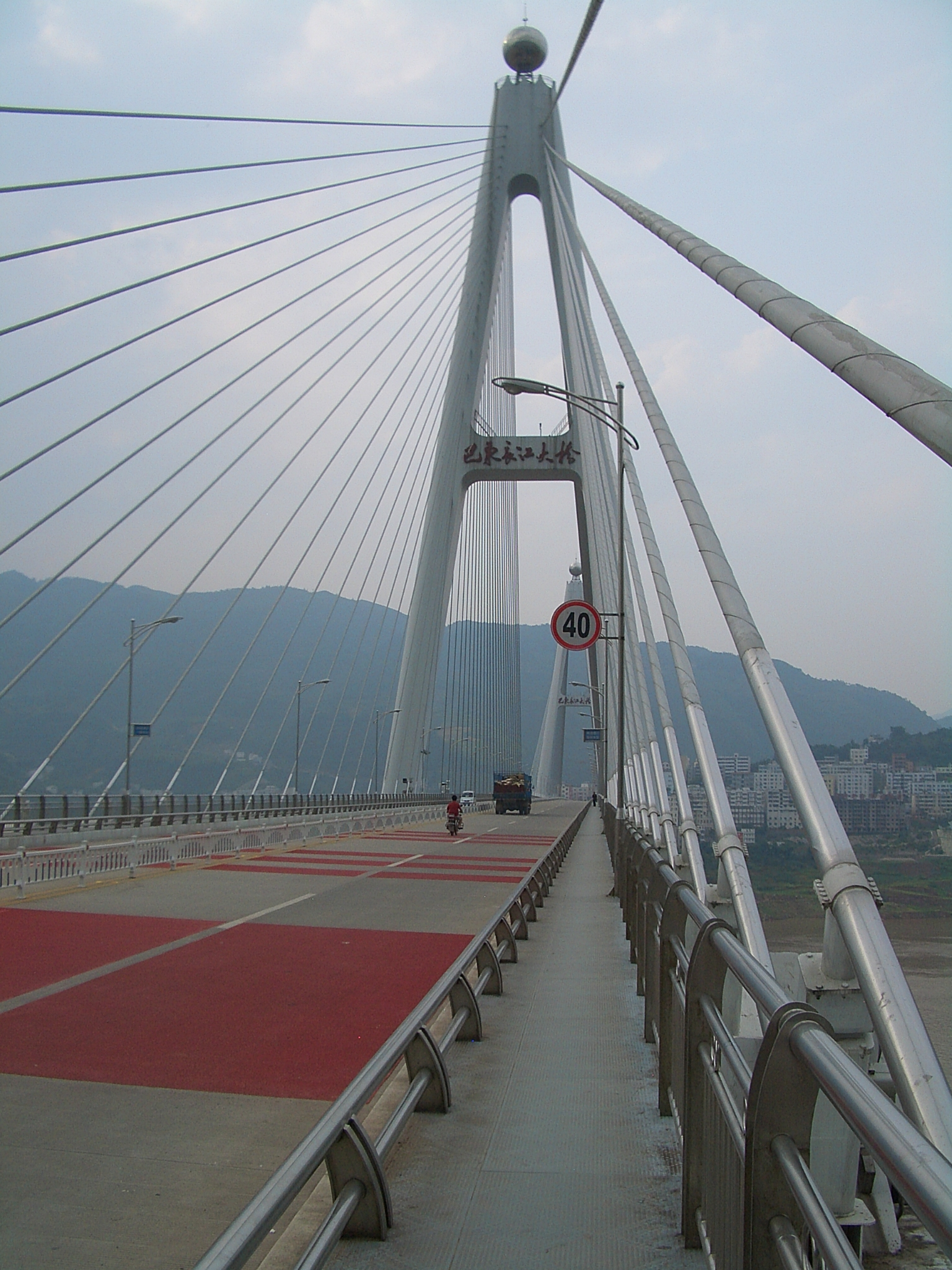
Crossing the Yangtze on the Badong Bridge

Route and distance

City	Distance (km)
Huhhot, Inner Mongolia	0
Horinger, Inner Mongolia	57
Qingshuihe, Inner Mongolia	136
Pianguan, Shanxi	231
Wuzhai, Shanxi	312
Kelan, Shanxi	351
Lanxian, Shanxi	419
Fangshan, Shanxi	485
Lishi, Shanxi	531
Zhongyang, Shanxi	558
Jiaokou, Shanxi	605
Xixian, Shanxi	652
Daning, Shanxi	692
Jixian, Shanxi	744
Xiangning, Shanxi	774
Hejin, Shanxi	836
Linyi County, Shanxi	891
Yuncheng, Shanxi	911
Pinglu, Shanxi	960
Sanmenxia, Henan	968
Lingbao, Henan	1028
Lushi, Henan	1109
Xixia, Henan	1230
Xixian, Henan	1304
Yunxian, Hubei	1366
Shiyan, Hubei	1398
Fangxian, Hubei	1501
Muyu, Hubei	
Nanyang Town, Hubei	
Badong, Hubei	1775
Jianshi, Hubei	1923
Enshi, Hubei	1978
Xuan'en, Hubei	2068
Laifeng, Hubei	2158
Longshan, Hunan	2167
Yongshun, Hunan	2224
Baojing, Hunan	2281
Huayuan, Hunan	2307
Jishou, Hunan	2377
Fenghuang, Hunan	2431
Mayang, Hunan	2466
Huaihua, Hunan	2525
Zhongfang, Hunan	2544
Hongjiang, Hunan	2575
Huitong, Hunan	2627
Jingzhou, Hunan	2667
Tongdao, Hunan	2748
Sanjiang, Guangxi	2826
Rong'an, Guangxi	2909
Liuzhou, Guangxi	3028
Wuxuan, Guangxi	3123
Lingshan, Guangxi	3286
Hepu, Guangxi	3407
Beihai, Guangxi	3435

== Image gallery ==
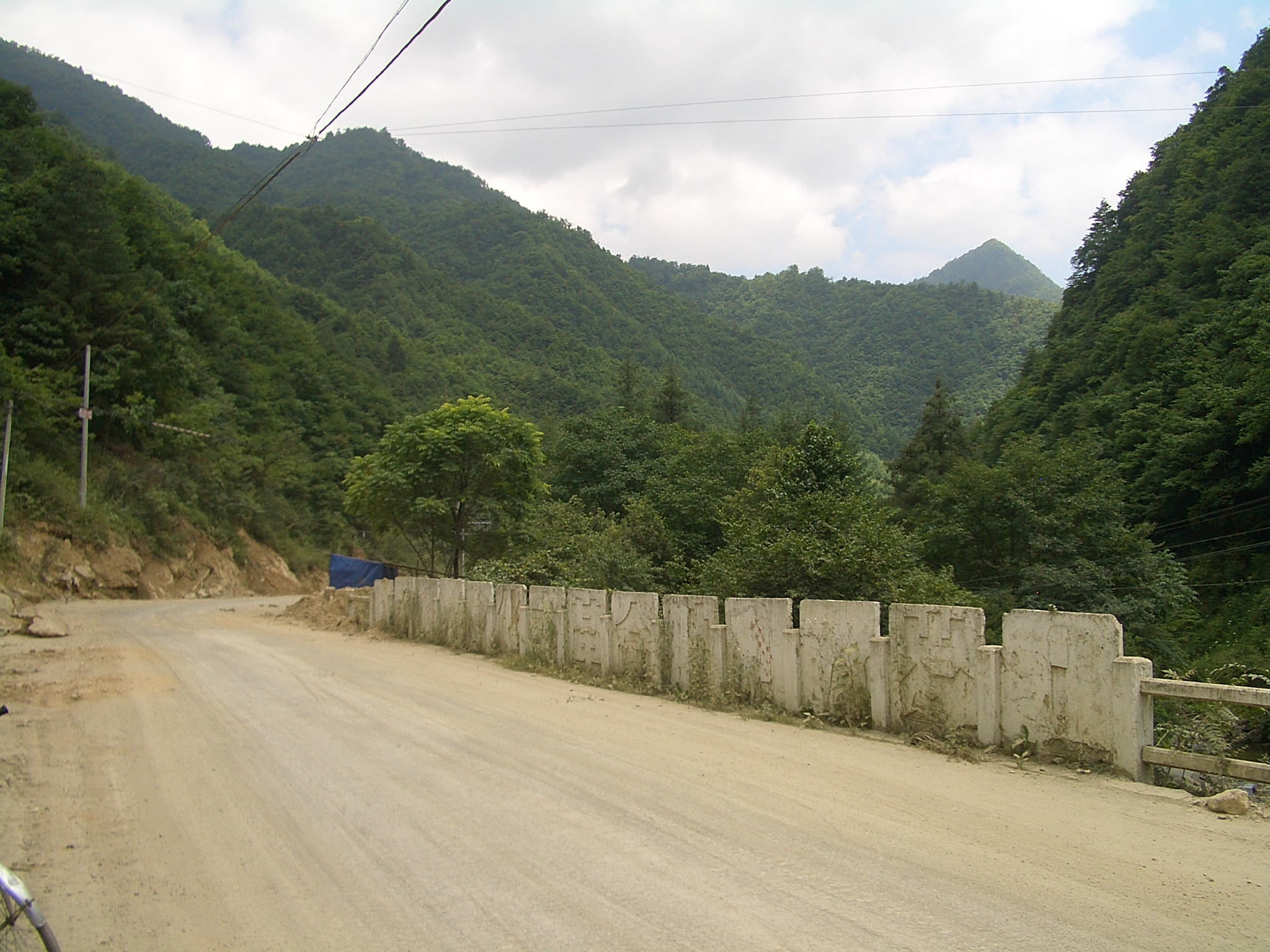
Victory Bridge (built 1970, on the Yema He River, south of Hongping Town, Shennongjia) glorifies the victory of the Cultural Revolution

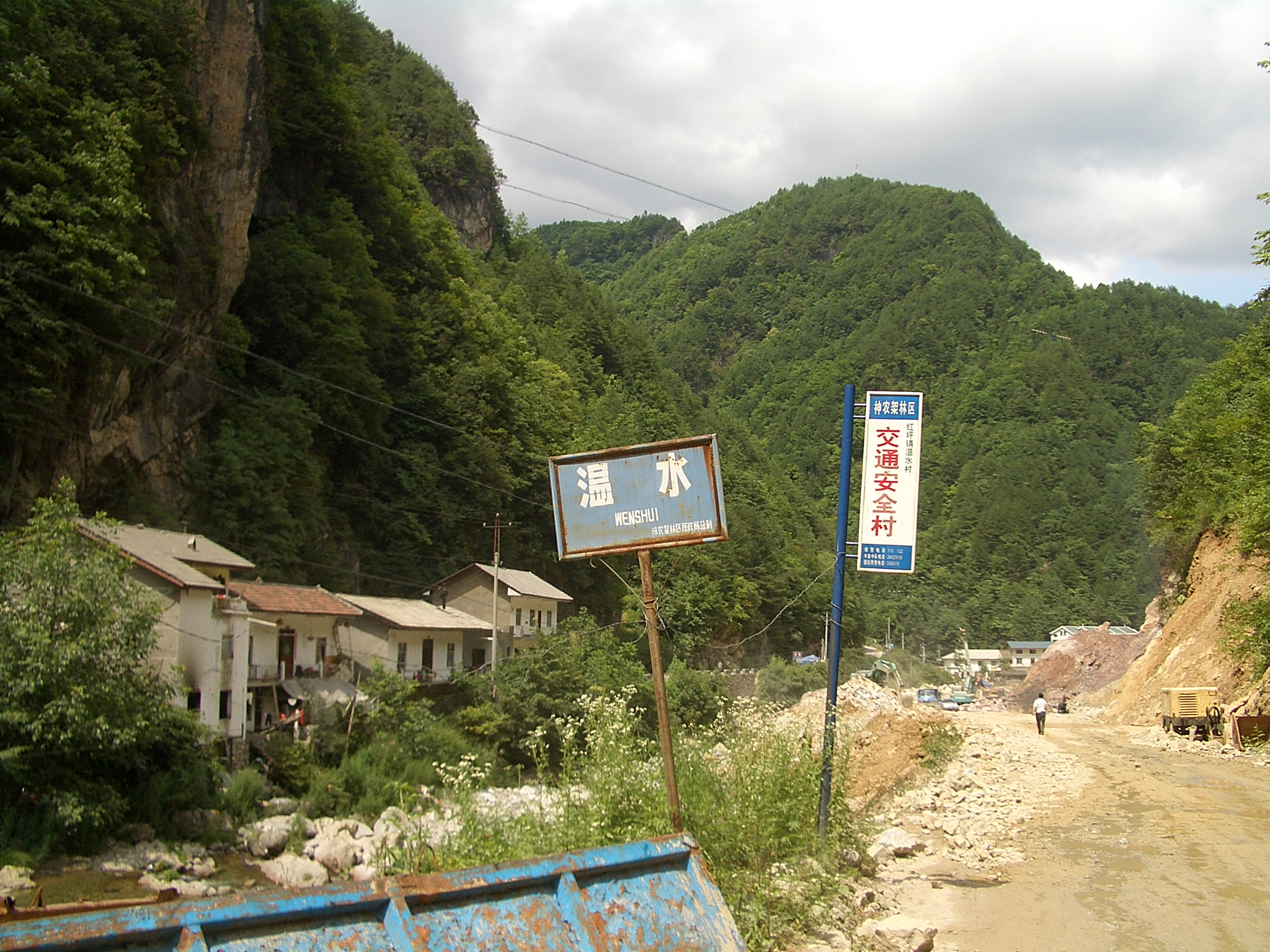
Improvements in progress ... (Wenshui Village)

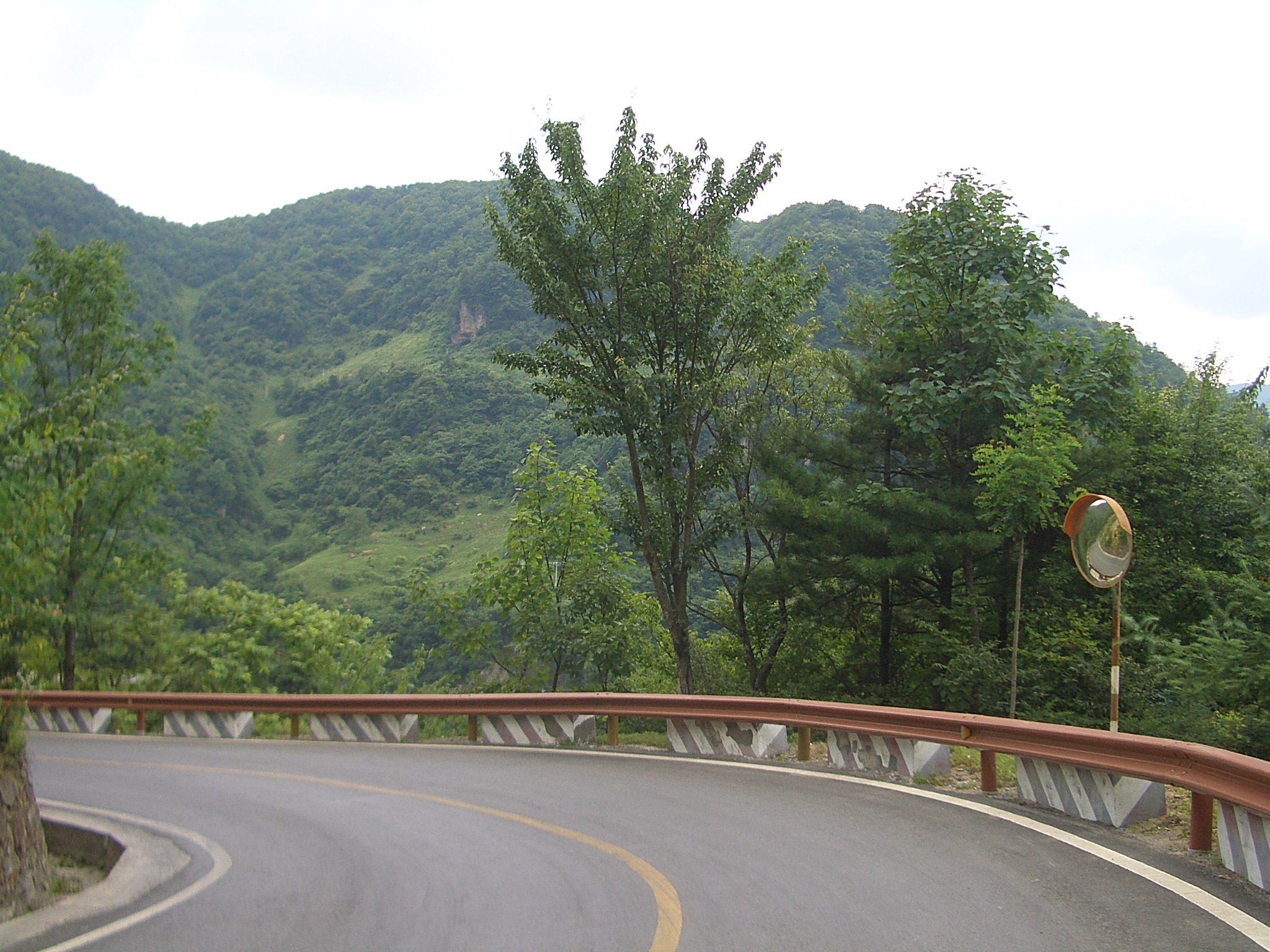
Hairpin turns are equipped with mirrors on the well-maintained section south of Yazikou Junction (main access to Shennongjia National Nature Reserve)

== See also ==
- China National Highways
