= Epic of Darkness =

The Epic of Darkness (traditional Chinese: 黑暗傳; simplified Chinese: 黑暗传; pinyin: Hēi Àn Zhuàn) is a collection of tales and legends of primeval China in epic poetry, preserved by the inhabitants of the Shennongjia mountain area in Hubei. It is composed of numerous Chinese myths relating to the creation of the world, containing accounts from the birth of Pangu till the historical era. It dates back to the Tang dynasty of China. It was translated and published by Hu Chongjun after the discovery of a manuscript in 1982.

Like the Homeric epics, the written poem was likely preceded by an oral tradition dating back to at least the Tang dynasty. Wooden copies of Darkness are said to have survived to the Ming dynasty but none have been found today.

== History ==
The origin of Darkness dates back to the Tang dynasty (618–907). At least eight manuscripts have survived today, most of which come from Shennongjia in China's Hubei Province. The tales told in the story have survived in the folk songs of the region.

In August 1982, Hu Chongjun was given a songbook by an old local farmer. The booklet was written in brush and ink with about 3,000 lines of seven Chinese characters each. It was split into four sections: the beginnings of the Universe; the Birth of Pangu; the Great Flood; and the birth of mankind until the beginnings of the Three Sovereigns and Five Emperors. Hu began to study and gather the manuscripts from accounts of old people living in Shennongjia.

Liu Shouhua, a professor at the Chinese Culture Department at the East China Normal University, read the ballad and believed that the Epic of Darkness may represent the Han Chinese creation myth that has been handed down in oral form.

Yuan Ke, a scholar in Chinese mythology, carefully studied the original materials and supported Liu's suggestion that the Epic of Darkness is a folk epic. Yuan said that the discovery of "Darkness" could be regarded a historic event in the folklore history of the Han people. Yuan suggested some people should further study the different versions and rearrange with caution, the manuscripts into an integrated epic, without ruining its original flavor.

Hu was chosen to compile this massive epic.

It took him nine years to finally finish the collection. With 5,500 lines, the new edition was selected as the best of many different versions, compiled after Hu skimmed through more than 30,000 lines of the original manuscripts. Liu, who has read most of the original material, said, "So far, the content of this edition is the richest one. Compared with other versions, this edition is more beautiful and is in the linguistic style."

In the same year, the Beijing-based Hualian Publishing House bought the copyrights to publish the Epic of Darkness. But due to financial problems, publication of the book was delayed year after year.

In 2000, Zhou Baiyi, publisher of the Changjiang Arts Publishing House, persuaded Hu to end his former contract with Hualian Publishing House and gave rights to his publishing house.

== Plot summary ==
In the beginning, everything was a cloud of gas, chaos and darkness. After eons of effort, the first drop of water was created by a deity named Jiang Ku (江沽). However a god named Lang Dang Zi (浪荡子) swallowed that drop of water and died. His body was split in five forms: Metal, Wood, Water, Fire and Earth. From the elements was born Pan Gu who split the heavens and the earth before he eventually died and his body became the Earth. However mankind had yet to be created at this time. From the five elements and animals, were born demons and gods who fought each other until a great flood overcame the land. From this great flood, two dragons one black and one yellow fought a great battle. A goddess, Sacred Mother Hao Tian, helped the yellow dragon defeat the black dragon. In gratitude, the yellow dragon laid three eggs which the Sacred Mother swallowed and gave birth to three gods, Heaven, Earth and Hell. Later from the flood came five dragons who found a gourd in the Eastern sea. Hao Tian opened the Gourd and found two humans, Fuxi and Nüwa, and told them to copulate and thus humans were born after the flood waters had receded.

== See also ==
- Music of Hubei
