= Shennongjia =

Shennongjia 神农架林区
- Forestry district
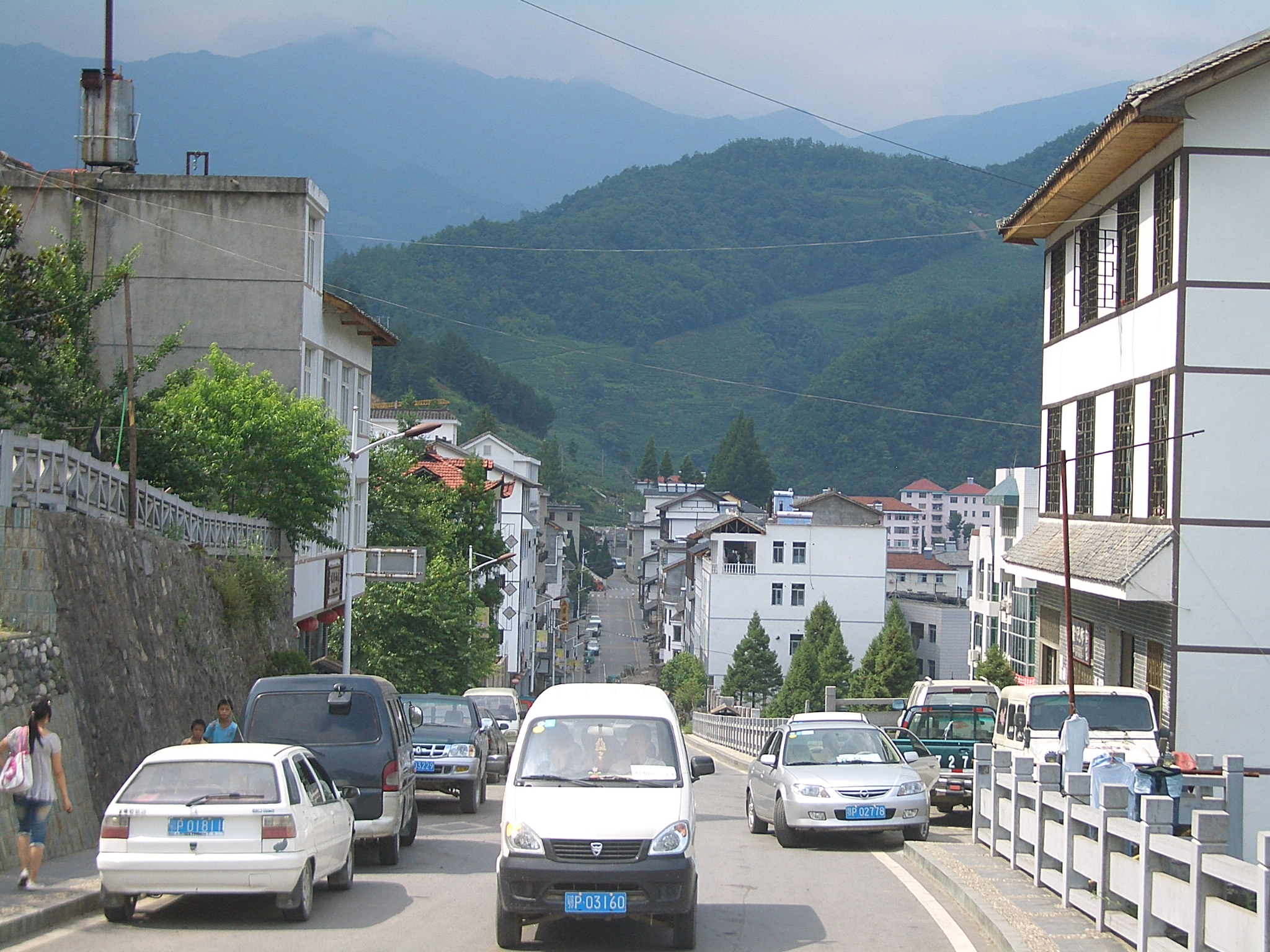
- Muyu Town in Shennongjia

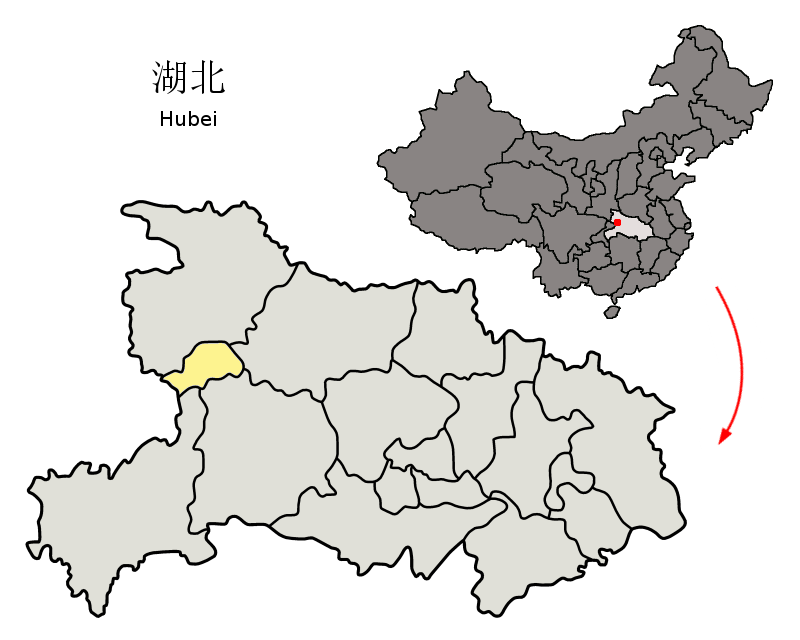
- Location of Shennongjia in Hubei

- Location of the district seat in Hubei
- Coordinates (Shennongjia government): 31°44′41″N 110°40′33″E
- Country: People's Republic of China
- Province: Hubei
- Seat: Songbai

Government
  - Mayor: Zhou Senfeng (周森锋)

Area
  - Total: 3,253 km^{2} (1,256 sq mi)

Population (2020)
  - Total: 66,571
  - Density: 20.46/km^{2} (53.00/sq mi)

GDP
  - Total: CN¥ 2.1 billion US$ 0.3 billion
  - Per capita: CN¥ 27,298; US$ 4,383
- Time zone: UTC+8 (China Standard)
- Postal code: 442400
- Administrative division code: 429021
- Website: www.snj.gov.cn

UNESCO World Heritage Site
- Official name: Hubei Shennongjia
- Includes: 1. Shennongding; 2. Laojunshan
- Criteria: Natural: (ix), (x)
- Reference: 1509
- Inscription: 2016 (40th Session)
- Area: 73,318 ha (181,170 acres)
- Buffer zone: 41,536 ha (102,640 acres)

Chinese name
- Simplified Chinese: 神农架林区
- Traditional Chinese: 神農架林區
Transcriptions
Standard Mandarin
- Hanyu Pinyin: Shénnóngjià Línqū
- Wade–Giles: Shen²-nung²-chia⁴ Lin²-chʻü¹

Alternative Chinese name
- Simplified Chinese: 神农架
- Traditional Chinese: 神農架
Transcriptions
Standard Mandarin
- Hanyu Pinyin: Shénnóngjià
- Wade–Giles: Shen²-nung²-chia⁴

Shennongjia Forestry District (Chinese: 神农架林区; pinyin: Shénnóngjià Línqū) is a county-level administrative unit (a "forestry district") in northwestern Hubei province, People's Republic of China, directly subordinated to the provincial government. It occupies 3,253 square kilometres (1,256 sq mi) in western Hubei, and, as of 2007 had the resident population estimated at 74,000 (with the registered population of 79,976). On July 17, 2016, Hubei Shennongjia was listed as a World Heritage Site, the 50th World Heritage Site in China, because of its exceptional floral and faunal biodiversity and its protection of many rare, endangered, and endemic species.

== Administration ==
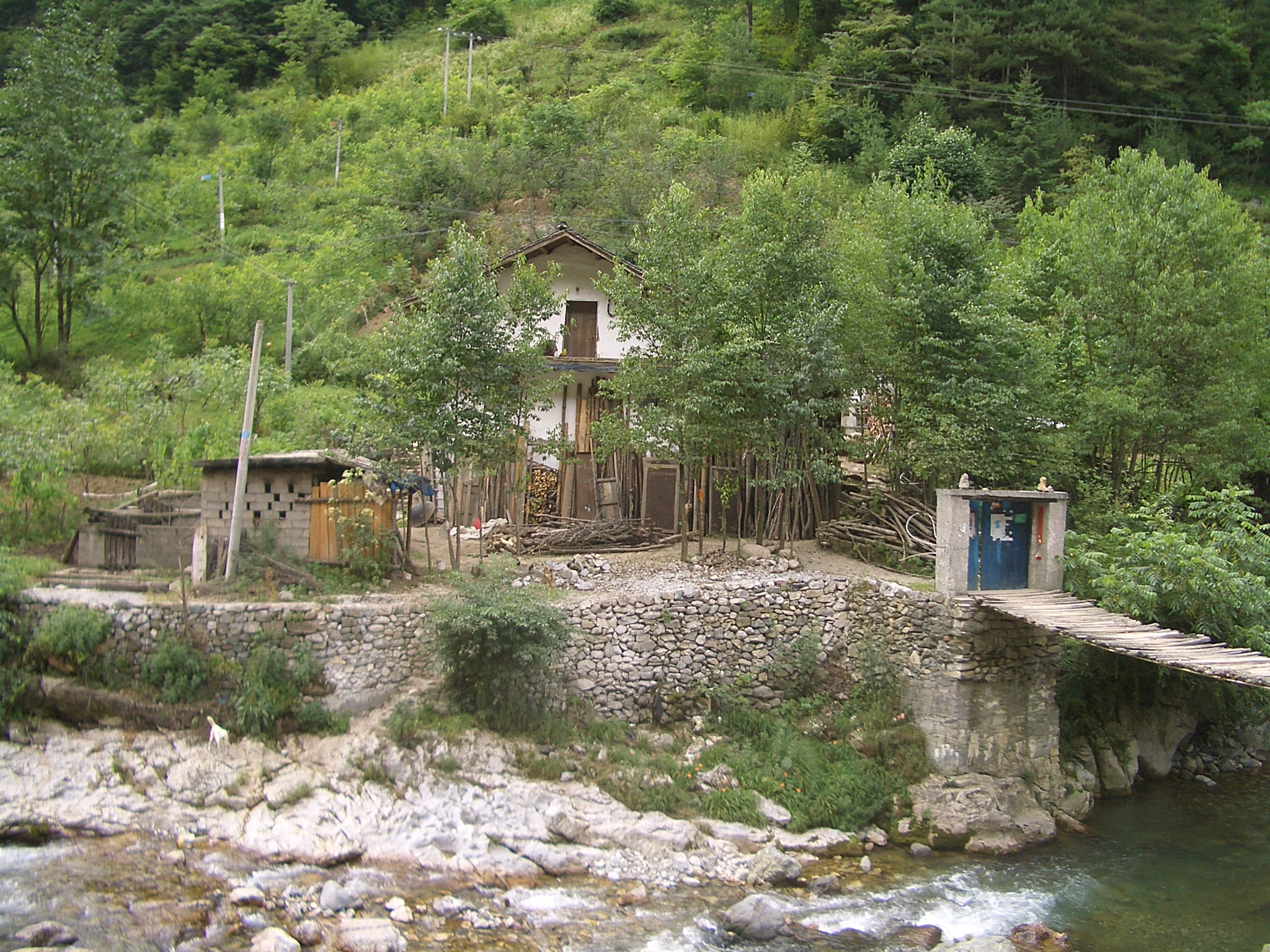
An isolated farmhouse near Wenshui Village (温水村), Hongping Town

The administrative status of Shennongjia is rather unusual, in that it is the only county-level administrative unit of the People's Republic of China designated a "forestry district" (林区), rather than a more usual county or county-level city.

Shennongjia's status within Hubei is also somewhat unusual, in that this county-level unit is directly administered by the provincial government as opposed to be part of a prefecture-level city or prefecture, as are Hubei's all "normal" counties. However, this arrangement is not unique to Shennongjia, as Hubei also has three county-level cities (Xiantao, Tianmen, Qianjiang) which are directly under the provincial government, without being part of a prefecture-level unit.

The district was created on May 28, 1970, from the adjacent areas of Badong County, Baokang County, Fang County and Xingshan County.

Shennongjia is further divided into 6 towns, 1 township, and 1 ethnic township.

Name	Chinese (S)	Hanyu Pinyin	Division type	2010 Population
Songbai	松柏镇	Sōngbǎi Zhèn	Town	31,207
Yangri	阳日镇	Yángrì Zhèn	Town	10,085
Hongping	红坪镇	Hóngpíng Zhèn	Town	5,901
Muyu	木鱼镇	Mùyú Zhèn	Town	9,089
Xinhua	新华镇	Xīnhuá Zhèn	Town	3,688
Dajiuhu (formerly Jiuhu Township)	大九湖镇 (九湖乡)	Dàjiǔhú Zhèn (Jiǔhú Xiāng)	Town	3,657
Songluo Township	宋洛乡	Sòngluò Xiāng	Township	6,609
Xiaguping Tujia Ethnic Township	下谷坪土家族乡	Xiàgǔpíng Tǔjiāzú Xiāng	Ethnic township	5,904

The county seat is in Songbai Town in the northern of the district; the main tourist center is Muyu Town, near the southern border of the district.

There are numerous tourist attractions throughout the district, but, as of 2009, most of the district is closed to foreign tourists, with the exception of a narrow strip along its southern border (south of Yazikou Junction). The open area includes the Shennongjia National Nature Reserve.

== Geography ==
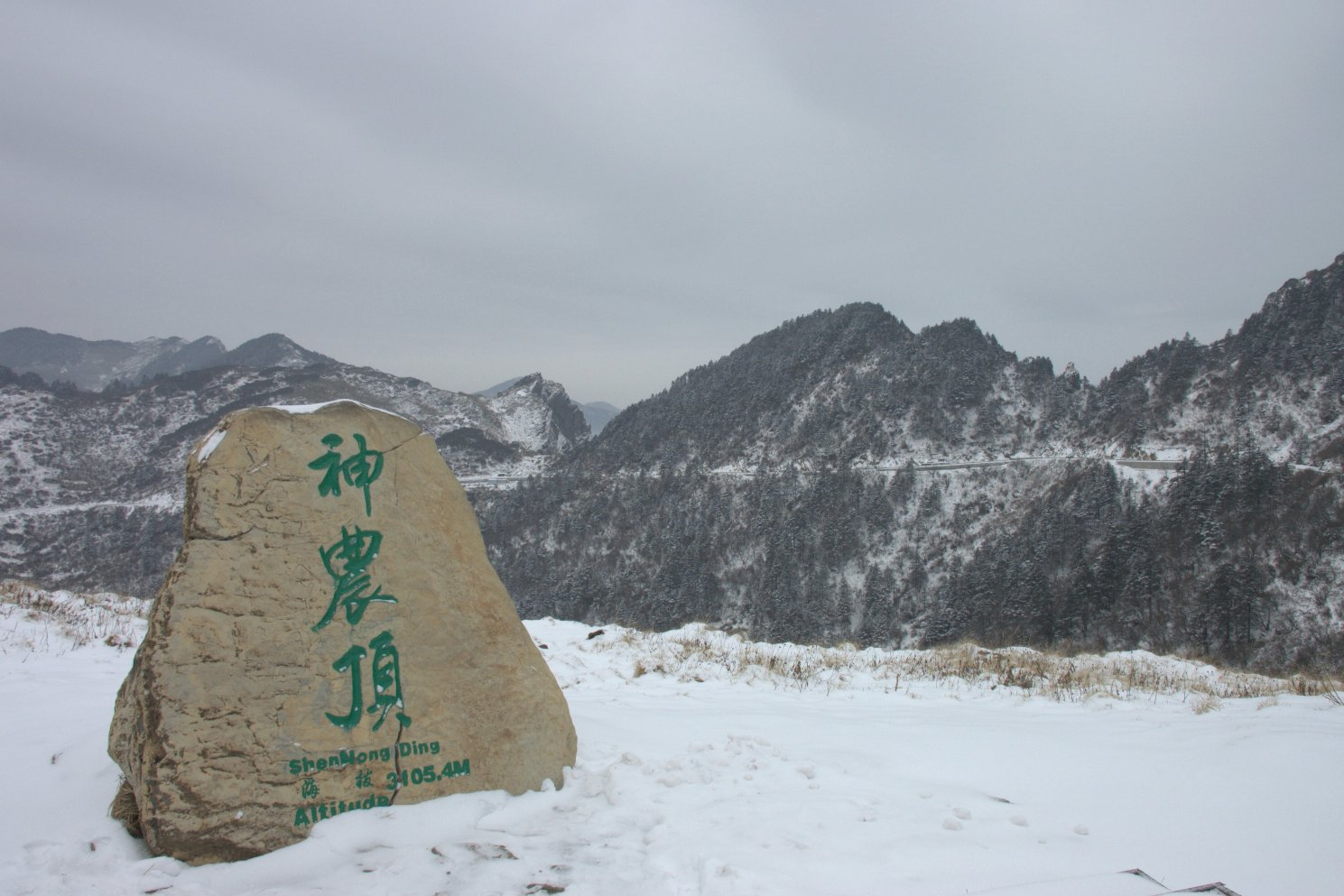
On top of the Shennong Ding (Shennong's Peak)

Shennongjia Forestry District is named after the Shennongjia mountainous massif, which is usually considered to be the eastern (and the highest) section of the Daba Mountains (Daba Shan). The mountains of Shennongjia form a divide between two parts of the district: the central and northern part drains north, into the Han River (a tributary of the Yangtze which joins the Yangtze much farther east, in Wuhan), while the southern section drains into the Yangtze in a more direct way, via a number of short streams flowing south, such as Shen Nong Stream. Some of Hubei's highest mountains - which are also the highest mountains of the Daba Shan - are located within the district. The three tallest peaks, located west of Muyu town, are Shennong Deng (3,105 metres (10,187 ft) elevation), Da Shennongjia (3,052 metres (10,013 ft)), and Xiao Shennongjia (3,005 metres (9,859 ft), on the border with Badong County). Laojun Shan, 2,936 metres (9,633 ft) tall, is located northeast of Muyu.

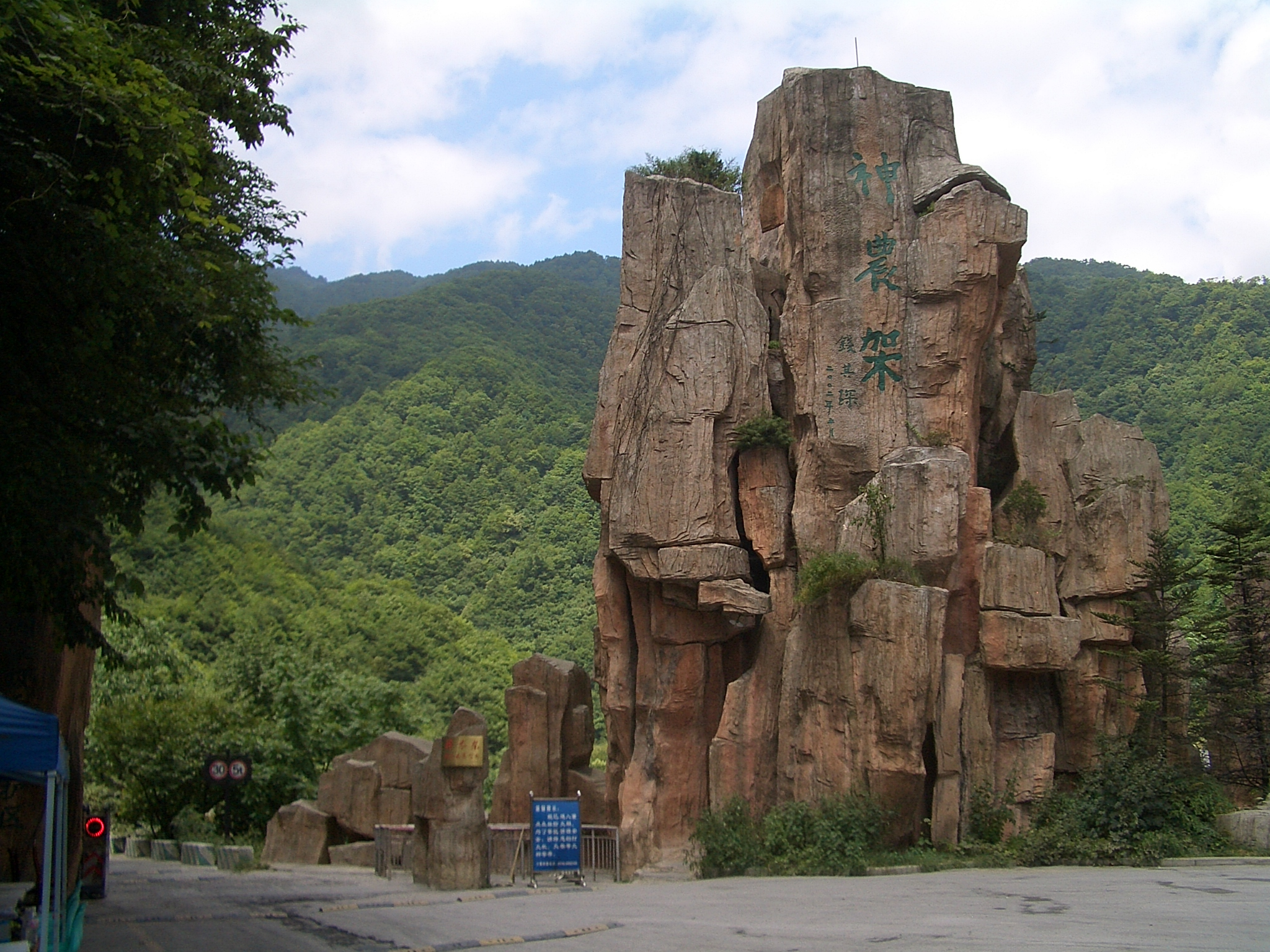
Entrance to Shennongjia National Nature Reserve

== Biodiversity and Conservation ==
Shannongjia Forestry District lies within the Daba Mountains evergreen forests ecoregion.

There are a number of conservation areas in the district's mountains and wetlands, in particular the world-famous Shennongjia National Nature Reserve (神农架国家自然保护区), listed on UNESCO's World Network of Biosphere Reserves. The reserve includes 2,618 square kilometres (1,011 sq mi) of forest, and, due to a variety of natural conditions at different elevations, has high plant diversity. One survey by Chinese botanists reports 3,479 higher plant species found in a certain area. Of those species, 1793 are endemic to China. In fact, the district contains the highest diversity of deciduous woody plant species in the world.

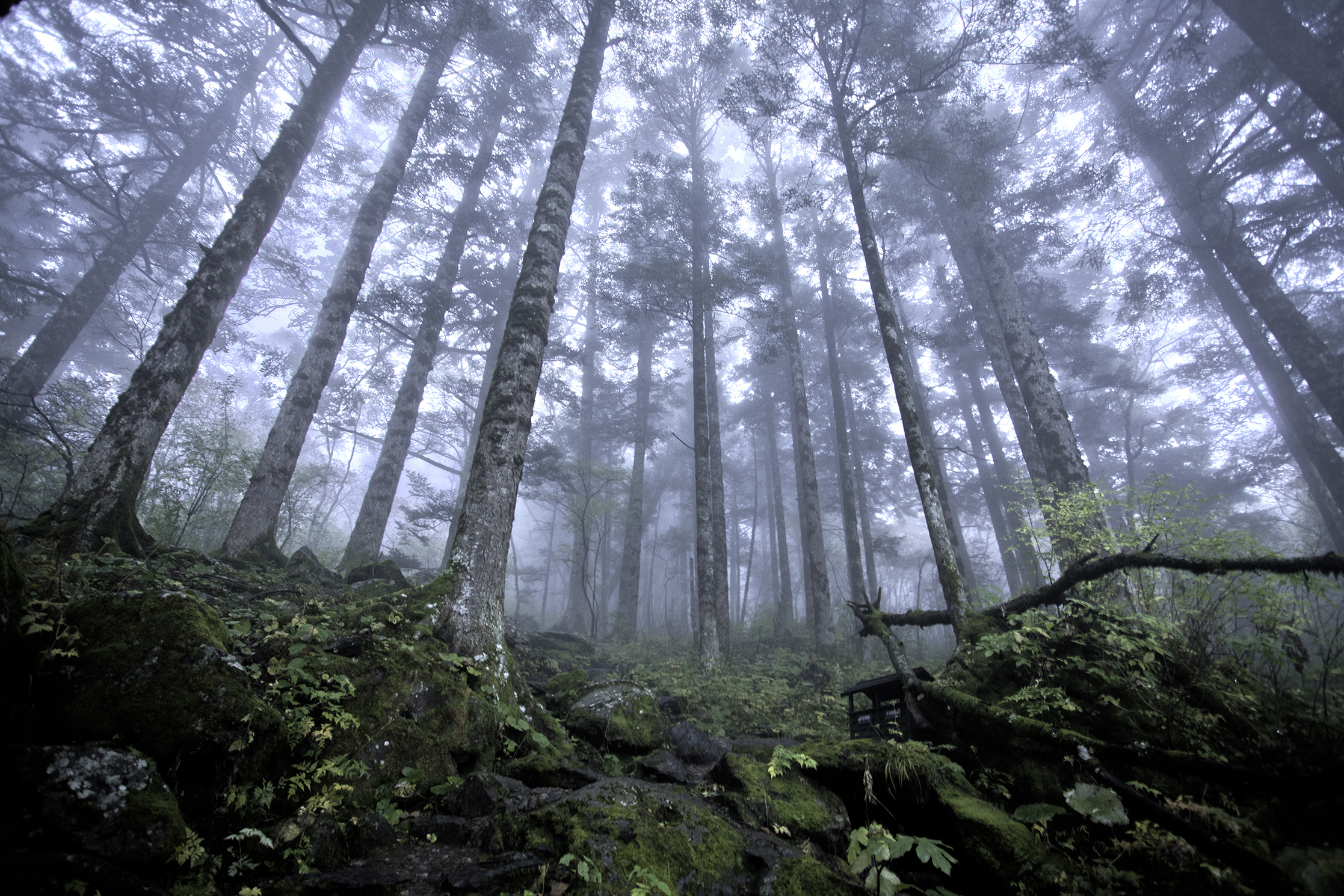
Virgin forest at approx 2500m above sea level

In addition to fostering high plant diversity, the variation in topography and the stability of the region's climate through past glaciation events has allowed for the maintenance of high animal diversity. The protected animal species include golden snub-nosed monkey, whose population in the district was reported to have grown between 1990 and 2005 from 500 to over 1200. A specially protected 100-square-km area is designated for this endangered primate species. Other species in the district include the Chinese giant salamander, the clouded leopard, and the Asiatic black bear Overall, 600 vertebrate species have been observed in the Nature Reserve (92 mammals, 399 birds, 55 fish, 53 reptiles, and 37 amphibians), in addition to 4365 insect species. This district is the type location for many Chinese species.

Shennongjia has sites of scientific interests to paleontologists as well. The Rhino Cave in Hongping Town has been described by Chinese paleontologists as the richest fossil site in the country after Zhoukoudian.

=== Climate ===
Shennongjia has a humid subtropical climate (Köppen: Cwa).

Climate data for Shennongjia, elevation 935 m (3,068 ft), (1991–2020 normals, extremes 1981–present)
Month	Jan	Feb	Mar	Apr	May	Jun	Jul	Aug	Sep	Oct	Nov	Dec	Year
Record high °C (°F)	19.8 (67.6)	25.3 (77.5)	30.7 (87.3)	33.1 (91.6)	35.3 (95.5)	35.6 (96.1)	38.0 (100.4)	37.6 (99.7)	36.9 (98.4)	31.5 (88.7)	25.8 (78.4)	19.4 (66.9)	38.0 (100.4)
Mean daily maximum °C (°F)	6.4 (43.5)	9.1 (48.4)	14.2 (57.6)	20.2 (68.4)	23.5 (74.3)	26.9 (80.4)	29.0 (84.2)	28.0 (82.4)	23.5 (74.3)	18.7 (65.7)	13.9 (57.0)	8.5 (47.3)	18.5 (65.3)
Daily mean °C (°F)	1.1 (34.0)	3.4 (38.1)	7.8 (46.0)	13.5 (56.3)	17.2 (63.0)	20.8 (69.4)	23.2 (73.8)	22.2 (72.0)	18.0 (64.4)	12.9 (55.2)	7.8 (46.0)	2.9 (37.2)	12.6 (54.6)
Mean daily minimum °C (°F)	−2.6 (27.3)	−0.5 (31.1)	3.2 (37.8)	8.2 (46.8)	12.2 (54.0)	16.0 (60.8)	18.8 (65.8)	18.2 (64.8)	14.2 (57.6)	9.1 (48.4)	3.8 (38.8)	−0.9 (30.4)	8.3 (47.0)
Record low °C (°F)	−14.0 (6.8)	−10.5 (13.1)	−6.3 (20.7)	−2.3 (27.9)	3.1 (37.6)	7.7 (45.9)	10.6 (51.1)	10.0 (50.0)	6.7 (44.1)	−4.5 (23.9)	−6.5 (20.3)	−13.5 (7.7)	−14.0 (6.8)
Average precipitation mm (inches)	17.9 (0.70)	19.6 (0.77)	46.0 (1.81)	73.0 (2.87)	113.1 (4.45)	132.3 (5.21)	153.0 (6.02)	160.8 (6.33)	98.2 (3.87)	80.7 (3.18)	34.4 (1.35)	22.9 (0.90)	951.9 (37.46)
Average precipitation days (≥ 0.1 mm)	8.6	9.1	11.6	12.3	14.4	13.7	16.3	15.0	13.6	12.0	9.1	7.2	142.9
Average snowy days	11.4	7.5	4.2	0.4	0	0	0	0	0	0.2	2.0	6.9	32.6
Average relative humidity (%)	69	69	68	68	72	75	80	81	81	79	73	68	74
Mean monthly sunshine hours	109.8	103.7	136.2	154.8	164.1	164.3	183.6	183.1	137.5	130.8	124.2	116.0	1,708.1
Percentage possible sunshine	34	33	36	40	38	39	43	45	38	37	40	37	38
Source: China Meteorological Administration all-time extreme temperature All-time October high

== Economy ==
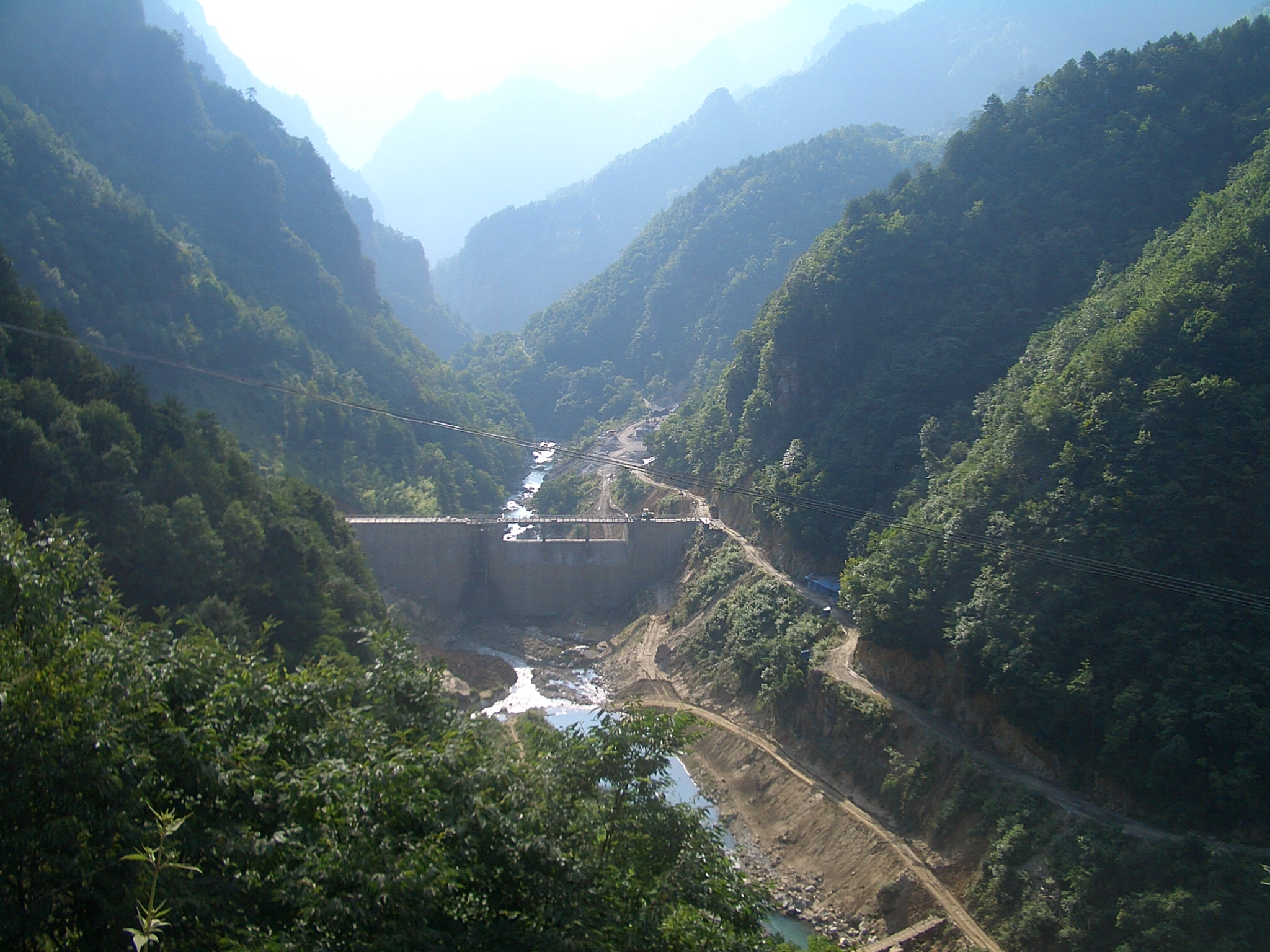
A hydroelectric dam under construction south of Hongping Town, Shennongjia

The district is mountainous and (as its name suggested) heavily forested, which, historically, made forestry the main industry. Over 100,000 cubic meters of timber was produced in the district annually from the 1960s to 1980s (over 1,000,000 cubic metres (35,000,000 cu ft) in the 1970s), but in the late 1990s the focus was switched from logging to forest conservation. Officially, felling of natural forest completely ceased in March 2000.

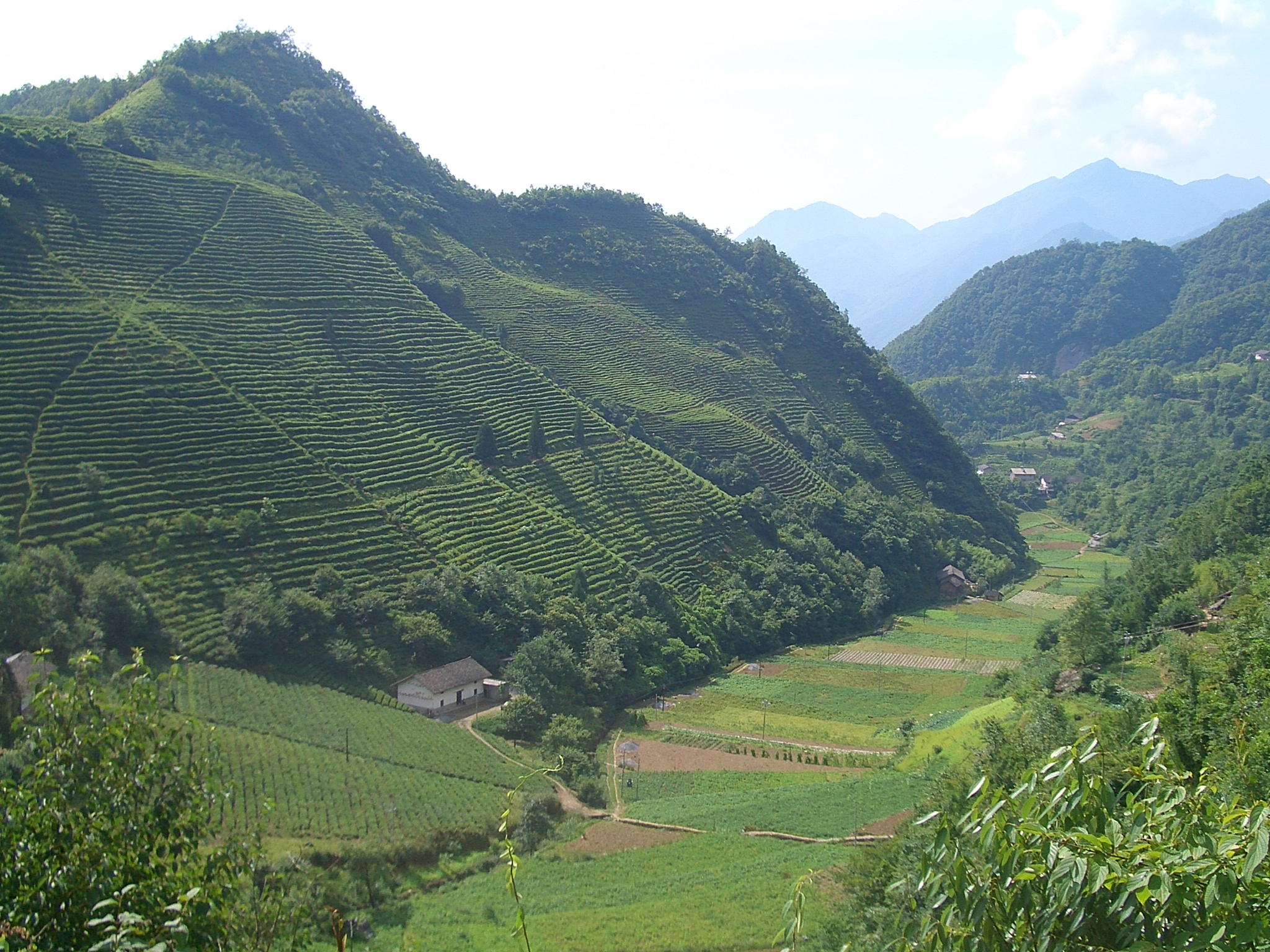
Tea plantations on a valley slope north of Muyu

The district's low population, compared to a typical Hubei county of a similar size, means comparatively small amount of agriculture; nonetheless, the district tries to put itself on the world map as a tea producer. There are mining operations throughout the district.

As elsewhere in the mountainous western Hubei, numerous small hydroelectric plants utilize the energy of Shennongjia's rivers and streams.

Numerous tourist facilities operate along the China National Highway 209, in particular in and around Muyu Town.

On average, the area remains comparatively poor, with the GDP per capita lower than any of Hubei's prefecture-level units. Of course, direct comparison between Shennongjia and a prefecture-level unit of Hubei such as Yichang or Huangshi can be misleading, since nearly all of Hubei's prefecture-level units have a large urbanized core (with corresponding higher incomes), while Shennongjia does not.

== Transportation ==
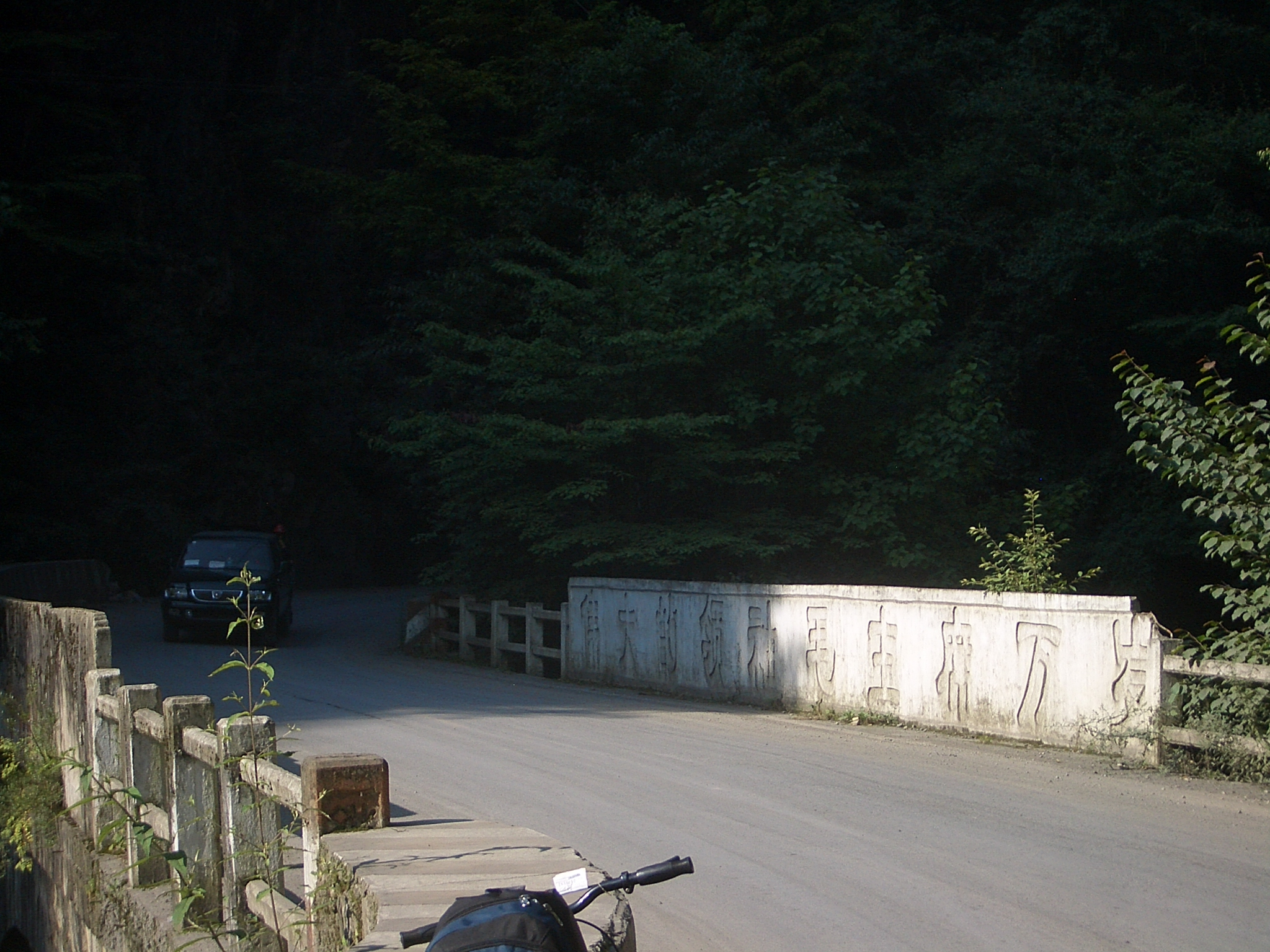
A Cultural Revolution-era bridge on G209

The main north–south route throughout the district is China National Highway 209 (G209), which, however, as of 2009 is still "unimproved" in many places both within district (north of the national park entry at Yazikou) and in Badong County south of it. In practice most visitors enter the district from its southern border, traveling along a provincial highway from Yichang, which merges with G209 near Gaoyang in Xingshan County. This route is a good paved road, designated as the Yi-Shen (Yichang-Shennongjia) Route.

Hubei Provincial Route 307 (S307) runs through the northeastern part of the district, from G209 east to Songbai Town and on into the neighboring Baokang County (part of Xiangyang prefecture-level city).

In May 2021, Shennongjia was connected to the expressway network through the Baoshen Expressway, a branch expressway of the G59 Expressway.

Due to the mountainous terrain, the district has no rail or water transport, and until recently, no air transportation. Despite the difficult and fragile terrain, construction of Shennongjia Hongping Airport started in April 2011 with an investment of 1 billion yuan. Located west of Hongping Town, the airport opened in May 2014.

== Mythology ==
The name Shennongjia comes from the name of the mythical deity/legendary emperor Shennong and jia, meaning ladder: literally, "Shennong's ladder", after a mythical rattan ladder which Shennong was said to use to climb up and down the mountain (later, the ladder was said to have magically transformed into a deep forest).

The people of Shennongjia preserved the Epic of Darkness, a collection of tales and legends of primeval China in epic poetry.

== See also ==
- List of ultras of Tibet, East Asia and neighbouring areas
