= Xinhua, Shennongjia =

Xinhua 新华镇
- Town
- Location in Hubei
- Coordinates: 31°35′47″N 110°53′19″E
- Country: People's Republic of China
- Province: Hubei
- Forestry district: Shennongjia
- Village-level divisions: 1 residential community 9 villages

Area
  - Total: 276 km^{2} (107 sq mi)
- Elevation: 731 m (2,398 ft)

Population (2010)
  - Total: 3,688
  - Density: 13.4/km^{2} (34.6/sq mi)
- Time zone: UTC+8 (China Standard)
- Area code: 0719

Xinhua (simplified Chinese: 新华; traditional Chinese: 新華; pinyin: Xīnhuá; lit. 'new China') is a town directly administered by Shennongjia Forestry District, in northwestern Hubei, China, located 26 kilometres (16 mi) southeast of the district seat and 101 kilometres (63 mi) northwest of Yichang. As of 2011, it has one residential community (社区) and nine villages under its administration.

== Administrative Divisions ==
Residential communities:

- Zhangshuping (樟树坪社区)

Villages:

- Longkou (龙口村), Longtan (龙潭村), Gaobaiyan (高白岩村), Taoping (桃坪村), Maluchang (马鹿场村), Daling (大岭村), Mao'erguan (猫儿观村), Shiwotou (石屋头村), Bao'erdong (豹儿洞村)

== See also ==
- List of township-level divisions of Hubei
