= Muyu, Hubei =

Muyu 木鱼镇
- Town
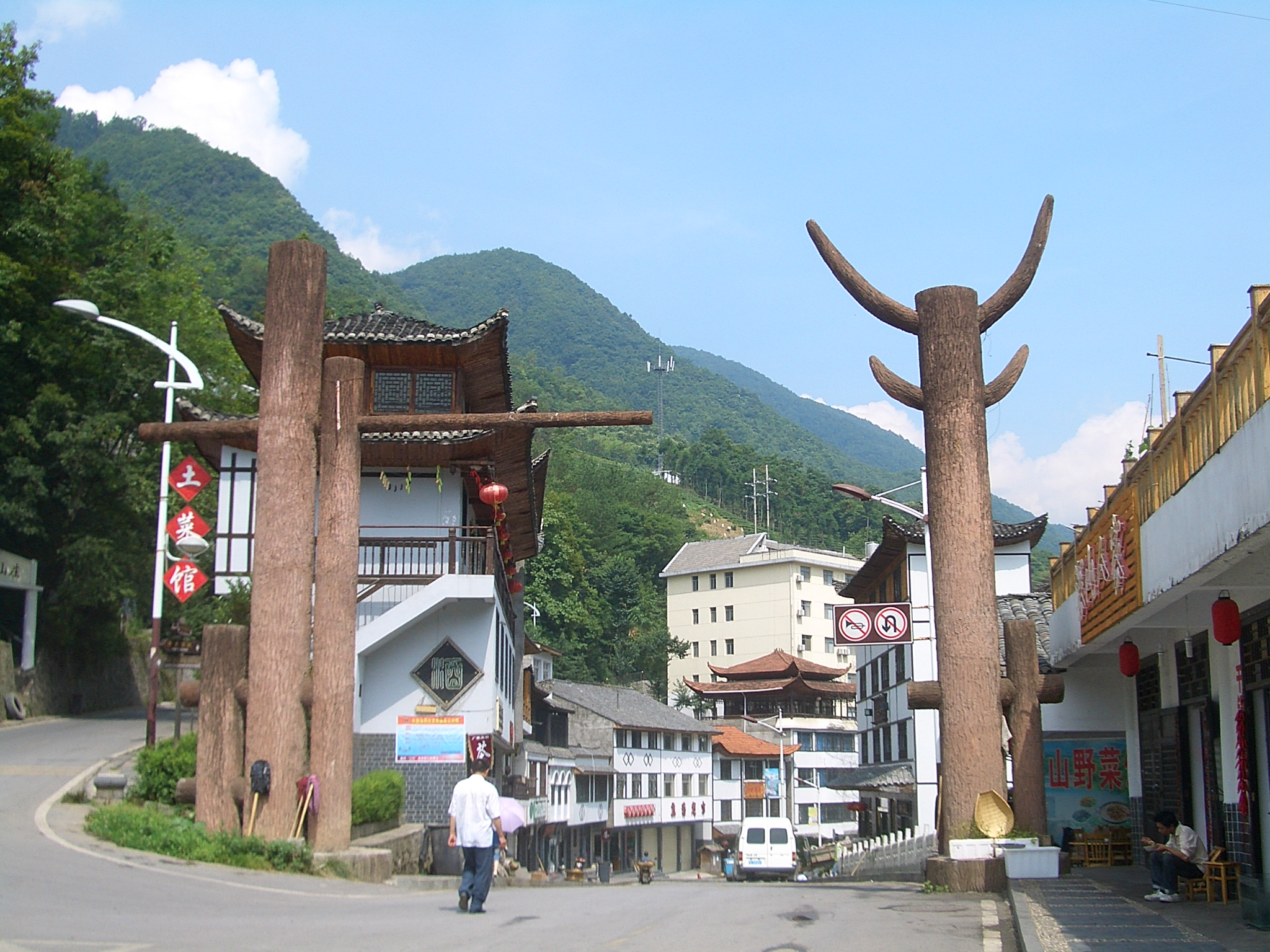
- In Muyu's main street

- Location in Hubei
- Coordinates: 31°28′14″N 110°23′39″E
- Country: People's Republic of China
- Province: Hubei
- Forestry District: Shennongjia
- Elevation: 1,216 m (3,990 ft)

Population (2010)
  - Total: 9,089
- Time zone: UTC+8 (China Standard)

Muyu (simplified Chinese: 木鱼; traditional Chinese: 木魚; pinyin: Mùyú; literally, "Wooden fish"; sometimes also 木鱼坪, Muyuping) is a town in Shennongjia Forestry District, in the west of Hubei province, People's Republic of China. Located on China National Highway 209, it is the main population and services center of the southern part of the district.

The town is stretched along the upper course of Xiang Stream (Xiang Xi) (or perhaps one of its tributaries), which flows from Shennongjia mountains southeast toward the Yangtze. The river valley is paralleled by China National Highway 209.

Serving as the natural "gateway" to Shennongjia National Nature Reserve (the entry to which is at Yazikou Junction, some 10 to 15 kilometres (6.2 to 9.3 mi) north of Muyu), Muyu and its vicinity is the location of most of the hotels and tourist services in the southern part of Shennongjia. Regular minibus service connects it to Yichang and Maoping (Zigui County). There is also less-regular shuttle van service north, to Songbai town (the seat of government of Shennongjia District) and Shiyan; but the road north (beyond Yazikou Junction) is still "unimproved" (as of 2009), and, moreover, that part of Shennongjia is closed to foreigners.

== Administrative Divisions ==
Residential communities:

- Muyuping (木鱼坪社区), Honghuaping (红花坪社区), Xiangxiyuan (香溪源社区)

Villages:

- Honghuaping (红花坪村), Sanduihe (三堆河村), Laojunshan (老君山村), Chaoshuihe (潮水河村), Qingfeng (青峰村), Shennongtan (神农坛村), Muyu (木鱼村), Qingtian (青天村)

== Gallery ==
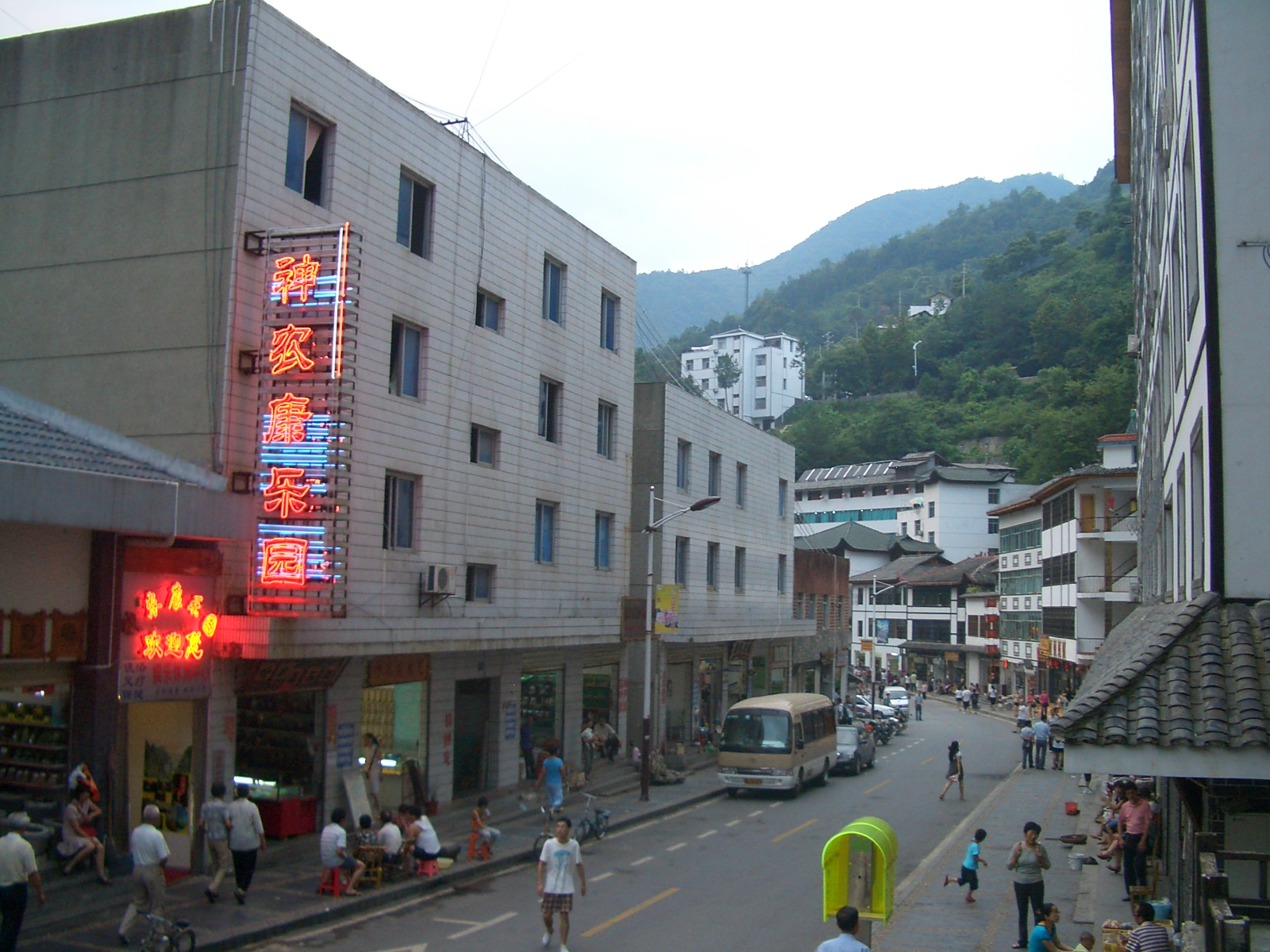
In the evening in Muyu's main street

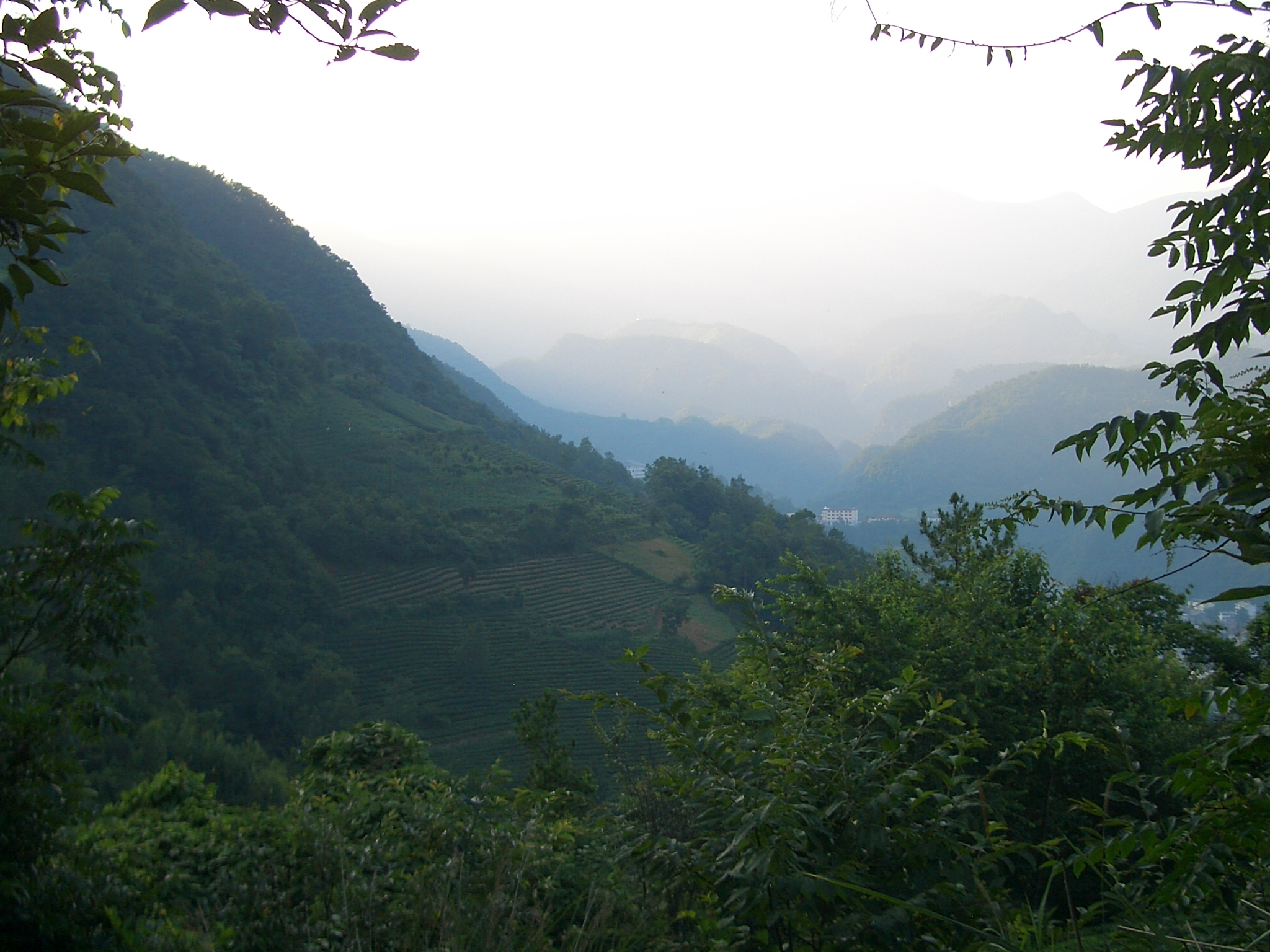
The town nestles in a mountain valley whose slopes are covered with forests and tea plantations

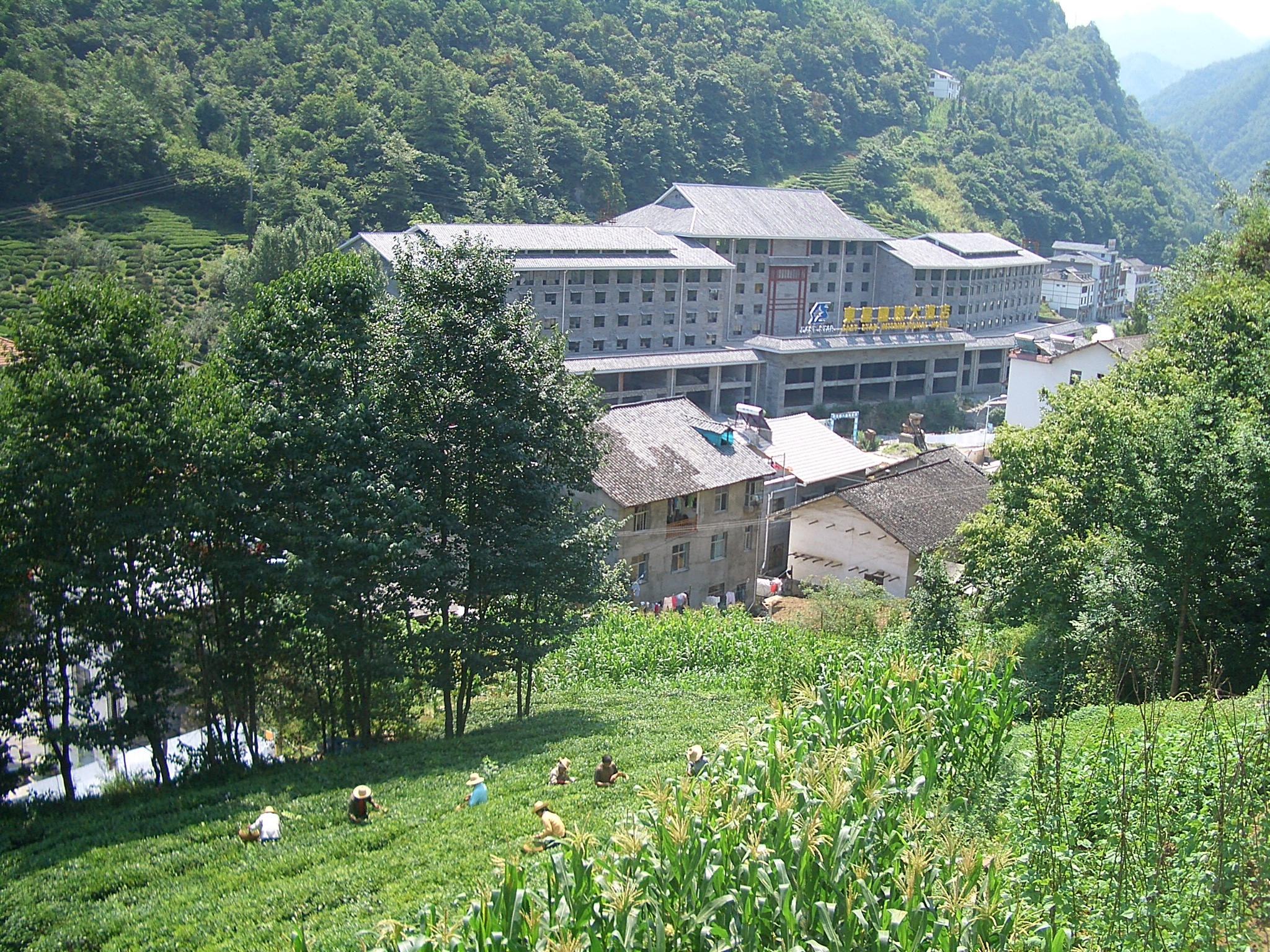
Harvesting tea leaves, on a slope right above the hotel area

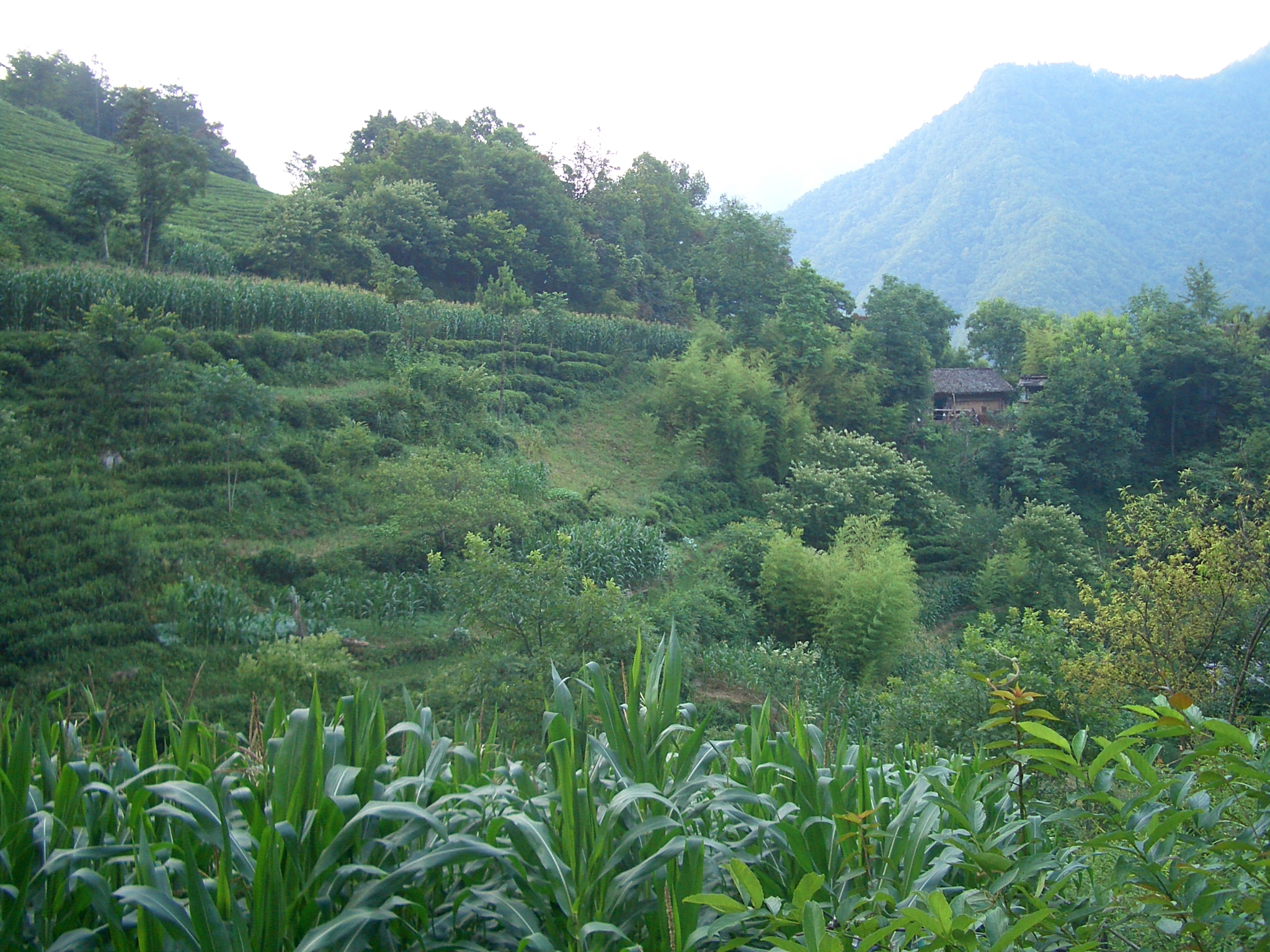
A small farmstead on the hill slopes just outside the town

== See also ==
- List of township-level divisions of Hubei
