= Xiakou, Hubei =

Xiakou 峡口镇
- Town
- Location in Hubei
- Coordinates: 31°7′10″N 110°46′41″E
- Country: People's Republic of China
- Province: Hubei
- Prefecture-level city: Yichang
- County: Xingshan County
- Time zone: UTC+8 (China Standard)

Xiakou (simplified Chinese: 峡口; traditional Chinese: 峽口; pinyin: Xiákǒu) is a town under the administration of Xingshan County, Hubei, China.

As of 2018, it has one residential community and 15 villages under its administration.

== See also ==
- List of township-level divisions of Hubei
