= Xingshan County =

Xingshan County 兴山县 Hingshan
- County
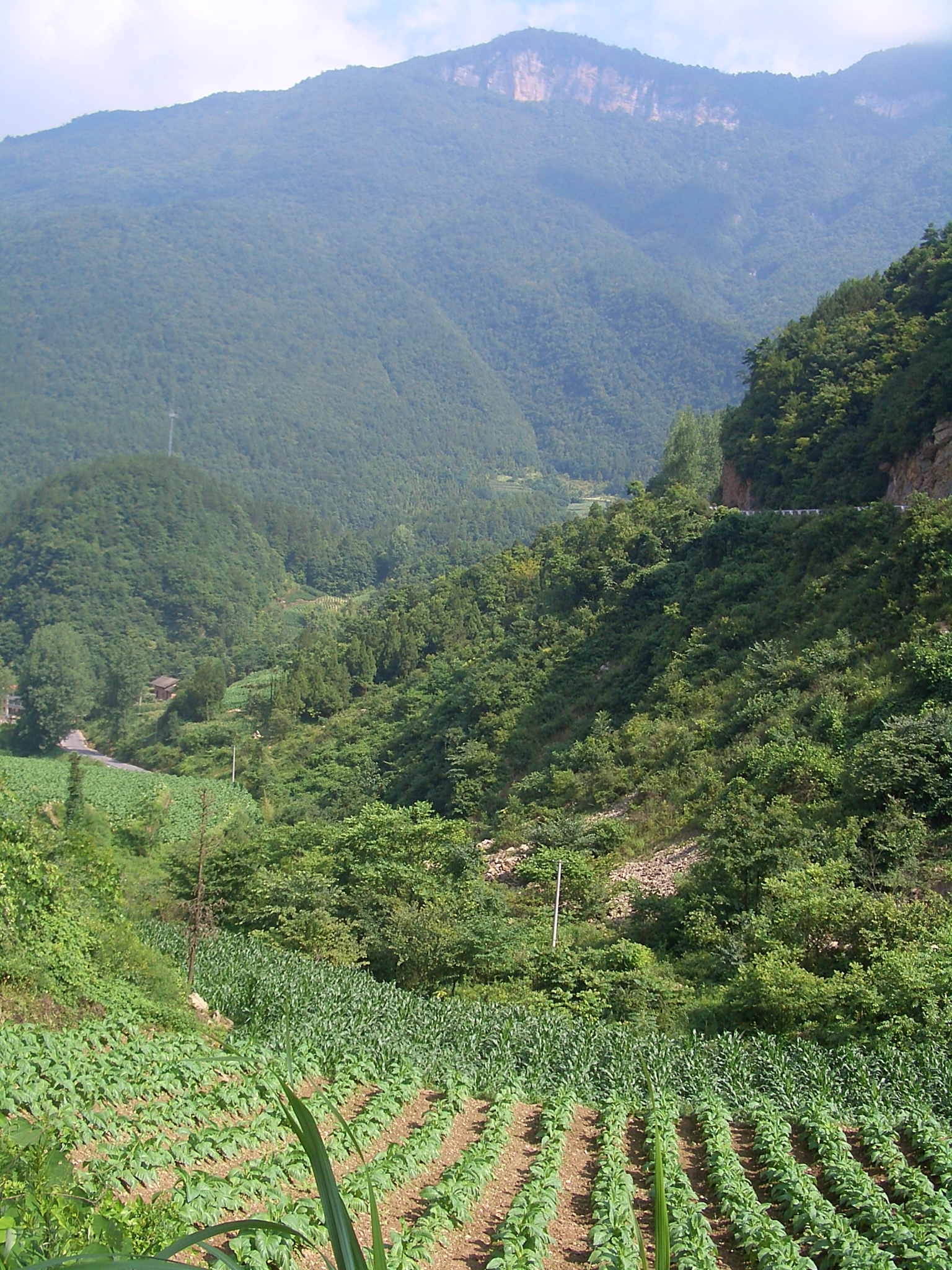
- Near Wujiaping (between Gaoqiao and Nanyang)

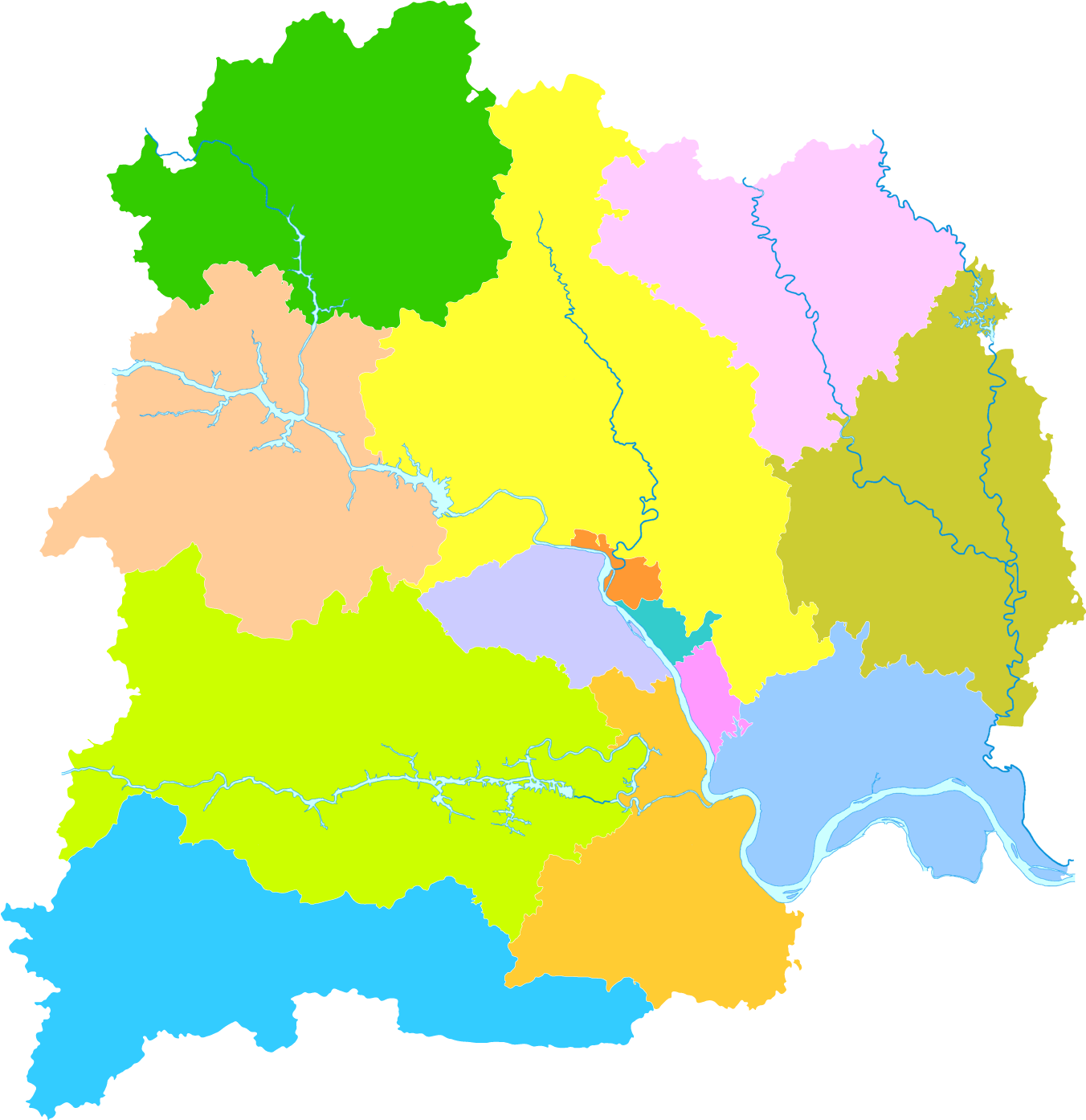
- Xingshan is the northernmost division on this map of Yichang

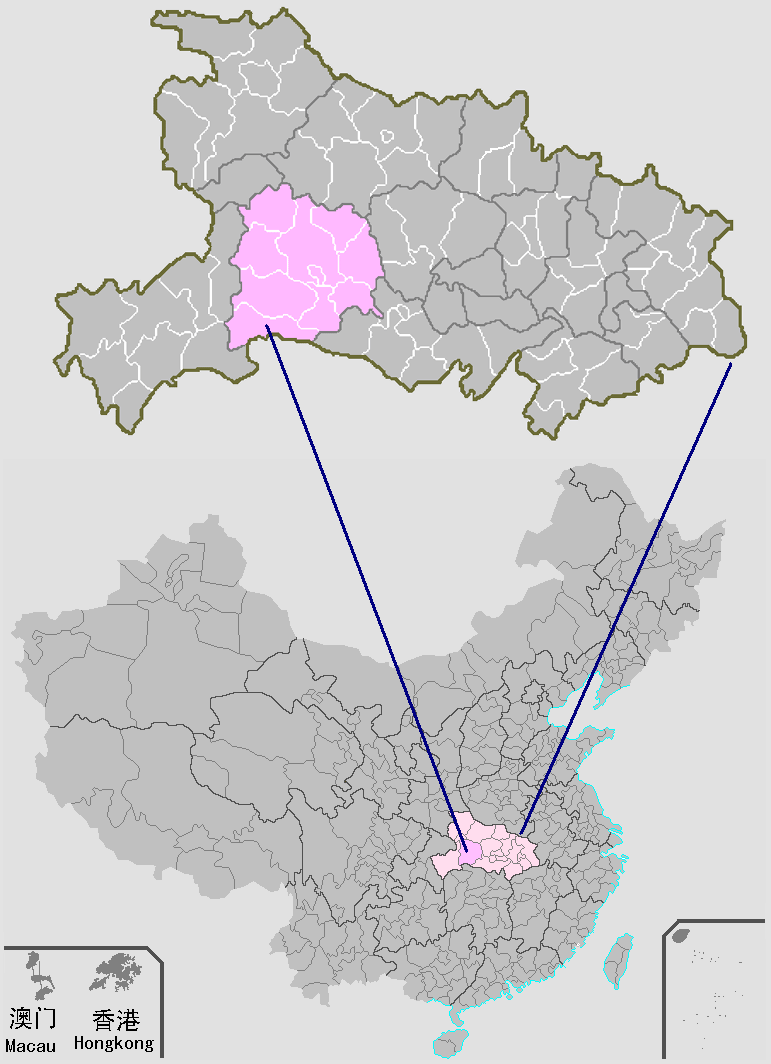
- Yichang in Hubei
- Coordinates (Xingshan government): 31°20′53″N 110°44′49″E
- Country: People's Republic of China
- Province: Hubei
- Prefecture-level city: Yichang

Area
  - Total: 2,316 km^{2} (894 sq mi)

Population (2020)
  - Total: 133,886
  - Density: 57.81/km^{2} (149.7/sq mi)
- Time zone: UTC+8 (China Standard)
- Website: Xingshan County People's Government (in Chinese); Xingshan County People's Government (English Version)

Xingshan County (simplified Chinese: 兴山县; traditional Chinese: 興山縣; pinyin: Xīngshān Xiàn) is a county of western Hubei, People's Republic of China. It is under the administration of Yichang Prefecture-level City.

== Geography ==
The county occupies the mountainous north-western corner of Yichang prefecture ("prefecture-level city"), bordering on Badong County in the west and Shennongjia in the north. The highest mountains within the county are Mount Wanchao (2,253 metres (7,392 ft) elevation) and Mount Wanfu (1,819 metres (5,968 ft)).

The county seat is in Gaofu town; this is the location that is simply marked as "Xingshan" on less detailed maps.

Although the county is away from the Yangtze River itself, and most of its land is at high elevations, the construction of the Three Gorges Dam resulted in the flooding of the valley of the Yangtze's tributary Xiang Xi (香溪, "Fragrant Stream"), where many of the county's residents lived. Accordingly, some 20,000 residents had to be relocated from the flooded areas. It is officially part of the Three Gorges Reservoir Region.

== Climate ==
Climate data for Xingshan, elevation 337 m (1,106 ft), (1991–2020 normals, extremes 1981–present)
Month	Jan	Feb	Mar	Apr	May	Jun	Jul	Aug	Sep	Oct	Nov	Dec	Year
Record high °C (°F)	21.0 (69.8)	27.9 (82.2)	36.7 (98.1)	37.5 (99.5)	40.3 (104.5)	41.2 (106.2)	42.2 (108.0)	42.1 (107.8)	43.1 (109.6)	34.7 (94.5)	28.0 (82.4)	21.6 (70.9)	43.1 (109.6)
Mean daily maximum °C (°F)	10.6 (51.1)	13.6 (56.5)	18.7 (65.7)	24.6 (76.3)	28.0 (82.4)	31.4 (88.5)	34.1 (93.4)	34.0 (93.2)	29.2 (84.6)	23.3 (73.9)	18.0 (64.4)	12.3 (54.1)	23.2 (73.7)
Daily mean °C (°F)	5.6 (42.1)	8.1 (46.6)	12.4 (54.3)	17.7 (63.9)	21.4 (70.5)	25.0 (77.0)	27.5 (81.5)	27.1 (80.8)	23.1 (73.6)	17.6 (63.7)	12.3 (54.1)	7.3 (45.1)	17.1 (62.8)
Mean daily minimum °C (°F)	2.2 (36.0)	4.3 (39.7)	7.8 (46.0)	12.6 (54.7)	16.7 (62.1)	20.5 (68.9)	23.2 (73.8)	22.6 (72.7)	19.0 (66.2)	13.9 (57.0)	8.7 (47.7)	3.8 (38.8)	12.9 (55.3)
Record low °C (°F)	−4.9 (23.2)	−3.7 (25.3)	−1.5 (29.3)	1.8 (35.2)	9.0 (48.2)	12.7 (54.9)	16.6 (61.9)	15.8 (60.4)	11.9 (53.4)	3.0 (37.4)	−0.6 (30.9)	−6.9 (19.6)	−6.9 (19.6)
Average precipitation mm (inches)	14.9 (0.59)	24.8 (0.98)	43.5 (1.71)	85.1 (3.35)	117.9 (4.64)	145.2 (5.72)	150.5 (5.93)	151.5 (5.96)	96.4 (3.80)	84.8 (3.34)	39.4 (1.55)	14.0 (0.55)	968 (38.12)
Average precipitation days (≥ 0.1 mm)	6.5	7.2	10.2	12.0	14.1	12.9	13.1	13.0	11.5	10.8	8.8	6.2	126.3
Average snowy days	2.4	1.6	0.7	0	0	0	0	0	0	0	0.1	0.6	5.4
Average relative humidity (%)	70	68	66	69	72	74	75	73	74	77	77	73	72
Mean monthly sunshine hours	84.4	87.7	121.1	143.0	143.5	149.6	178.8	188.8	132.7	118.5	106.6	94.5	1,549.2
Percentage possible sunshine	26	28	32	37	34	35	42	46	36	34	34	30	35
Source: China Meteorological Administration

== Administrative division ==
The county is administratively divided into 8 township-level divisions: 6 towns and 2 townships.

Six towns:

- Gufu (古夫镇), Zhaojun (昭君镇), Xiakou (峡口镇), Nanyang (南阳镇), Huangliang (黄粮镇), Shuiyuesi (水月寺镇)

Two townships:

- Gaoqiao Township (高桥乡), Zhenzi Township (榛子乡)

== Gallery ==
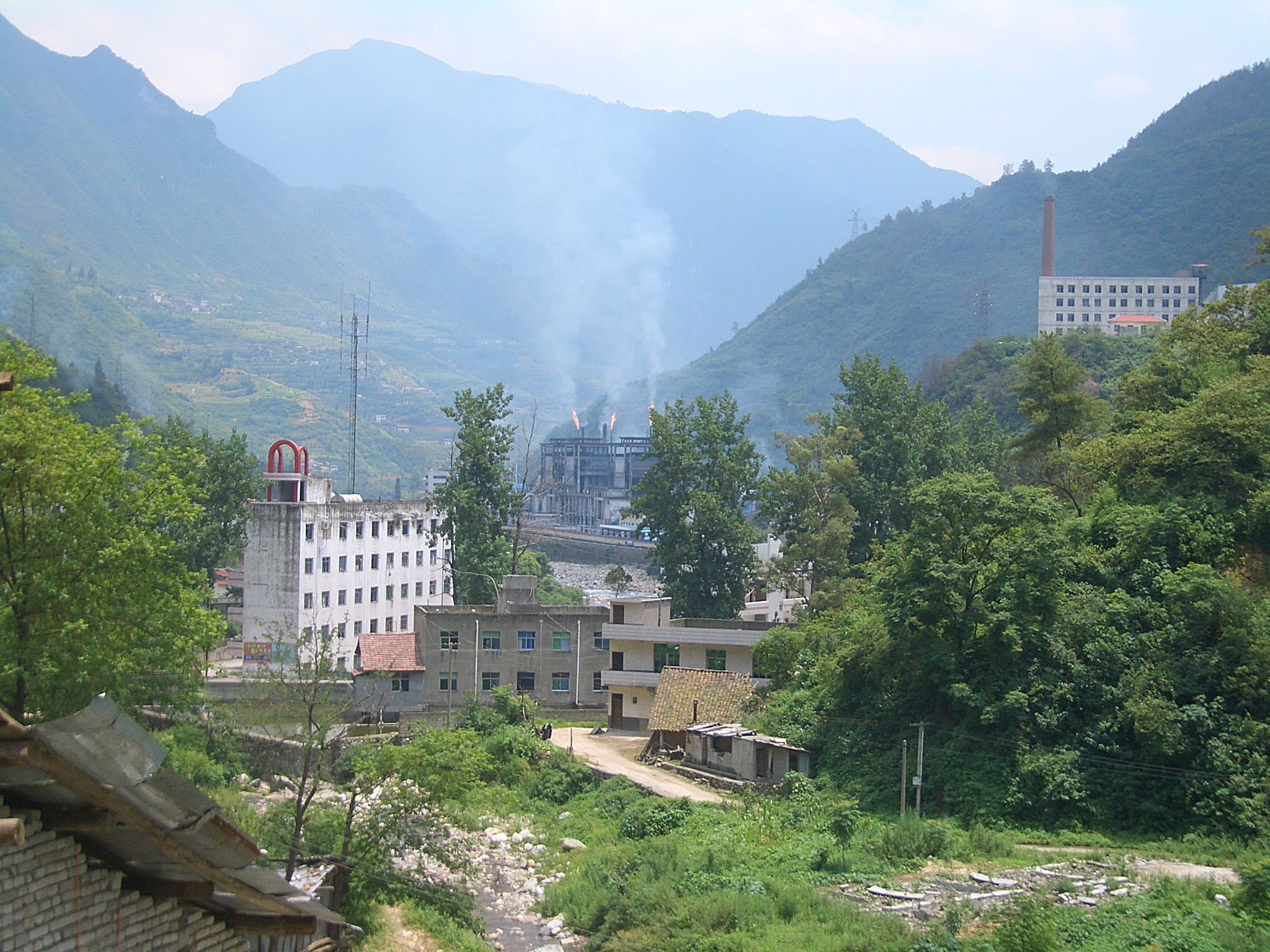
Baishahe Village, Nanyang Town

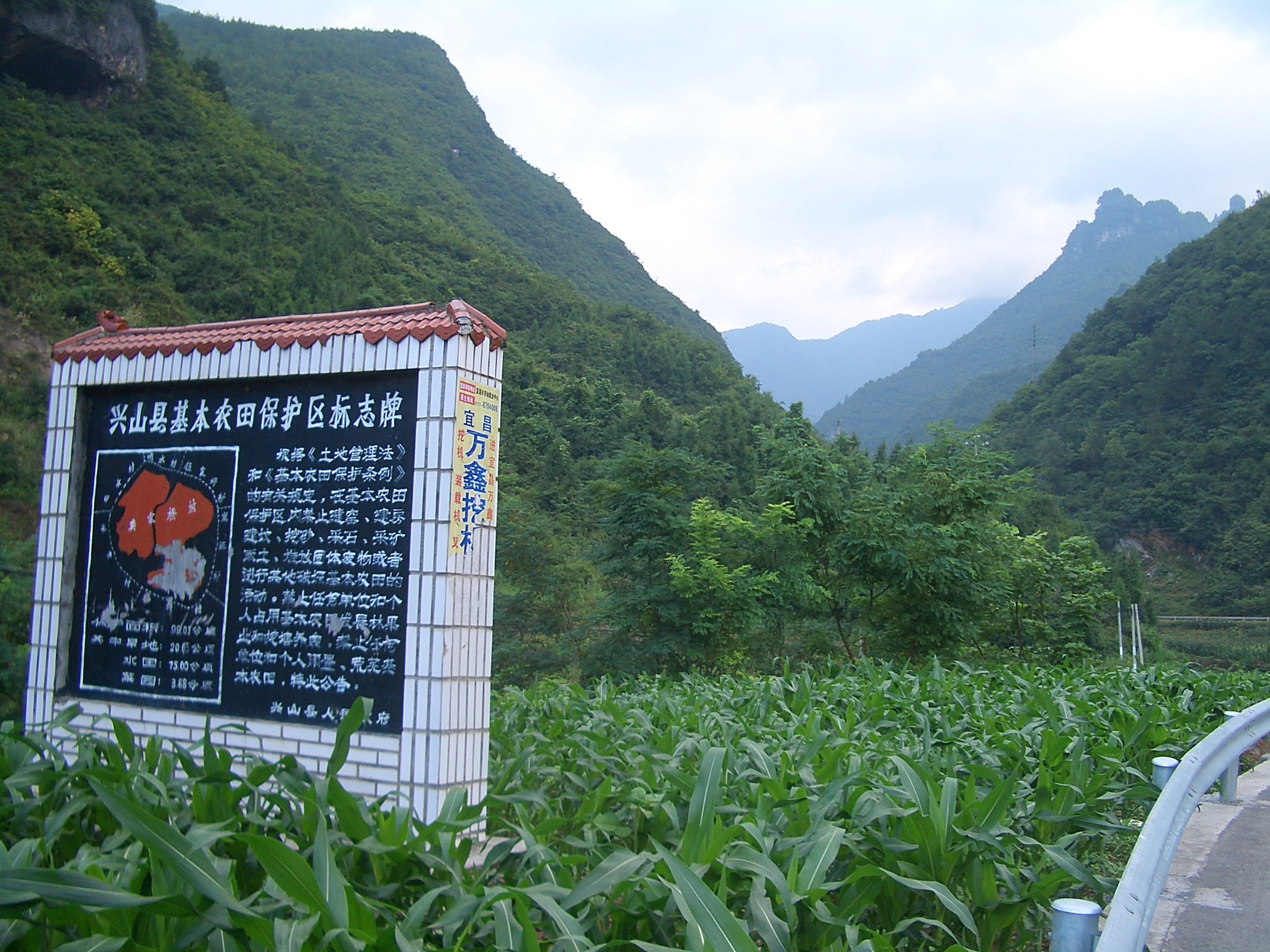
In Liangtai River valley, near Gaoqiao Township

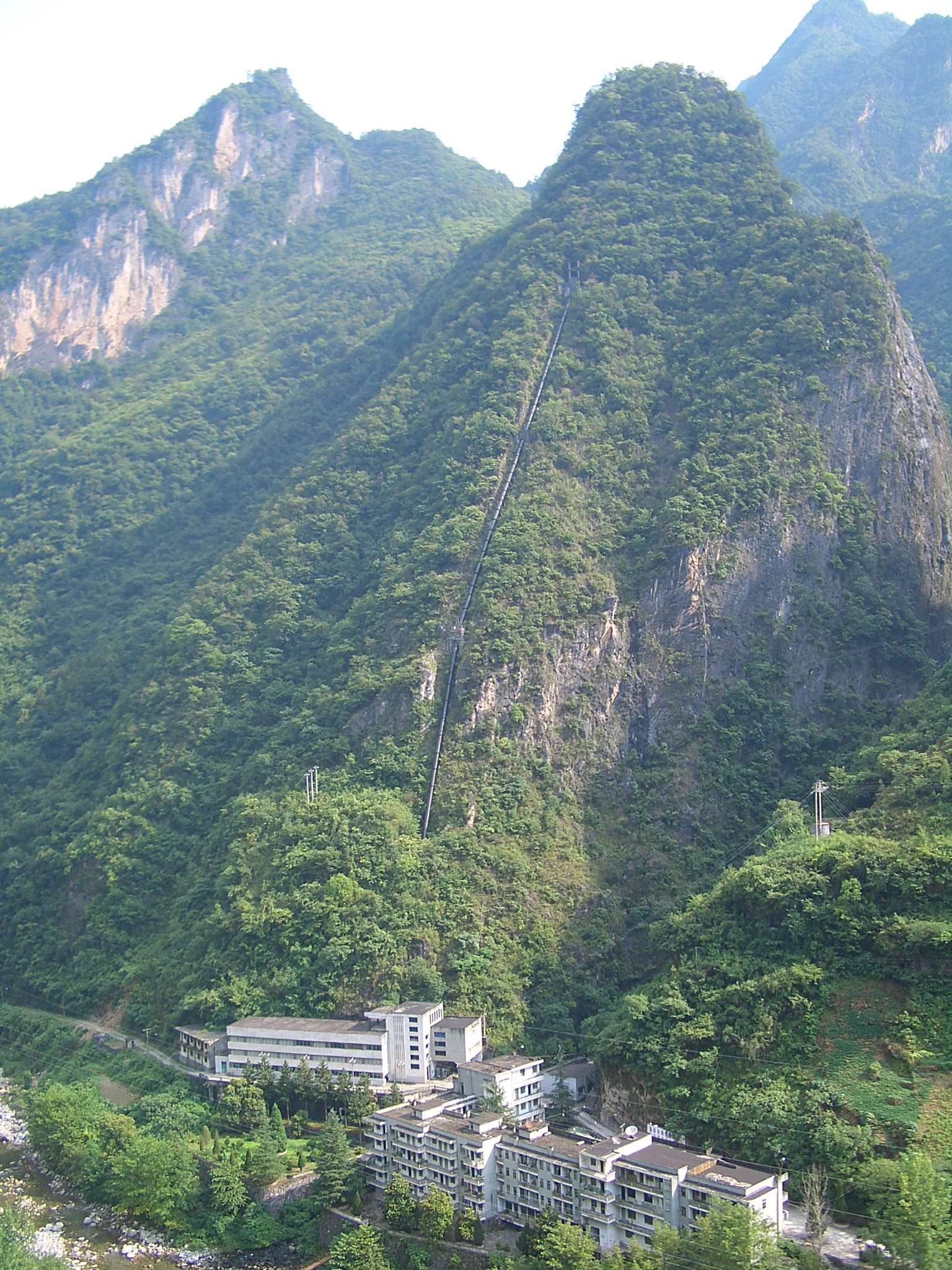
Houzibao Hydroelectric Power Station

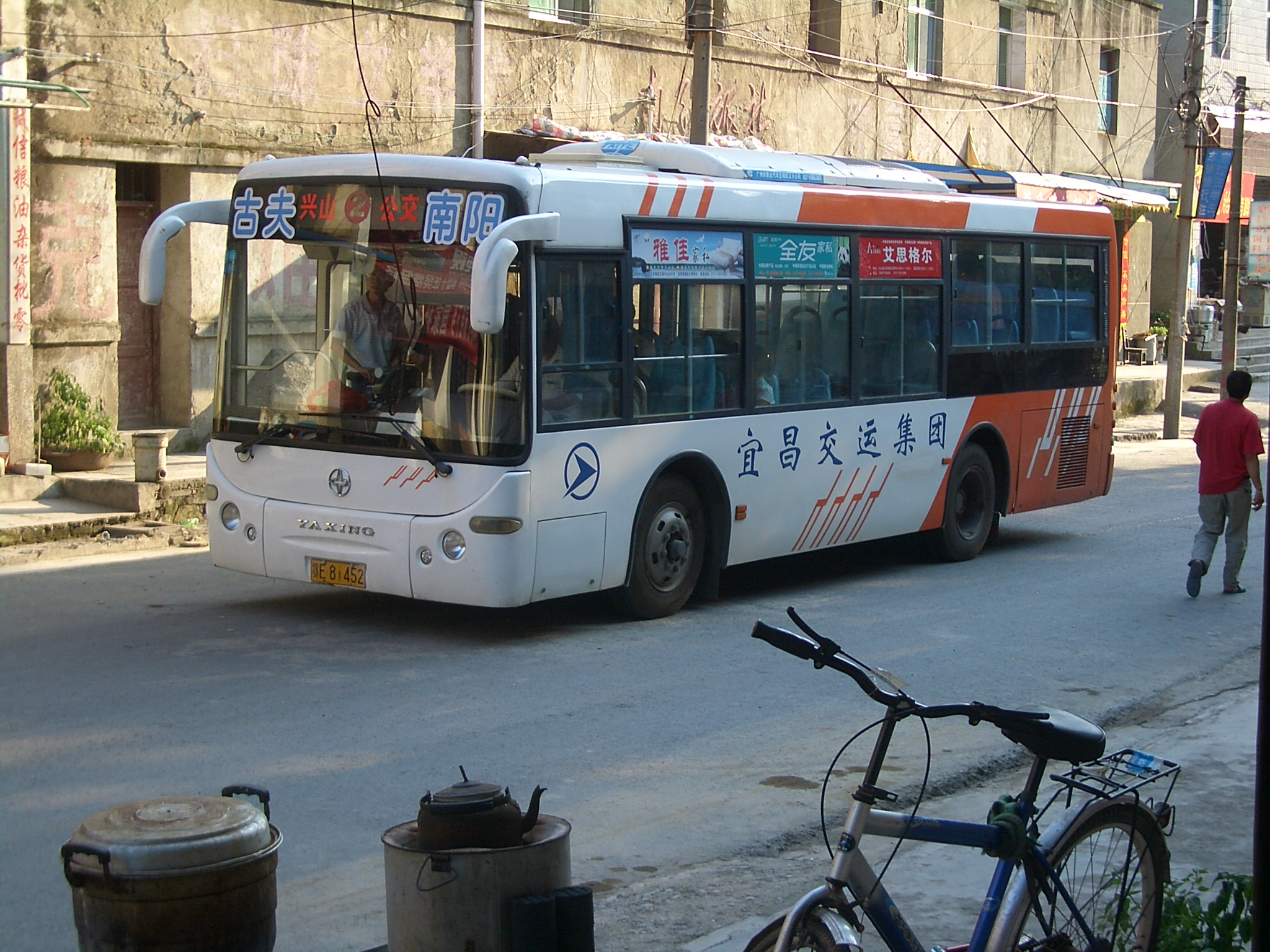
Regular bus service operates between the county seat (Gufu) and other major towns
