= Music of Hubei =

Song form of Hu Chongjun

Hubei is a province of China, known for the Huangmei and Chu opera styles and a wide array of folk songs; Huangmei opera is especially renowned, and has spread to Shanghai, Beijing and Anhui, among other places. In 1986, the Hubei Folk Arts Association published several versions of Darkness, believed to be an ancient Han creation myth, collected mostly in song form by Hu Chongjun.

Modern popular performers from Hubei include Li Qiong and the Hubei Song and Dance Ensemble.
