= Changyang =

Changyang (Chinese: 长阳; pinyin: Chángyáng) may refer to the following places in China:

- Changyang Tujia Autonomous County, Hubei province
- Changyang Railway Station, in the above county
- Changyang Station, of Beijing Subway
- Changyang, Beijing, in Fangshan District of Beijing
