= Yesanguan railway station =

Railway station in Yesanguan Town, China

Yesanguan 野三关
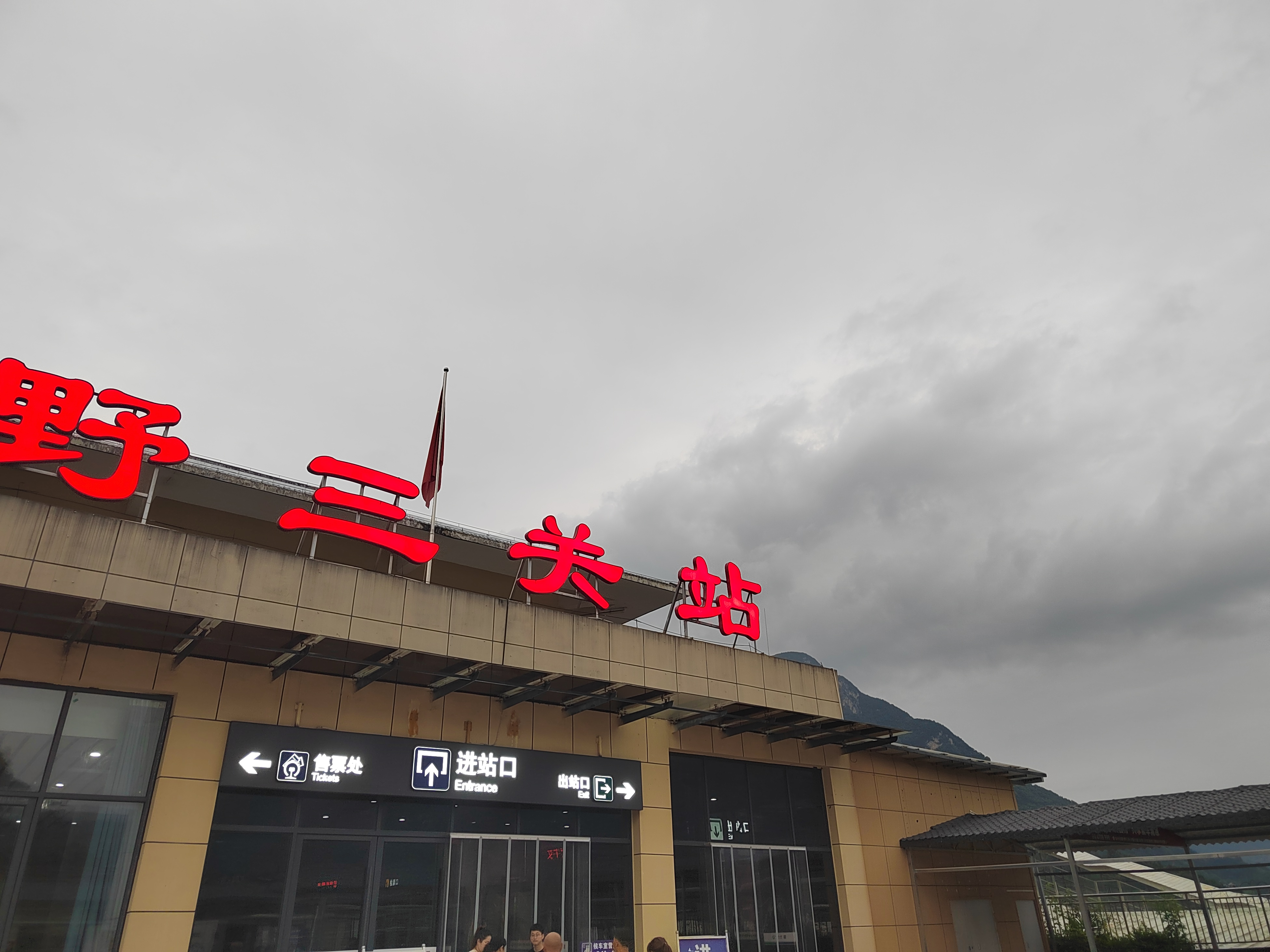

General information
- Location: Yesanguan Town, Badong County, Enshi, Hubei; China
- Coordinates: 30.665022°N 110.353657°E
- Operated by: China Railway Corporation
- Line: Yiwan Railway
Location

Yesanguan railway station (野三关站) is a railway station located in Yesanguan Town, Badong County, Enshi, Hubei Province, People's Republic of China, on the Yiwan Railway which is operated by China Railway Corporation.

The railway station is located near Liujiashan Village (柳家山村, Liǔjiāshān Cūn), about 10 km from the main urban area of Yesanguan Town.

== Name change ==
During the planning stage, the station was referred to as Yesanguan railway station (野三关站), which was a more precise description of its location. However, the station is opened as Badong railway station (巴东站) in 2012, as it is the only railway station within Badong County. It is not particularly closed to Badong County's county seat (Xinling Town), being almost 100 km drive from it on winding mountain roads (S245 and G209).

In 2022, it renamed from Badong railway station to Yesanguan railway station.

== Service ==
A number of the passenger trains running on the Yiwan Railway stop at Yesanguan railway station; this amounts several trains a day both west (to Enshi, Chongqing and Chengdu) and east (to Yichang and Wuhan), as well as some going to more remote destinations, such as Beijing, Shanghai, and Guangzhou.

Preceding station	China Railway High-speed	Following station
Gaoping towards Yichang East	Yichang–Wanzhou railway	Changyang towards Wanzhou
