= Badong County =

Badong County 巴东县 Patung
- County
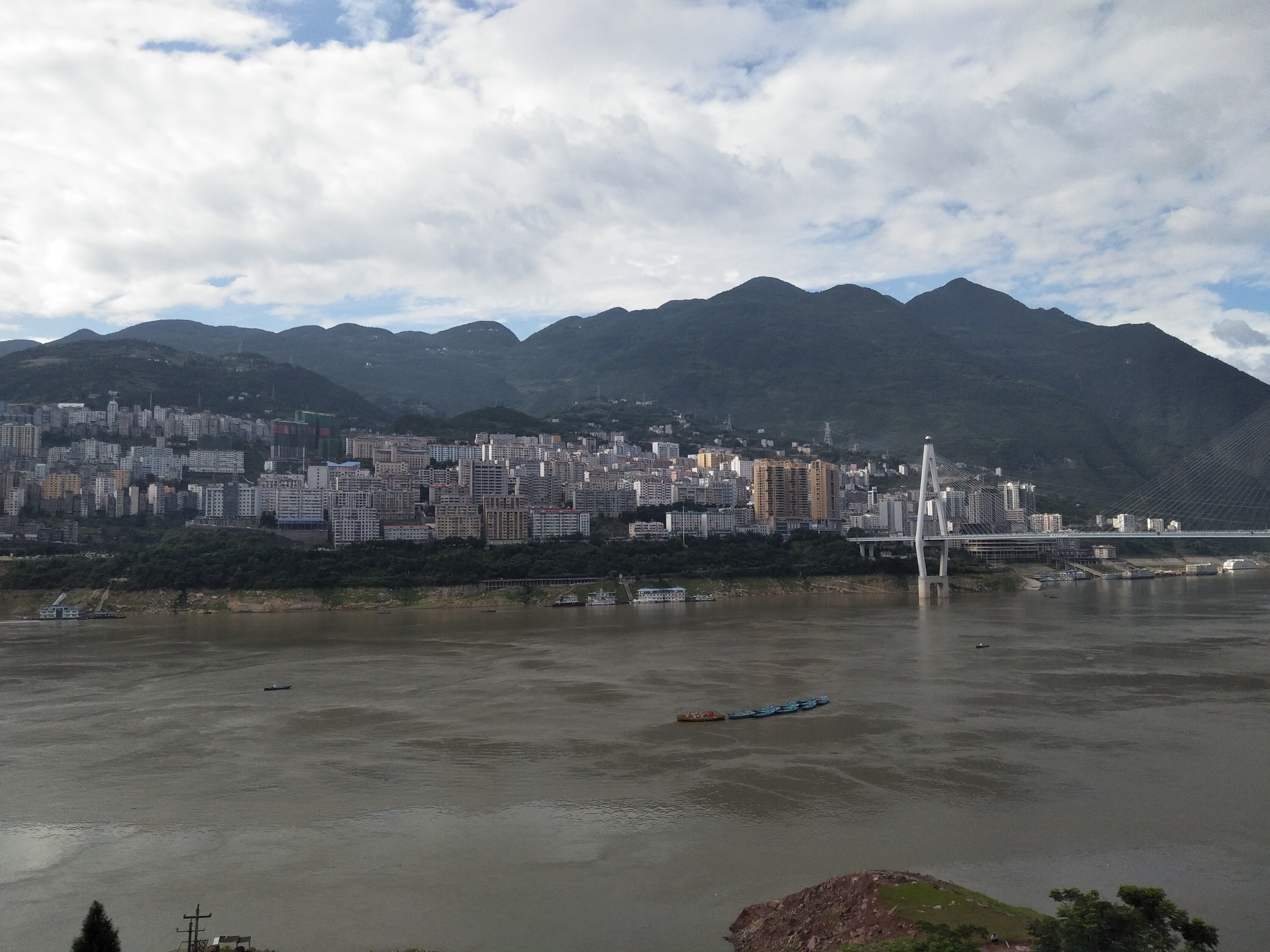

- Location of the seat in Hubei Badong (China)
- Coordinates (Badong County government): 31°02′32″N 110°20′27″E
- Country: People's Republic of China
- Province: Hubei
- Autonomous prefecture: Enshi

Area
  - Total: 3,219 km^{2} (1,243 sq mi)

Population (2020)
  - Total: 395,376
  - Density: 122.8/km^{2} (318.1/sq mi)
- Time zone: UTC+8 (China Standard)
- Website: www.hbbd.gov.cn

Badong County (simplified Chinese: 巴东县; traditional Chinese: 巴東縣; pinyin: Bādōng Xiàn; lit. 'East of (state of) Ba') is a county located in western Hubei province, People's Republic of China, bordering Chongqing municipality to the west. It is the northernmost county-level division under the administration of Enshi Prefecture. The Yangtze River flows through the county and the county seat is located just east of the Wu Gorge in the Three Gorges region.

Badong County is famous for the Shennong Stream gorges located near Badong town. The stream itself falls into the Yangtze opposite the Badong center city.

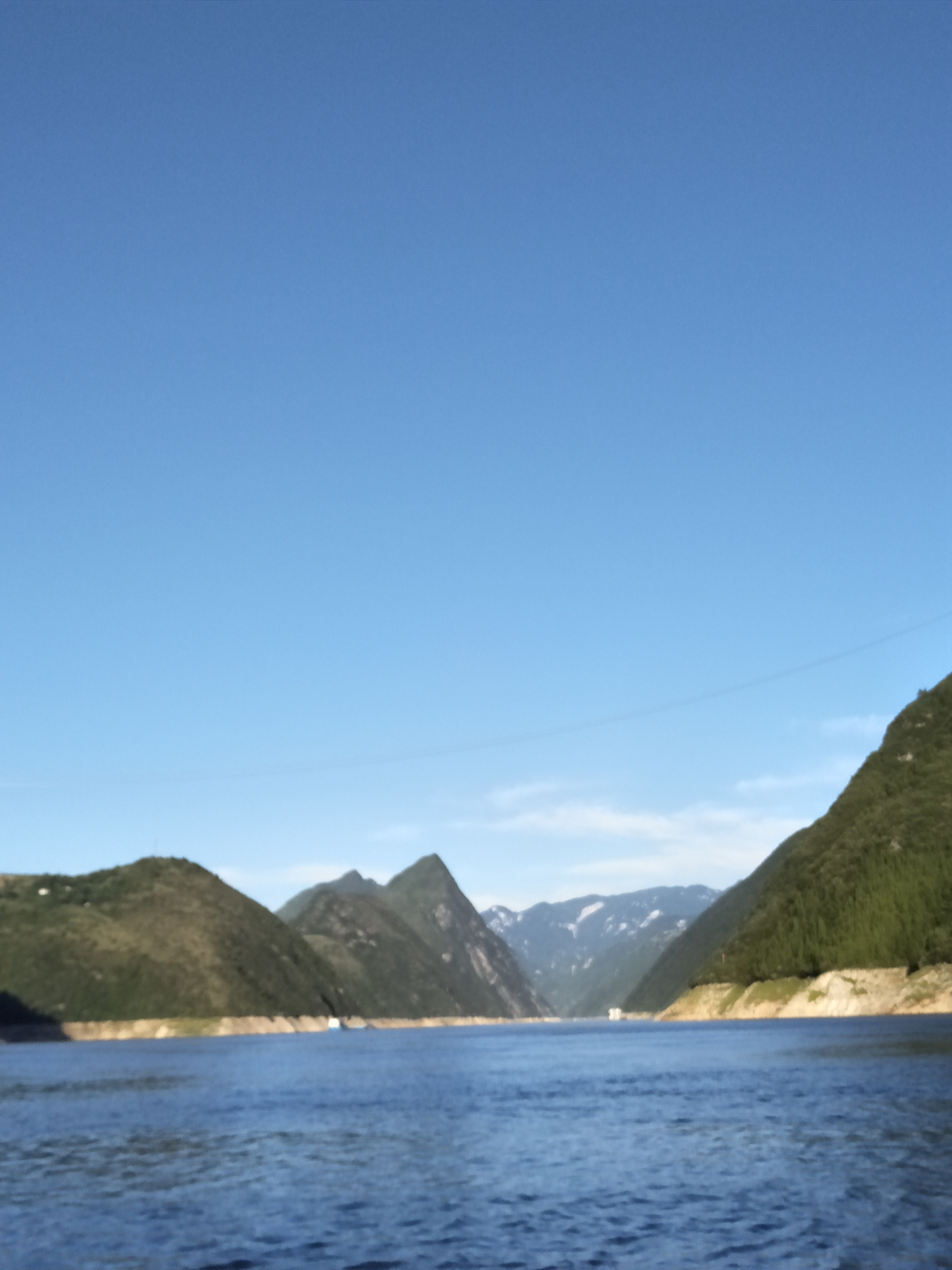
Yangtze River in Badong County

The Badong county seat, commonly referred to simply as "Badong", is in the town of Xinling (信陵镇; Xìnlíng Zhèn), located on the high southern banks of the Yangtze River channel. The Yangtze valley was flooded during the first decade of the 21st century after the construction of the Three Gorges Dam to the east, but Badong county seat was mostly above the flood line, and so more of the original town survives than is the case in many other river towns along this section of the Yangtze.

== Administrative divisions ==
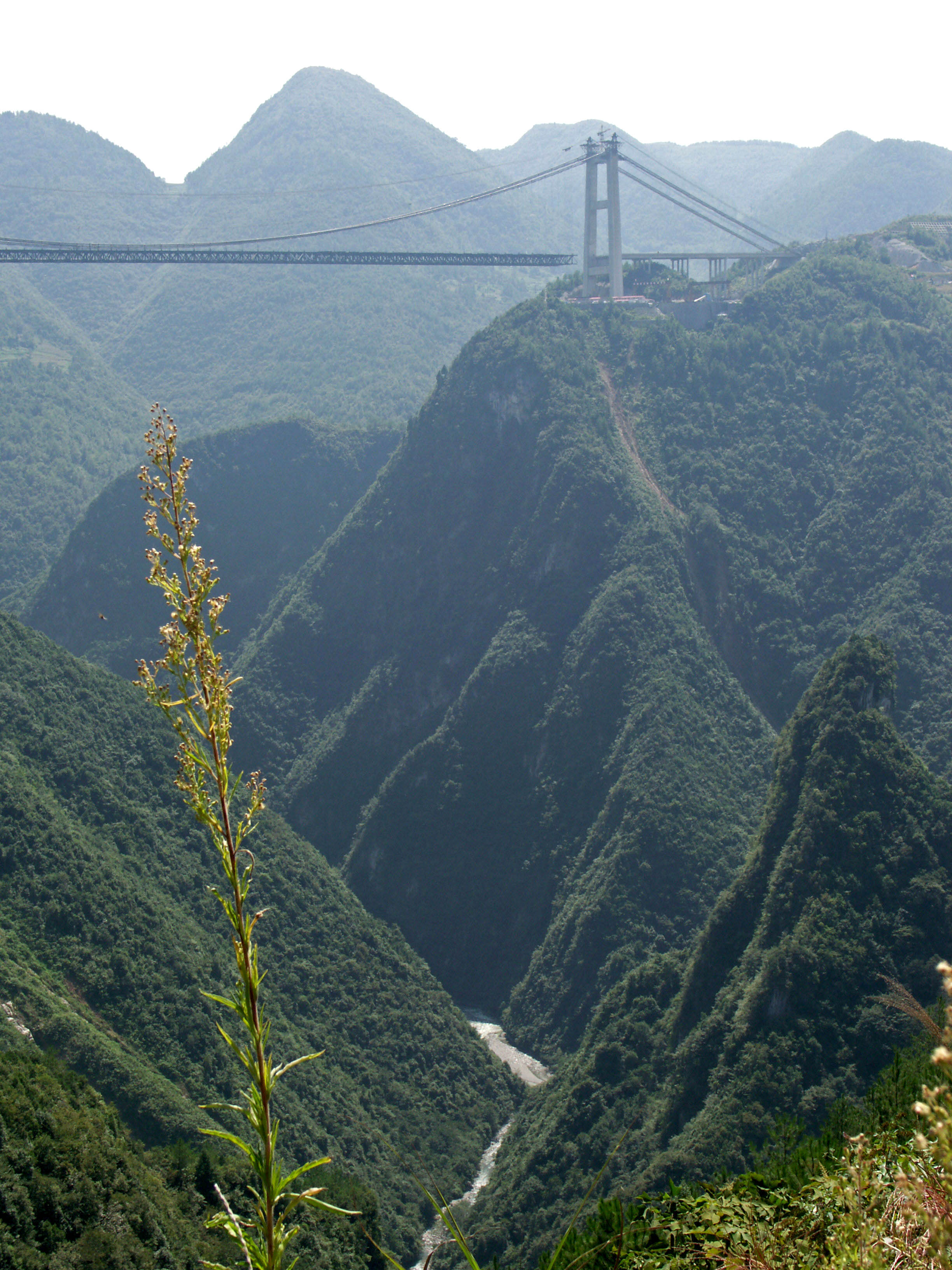
The Si Du River Bridge (Yesanguan Town), said to be the highest bridge in the world

Badong County is divided into 10 towns and 2 townships.

Ten towns:

- Xinling (信陵镇; Xìnlíng Zhèn)
- Dongrangkou (东瀼口镇; Dōngrǎngkǒu Zhèn)
- Yanduhe (沿渡河镇; Yándùhé Zhèn)
- Guandukou (官渡口镇; Guāndùkǒu Zhèn)
- Chadianzi (茶店子镇; Chádiànzǐ Zhèn)
- Lücongpo (绿葱坡镇; Lǜcōngpō Zhèn)
- Dazhiping (大支坪镇; Dàzhīpíng Zhèn)
- Yesanguan (野三关镇; Yěsānguān Zhèn)
- Qingtaiping (清太坪镇; Qīngtàipíng Zhèn)
- Shuibuya (水布垭镇; Shuǐbùyà Zhèn)

Two townships:

- Xiqiuwan (溪丘湾乡; Xīqiūwān Xiāng)
- Jinguoping (金果坪乡; Jīnguǒpíng Xiāng)

The main urban area of the county (i.e., the place typically labeled "Badong" on less-detailed maps) consists of Xinling Town—the seat of the county government—on the right (southern) bank of the Yangtze, and the smaller Dongrangkou and Guandukou towns on the opposite side of the river. They two sides of the Yangtze are connected by the Badong Bridge.

== Climate ==
Climate data for Badong, elevation 338 m (1,109 ft), (1991–2020 normals, extremes 1981–present)
Month	Jan	Feb	Mar	Apr	May	Jun	Jul	Aug	Sep	Oct	Nov	Dec	Year
Record high °C (°F)	19.5 (67.1)	27.4 (81.3)	34.0 (93.2)	37.1 (98.8)	38.5 (101.3)	40.8 (105.4)	42.9 (109.2)	42.8 (109.0)	40.9 (105.6)	33.7 (92.7)	27.1 (80.8)	20.3 (68.5)	42.9 (109.2)
Mean daily maximum °C (°F)	10.0 (50.0)	12.7 (54.9)	17.9 (64.2)	23.8 (74.8)	27.3 (81.1)	30.6 (87.1)	33.3 (91.9)	33.4 (92.1)	28.5 (83.3)	22.6 (72.7)	17.3 (63.1)	11.7 (53.1)	22.4 (72.4)
Daily mean °C (°F)	6.3 (43.3)	8.4 (47.1)	12.6 (54.7)	17.9 (64.2)	21.7 (71.1)	25.1 (77.2)	27.6 (81.7)	27.5 (81.5)	23.4 (74.1)	18.0 (64.4)	13.0 (55.4)	8.1 (46.6)	17.5 (63.4)
Mean daily minimum °C (°F)	3.7 (38.7)	5.4 (41.7)	8.7 (47.7)	13.5 (56.3)	17.6 (63.7)	21.2 (70.2)	23.7 (74.7)	23.4 (74.1)	19.8 (67.6)	14.9 (58.8)	10.1 (50.2)	5.5 (41.9)	14.0 (57.1)
Record low °C (°F)	−3.6 (25.5)	−1.6 (29.1)	−0.1 (31.8)	1.1 (34.0)	10.0 (50.0)	14.9 (58.8)	17.1 (62.8)	16.9 (62.4)	12.4 (54.3)	6.0 (42.8)	1.1 (34.0)	−5.9 (21.4)	−5.9 (21.4)
Average precipitation mm (inches)	17.6 (0.69)	31.0 (1.22)	53.8 (2.12)	100.2 (3.94)	141.0 (5.55)	153.3 (6.04)	171.0 (6.73)	137.4 (5.41)	113.5 (4.47)	93.7 (3.69)	51.2 (2.02)	15.3 (0.60)	1,079 (42.48)
Average precipitation days (≥ 0.1 mm)	7.1	7.7	10.4	12.6	14.3	13.0	13.9	11.6	11.1	11.5	9.4	7.2	129.8
Average snowy days	2.7	1.6	0.8	0	0	0	0	0	0	0	0	0.7	5.8
Average relative humidity (%)	69	67	67	69	73	75	76	72	73	76	75	71	72
Mean monthly sunshine hours	69.5	73.1	111.7	137.5	139.3	143.2	182.8	197.1	129.3	101.3	85.8	71.1	1,441.7
Percentage possible sunshine	22	23	30	35	33	34	43	48	35	29	27	23	32
Source: China Meteorological Administration all-time extreme temperature

== Economy ==
Coal mining in small pits is the main commercial activity in the region, along with farming. There is also a large cement factory on the river to the east of the town, which is a significant polluter.

The rural population of Badong County, as with many other parts of inland China, has seen major changes in the past two decades. The Chinese government's population control policies in the 1980s and beyond resulted in a sharp drop in births, and also in a change in attitudes, making many couples uninterested in having more than one child. The new freedom to travel and work in other parts of China has also led to a major exodus of workers to the coastal areas of China to find work. The older people tend to stay in the villages, and the workers often return to have their children, but they then generally return to the factories. The overall result is that many villages in Badong are shrinking and some terraced farmland in this largely mountaintainous region is being abandoned and allowed to return to its original state.

== Transportation ==
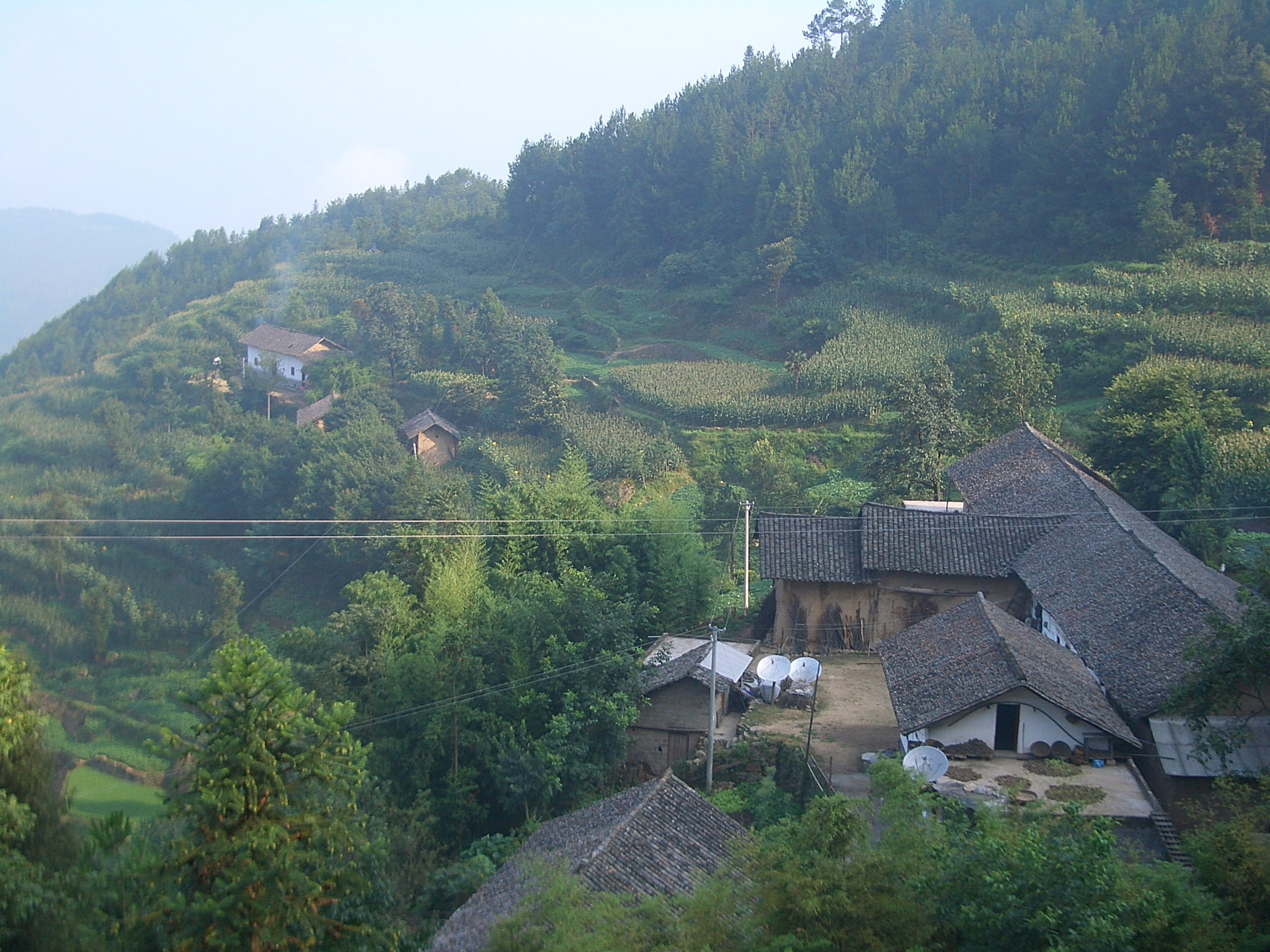
Rural landscape near G209 in Xiqiuwan Township, Badong County

Due to the difficult terrain and the road conditions, the most convenient way to reach Badong's county seat is with a Yangtze riverboat. Both regular boats and hydrofoils call in the busy Badong harbor on the way up and down between Yichang and Chongqing.

The county has one Yangtze crossing, the Badong Bridge, carrying China National Highway 209. The highway crosses the northern half of the county from the northeast to the southwest. As of 2009, Highway 209 was little more than a dirt road for a 20-km stretch north of the bridge.

China National Highway 318 crosses the southern part of the county from the east to the west. The new G50 Shanghai–Chongqing Expressway and Yichang-Wanzhou Railway have been recently completed along the same corridor as well. The Siduhe Bridge on the new highway, located near Yesanguan town, is one of the longest bridges of its kinds; the nearby Zhijinghe Bridge is one of the world's tallest arch bridges.

The Yesanguan railway station, located near Yesanguan Town in the south-central part of the county, is the only railway station within the county. It renamed from Badong railway station to Yesanguan railway station in 2022. A high-speed rail station, Badong North railway station (now renamed Badong railway station), will open on the Zhengzhou–Wanzhou high-speed railway.

A number of provincial highways run north to south through the county.

== See also ==
- Deng Yujiao incident; occurred in Badong in 2009

== Gallery ==
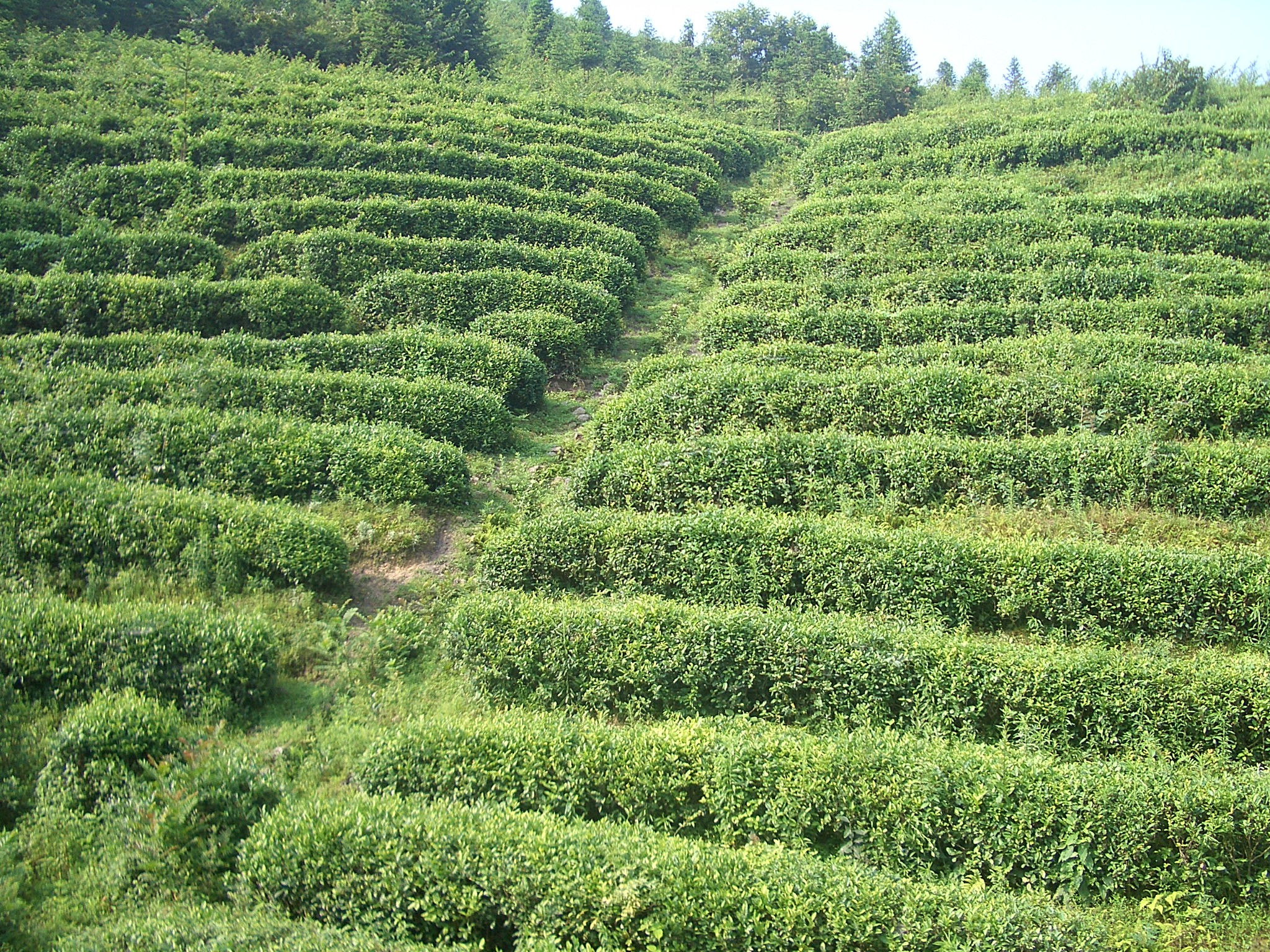
Jingu Tea Co's tea plantation in Xiqiuwan Township

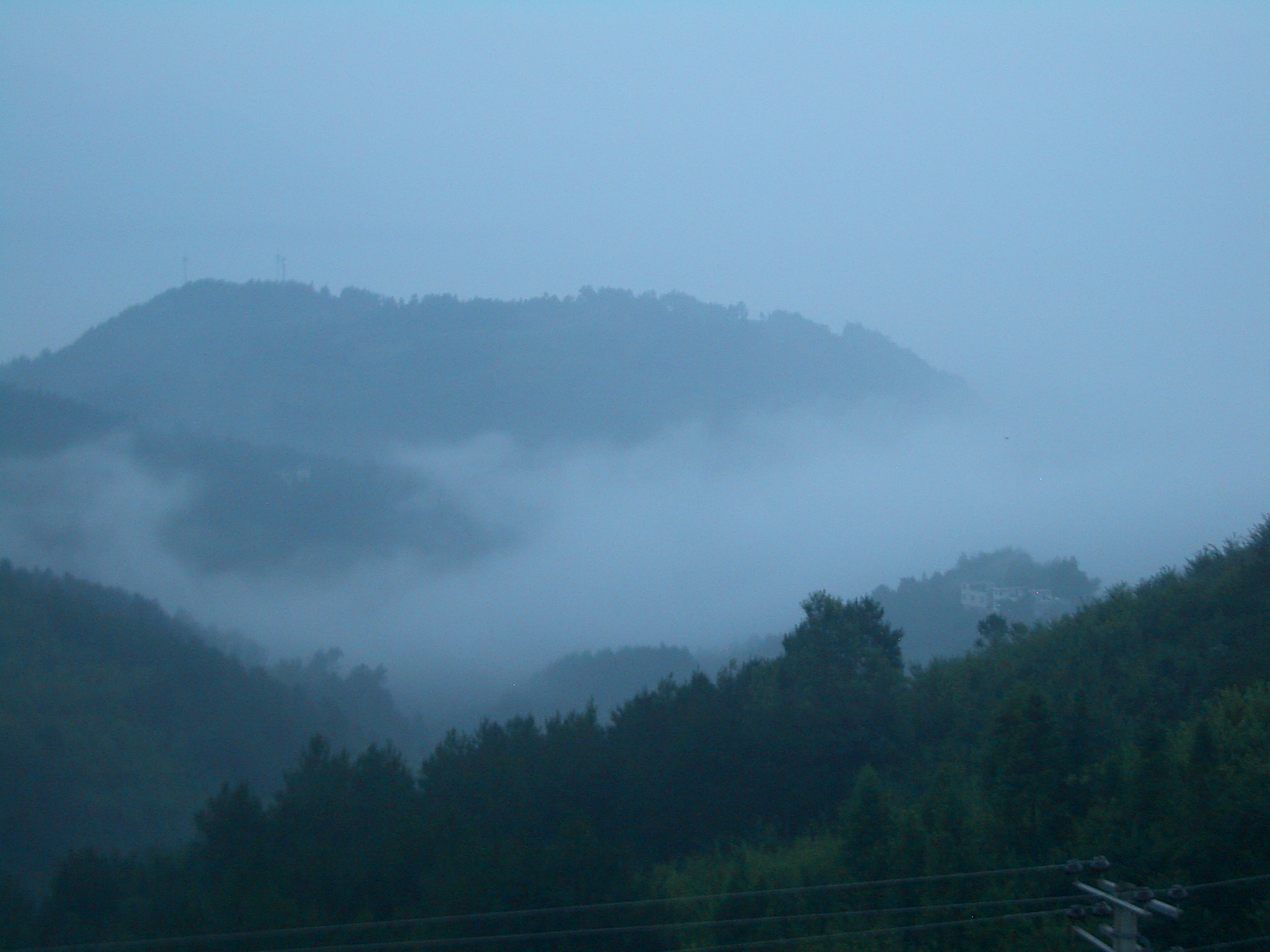
Morning in Xiqiuwan Township

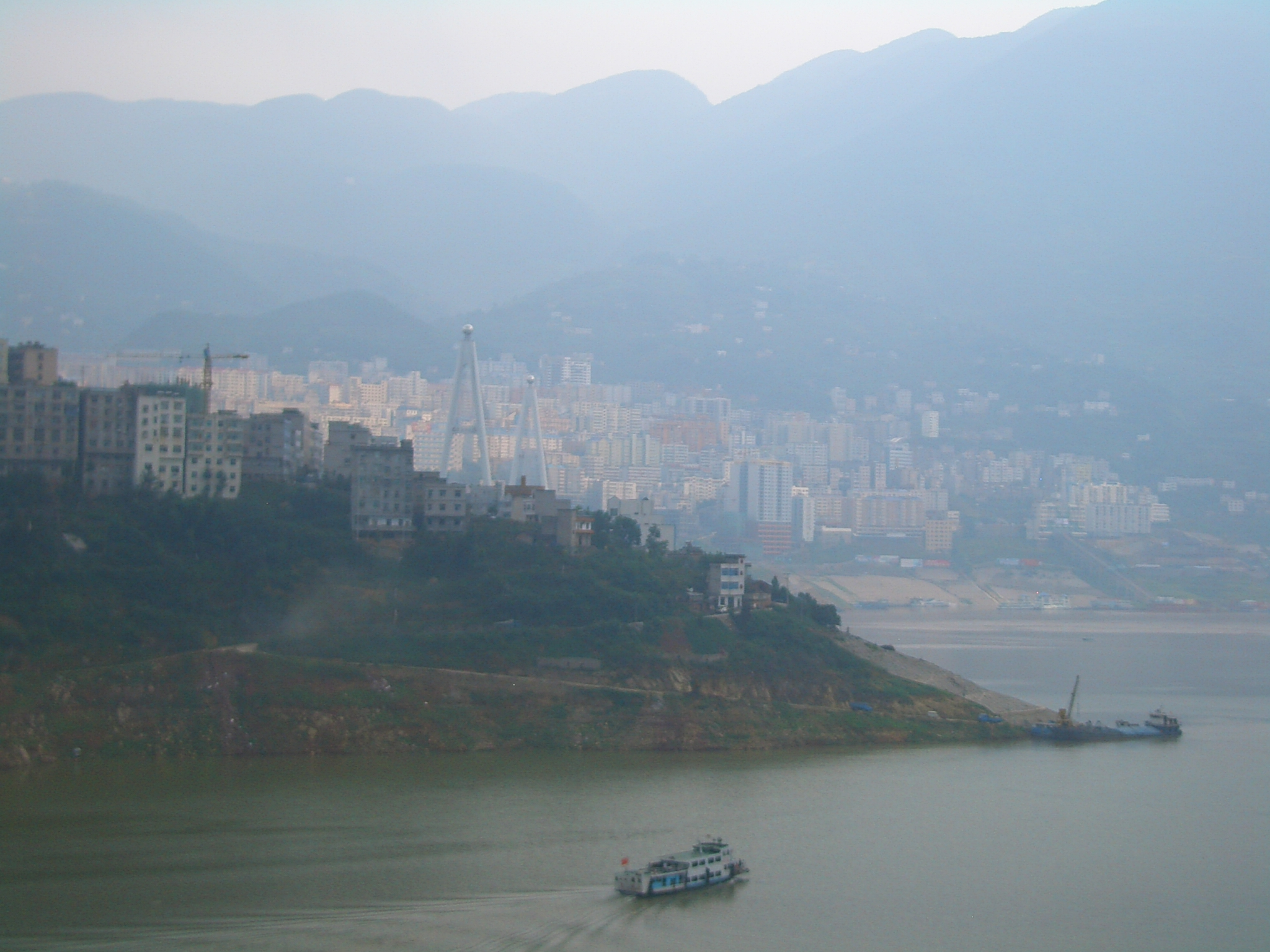
The fall of the Shennong Stream (in front) into the Yangtze

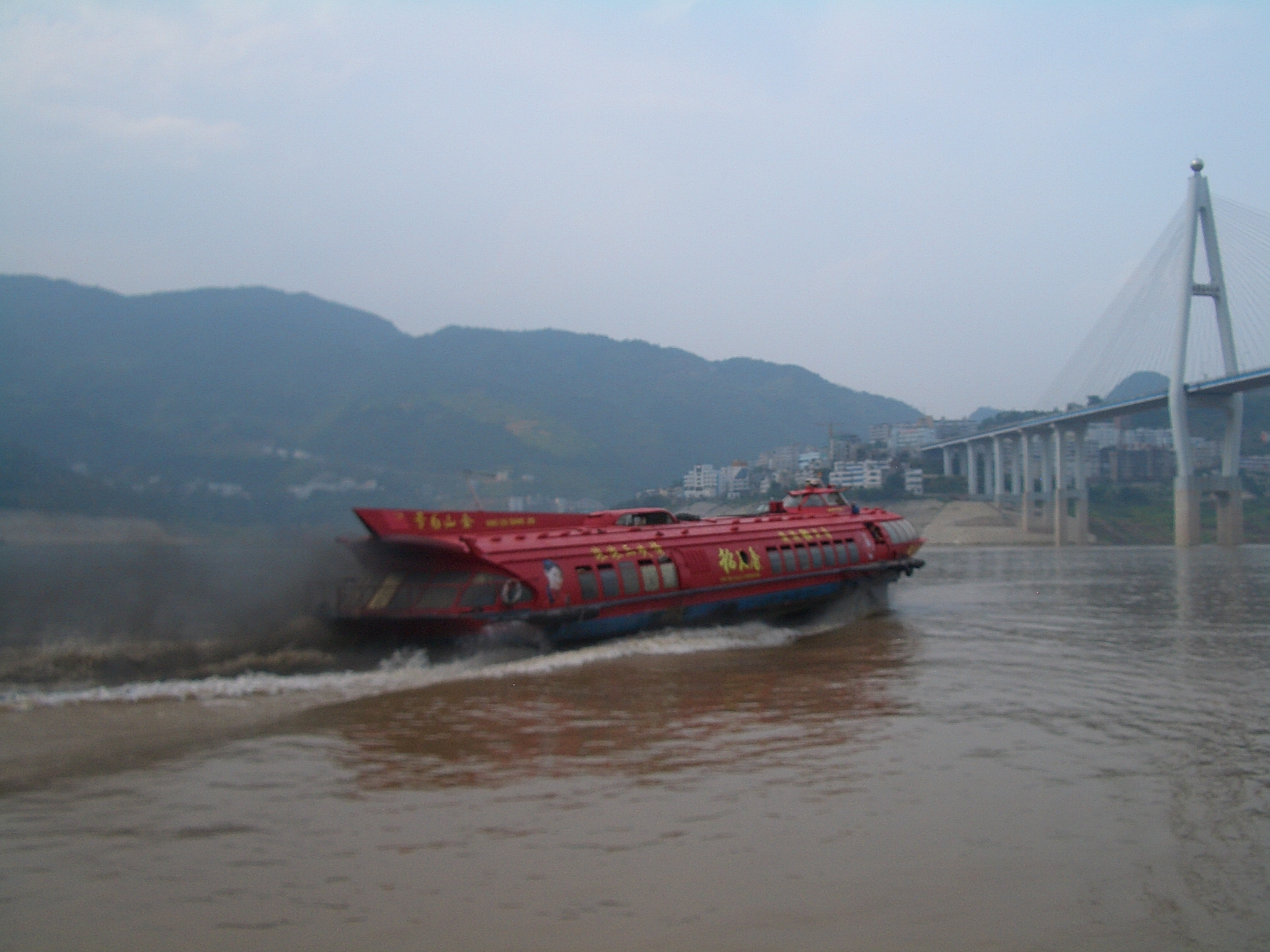
A hydrofoil boat leaving the Badong Port

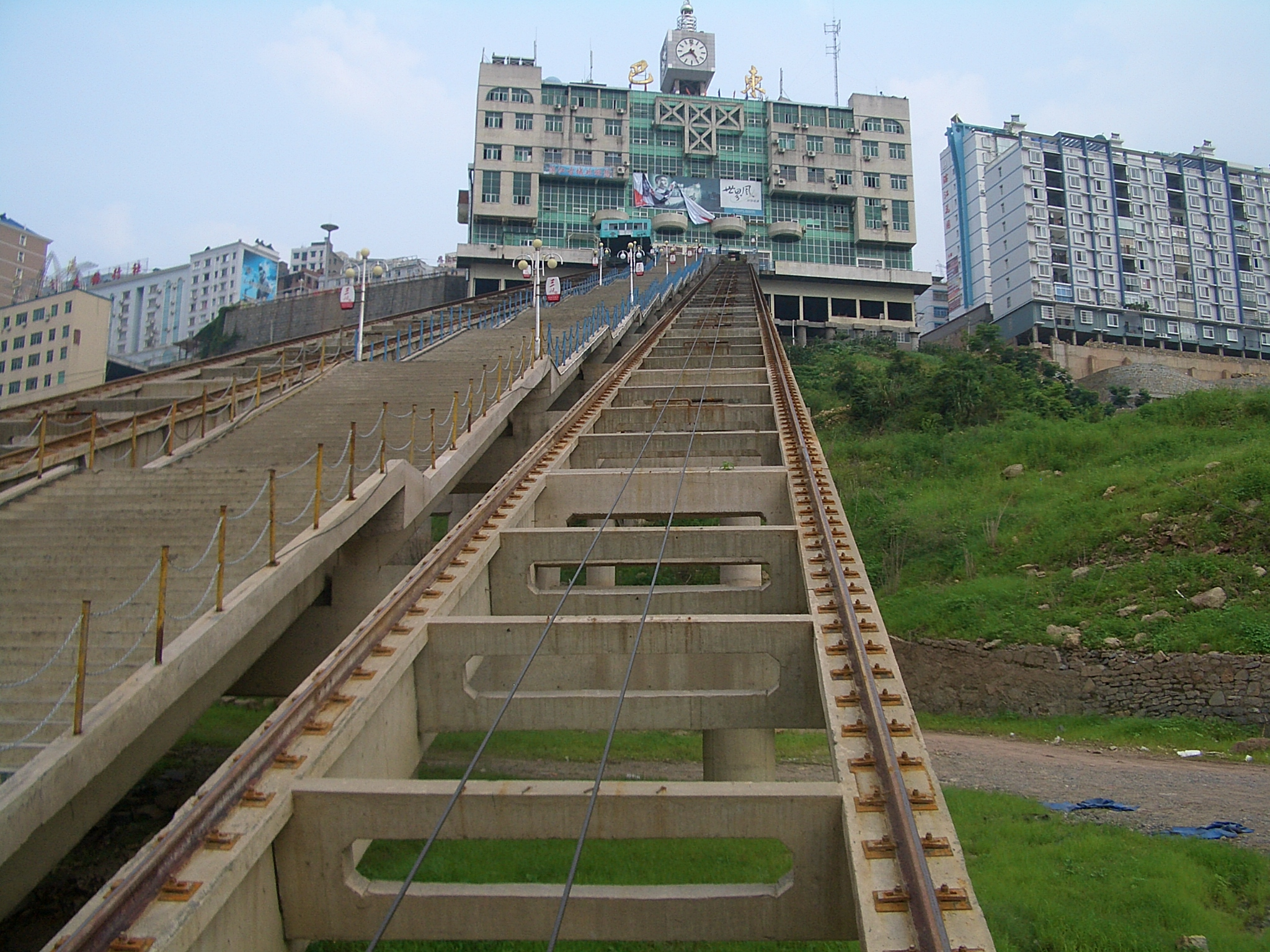
The passenger terminal in the Badong Port, with the funicular system

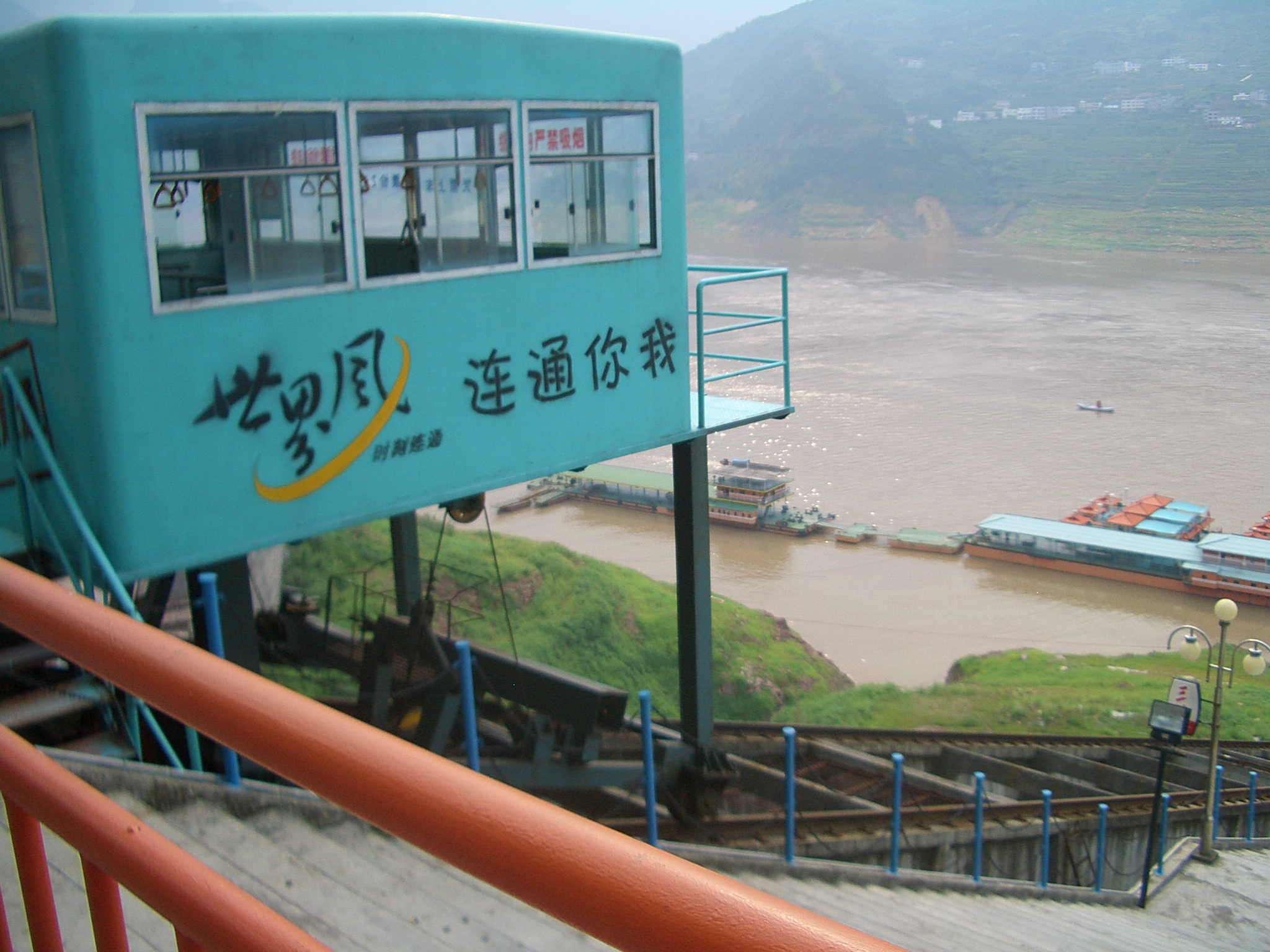
Badong Port passenger funicular

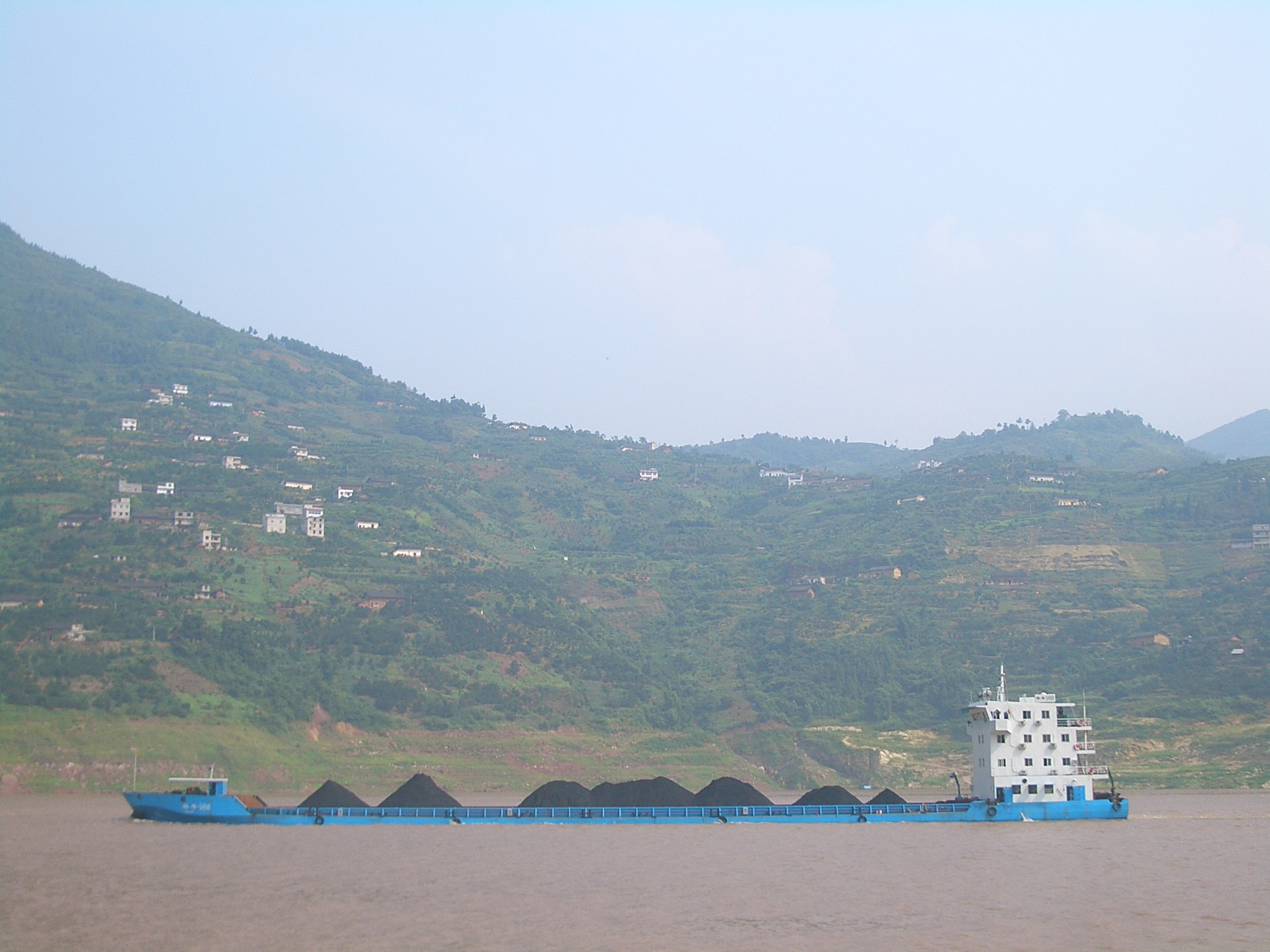
A coal barge on the Yangtze

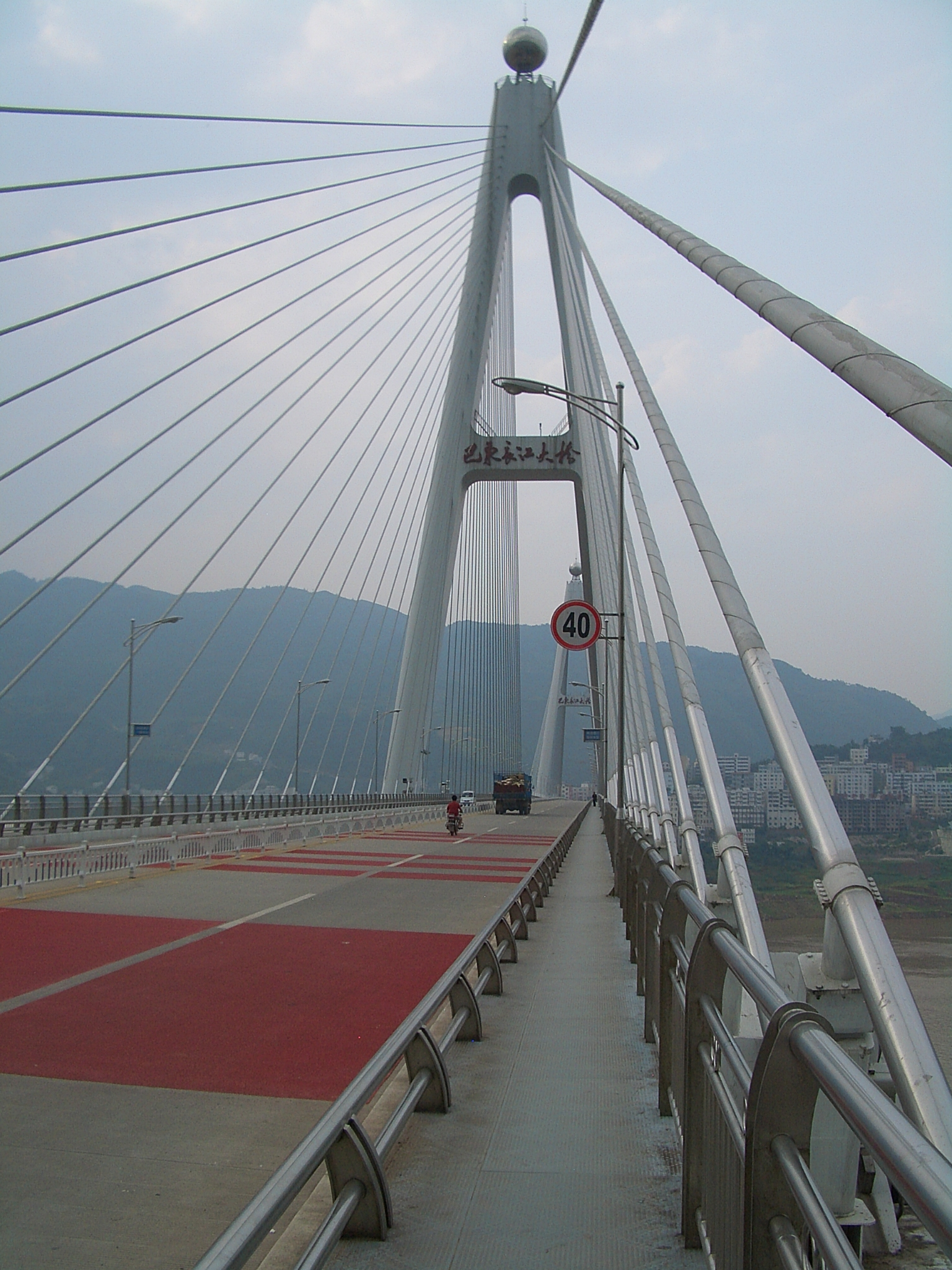
On the Badong Bridge, which carries G209 across the Yangtze

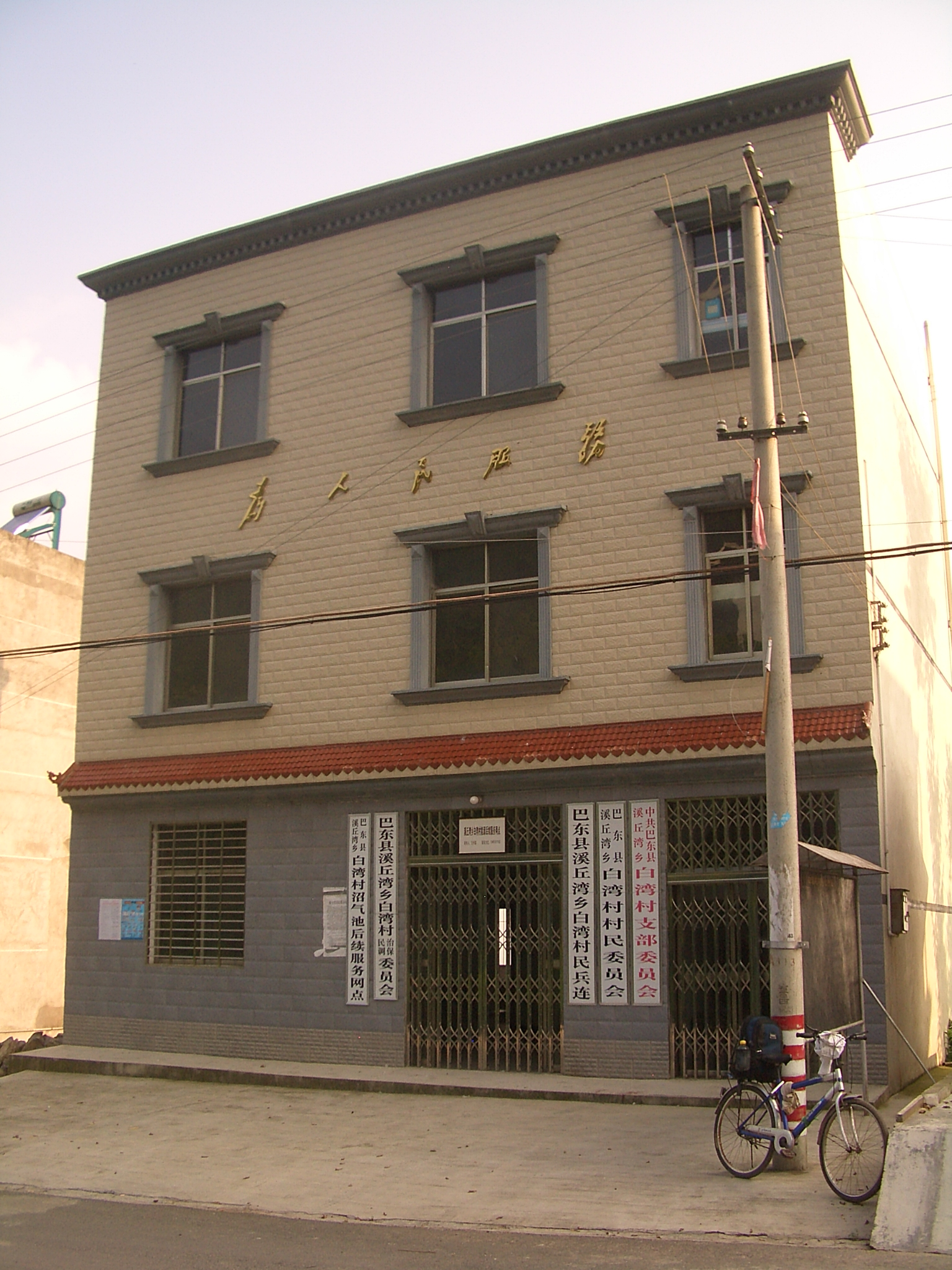
Government offices of Baishawan village, in Xiqiuwan Township
