= Badong Yangtze River Bridge =

Badong Yangtze River Bridge 巴东长江大桥
- Coordinates: 31°02′55″N 110°19′42″E
- Carries: China National Highway 209
- Crosses: Yangtze River
- Locale: Badong County, Hubei, China

Characteristics
- Design: Cable-stayed
- Total length: 908 metres (2,979 ft)
- Height: 218 metres (715 ft)
- Longest span: 388 metres (1,273 ft)
- Clearance above: 147 metres (482 ft)

History
- Construction start: 1999
- Construction end: 2001
- Opened: 1 July 2004

Location
- Interactive map of Badong Yangtze River Bridge

The Badong Yangtze River Bridge is a cable-stayed bridge over the Yangtze River in Badong County, Hubei, China. Completed in July 2004, it carries 4 lanes of traffic on China National Highway 209. The bridge's highest tower measures 218 metres (715 ft) and the bridge has a main span of 388 metres (1,273 ft). The bridge was constructed 147 metres (482 ft) above the original river however the reservoir created by the Three Gorges Dam has increased the height of the water below the bridge and the clearance is vastly reduced.

== See also ==
- Bridges and tunnels across the Yangtze River
- List of bridges in China
- List of tallest bridges
