= Shennong Stream =

River in Hubei Province, China

Coordinates: 31.0481°N 110.3228°E

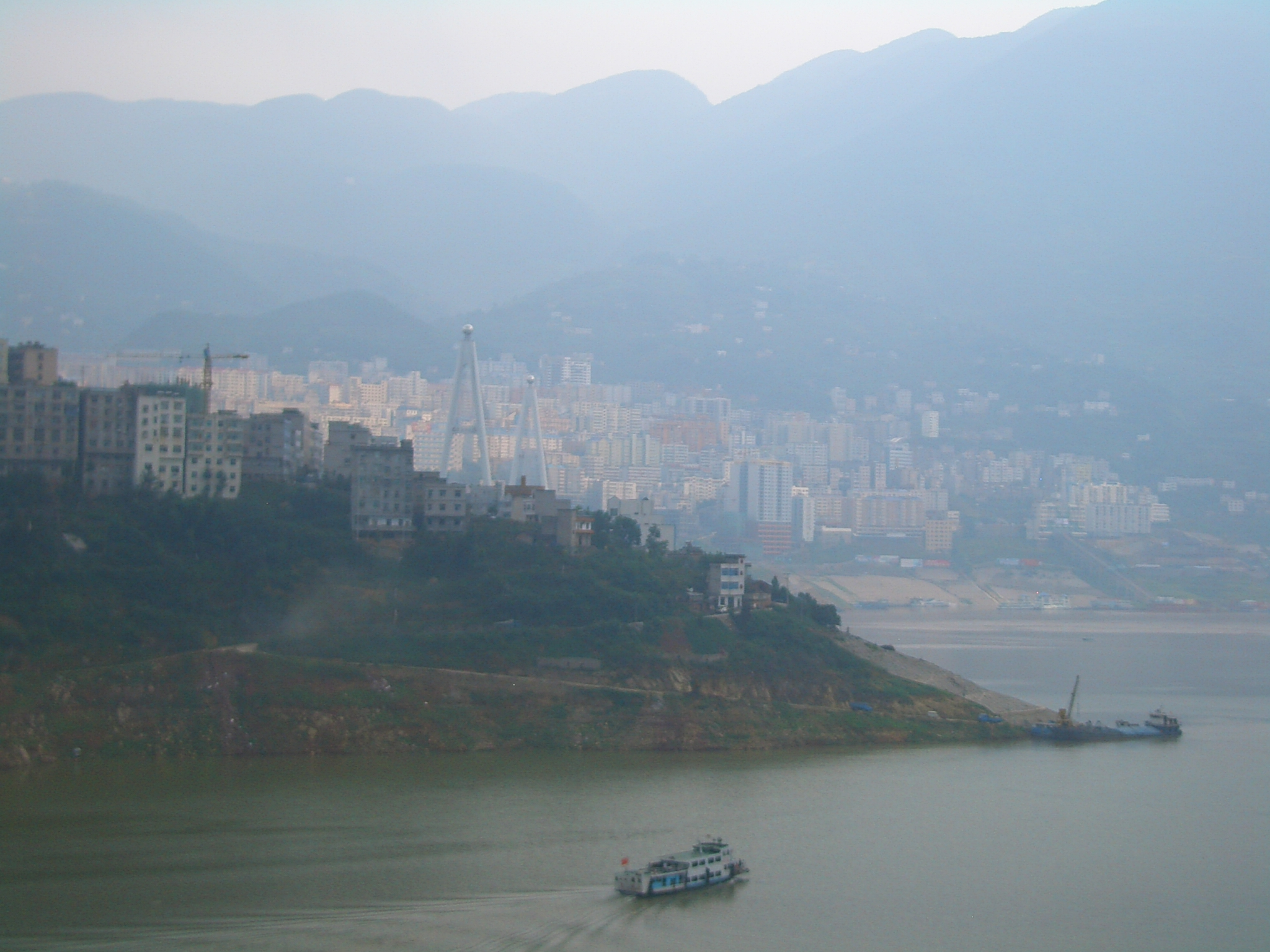
- The confluence of the Shennong Stream (foreground) with the Yangtze (background). The city of Badong is on the far side of the Yangtze

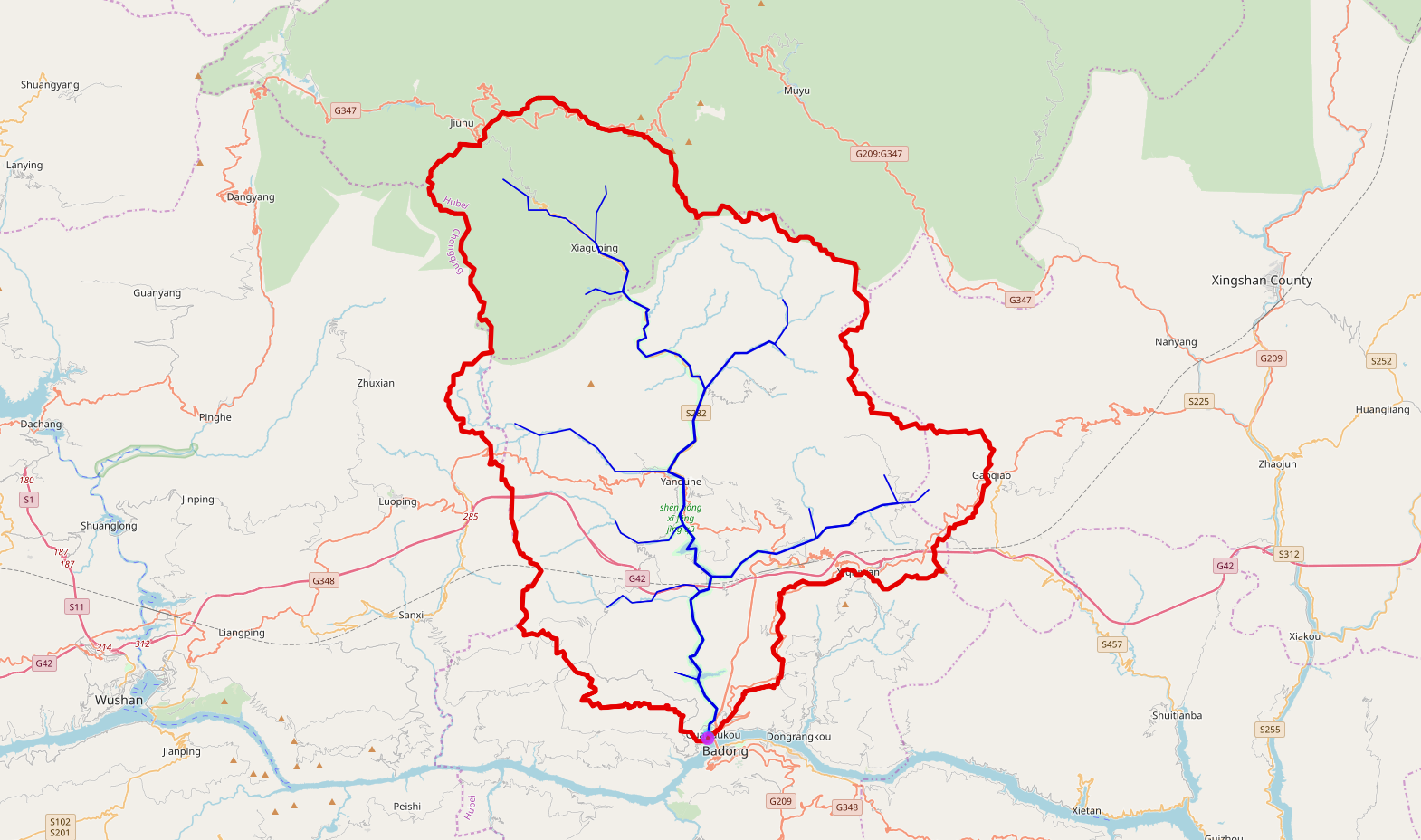

- Location of Shennong Stream in Hubei Location of Shennong Stream in Hubei (China)
- Native name: 神农溪 (Chinese); Shénnóng Xī (Chinese)

Location
- Country: China
- Province: Hubei

Shennong Stream (Chinese: 神农溪; pinyin: Shénnóng Xī) is a left tributary of the Yangtze River, located in the Hubei Province of central China. Fed by tributaries some of which come from the Shennongjia Forestry District, the stream flows south, falling into the Yangtze opposite the County of Badong.

Originally the Shennong Stream watercourse consisted of a wild river traversing a tortuous alignment flanked by almost vertical limestone cliffs; however, since the beginning of the construction of the Three Gorges Dam downstream on the Yangtze, the water level has risen approximately 155 metres at the mouth of Shennong Stream (Jin, 2006). The lower reaches of the Shennong Stream are presently a torpidly flowing river, most of whose previously scenic vertical gorge is now submerged. By the completion of the dam construction in 2009, a further 20 metres of gorge will be inundated.

Measuring a length of 60 kilometers, the Shennong Stream flows through three gorges with different charming scenery. The three gorges are Mianzhu Gorge, Parrot Gorge and Longcangdong Gorge.

== History ==
The banks of the Shennong Stream have been inhabited since at least the Han dynasty; the primary ethnic group of the river valley has been the Tujia people. Early history of settlement in the Shennong Stream Gorge is evinced by the hanging coffins stowed in clefts on the high vertical limestone clefts; it is a puzzle to modern man as to how the heavy coffins were stowed on such steep, ostensibly inaccessible places. The coffins themselves were typically carved from a single layer section of a tree trunk, which was approximately 90 cm in diameter; although the lid section was split off to be separate. Some of these coffins can be seen presently from canoes traveling along the Shennong Stream. The coffins are typically 30 to 150 metres from the bluff top above and 25 to 70 meters above the river surface. Most commonly a coffin rests on two sturdy hewn poles that have been wedged within limestone cleft or cave to form generally level platform. Many of these coffins have been lost or destroyed due to the Three Gorges Dam construction, which has led to inundation of many of these river reaches; some coffins, however, have been retrieved for cultural presentation and archeological study. For example, one such coffin was retrieved about 10 km west along the Yangtze River mainstem and is preserved on display at Baidicheng, within an historical Daoist Temple situated high above the inundation level along the Yangtze.

The Shennong Stream Valley is also the site of a number of historical battles in Chinese history. In the battle of Xiaoting, Liu Bei, an emperor during the Three Kingdoms period, incinerated the fleet of Lu Xun, commander of the Eastern Wu forces, effectively cutting off the pursuit of the latter general. This naval battle took place in the lower reaches of the Shennong Stream in the Longchang Gorge at the Rang Kou Xi tributary.(Chao, 2005)

The Parrot Gully within Yingwu Gorge along the Shennong Stream exhibits numerous large horizontal incisions carved high on the limestone, which are vestiges of an earlier aerial plank road; moreover, this trace of earlier civilization may be a clue as to how the coffin sites were accessed via an intricate network of aerial planks. At Parrot Gully, Liu Chunjun, a general of the Taiping Heavenly Kingdom, fought a number of battles.

== Hydrology ==
The stream depth is over 155 metres at the mouth of the Shennong Stream, while 15 km upstream the depth diminishes to its original state uninfluenced by the Three Gorges Dam, i.e. approximately 30 cm in depth over riffles armoured with small rounded stones. Turbidity characteristics of the upper Shennong Stream are favourable with respect to most Chinese rivers, with Secchi disk measurements clear to at least 30 cm in depth;. The pH of the upper (natural) stream is in the range of 8.5 or slightly alkaline. (Lumina, 2007)

== See also ==
- Flood control
- Interment
