= Geheyan Dam =

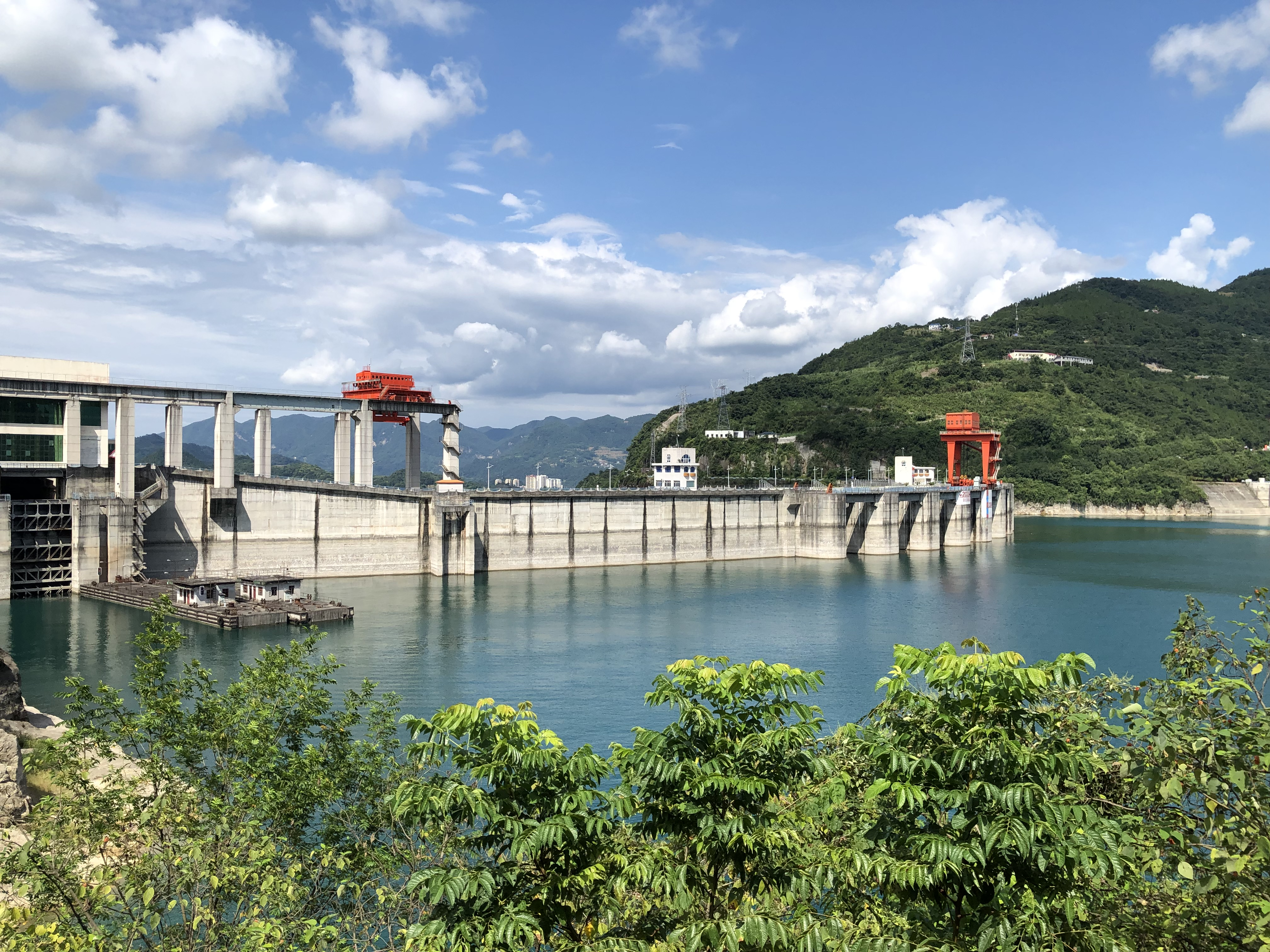
- Interactive map of Geheyan Dam
- Official name: 清江隔河岩水利枢纽工程
- Location: Changyang Tujia Autonomous County, Hubei, China
- Coordinates: 30°28′03″N 111°8′18″E
- Construction began: 1987
- Opening date: 1993
- Construction cost: ¥5 billion

Dam and spillways
- Type of dam: Arch-gravity dam
- Impounds: Qingjiang River
- Height: 157 m (515 ft)

Reservoir
- Total capacity: 3,400,000,000 m^{3} (2,756,425 acre⋅ft)

Power Station
- Operator: HQHDC
- Turbines: 4 × 310MW
- Installed capacity: 1,240 MW

The Geheyan Dam (simplified Chinese: 隔河岩大坝; traditional Chinese: 隔河岩大壩; pinyin: Géhéyán Dàbà) is an arch-gravity dam on the Qingjiang River, a tributary of the Yangtze River, in Hubei, China.

The dam is located in Changyang Tujia Autonomous County (which is part of the prefecture-level city of Yichang), just a few kilometers to the west (upstream) from the county seat, Longzhouping Town (龙舟坪镇).

The dam was designed in 1987, and is equipped with a ship lift capable of lifting vessels of 300,000 kg (660,000 lb) displacement. The dam played an important role in helping to ameliorate the impact of the 1998 Yangtze Floods.

Power is generated by four units rated at 310 MW each, totalling the installed capacity at 1,240 MW.

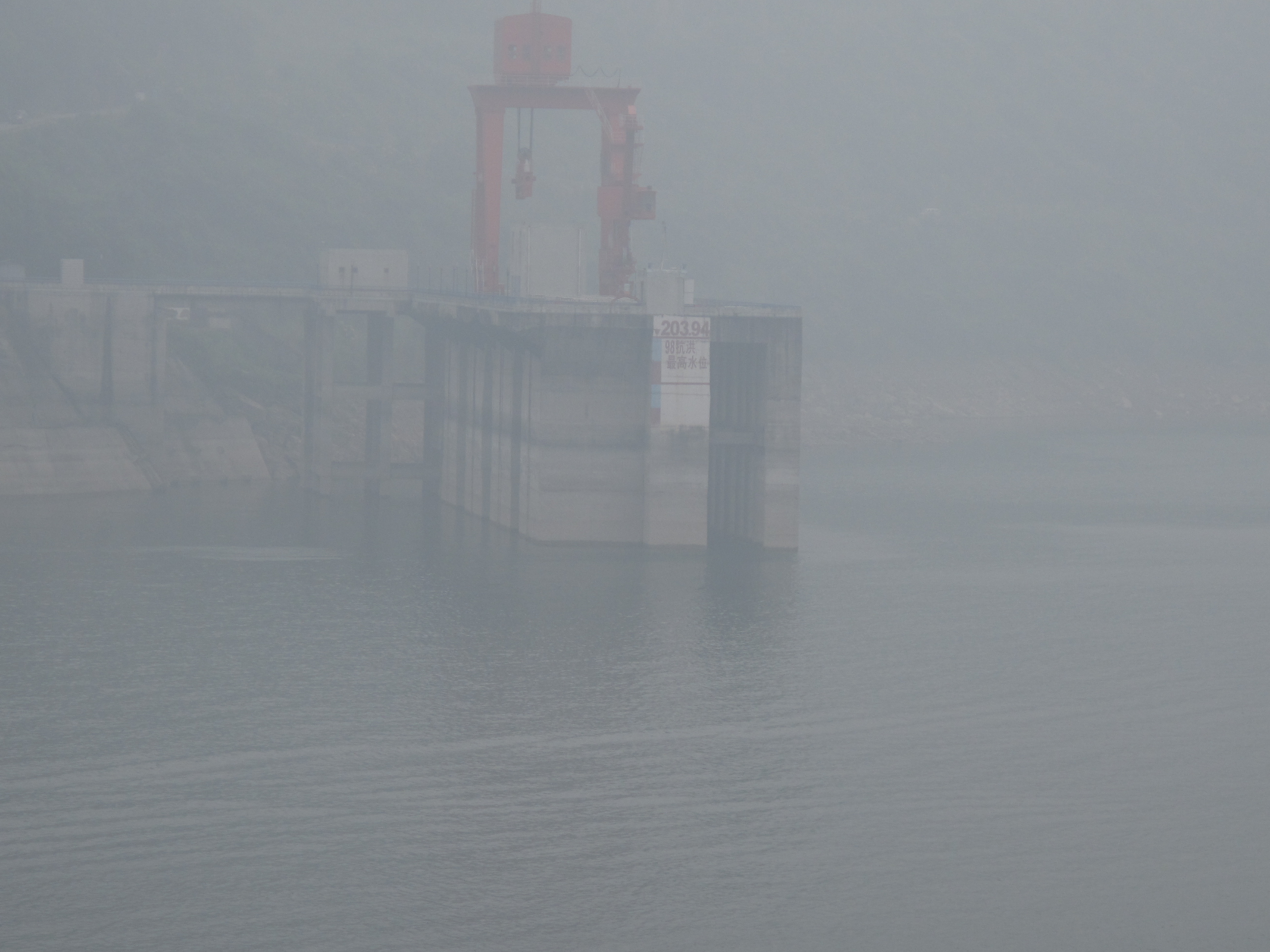
1998 Yangtze River floods Qing River Geheyan Dam Highest Water Level, 203.94 m, Geheyan Dam crest elevation is 206 m.

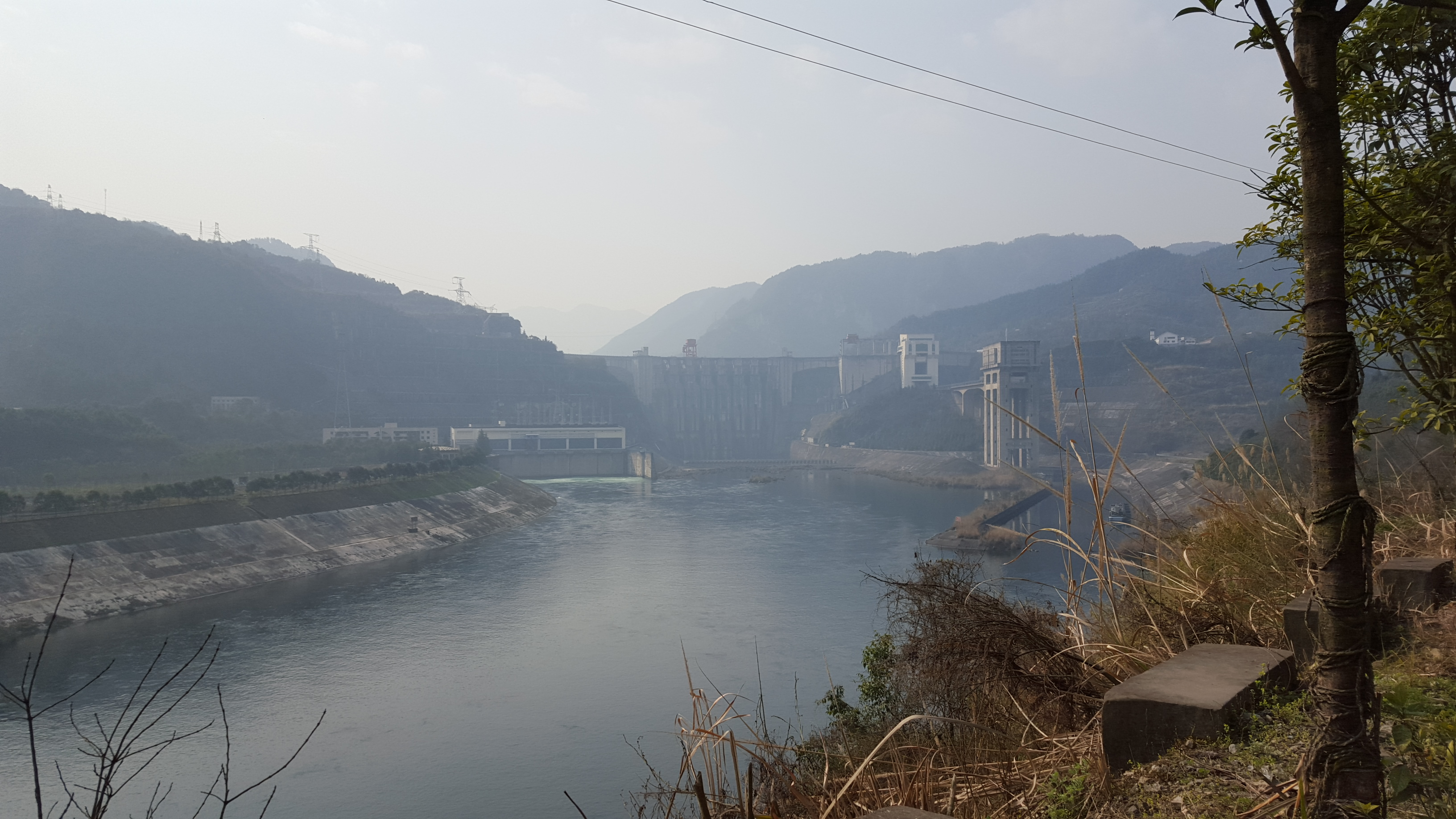

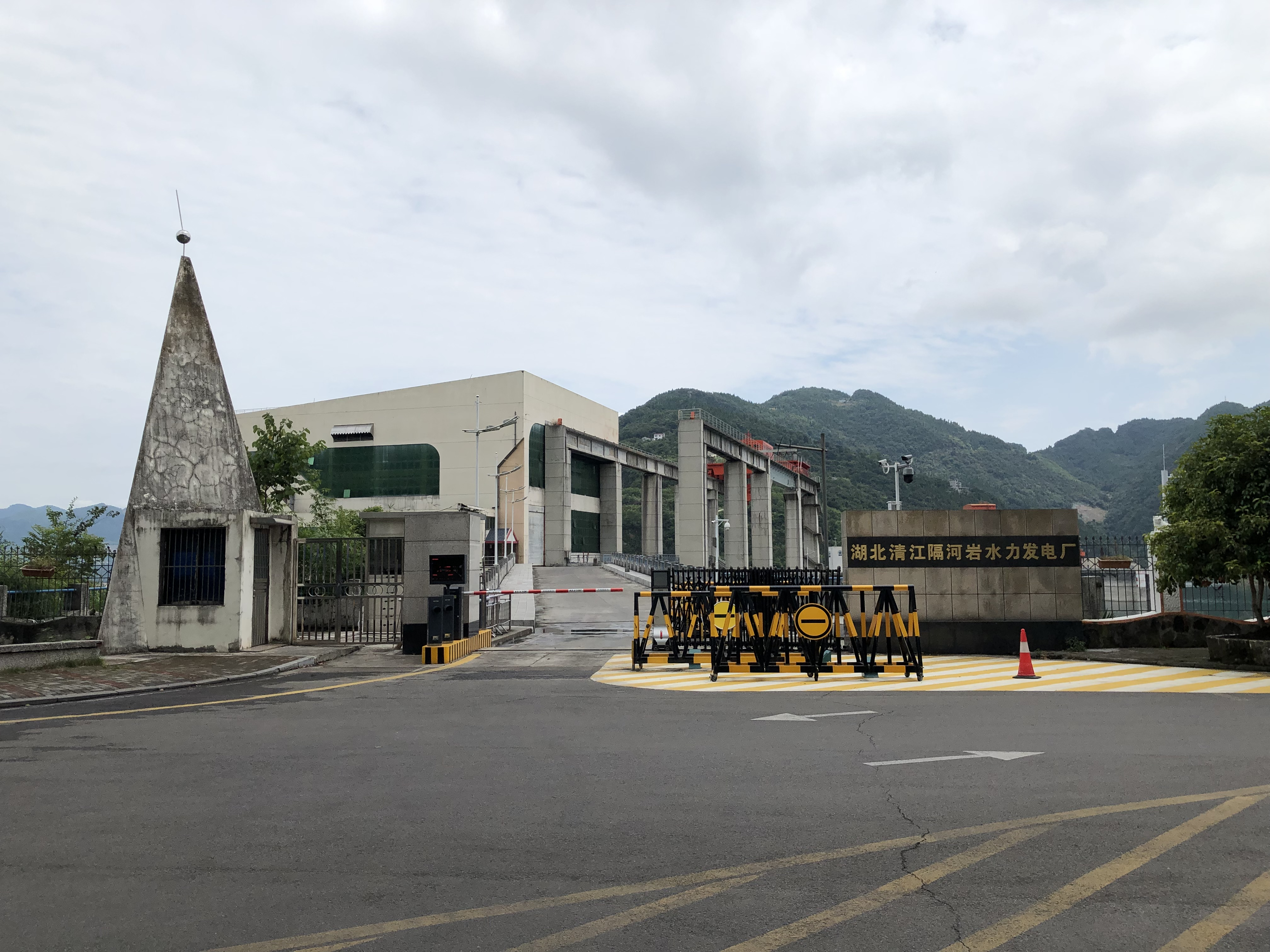

== See also ==
- List of power stations in China
- Ship lifts in China
