= Changyang Tujia Autonomous County =

Changyang County 长阳县
- County
- 长阳土家族自治县; Changyang Tujia Autonomous County
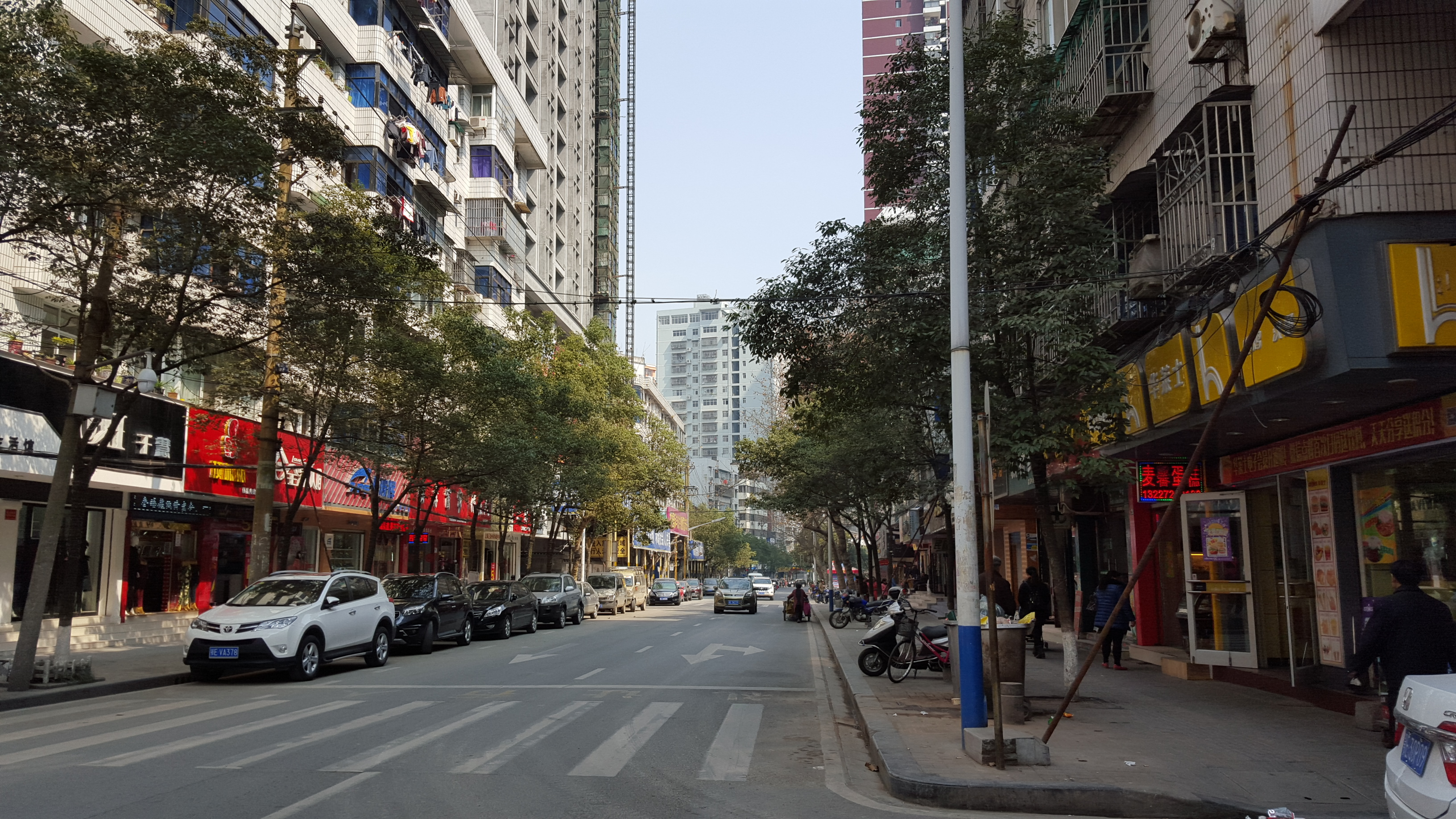
- Longzhou Boulevard

- Location in Hubei
- Coordinates: 30°28′N 110°52′E
- Country: People's Republic of China
- Province: Hubei
- Prefecture-level city: Yichang

Area
  - Total: 3,430 km^{2} (1,320 sq mi)

Population (2020)
  - Total: 305,740
  - Density: 89.1/km^{2} (231/sq mi)
- Time zone: UTC+8 (China Standard)
- Website: changyang.gov.cn

Changyang Tujia Autonomous County (simplified Chinese: 长阳土家族自治县; traditional Chinese: 長陽土家族自治縣; pinyin: Chángyáng Tǔjiāzú Zìzhìxiàn) or in Tujia language known as Changryangf Bifzivkar Zivzirxianf is an autonomous county in western Hubei province, People's Republic of China. It is under the administration of the prefecture-level city of Yichang.

The county is located in the basin of the Qing River, a right tributary of the Yangtze. The river is flanked by mountains on both sides, the tallest of which - the Tianzhu Mountain - is 2,542 metres (8,340 ft) tall. The river is dammed by the Geheyan Dam (located within the county) and the Gaoba Dam (located in the neighboring Yidu County-level City, but flooding some of the Qingjiang River valley within Changyang County as well). The resulting reservoirs provide the main water transportation route throughout much of the county.

Established in 1984 with a surface area of 3,412 square kilometres (1,317 sq mi) and a population in 1984 of 399,000 inhabitants, of which 295,000 were Tujia.

== Administrative divisions ==
Eight towns:

- Longzhouping (龙舟坪镇), Gaojiayan (高家堰镇), Moshi (磨市镇), Duzhenwan (都镇湾镇), Ziqiu (资丘镇), Yuxiakou (渔峡口镇), Langping (榔坪镇), Hejiaping (贺家坪镇)

Three townships:

- Dayan Township (大堰乡), Yazikou Township (鸭子口乡), Huoshaoping Township (火烧坪乡)

== Climate ==
Climate data for Changyang, elevation 178 m (584 ft), (1991–2020 normals, extremes 1981–present)
Month	Jan	Feb	Mar	Apr	May	Jun	Jul	Aug	Sep	Oct	Nov	Dec	Year
Record high °C (°F)	23.1 (73.6)	29.0 (84.2)	35.1 (95.2)	37.9 (100.2)	39.8 (103.6)	40.1 (104.2)	40.8 (105.4)	41.1 (106.0)	39.9 (103.8)	35.0 (95.0)	28.8 (83.8)	25.1 (77.2)	41.1 (106.0)
Mean daily maximum °C (°F)	8.8 (47.8)	11.6 (52.9)	16.7 (62.1)	22.9 (73.2)	26.9 (80.4)	30.0 (86.0)	32.5 (90.5)	32.2 (90.0)	27.9 (82.2)	22.6 (72.7)	16.8 (62.2)	11.3 (52.3)	21.7 (71.0)
Daily mean °C (°F)	5.0 (41.0)	7.3 (45.1)	11.6 (52.9)	17.1 (62.8)	21.4 (70.5)	24.9 (76.8)	27.4 (81.3)	26.9 (80.4)	22.8 (73.0)	17.6 (63.7)	12.2 (54.0)	7.1 (44.8)	16.8 (62.2)
Mean daily minimum °C (°F)	2.2 (36.0)	4.2 (39.6)	7.9 (46.2)	13.0 (55.4)	17.4 (63.3)	21.3 (70.3)	23.8 (74.8)	23.4 (74.1)	19.5 (67.1)	14.4 (57.9)	9.2 (48.6)	4.2 (39.6)	13.4 (56.1)
Record low °C (°F)	−4.9 (23.2)	−3.5 (25.7)	−1.3 (29.7)	2.3 (36.1)	9.3 (48.7)	12.7 (54.9)	17.0 (62.6)	15.8 (60.4)	12.1 (53.8)	3.4 (38.1)	−1.2 (29.8)	−4.1 (24.6)	−4.9 (23.2)
Average precipitation mm (inches)	34.9 (1.37)	44.0 (1.73)	69.0 (2.72)	120.9 (4.76)	164.3 (6.47)	182.1 (7.17)	250.5 (9.86)	191.1 (7.52)	105.0 (4.13)	88.6 (3.49)	56.0 (2.20)	22.0 (0.87)	1,328.4 (52.29)
Average precipitation days (≥ 0.1 mm)	8.8	9.8	12.5	13.5	14.6	14.3	15.5	13.9	11.4	11.3	9.9	8.0	143.5
Average snowy days	4.0	2.9	1.0	0	0	0	0	0	0	0	0.3	1.0	9.2
Average relative humidity (%)	77	77	77	78	79	82	83	82	80	80	81	77	79
Mean monthly sunshine hours	68.6	73.5	107.2	130.5	136.2	132.7	166.7	171.1	121.2	110.9	95.2	82.9	1,396.7
Percentage possible sunshine	21	23	29	34	32	31	39	42	33	32	30	26	31
Source: China Meteorological Administration all-time January high

== Transportation ==
The new Yichang-Wanzhou Railway crosses the northwestern part of the county, with two stations - Langping and Hejiaping - located near the eponymous towns of the county.

The China National Highway 318, and the newly constructed Shanghai-Chongqing Expressway (G50) run roughly parallel to the railway. Building the expressway in this area required the construction of a number of tunnels and remarkable bridges, such as the Longtanhe Bridge just outside Langping Town.

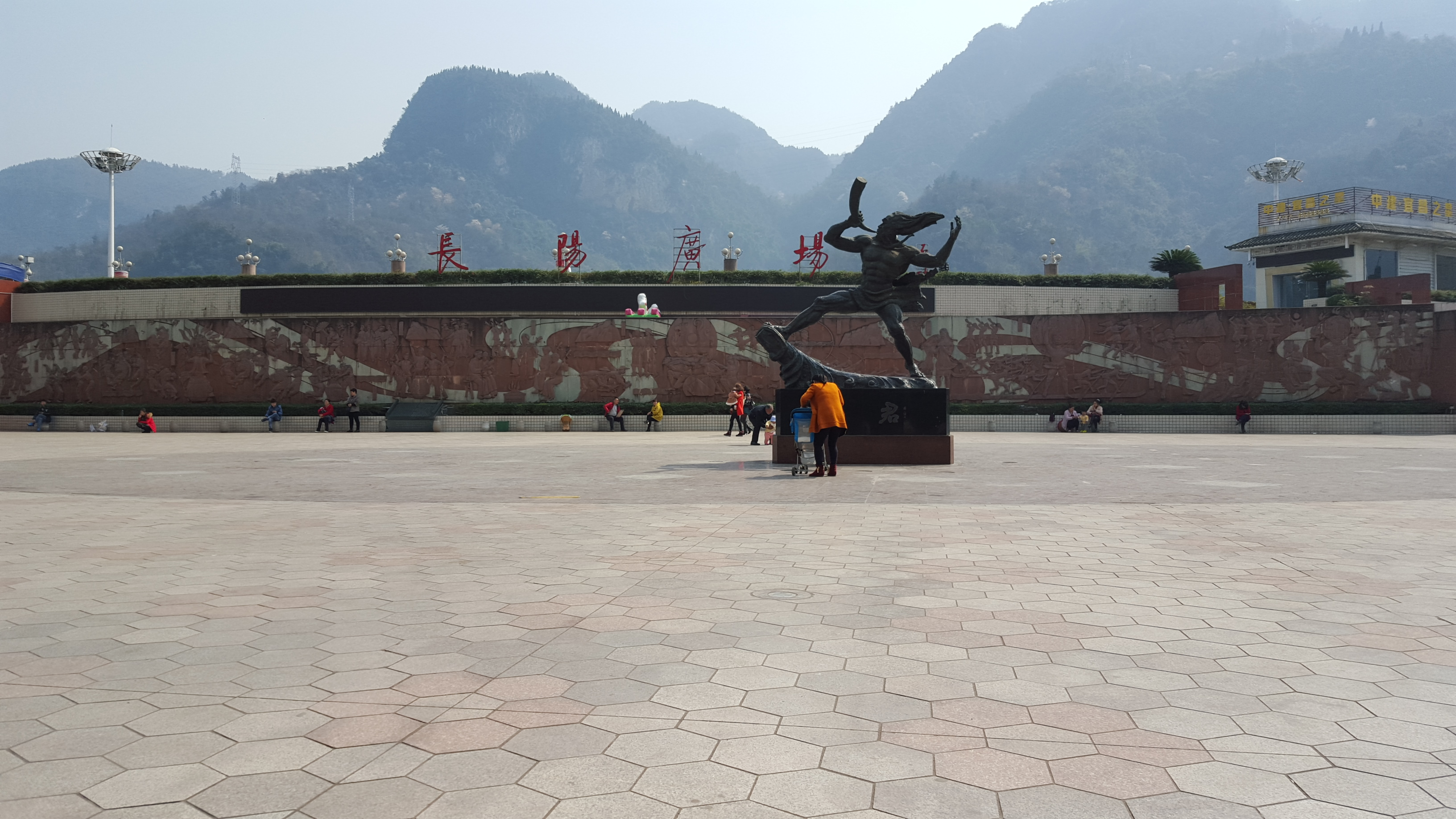
Changyang Square

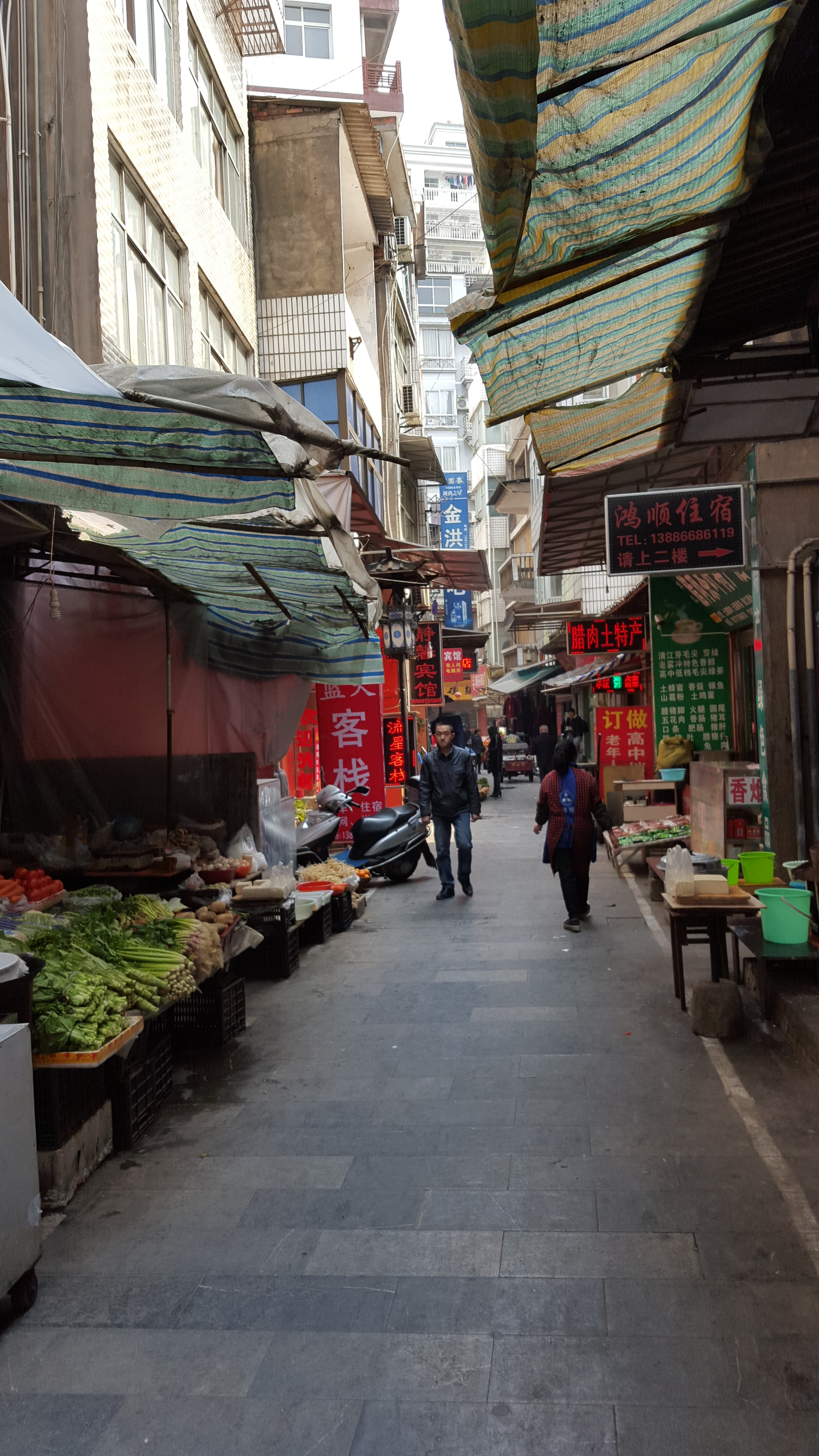
Old street

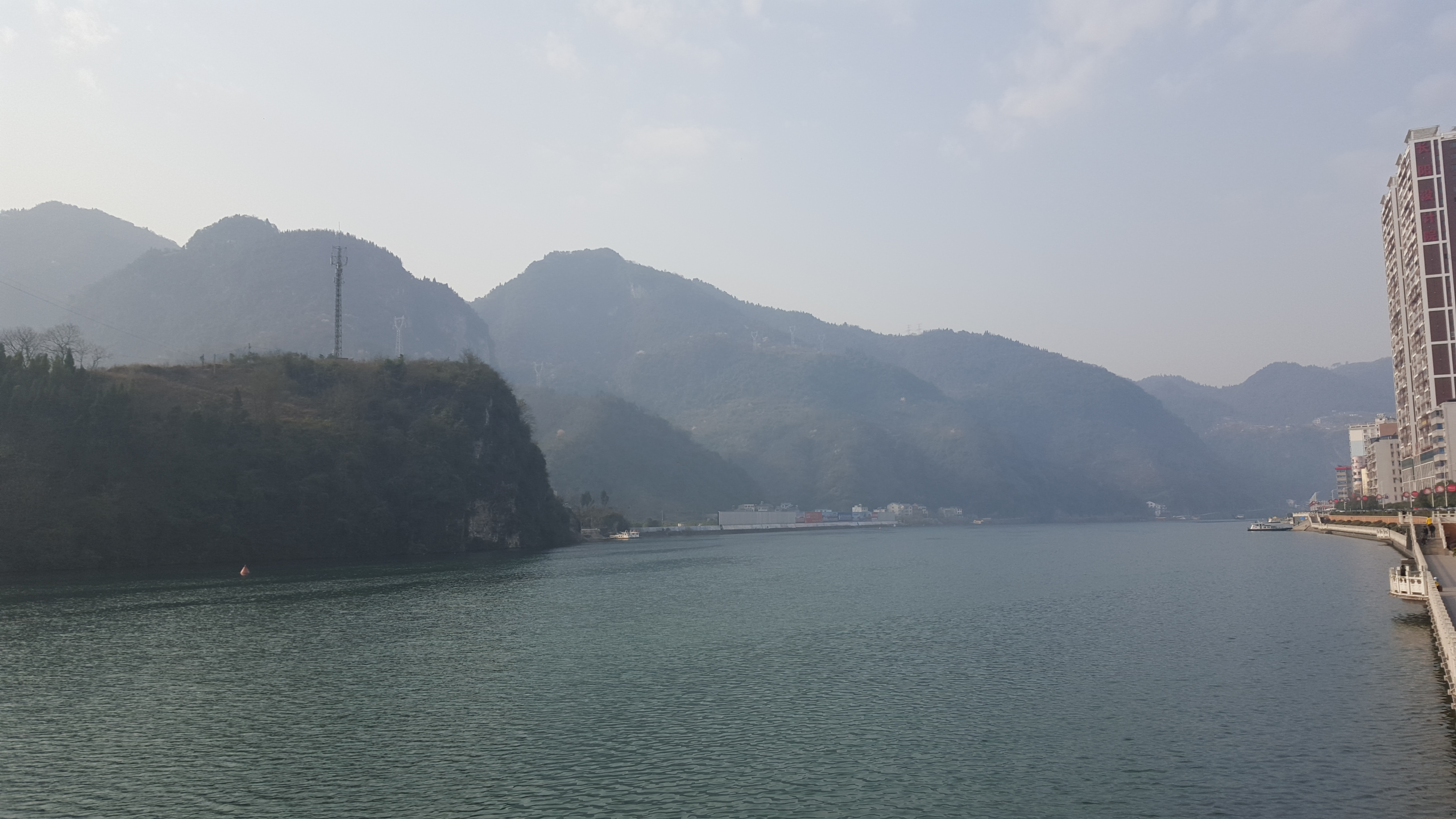
Qing River

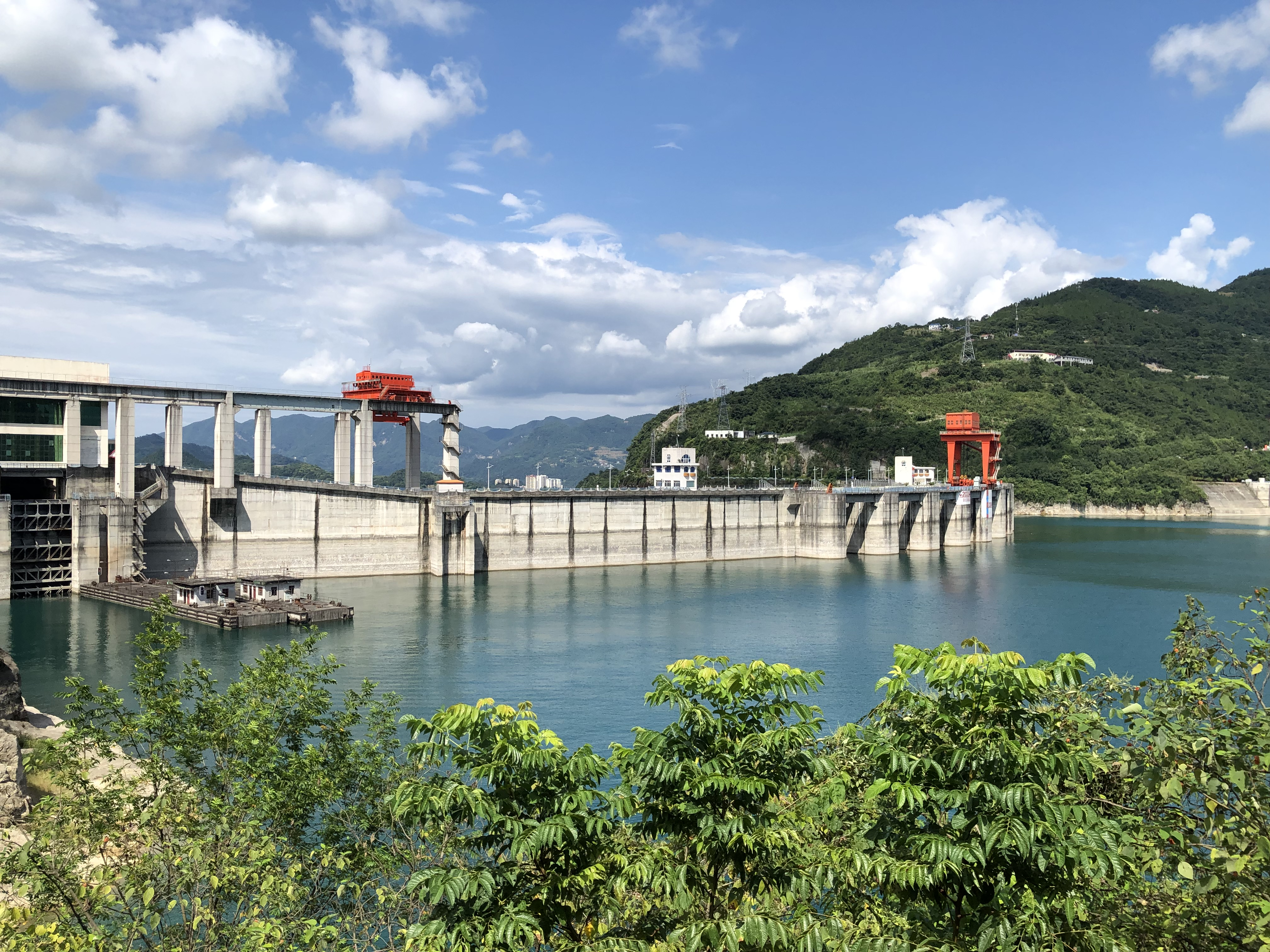
Geheyan Dam

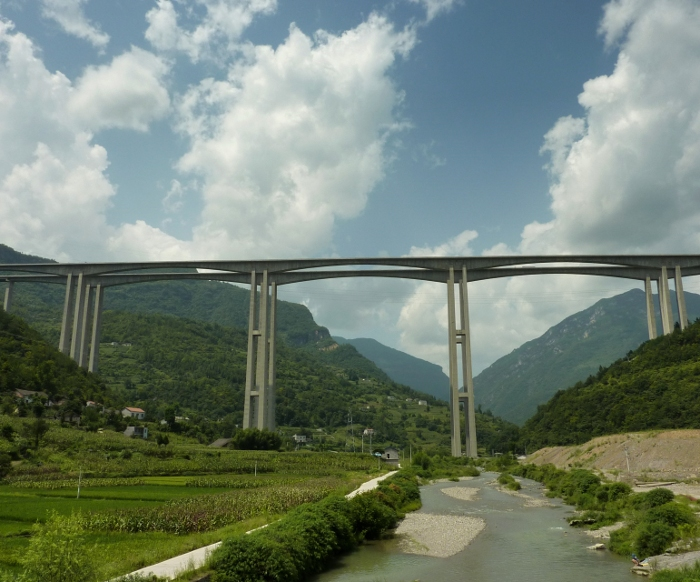
Longtanhe Bridge

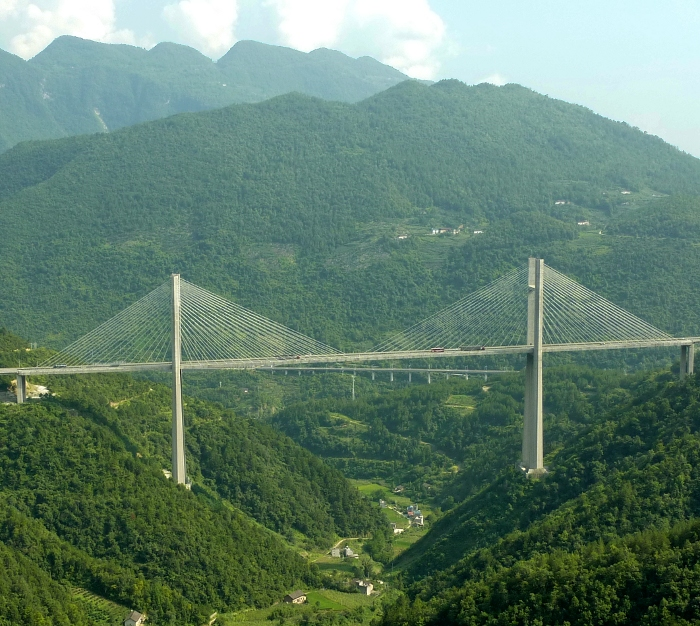
Tieluoping bridge, west of Langping town
