= Changyang railway station =

Railway station in Hubei, China

Changyang 长阳

General information
- Location: Hejiaping Town, Changyang Tujia Autonomous County, Yichang, Hubei; China
- Coordinates: 30.62247°N 110.84542°E
- Operated by: China Railway Corporation
- Line(s): Yiwan Railway

History
- Opened: October 18, 2012; 12 years ago

Changyang railway station is a railway station on the Yichang–Wanzhou Railway in Hubei Province of China. It is located in Hejiaping town (贺家坪镇) in Changyang Tujia Autonomous County of Yichang Prefecture-level City. It apparently was identified in early design documents as the Hejiaping Railway Station.

== History ==
A comparatively minor station, the Changyang station was opened on October 18, 2012, almost two years after the Yiwan Railway itself was opened. Two passenger trains from Wuhan stop here.
