= Arch bridge =

Bridge with arch-shaped supports

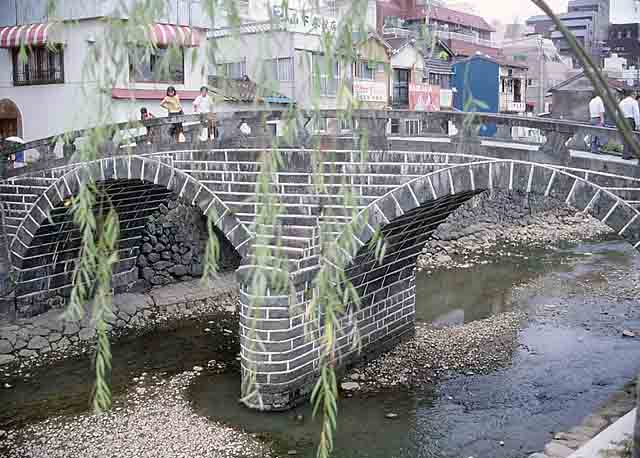
- A double-arch stone bridge in Nagasaki, Japan
- Span range: short, but often set end-to-end to form a large total length
- Material: masonry, concrete, wrought iron, cast iron, timber, structural steel
- Movable: No
- Design effort: Low
- Falsework required: Yes

An arch bridge is a bridge with abutments at each end shaped as a curved arch. Arch bridges work by transferring the weight of this bridge and its loads partially as horizontal thrust restrained by the abutments at either end, and partially as vertical loads on the arch supports. A viaduct (a long bridge) may be made from a series of arches, although other, more economical structures are typically used today.

== History ==
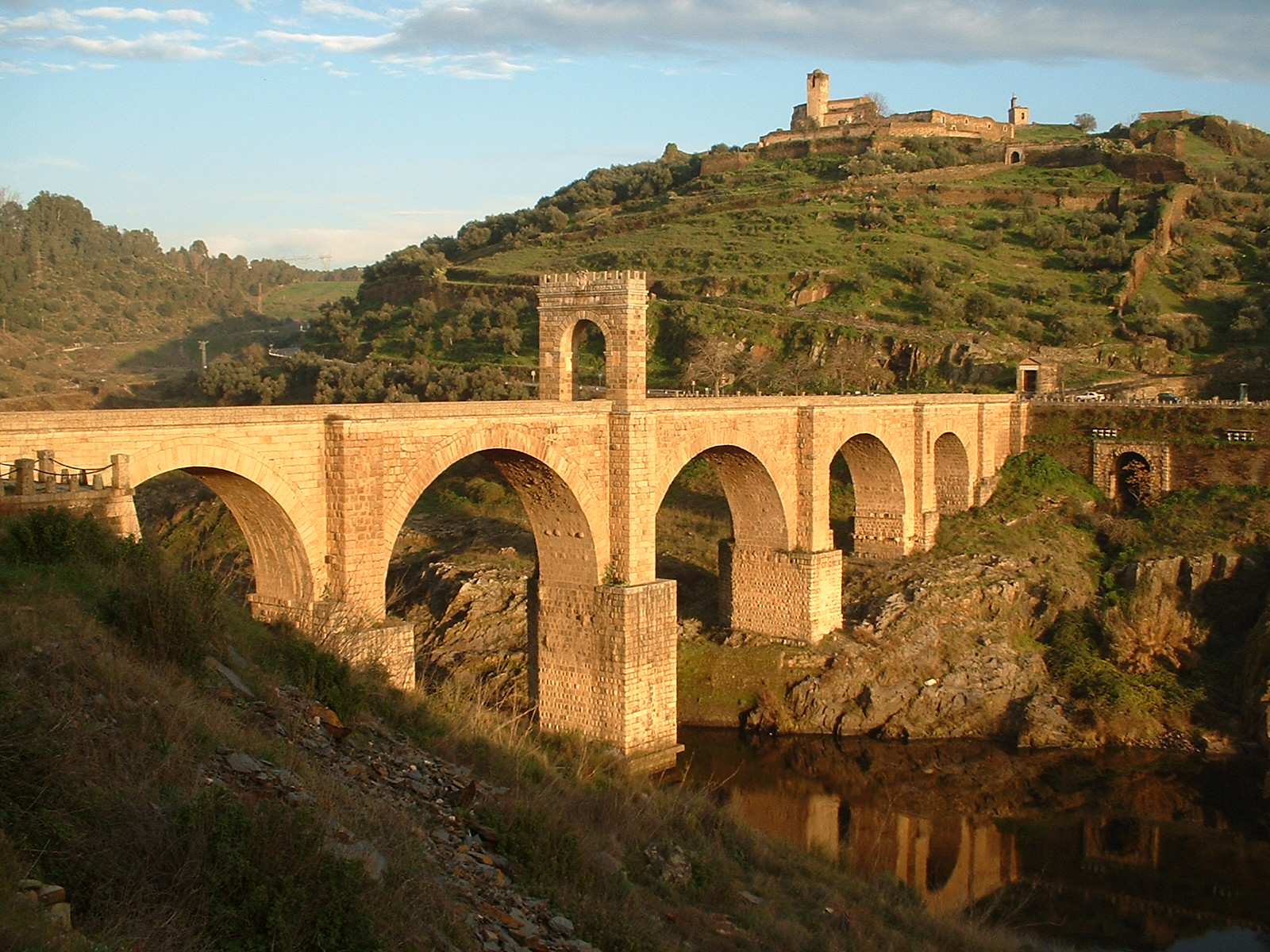
The Roman Alcántara Bridge, Spain (built 103-106 AD)

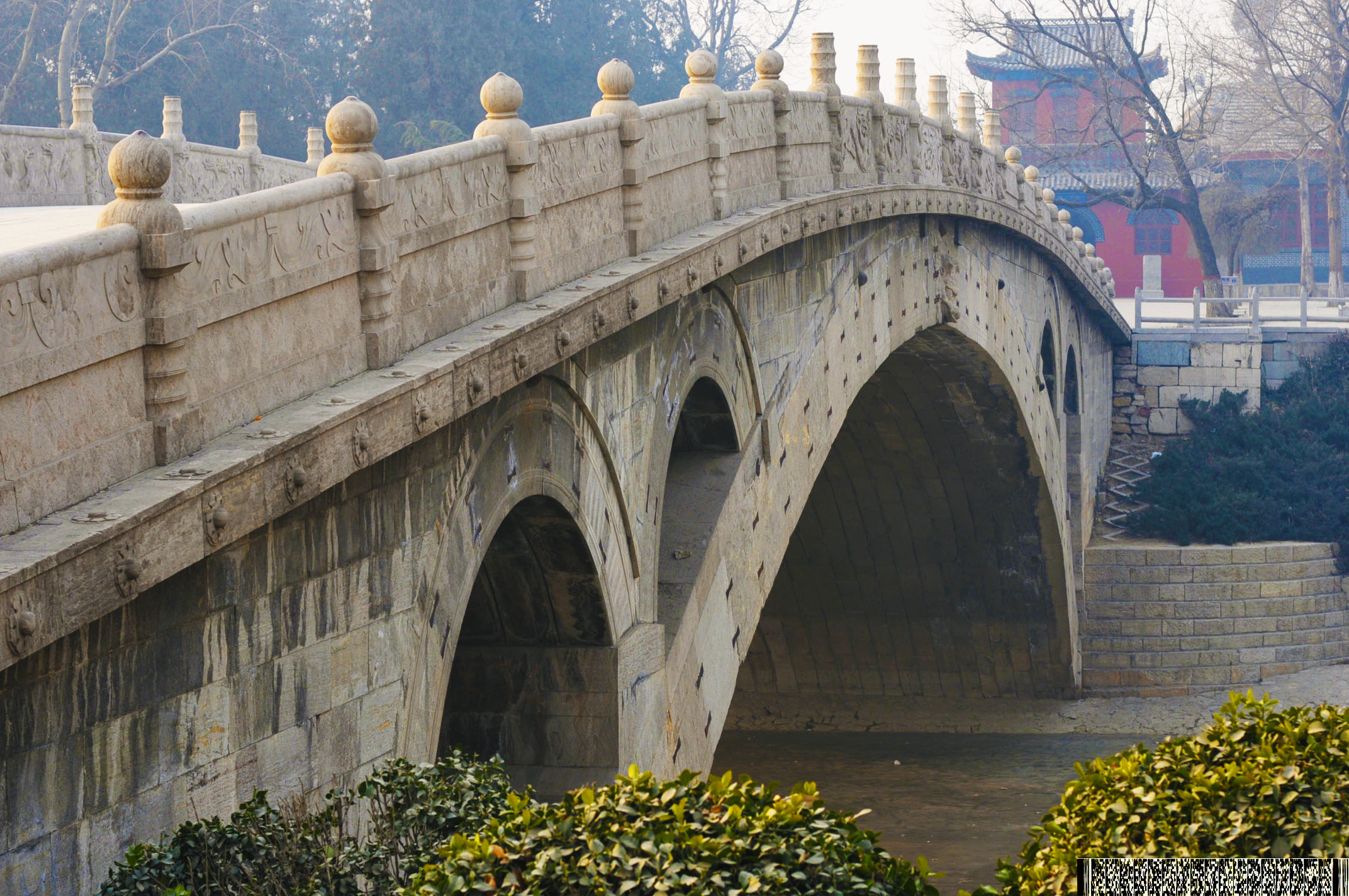
The Anji Bridge, 6–7th century AD

Possibly the oldest surviving arch bridge is the Mycenaean Arkadiko Bridge in Greece, dating to about 1300 BC. The local populace still uses the stone corbel arch bridge. The well-preserved Hellenistic Eleutherna Bridge has a triangular corbel arch. The 4th century BC Rhodes Footbridge rests on an early voussoir arch.

Although true arches were already known by the Etruscans and ancient Greeks, the Romans were – as with the vault and the dome – the first to realize the potential of arches for bridge construction fully. A list of Roman bridges compiled by the engineer Colin O'Connor features 330 Roman stone bridges for traffic, 34 Roman timber bridges and 54 Roman aqueduct bridges, a substantial part still standing and even used to carry vehicles. A more complete survey by the Italian scholar Vittorio Galliazzo found 931 Roman bridges, mostly of stone, in as many as 26 countries (including former Yugoslavia).

Roman arch bridges were usually semicircular, although a number were segmental arch bridges (such as the Alconétar Bridge), which have curved arches that are less than a semicircle. The advantages of the segmental arch bridge were that it allowed great amounts of flood water to pass under it, which would prevent the bridge from being swept away during floods and the bridge itself could be more lightweight. Generally, Roman bridges featured wedge-shaped primary arch stones (voussoirs) of the same size and shape. The Romans built both single-span and lengthy multiple-arch aqueducts, such as the Pont du Gard and Segovia Aqueduct. Their bridges featured from an early time onwards flood openings in the piers, e.g., in the Pons Fabricius in Rome (62 BC), one of the world's oldest major bridges still standing.

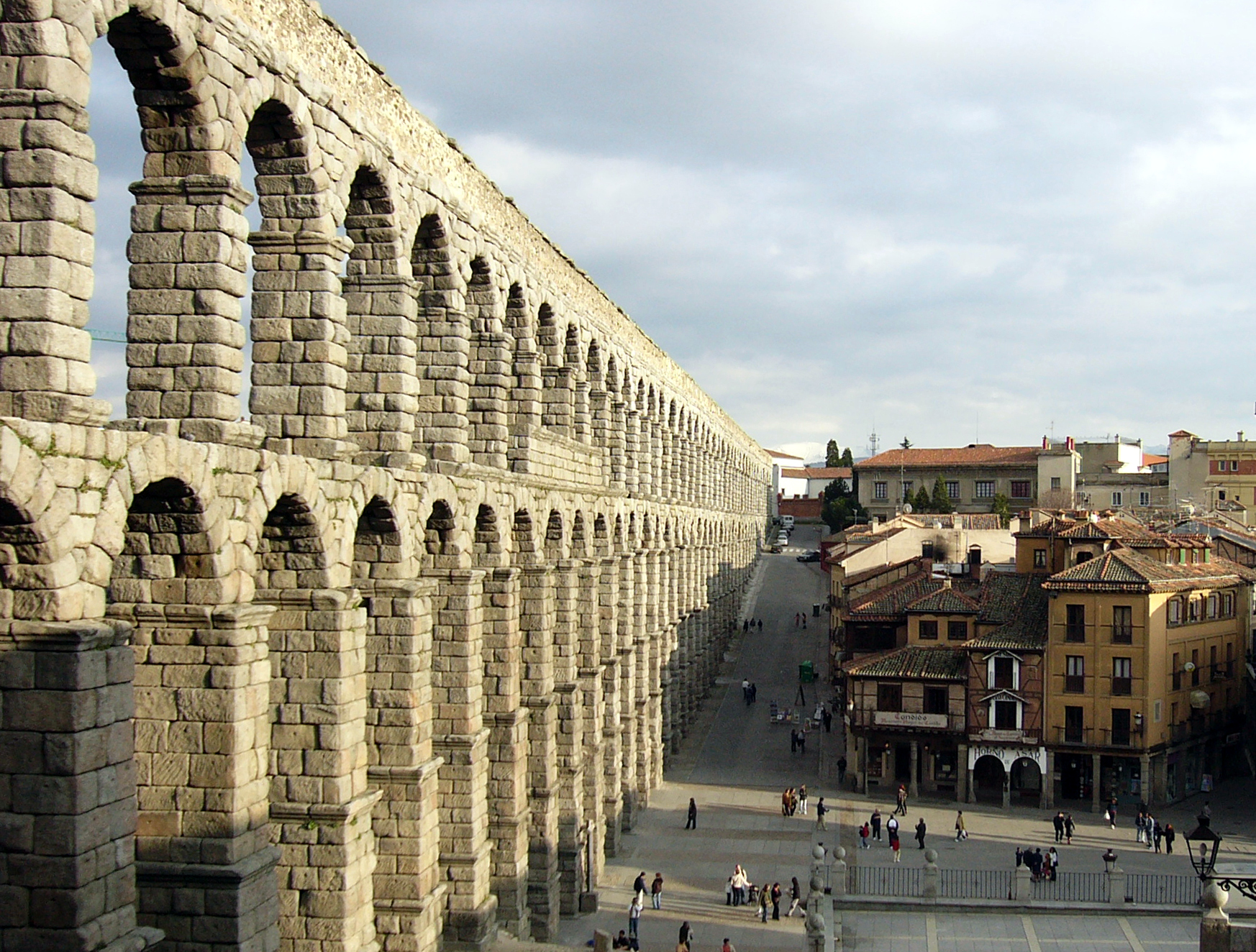
Segovia Aqueduct (c. 100 AD)

Roman engineers were the first and until the Industrial Revolution the only ones to construct bridges with concrete, which they called Opus caementicium. The outside was usually covered with brick or ashlar, as in the Alcántara Bridge.

The Romans also introduced segmental arch bridges into bridge construction. The 330 m-long (1,080 ft) Limyra Bridge in southwestern Turkey features 26 segmental arches with an average span-to-rise ratio of 5.3:1, giving the bridge an unusually flat profile unsurpassed for more than a millennium. Trajan's Bridge over the Danube featured open-spandrel segmental arches made of wood (standing on 40 m-high (130 ft) concrete piers). This was to be the longest arch bridge for a thousand years, both in terms of overall and individual span length, while the longest extant Roman bridge is the 790 m-long (2,590 ft) long Puente Romano at Mérida. The late Roman Karamagara Bridge in Cappadocia may represent the earliest surviving bridge featuring a pointed arch.

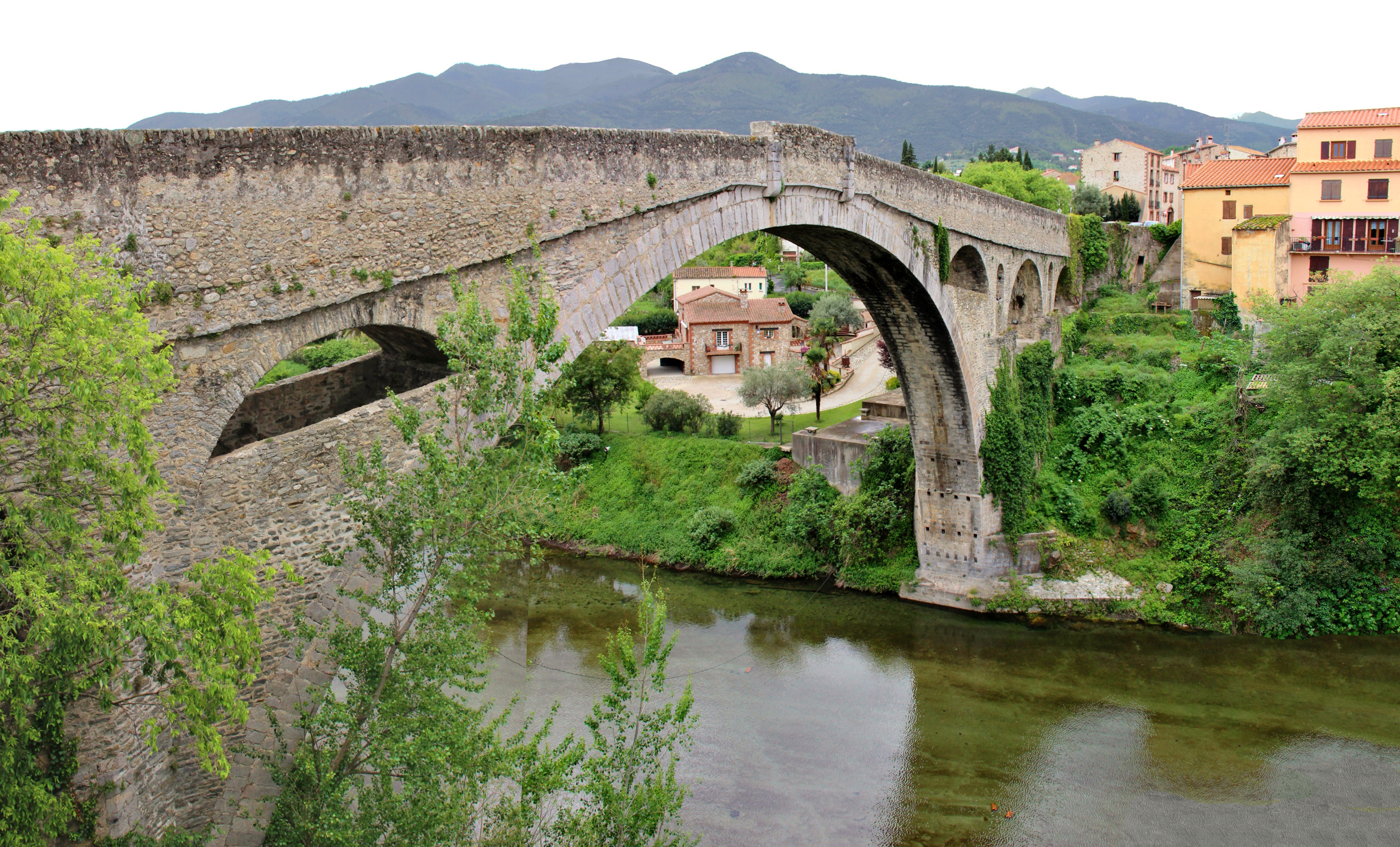
Devil's bridge, Céret, France (1341)

In medieval Europe, bridge builders improved upon Roman structures by using narrower piers, thinner arch barrels, and higher span-to-rise ratios. Gothic pointed arches were also introduced, reducing lateral thrust, and spans increased as with the eccentric Puente del Diablo (1282). With more advanced design and bridge-building techniques, the alternative informal name for Devil's Bridge became more widely used across Europe, as many people could not believe that such structures were manufactured and capable of carrying loads of that size.

The 14th century, in particular, saw bridge building reach new heights. Span lengths of 40 m (130 ft), previously unheard of in the history of masonry arch construction, were now reached in places as diverse as Spain (Puente de San Martín), Italy (Castelvecchio Bridge) and France (Devil's bridge and Pont Grand) and with arch types as different as semi-circular, pointed and segmental arches. The bridge at Trezzo sull'Adda, destroyed in the 15th century, even featured a span length of 72 m (236 ft), not matched until 1796.

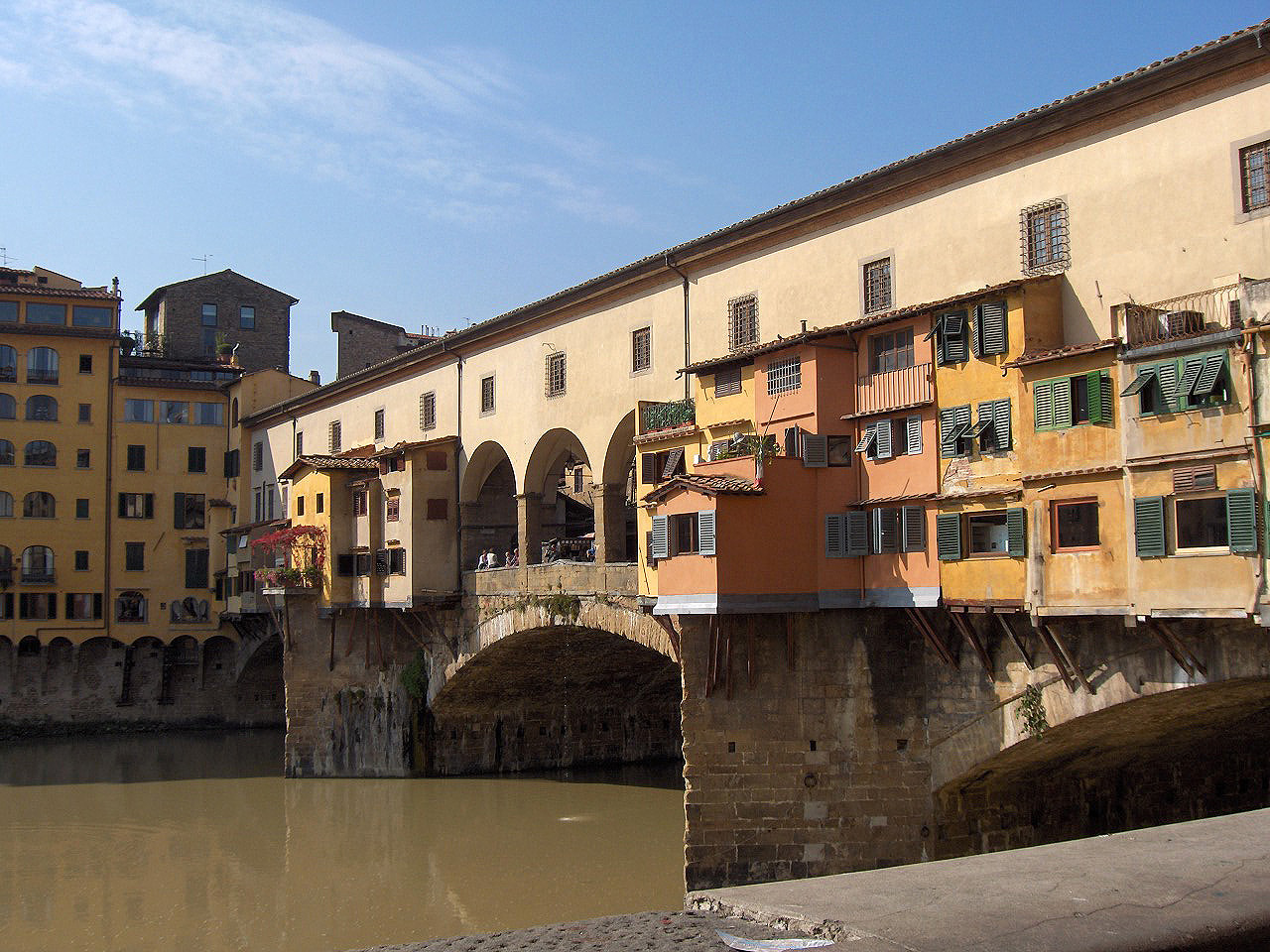
The Ponte Vecchio, Florence, Italy (1345)

Constructions such as the acclaimed Florentine segmental-arch bridge Ponte Vecchio (1345) combined sound engineering (a span-to-rise ratio of over 5.3:1) with aesthetic appeal. The three elegant arches of the Renaissance Ponte Santa Trinita (1569) constitute the oldest elliptic arch bridge worldwide. Such low rising structures required massive abutments, which at the Venetian Rialto Bridge (1591) and the Pegnitz or Fleischbrücke (1598) in Nuremberg (span-to-rise ratio 6.4:1) were founded on thousands of wooden piles, partly rammed obliquely into the grounds to counteract more effectively the lateral thrust.

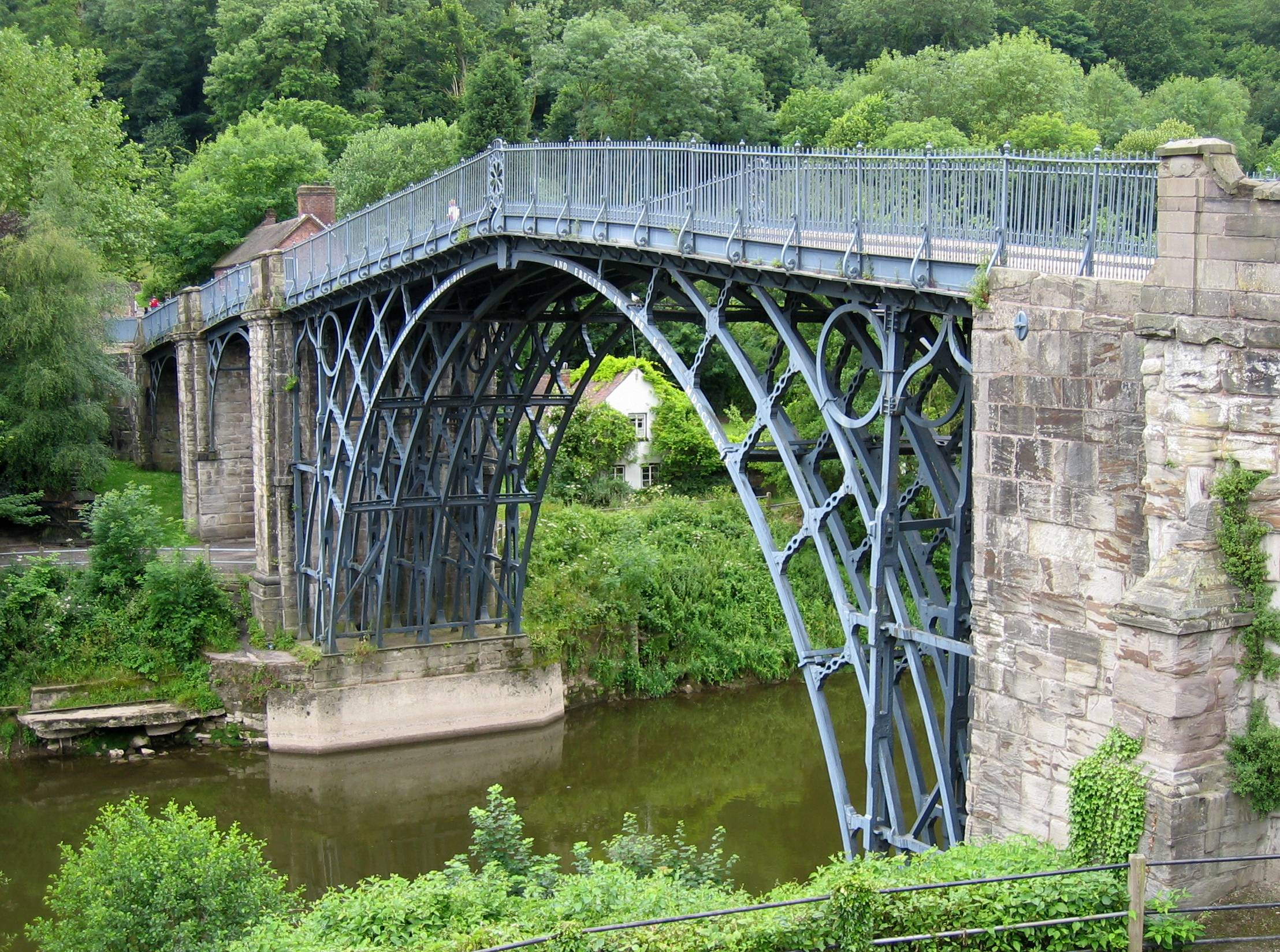
The Iron Bridge at Ironbridge over the River Severn gorge in Shropshire, England — the first cast iron bridge, opened in 1781 and built using traditional woodworking techniques

In China, the oldest extant arch bridge is the Zhaozhou Bridge of 605 CE, which combined a very low span-to-rise ratio of 5.2:1, with the use of spandrel arches (buttressed with iron brackets). The Zhaozhou Bridge, with a length of 51 metres (167 ft) and a span of 37.4 metres (123 ft), is the world's first wholly stone open-spandrel segmental arch bridge, allowing greater passage for floodwaters. Bridges with perforated spandrels can be found worldwide, such as the Bridge of Arta, (17th century) Greece, and Cenarth Bridge, (18th century) in Wales.

With the coming of the Industrial Revolution, in the 18th and 19th centuries, stone and brick arches continued to be built by many prominent British civil engineers, including Thomas Telford, John Rennie, and latterly Isambard Kingdom Brunel. They also started the modern usage of different materials, such as cast iron — Telford designed the first bridge built of metal, completed in 1781, the Iron Bridge with a single arch of sections of cast iron constructed in traditional woodworking techniques — and then steel and concrete, which have been increasingly used in the construction of arch bridges, to almost the exclusion of other materials. A key pioneer was Jean-Rodolphe Perronet, who used much narrower piers, revised calculation methods, and exceptionally low span-to-rise ratios.

== Simple compression arch bridges ==
=== Advantages of simple materials ===
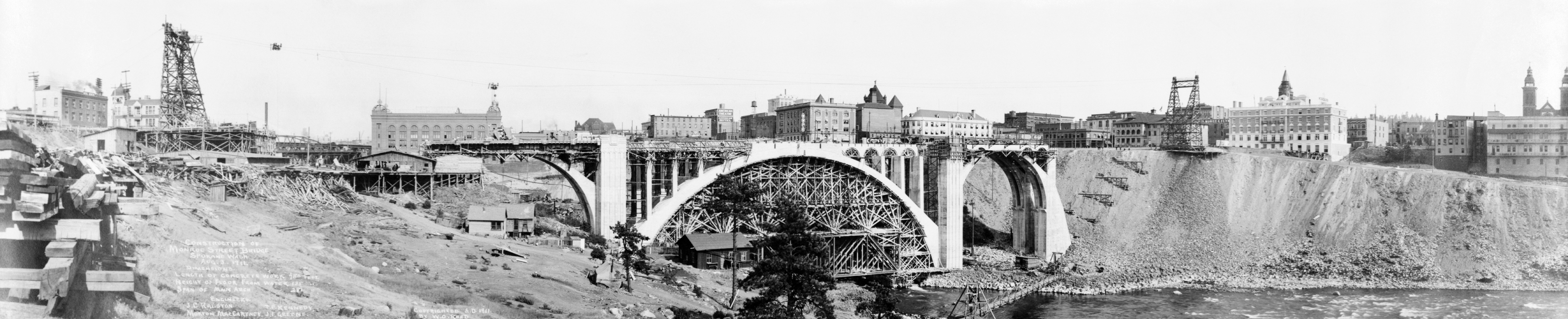
Falsework centering in the center arch of Monroe Street Bridge, Spokane, Washington. 1911.

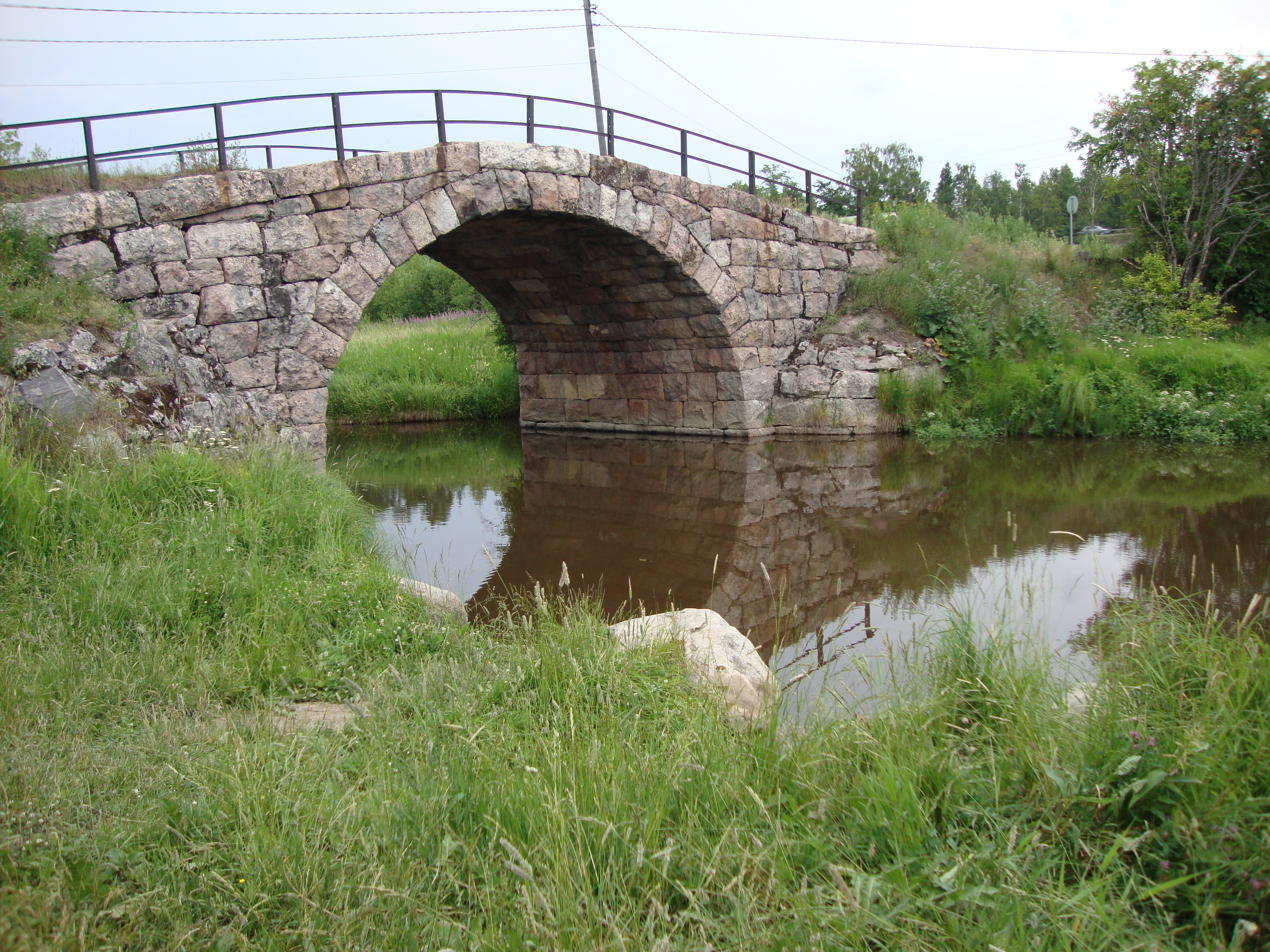
The old stone arch bridge over the Kerava River in Kerava, Finland

Stone, brick, and other such materials are strong in compression and somewhat so in shear, but cannot resist much force in tension. As a result, masonry arch bridges are designed to be kept under constant compression, so far as possible. Each arch is constructed over a temporary falsework frame, known as a centring. In the first compression arch bridges, a keystone in the middle of the bridge bore the weight of the rest of the bridge. The more weight that was put onto the bridge, the stronger its structure became. Masonry arch bridges use a quantity of fill material (typically compacted rubble) above the arch to increase the dead weight on the bridge and prevent tension from occurring in the arch ring as loads move across the bridge. Other materials used to build this type of bridge included brick and unreinforced concrete. When masonry (cut stone) is used, the angles of the faces are cut to minimize shear forces. Where random masonry (uncut and unprepared stones) is used, they are mortared together, and the mortar is allowed to set before the falsework is removed.

Traditional masonry arches are generally durable and somewhat resistant to settlement or undermining. However, relative to modern alternatives, such bridges are very heavy, requiring extensive foundations. They are also expensive to build in areas with high labor costs.

=== Construction sequence ===
Workflow on the Roman Bridge at Limyra: the falsework was moved to another opening as soon as the lower arch rib had been completed

The Roman segmental arch Bridge at Limyra

- Where the arches are founded in a watercourse bed (on piers or banks), the water is diverted so the gravel can first be excavated and replaced with a good footing (of strong material). From these, the foundation piers are erected/raised to the height of the intended base of the arches, a point known as the springing.
- Falsework centering (in British English: arch frame) is fabricated, typically from timbers and boards. Since each arch of a multi-arch bridge will impose a thrust upon its neighbors, it is necessary either that all arches of the bridge be raised at the same time, or that very wide piers be used. The thrust from the end arches is taken into the earth by substantial (vertical) footings at the canyon walls, or by large inclined planes forming, in a sense, ramps to the bridge, which may also be formed of arches.
- Several arches are (or a single arch is) constructed over the centering. Once each basic arch barrel is constructed, the arches are (or arch is) stabilized with infill masonry above, which may be laid in horizontal running bond courses (layers). These may form two outer walls, known as the spandrels, which are then infilled with appropriate loose material and rubble.
- The road is paved and parapet walls protectively confine traffic to the bridge.

== Types of arch bridge ==
=== Corbel arch bridge ===
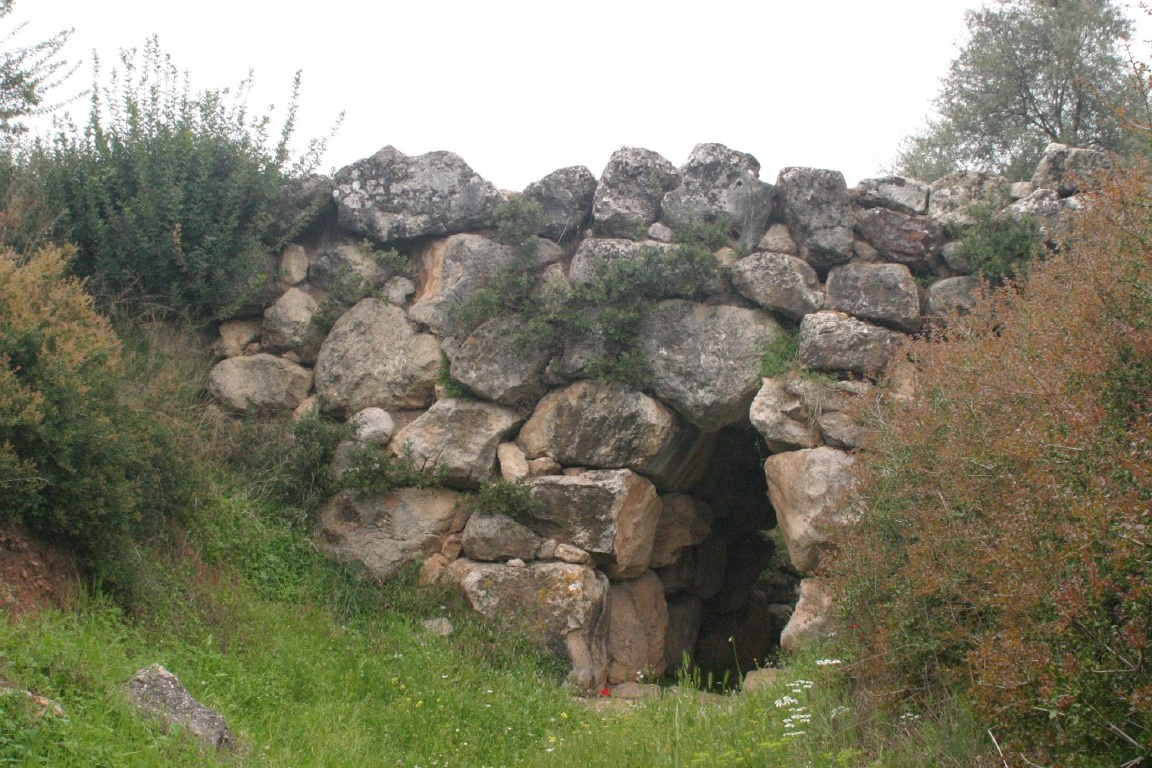
Corbel arch built from Cyclopean masonry, in the Greek Arkadiko bridge

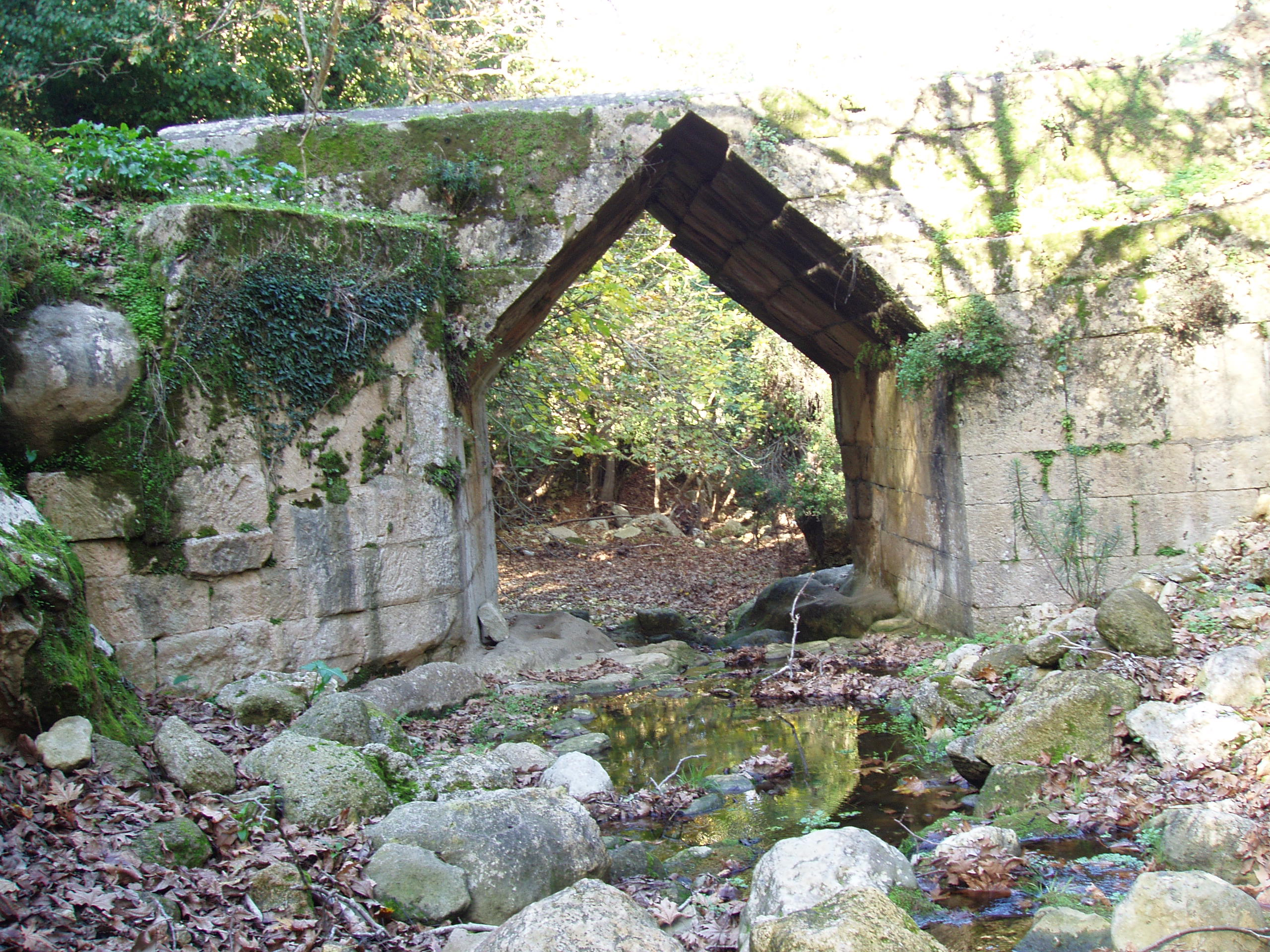
Corbel arch in the shape of an isosceles triangle, supporting the Greek Eleutherna Bridge

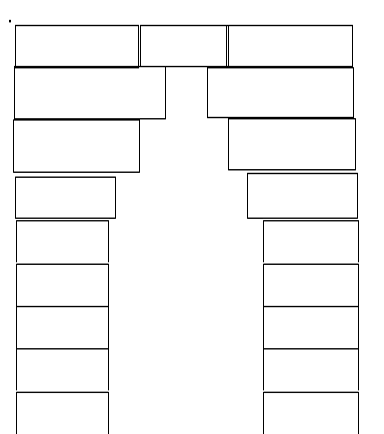
A corbelled arch with the masonry untrimmed

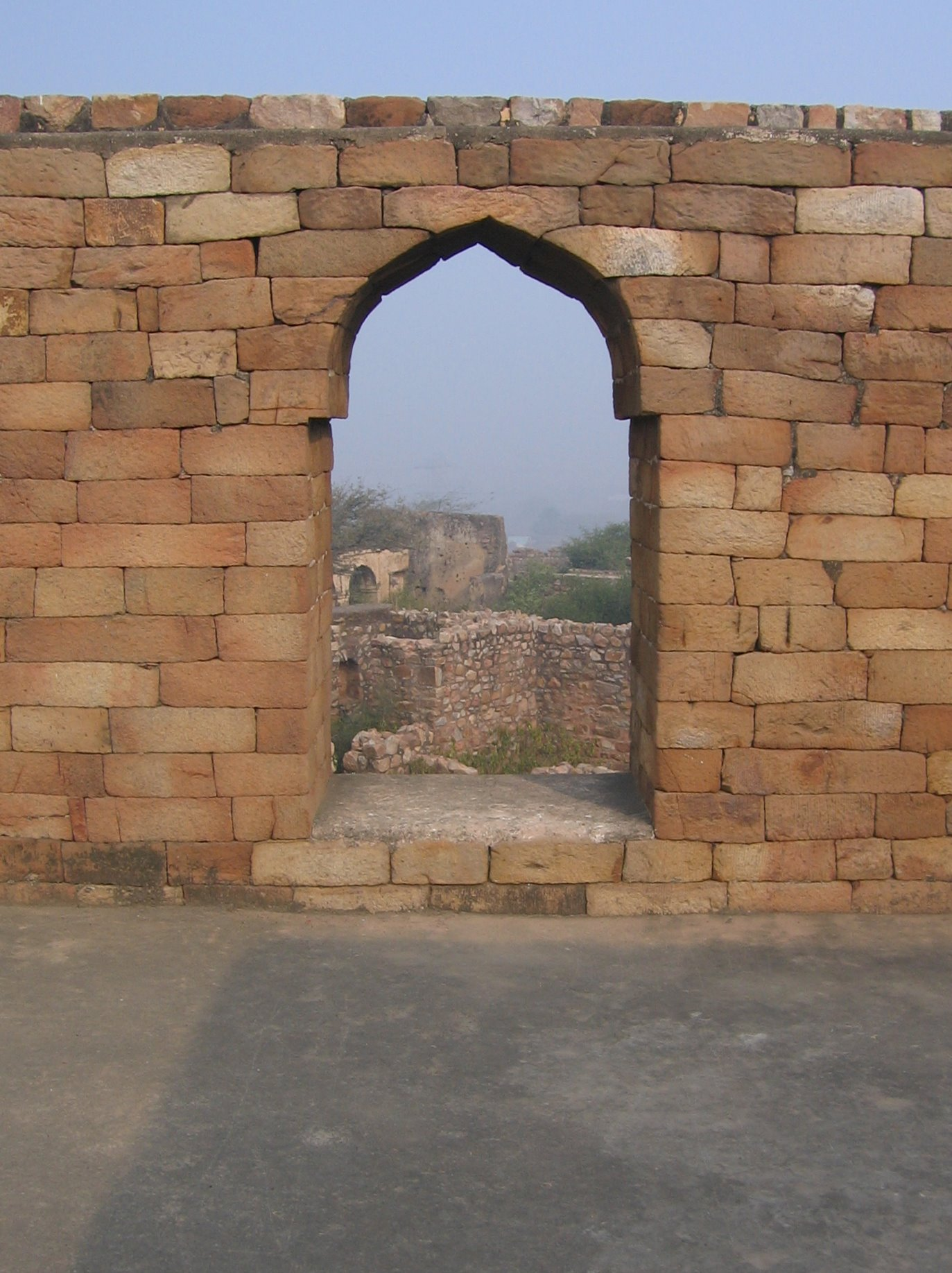
A corbel arch with the masonry cut into an arch shape

The corbel arch bridge is a masonry, or stone, bridge where each successively higher course (layer) cantilevers slightly more than the previous course. The steps of the masonry may be trimmed to make the arch have a rounded shape. The corbel arch does not produce thrust, or outward pressure at the bottom of the arch, and is not considered a true arch. It is more stable than a true arch because it does not have this thrust. The disadvantage is that this type of arch is not suitable for large spans.

=== Aqueducts ===
Aqueducts — bridges carrying water-supply and navigable aqueducts

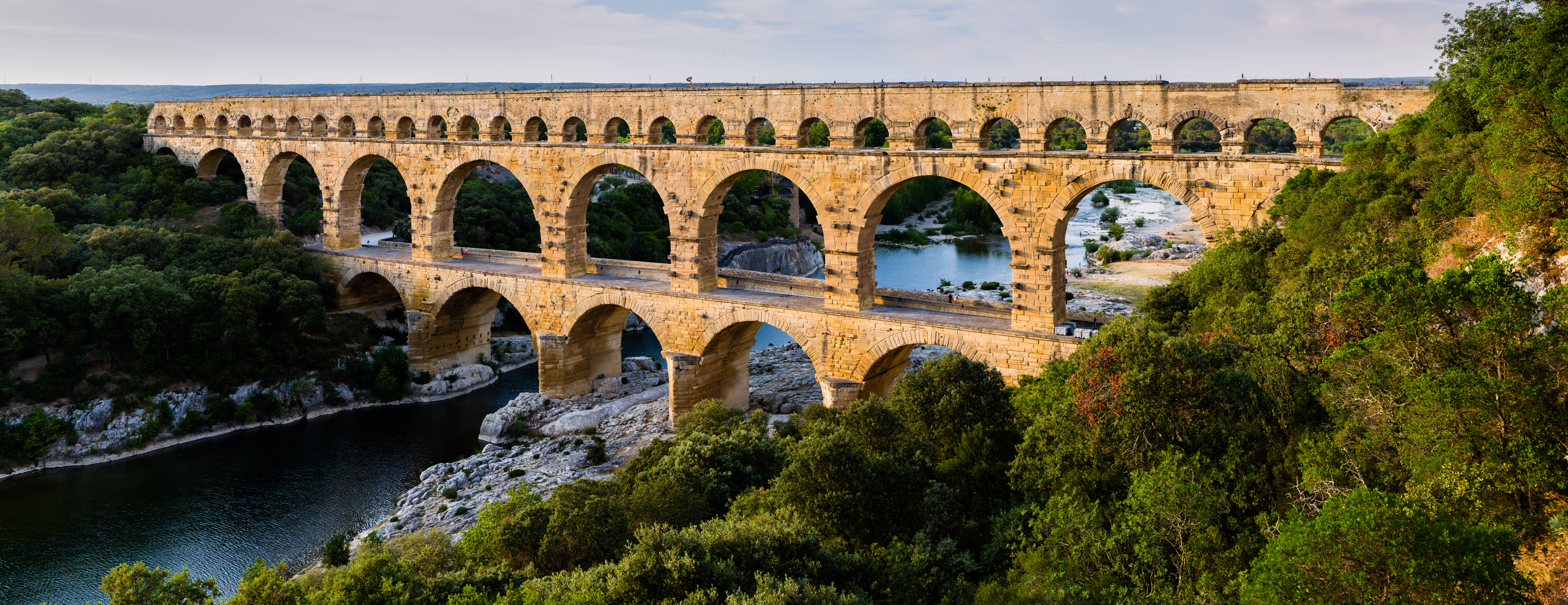
The three-story Roman Pont du Gard aqueduct near Nimes, France

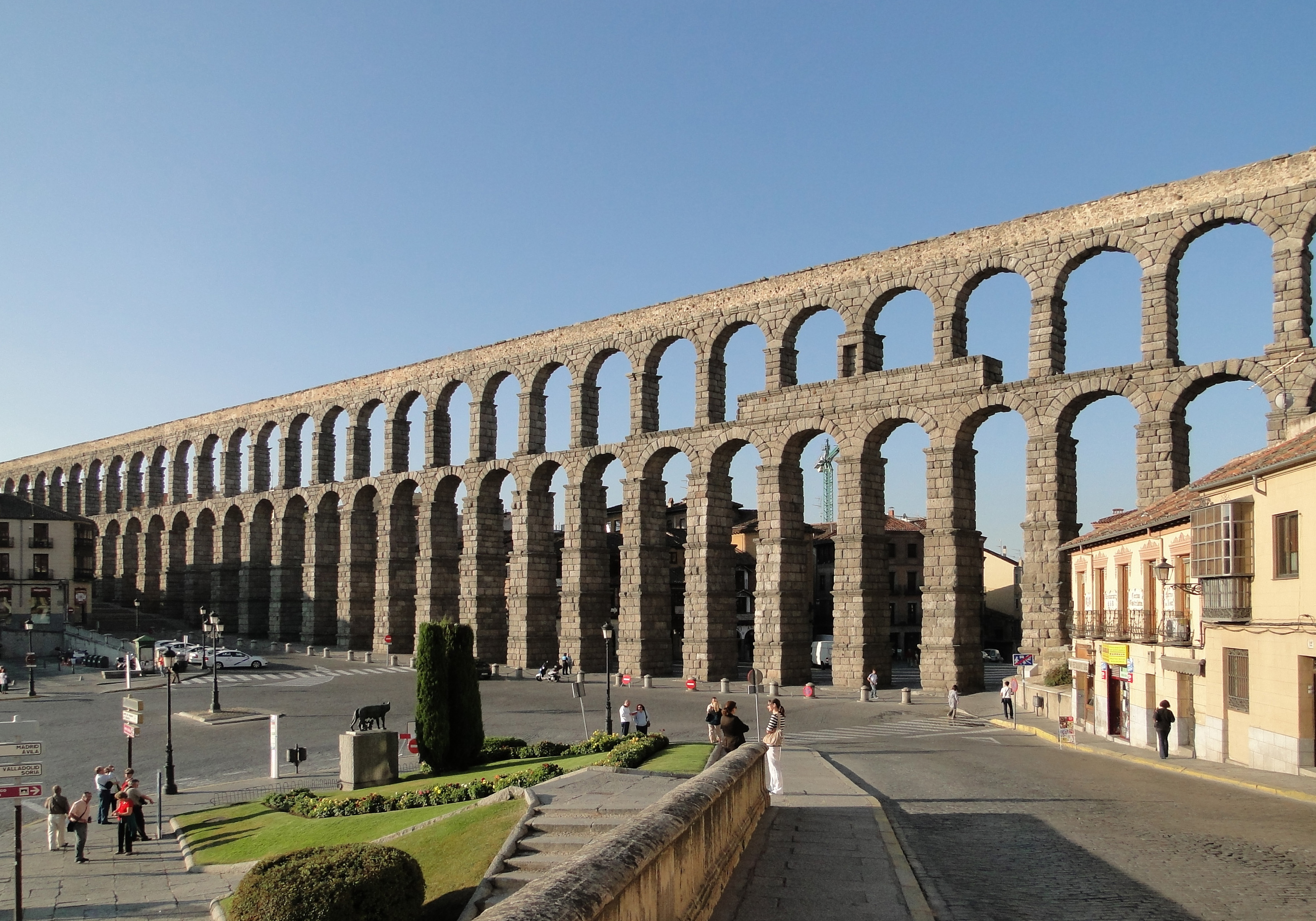
Roman Aqueduct of Segovia, Spain

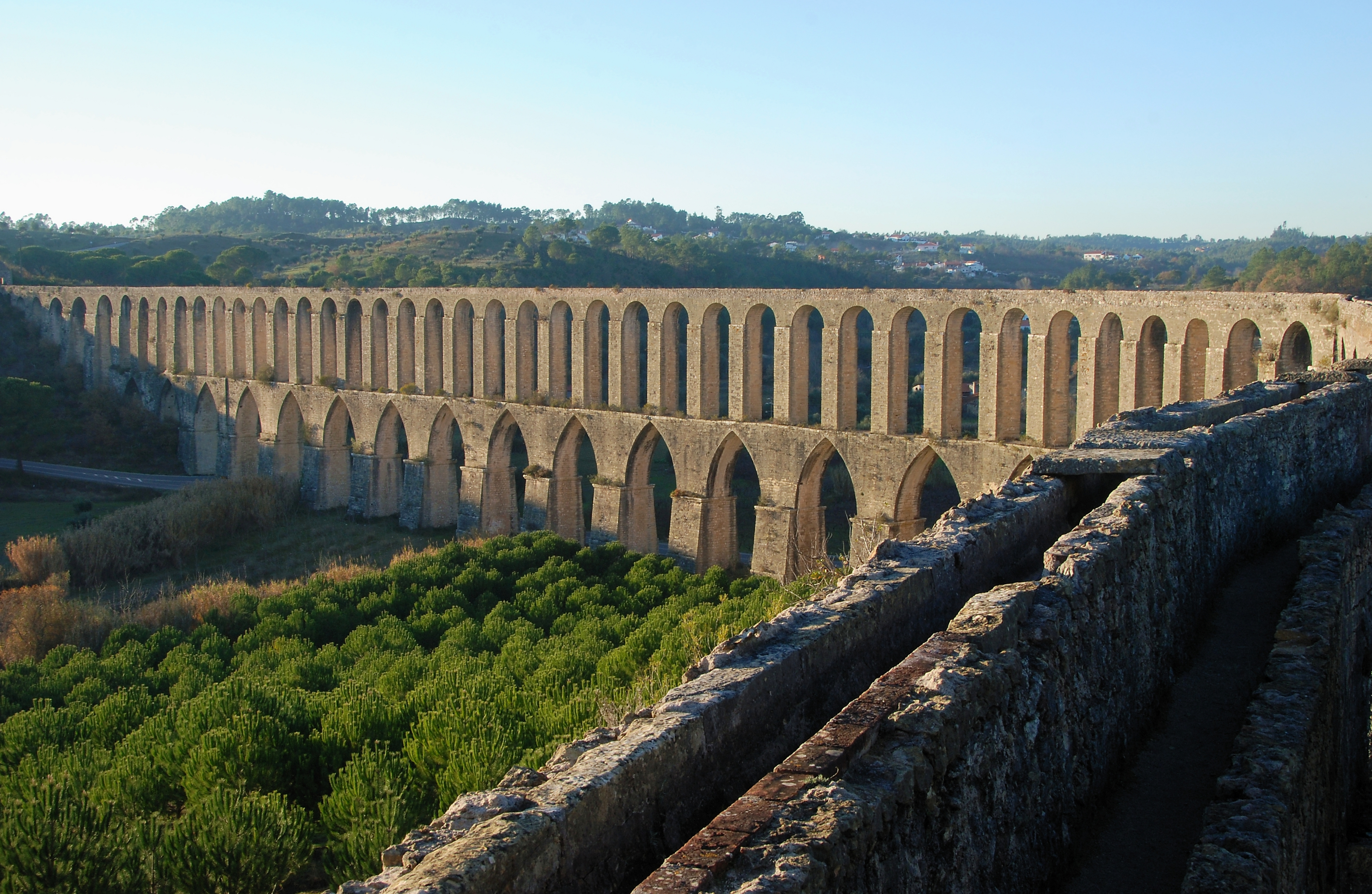
The Aqueduto dos Pegões in Tomar, Portugal

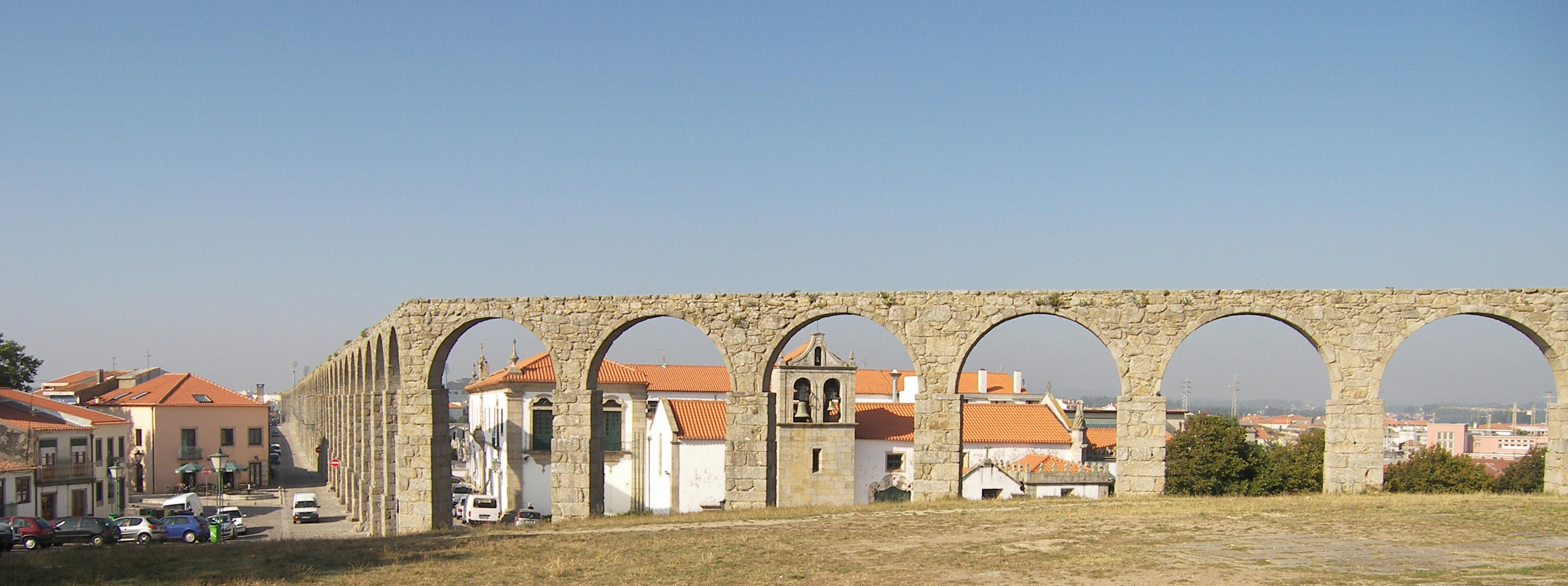
The Aqueduct of Vila do Conde, Portugal with a distinct angular turn

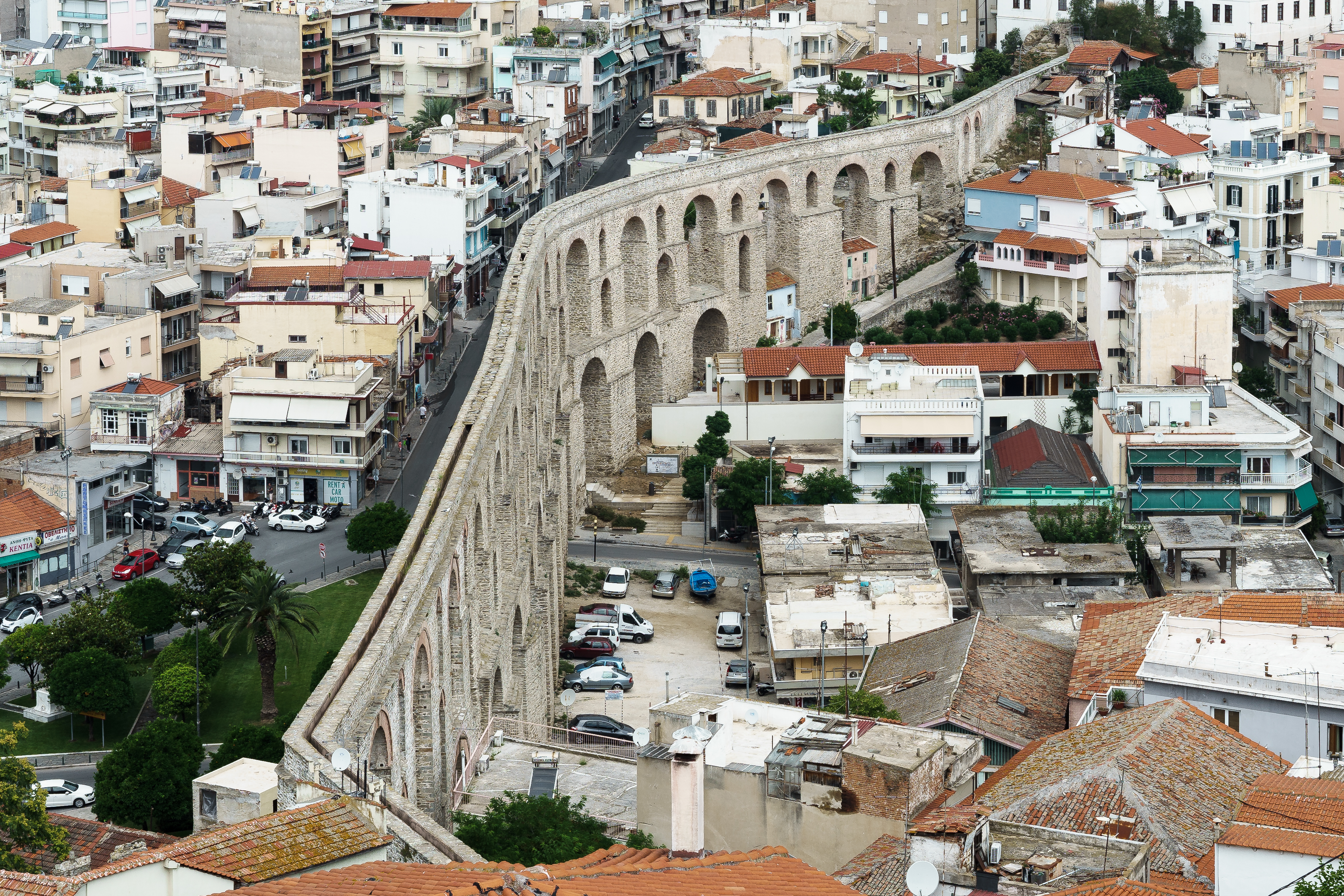
16th-century Ottoman Kavala aqueduct, Greece with both a distinct angular turn and a curve in the structure shown in an overhead image

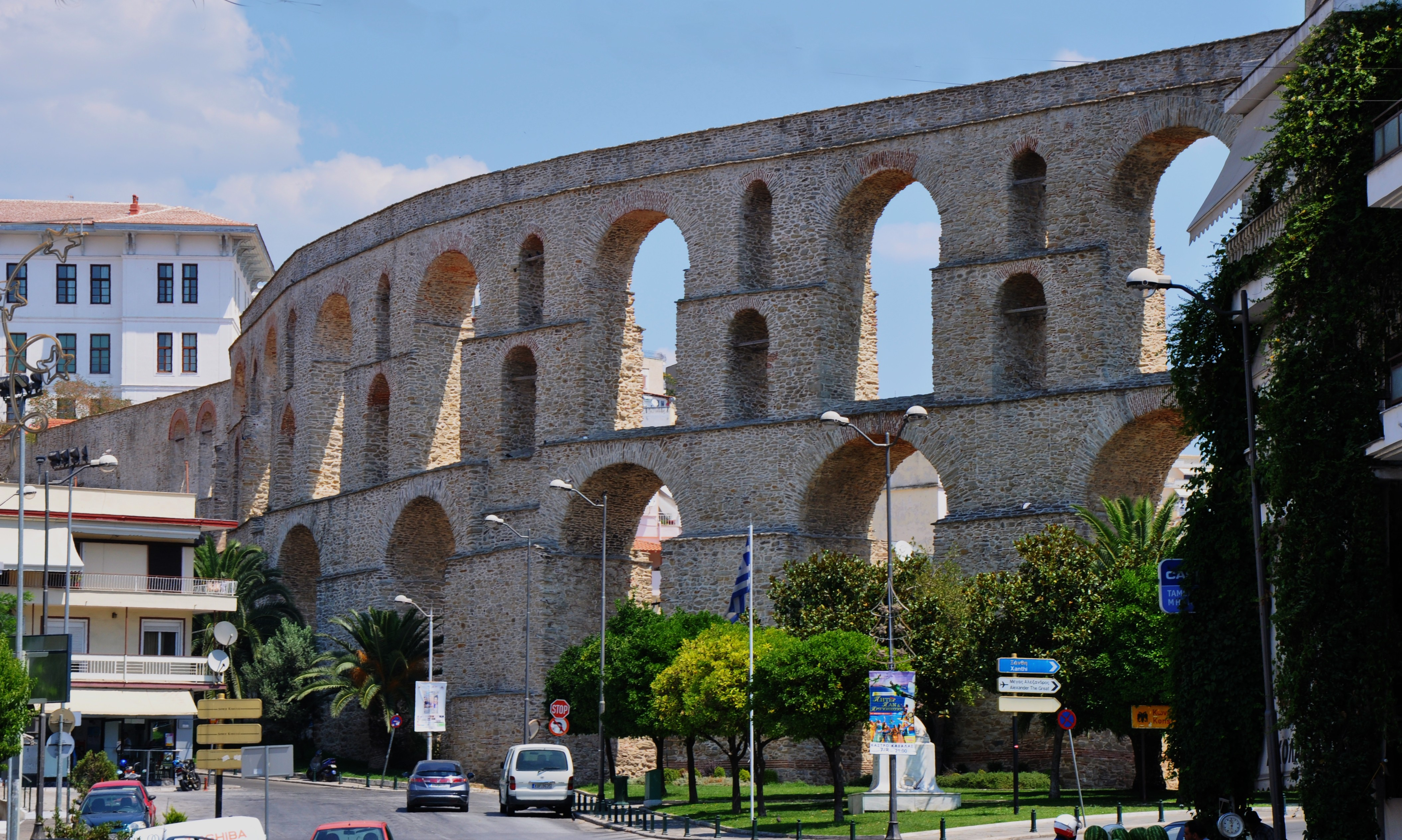
Kavala aqueduct near Nikotsara Square showing the curve of the structure from street level

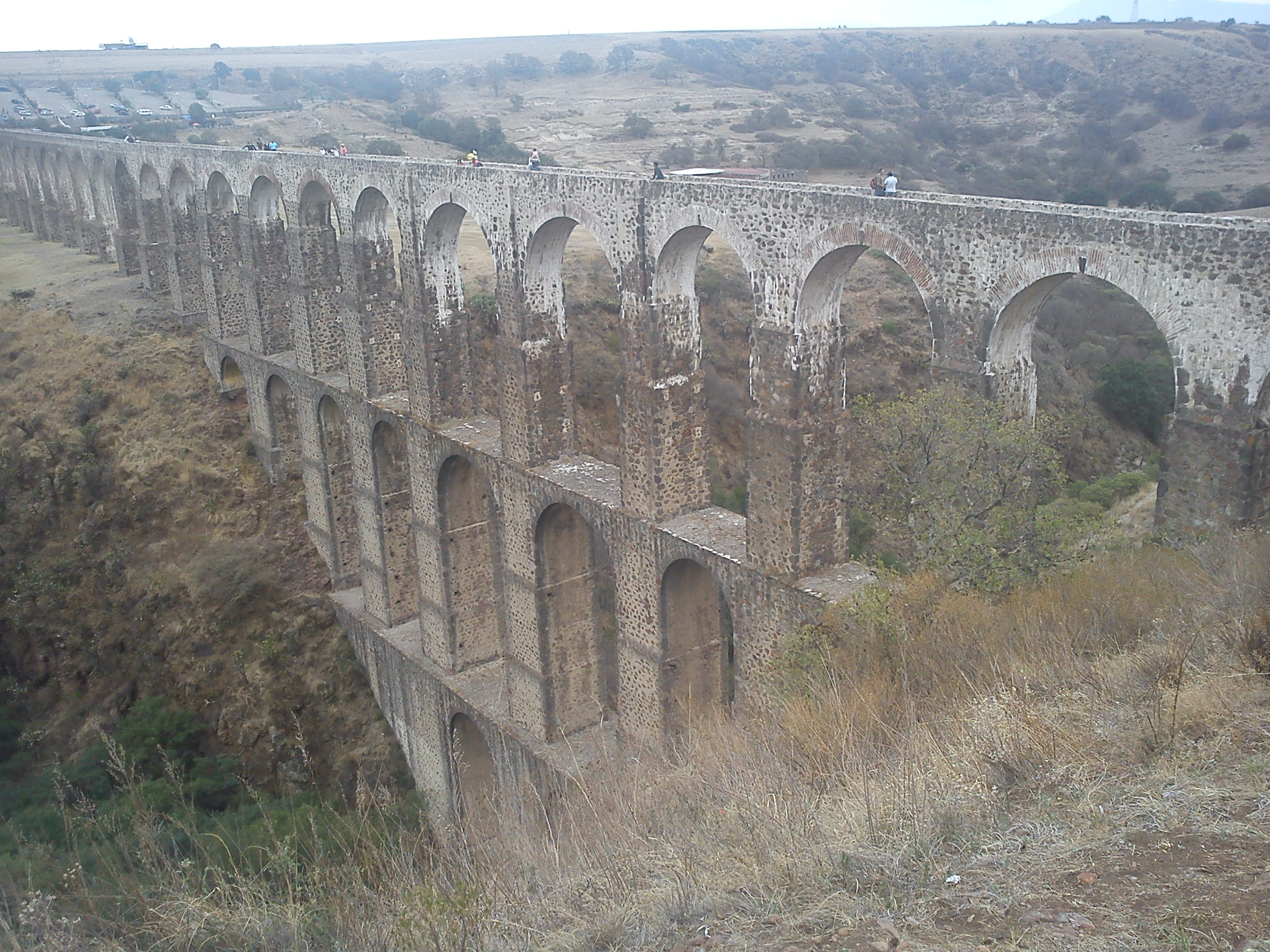
The colonial Aqueduct, Tepotzotlán, State of Mexico

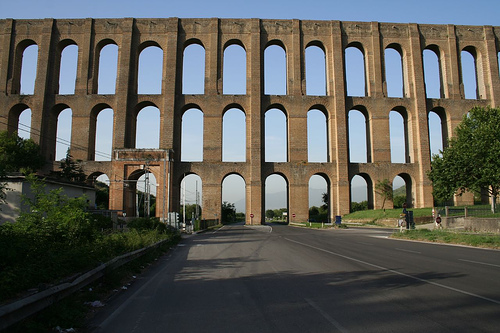
UNESCO World Heritage Site Aqueduct of Vanvitelli, Italy, built by Luigi Vanvitelli

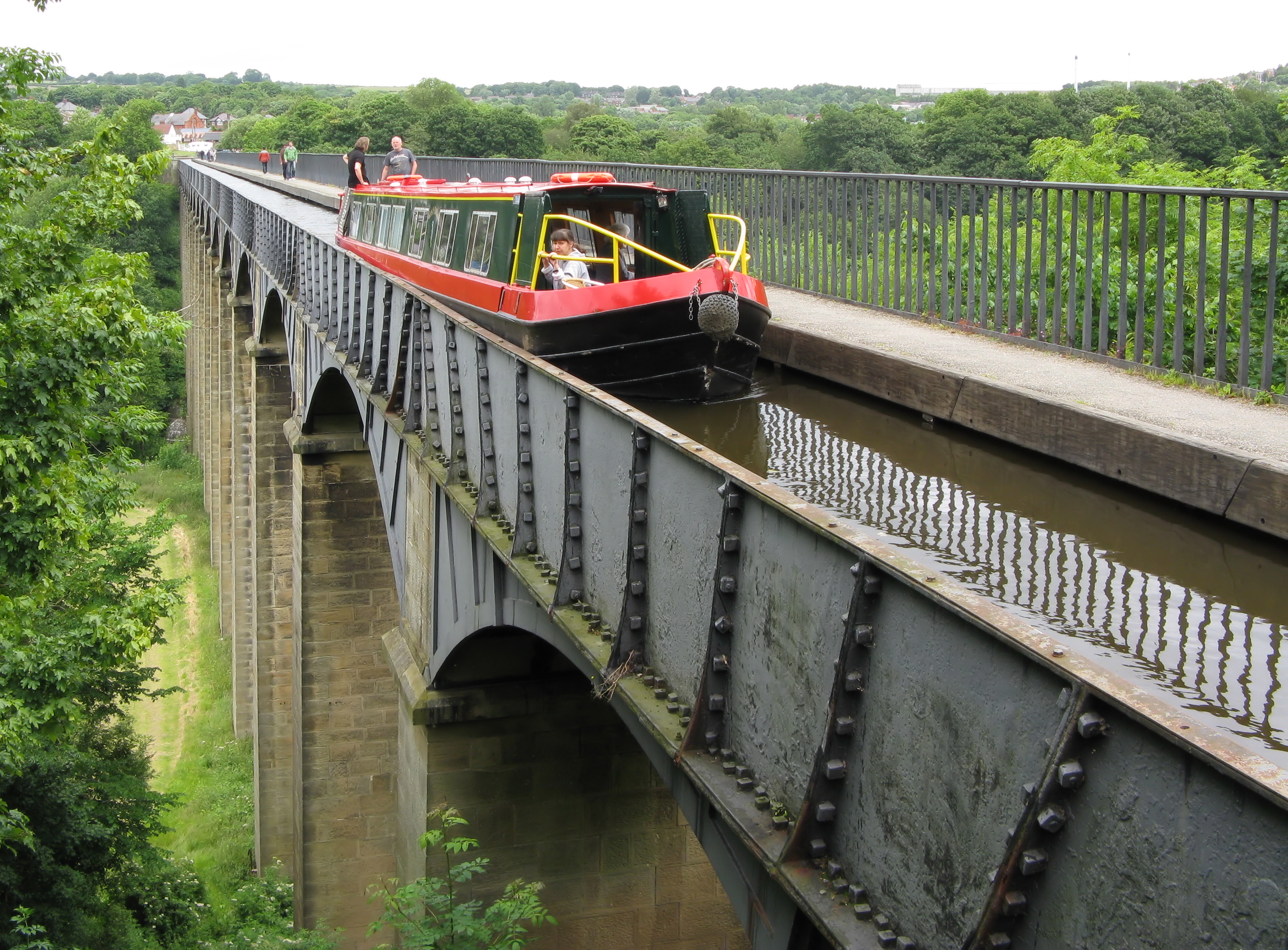
UNESCO World Heritage Site Pontcysyllte Aqueduct carrying the Llangollen Canal by civil engineers Thomas Telford and William Jessop in Wales, with a narrowboat crossing

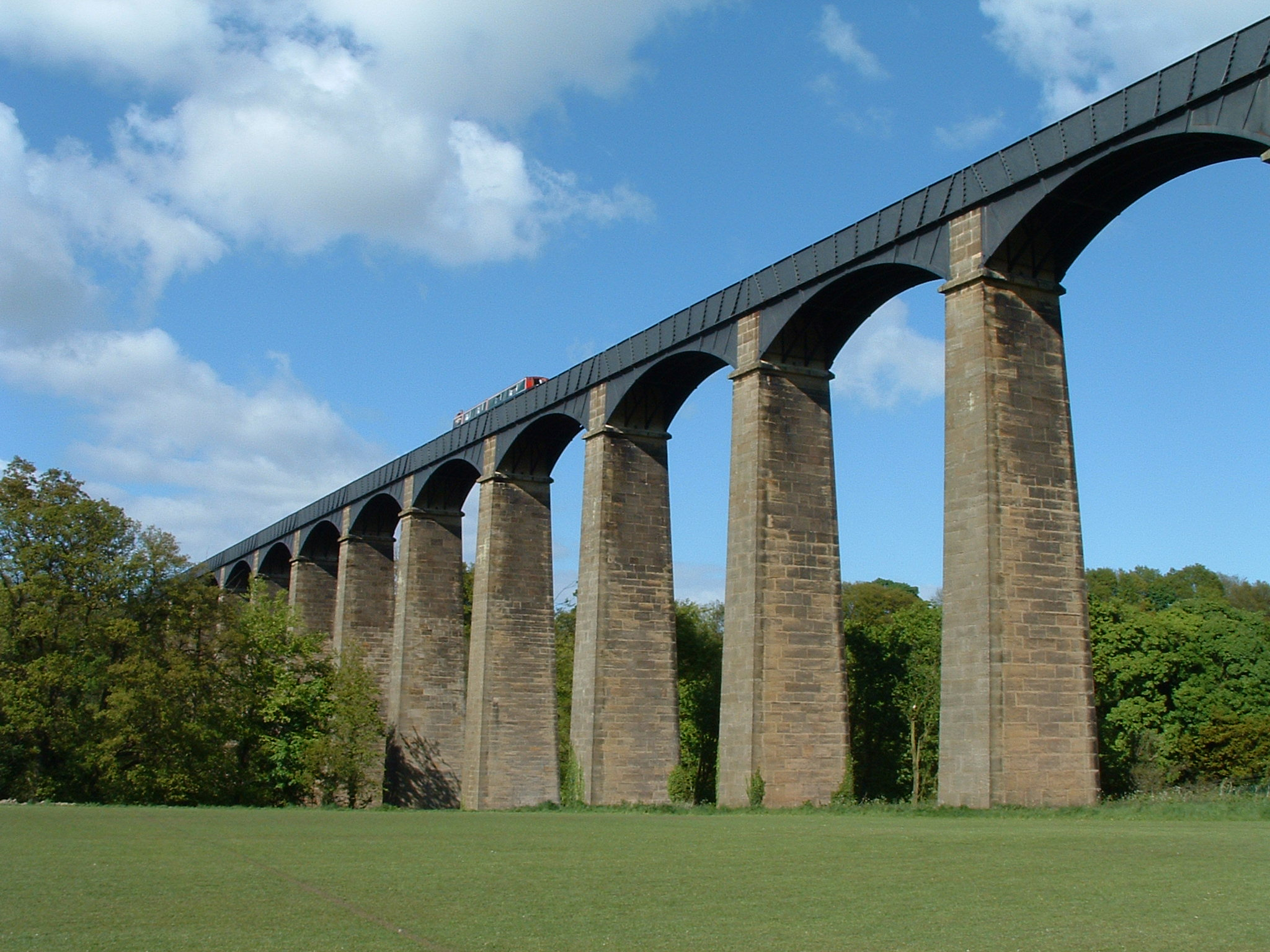
The Pontcysyllte Aqueduct over the River Dee viewed from the Vale of Llangollen, with a narrowboat crossing

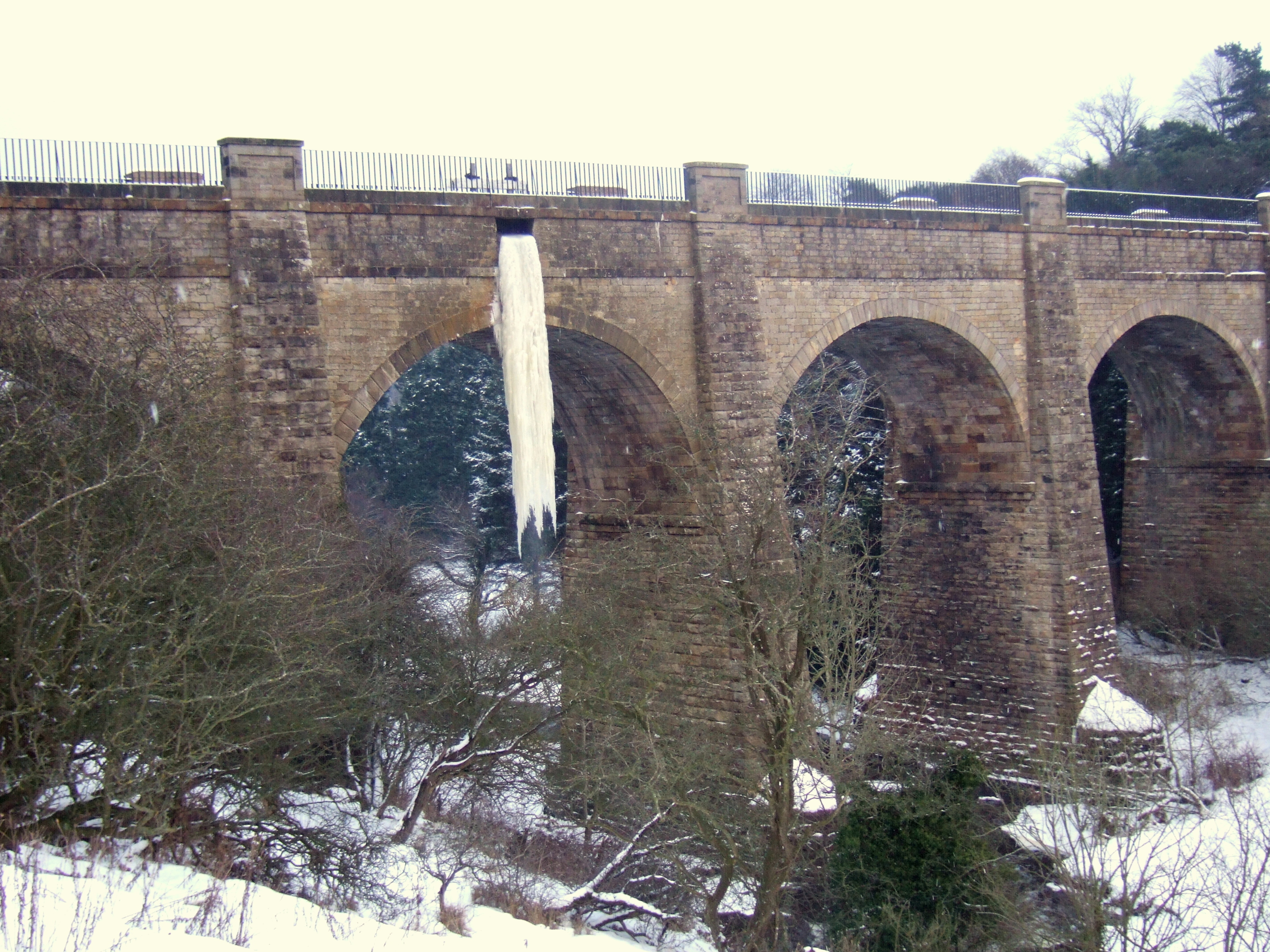
The Almond Aqueduct carrying the Edinburgh and Glasgow Union Canal over River Almond at Ratho with a frozen overflow channel during the big freeze of 2010

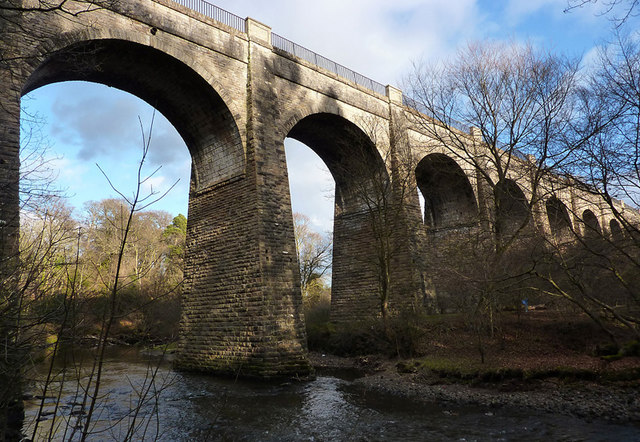
The Avon Aqueduct carrying the Edinburgh and Glasgow Union Canal over the Avon near Linlithgow

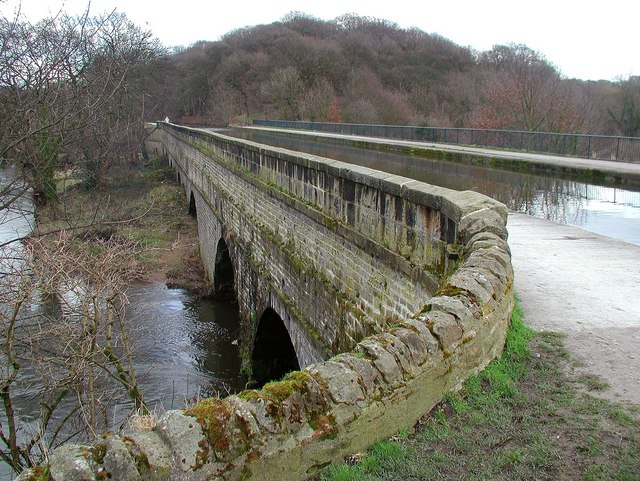
The Dowley Gap or the Seven Arches Aqueduct by the civil engineer James Brindley carrying the Leeds and Liverpool Canal over the River Aire, Yorkshire

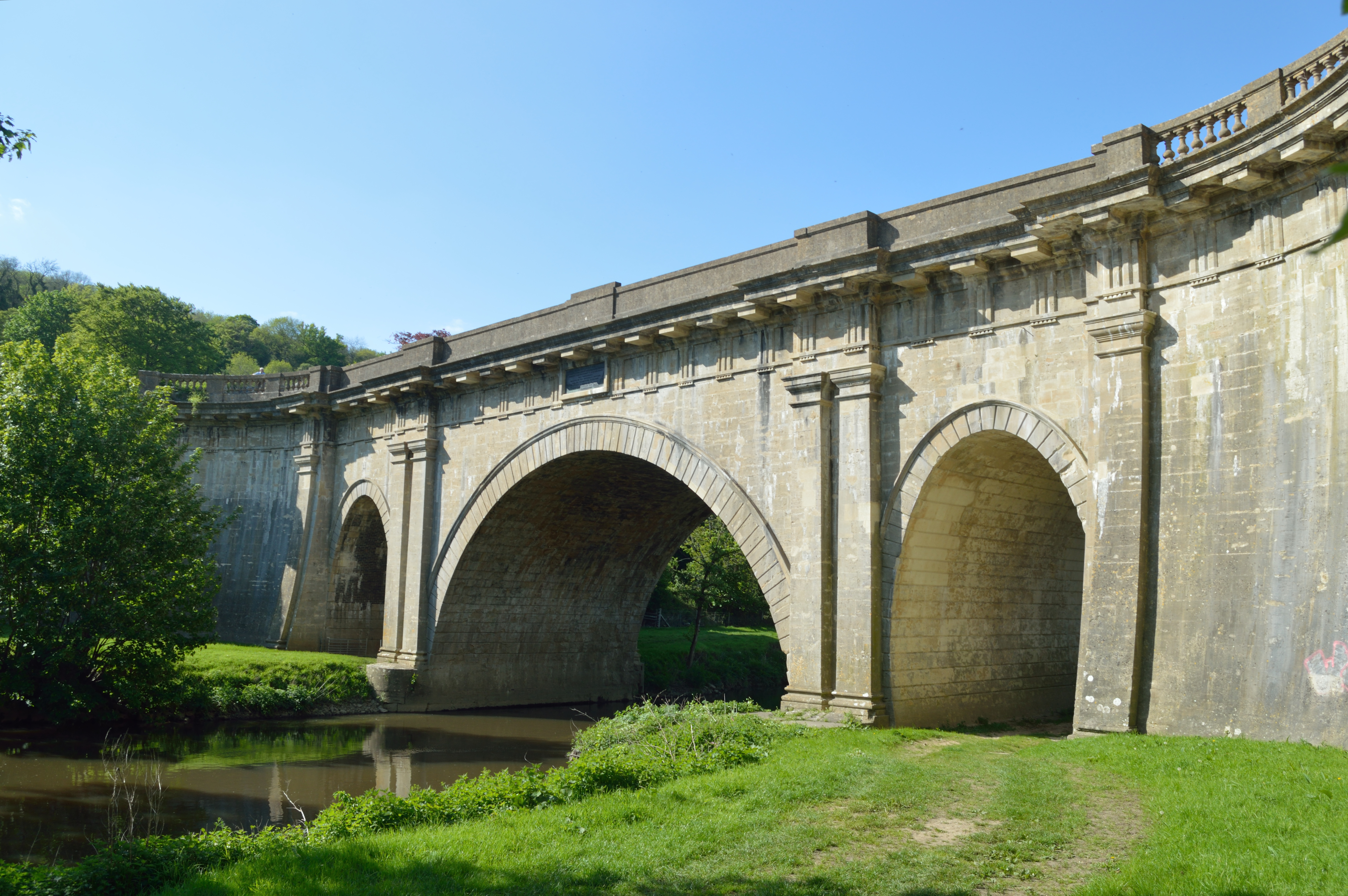
The Dundas Aqueduct in Bath Stone by the civil engineer John Rennie carrying the Kennet and Avon Canal over the River Avon and the Wessex Main Line railway at Limpley Stoke, near Bath, England

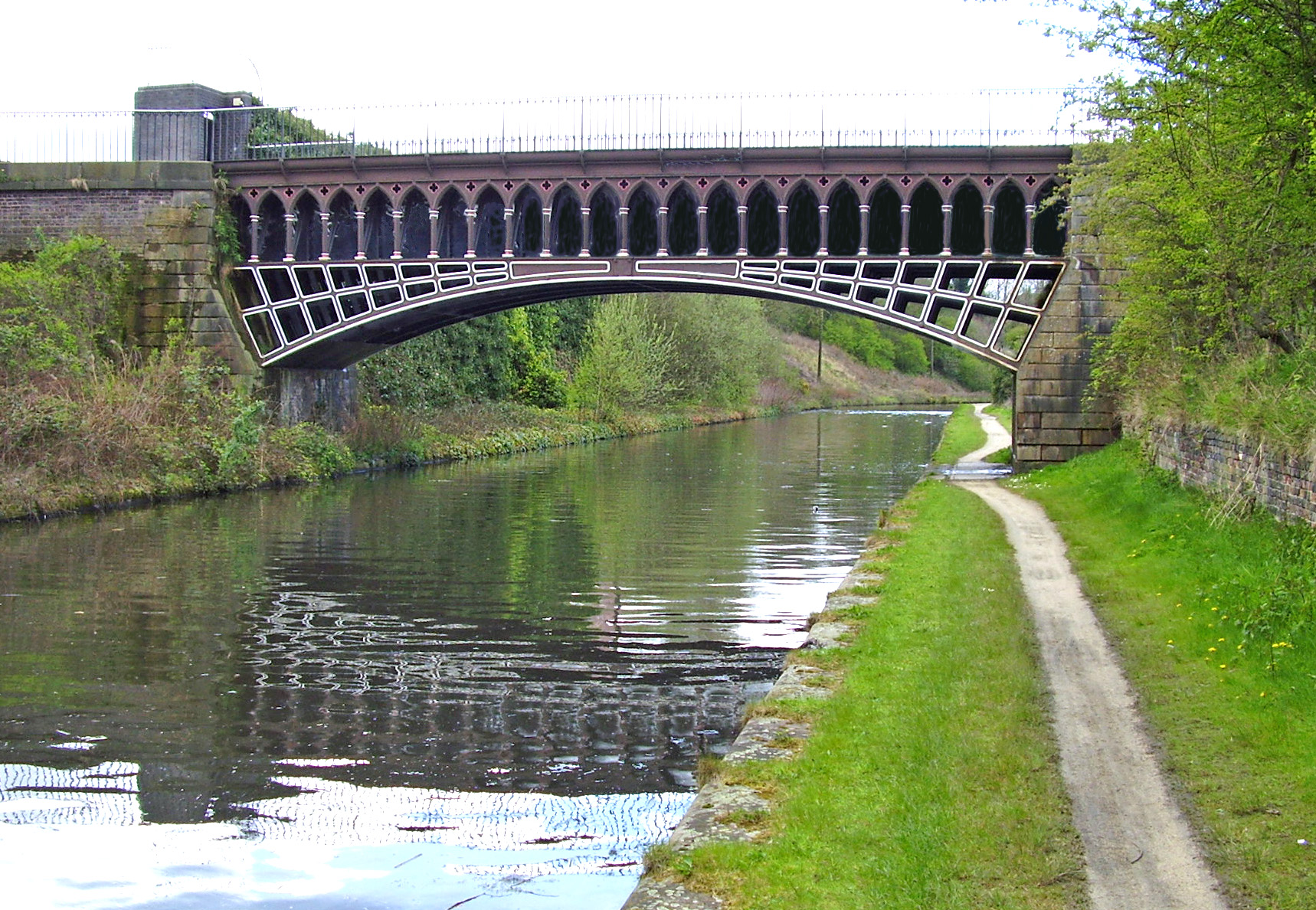
The Engine Arm Aqueduct, by the civil engineer Thomas Telford and cast by Horseley Ironworks, carrying the Engine Arm, a Birmingham Canal Navigations feeder, over the BCN Main Line

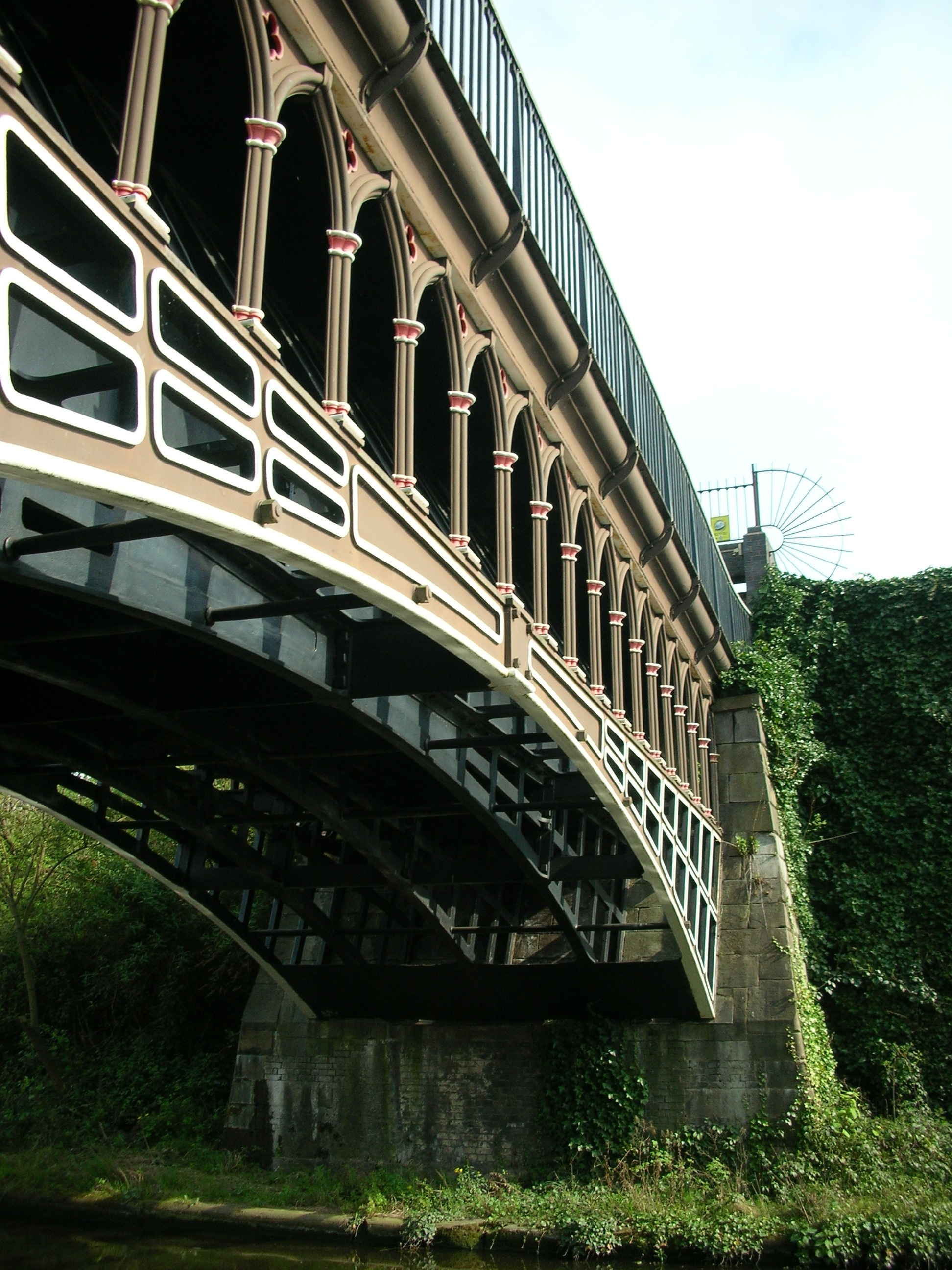
The Engine Arm Aqueduct close-up image showing the arch from below

In some locations, it is necessary to span a wide gap at a relatively high elevation, such as when a canal or water supply must span a valley. Rather than building extremely large arches or very tall supporting columns (difficult to construct in stone), a series of arched structures is built one atop another, with wider structures at the base. Roman civil engineers developed the design and constructed highly refined structures using only simple materials, equipment, and mathematics. This type is still used in canal viaducts and roadways because of its pleasing shape, particularly when spanning water, as the reflections of the arches create the visual impression of circles or ellipses.

=== Deck arch bridge ===
Deck arch bridges

Diagram of a Roman segmental arch of a stone deck arch bridge with a closed spandrel
— Bridge at Limyra

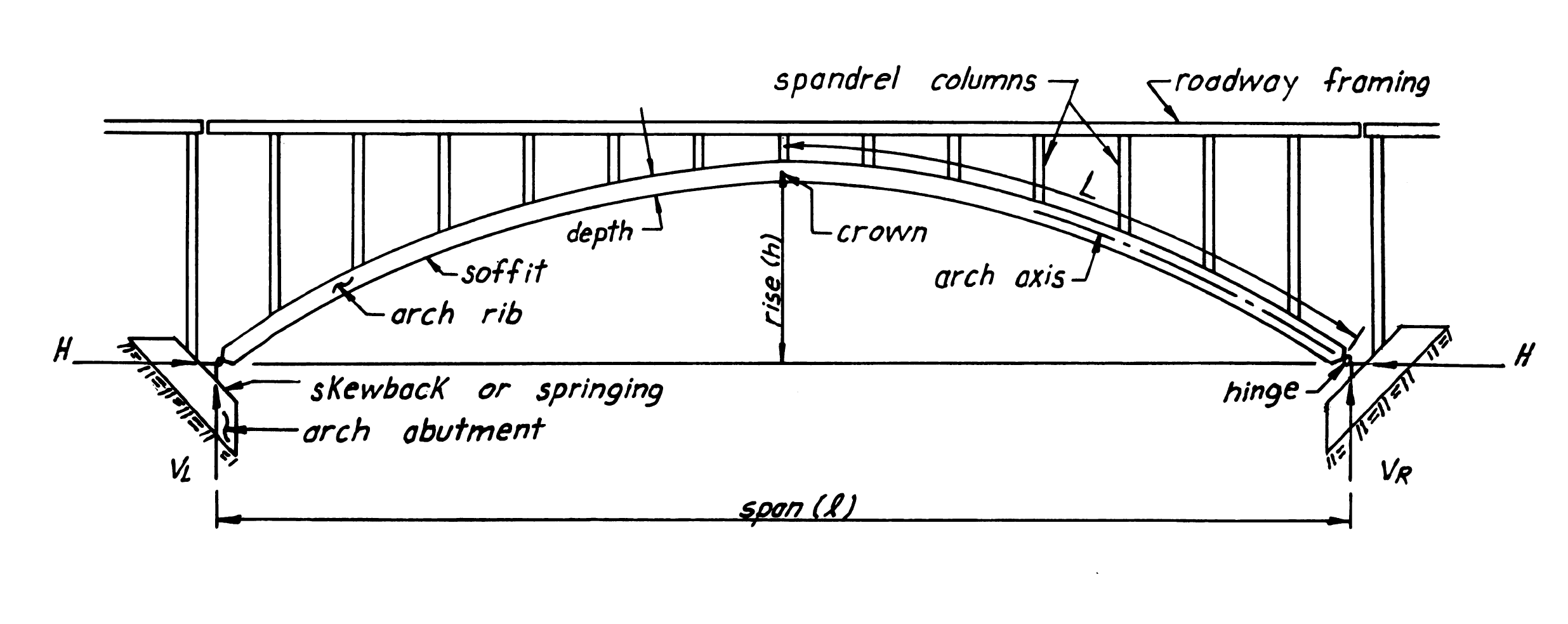
Diagram of an open-spandrel deck arch bridge

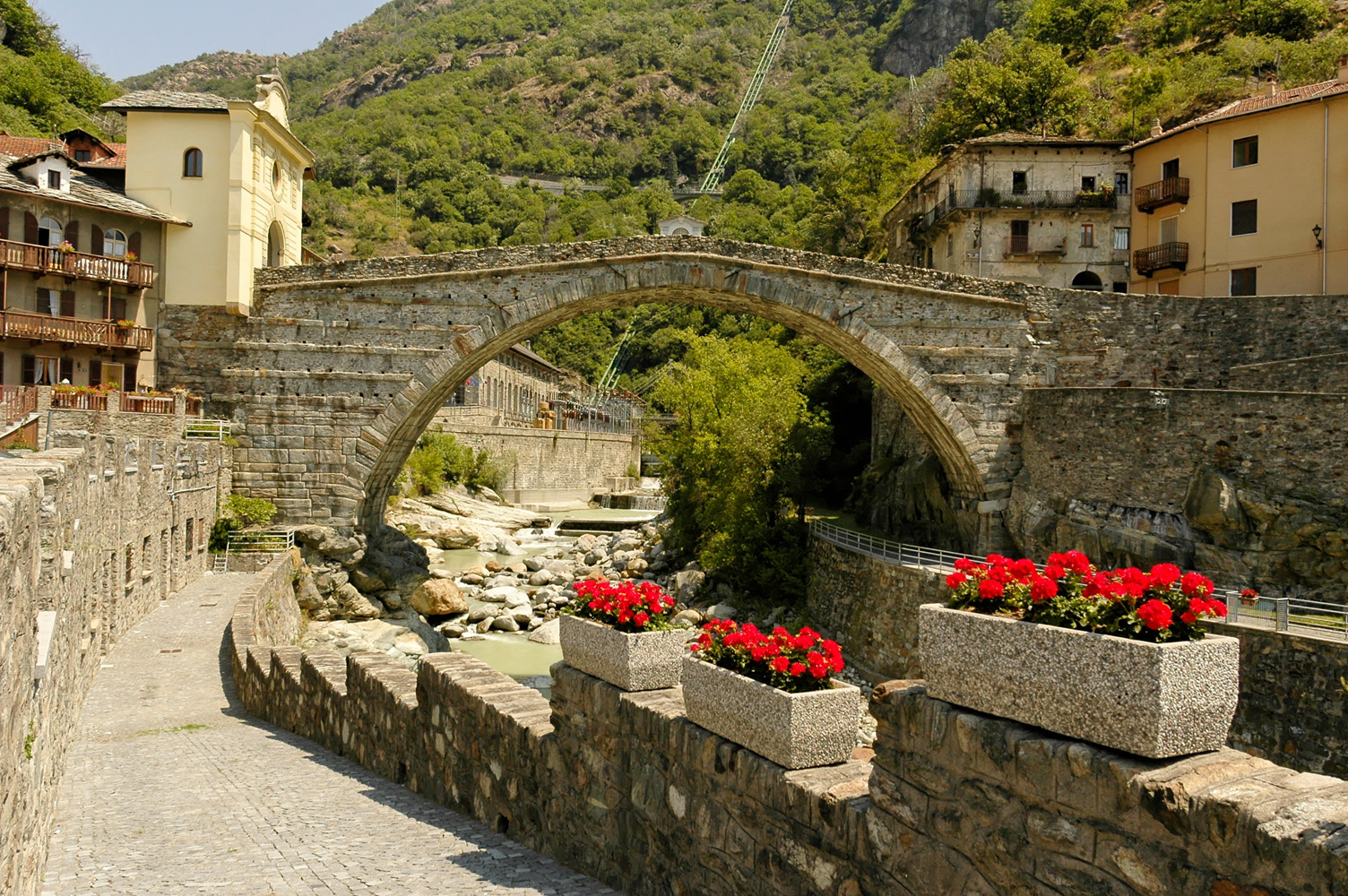
Roman Pont-Saint-Martin

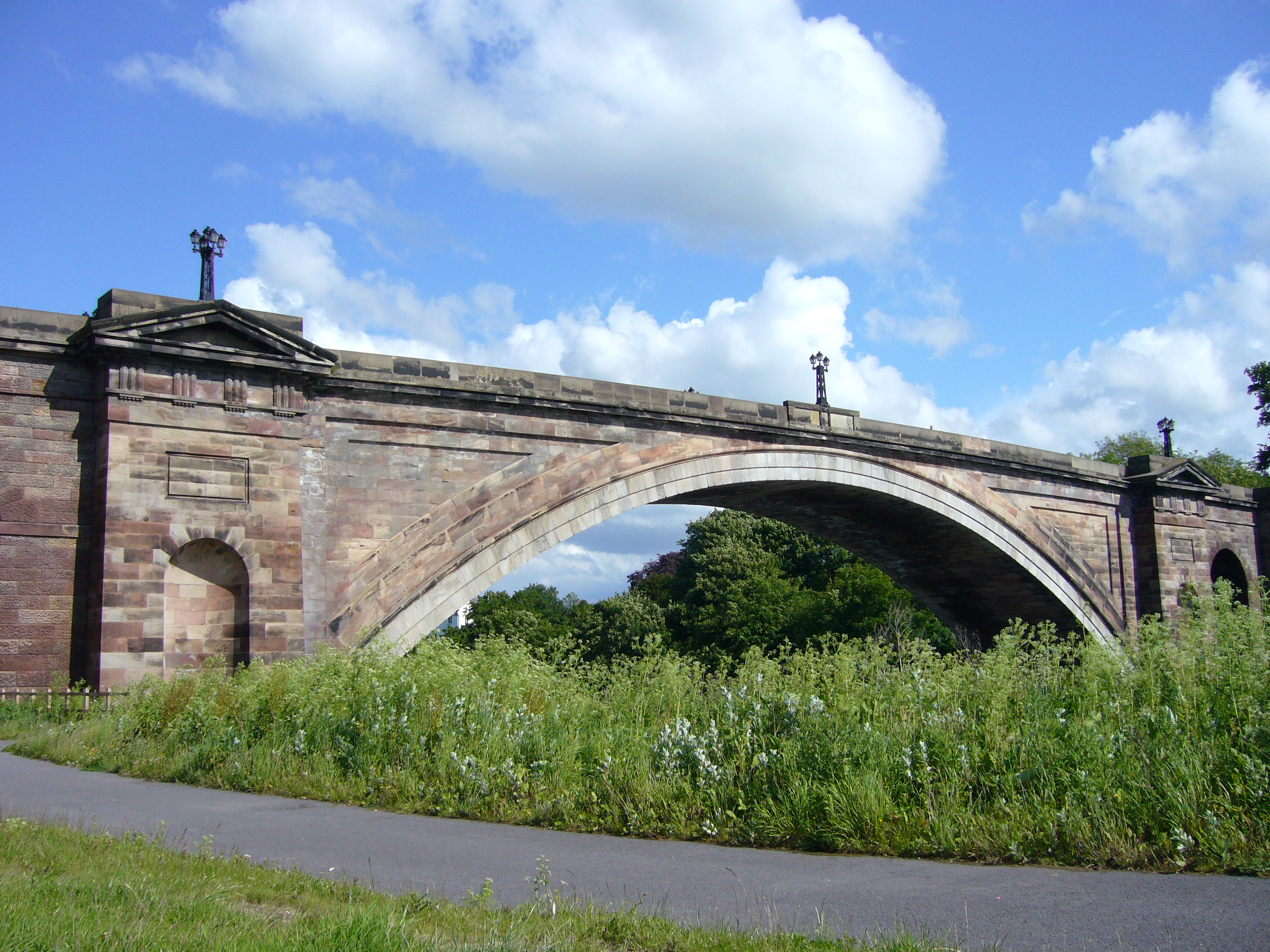
Grosvenor Bridge (Chester), a closed-spandrel arch bridge

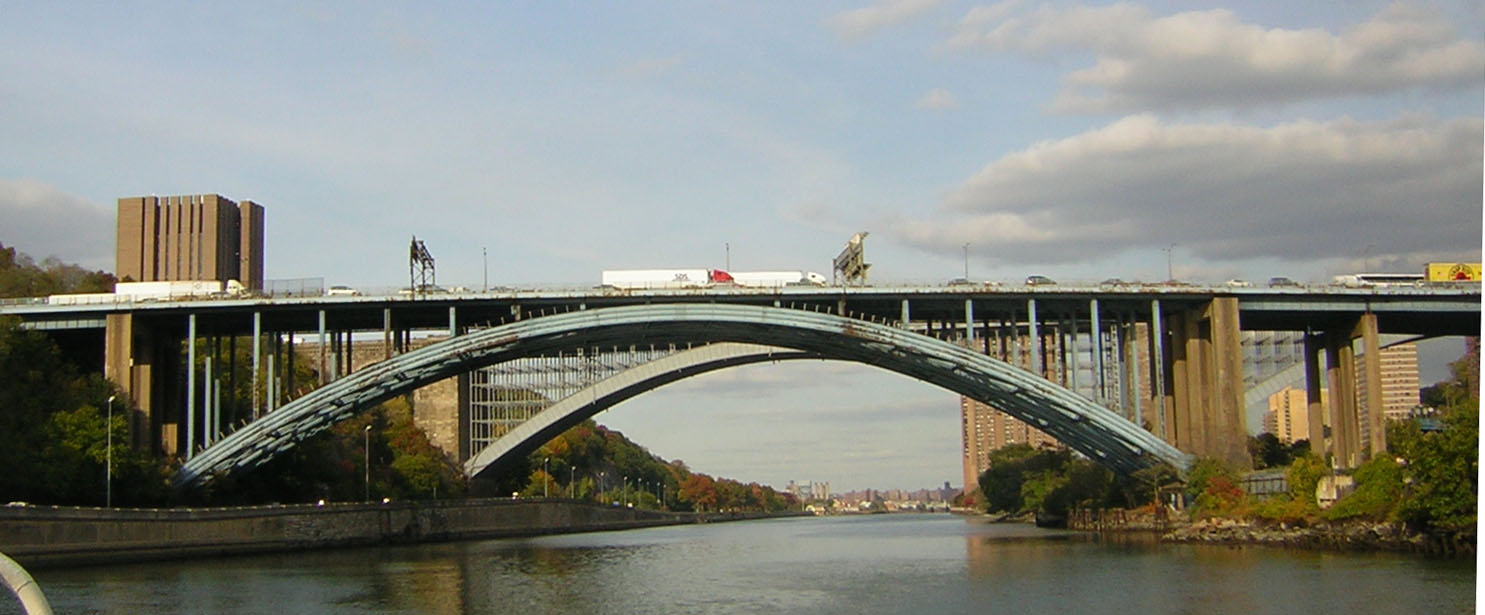
Alexander Hamilton Bridge, an open-spandrel arch bridge

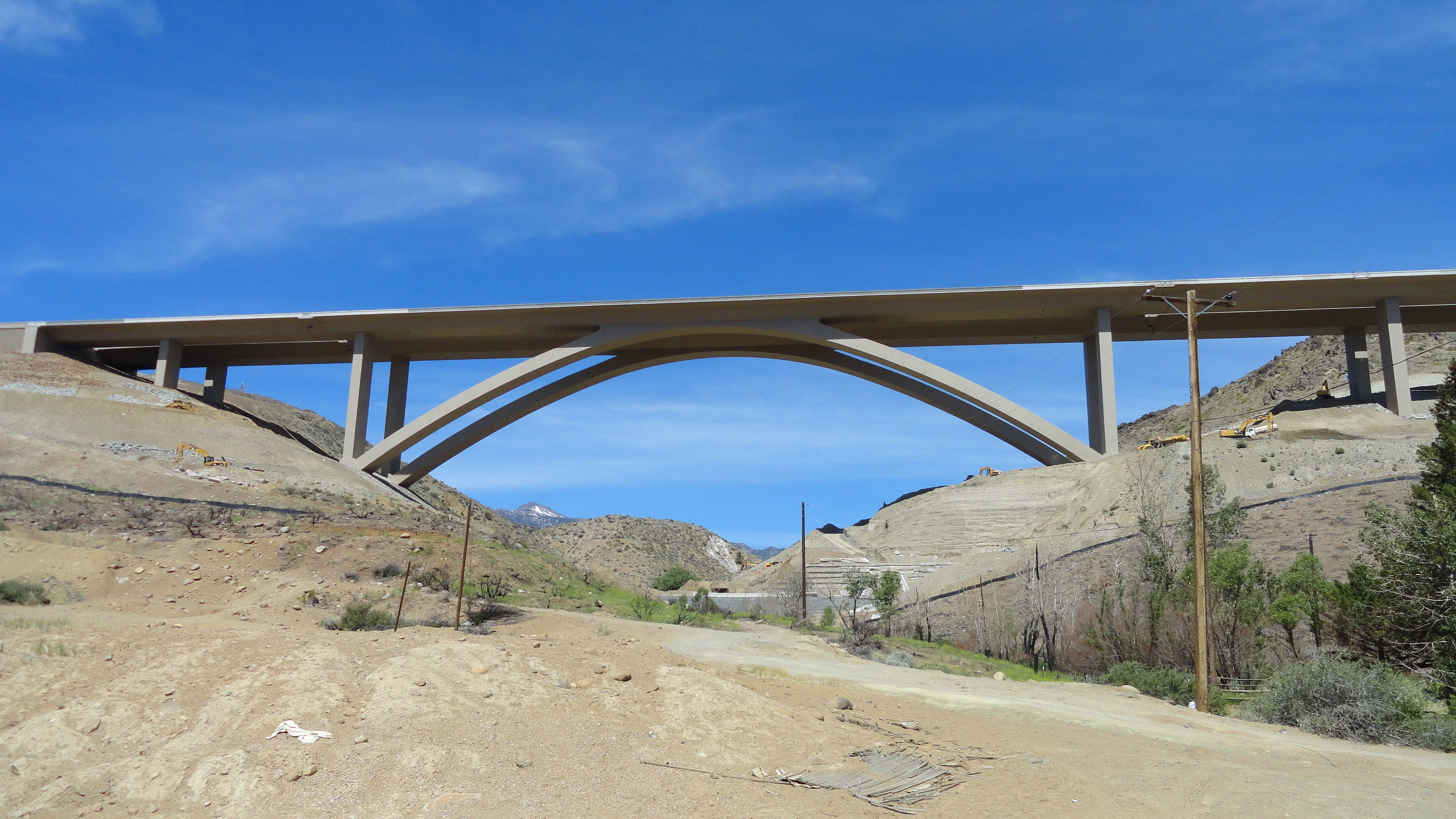
Galena Creek Bridge, a cathedral arch bridge

This type of bridge features an arch with the deck entirely above it. The area between the arch and the deck is known as the spandrel. If the spandrel is solid, usually the case in a masonry or stone arch bridge, the bridge is called a closed-spandrel deck arch bridge. If the deck is supported by several vertical columns rising from the arch, the bridge is known as an open-spandrel deck arch bridge. The Alexander Hamilton Bridge is an example of an open-spandrel arch bridge. Finally, if the arch supports the deck only at its top, the bridge is called a cathedral arch bridge.

=== Through arch bridge ===
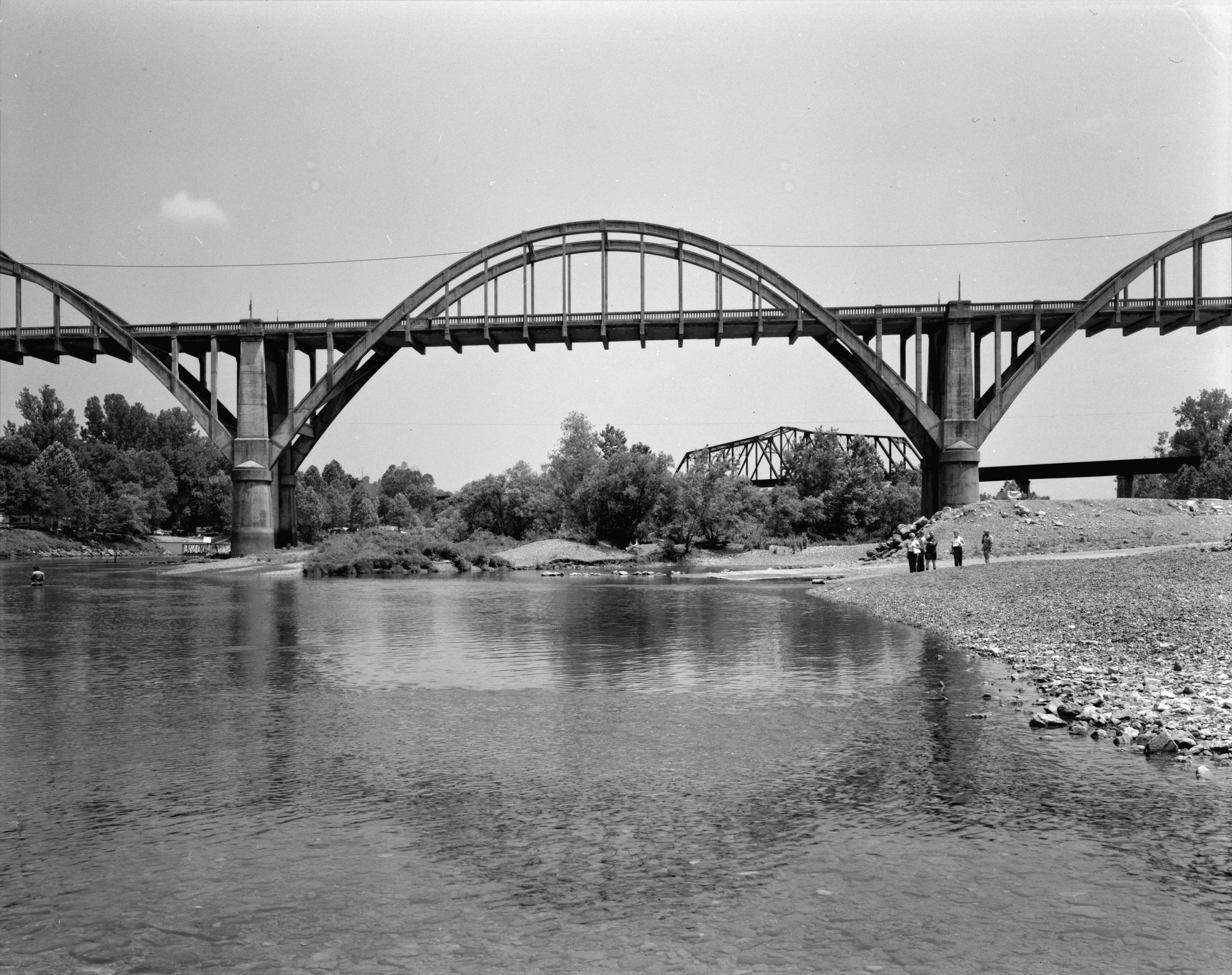
Cotter Bridge, a through arch bridge that has open spandrels

This type of bridge has an arch whose base is at or below the deck, but whose top rises above it, so the deck passes through the arch. The central part of the deck is supported by the arch via suspension cables or tie bars, as with a tied-arch bridge. The ends of the bridge may be supported from below, as with a deck arch bridge. Any part supported from the arch below may have spandrels that are closed or open.

The Sydney Harbour Bridge and the Bayonne Bridge are through arch bridges that use a truss-type arch.

=== Tied-arch bridge ===
Also known as a bowstring arch, this type of arch bridge incorporates a tie rod between the two ends of the arch. The tie is usually the deck and can withstand the horizontal thrust forces that would normally be exerted on an arch bridge's abutments.

The deck is suspended from the arch. The arch is in compression, in contrast to a suspension bridge, where the catenary arch is in tension. A tied-arch bridge can also be a through arch bridge.

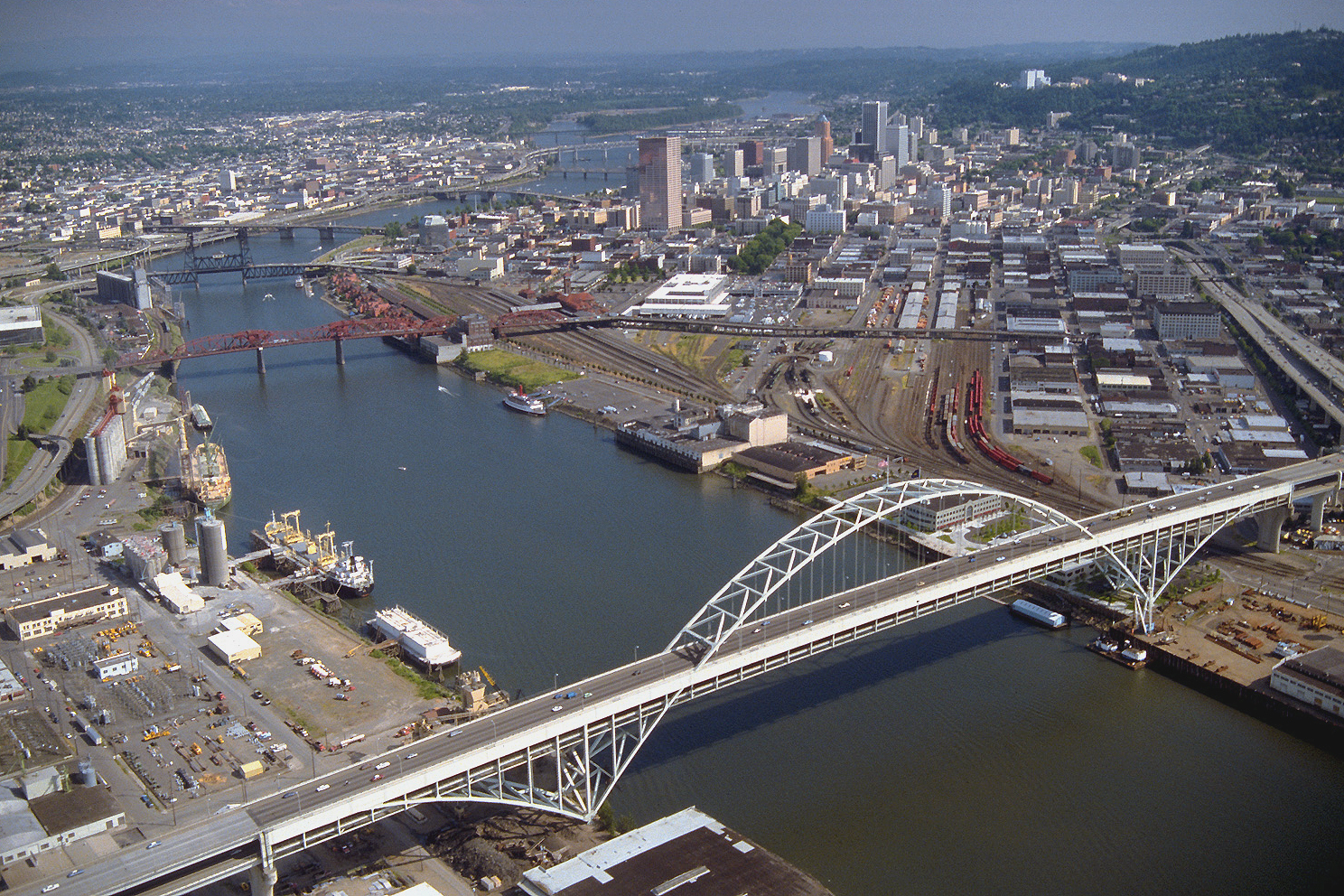
The deck of the Fremont Bridge goes through the arch, the central span is suspended from and ties the arch, while the side spans of the deck are supported.

=== Hinged arch bridge ===
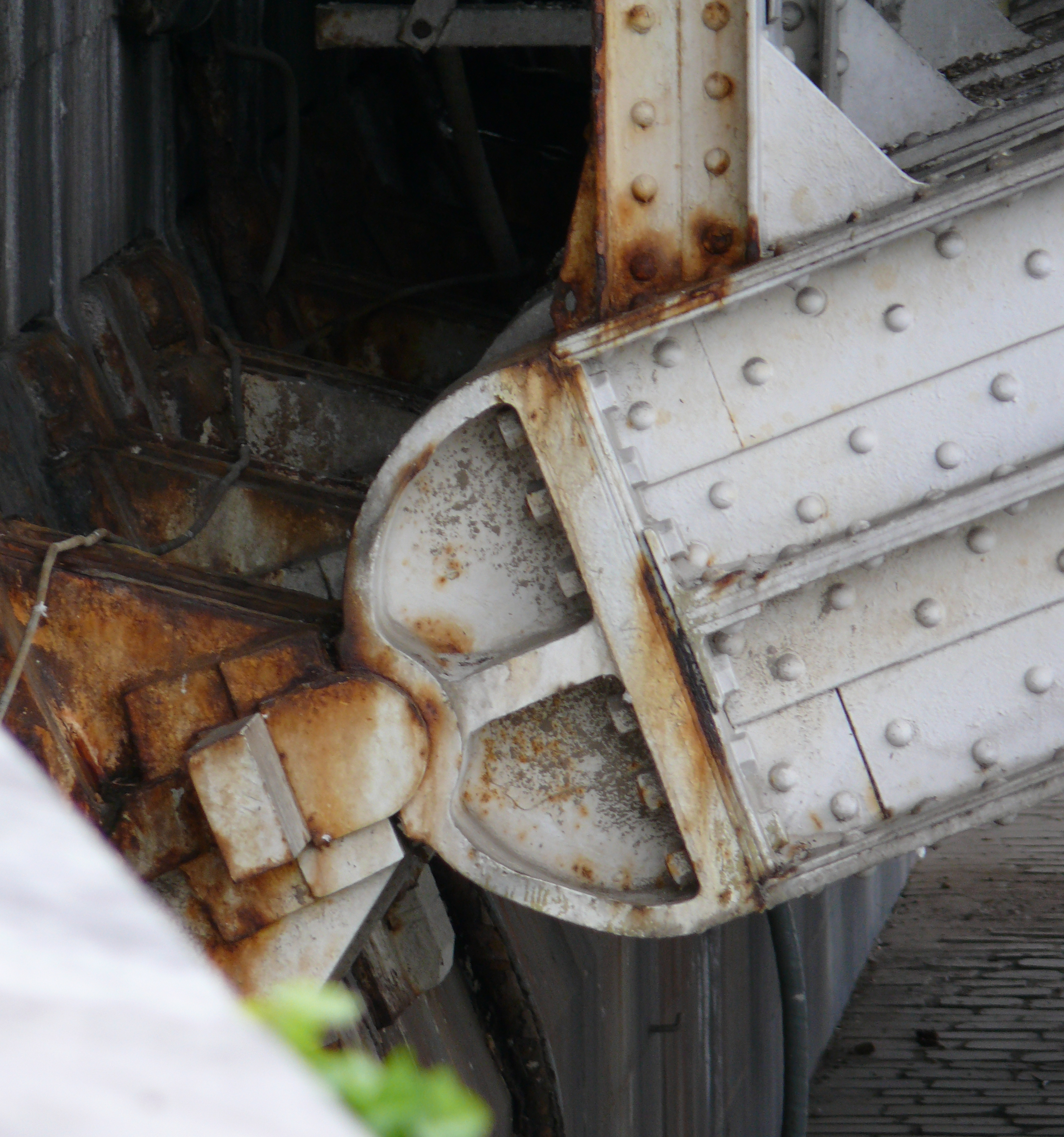
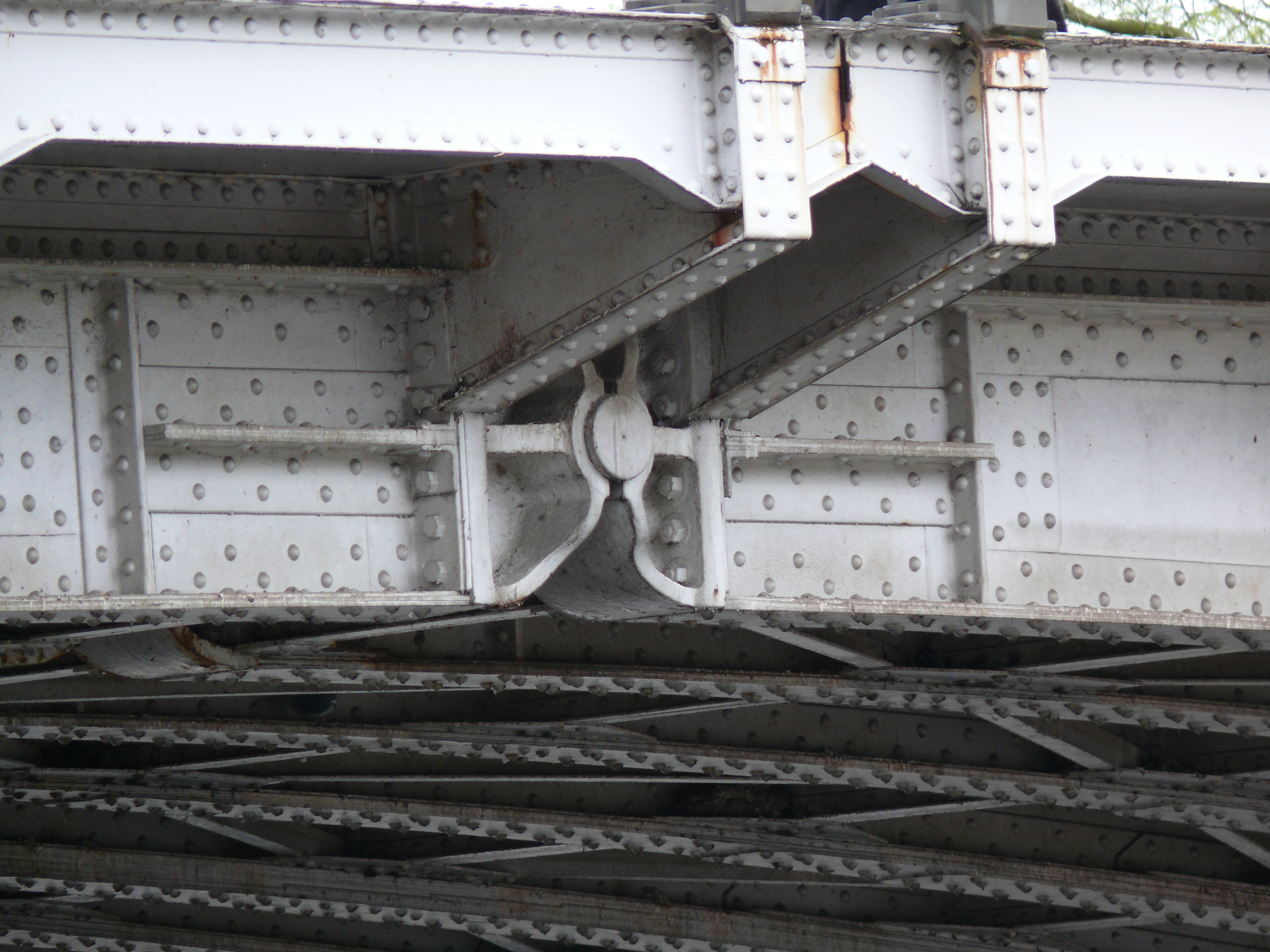
Springing point hinge (left) and crown hinge (right) on a three-hinged arch bridge in Namur, Belgium

An arch bridge with hinges incorporated to allow movement between structural elements. A single-hinged bridge has a hinge at the crown of the arch, a two-hinged bridge has hinges at both springing points and a three-hinged bridge has hinged in all three locations.

== Gallery ==
Different types of arch bridges

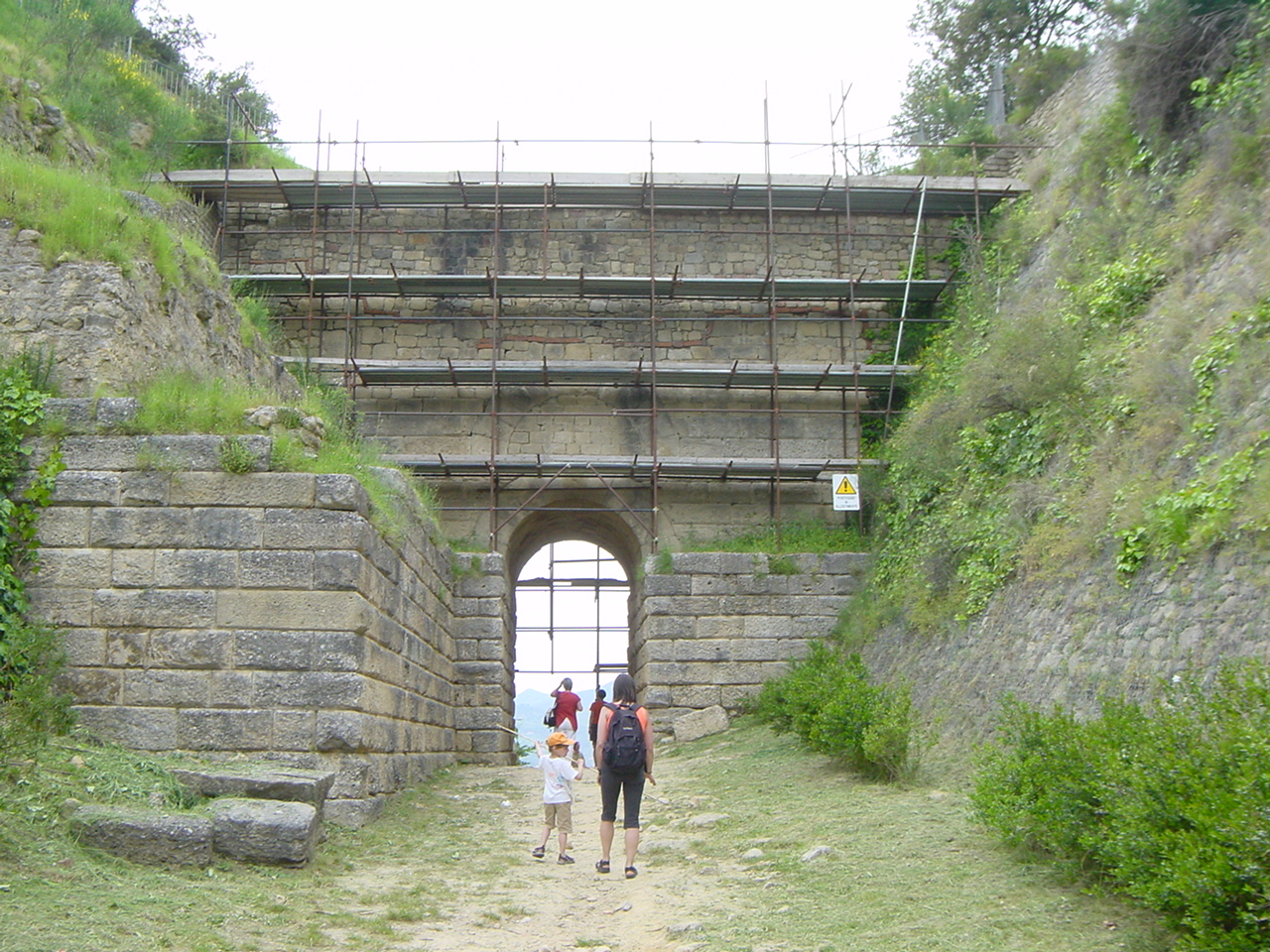
The dry stone bridge, so called Porta Rosa (4th century BC), in Elea, Province of Salerno, Campania, Italy

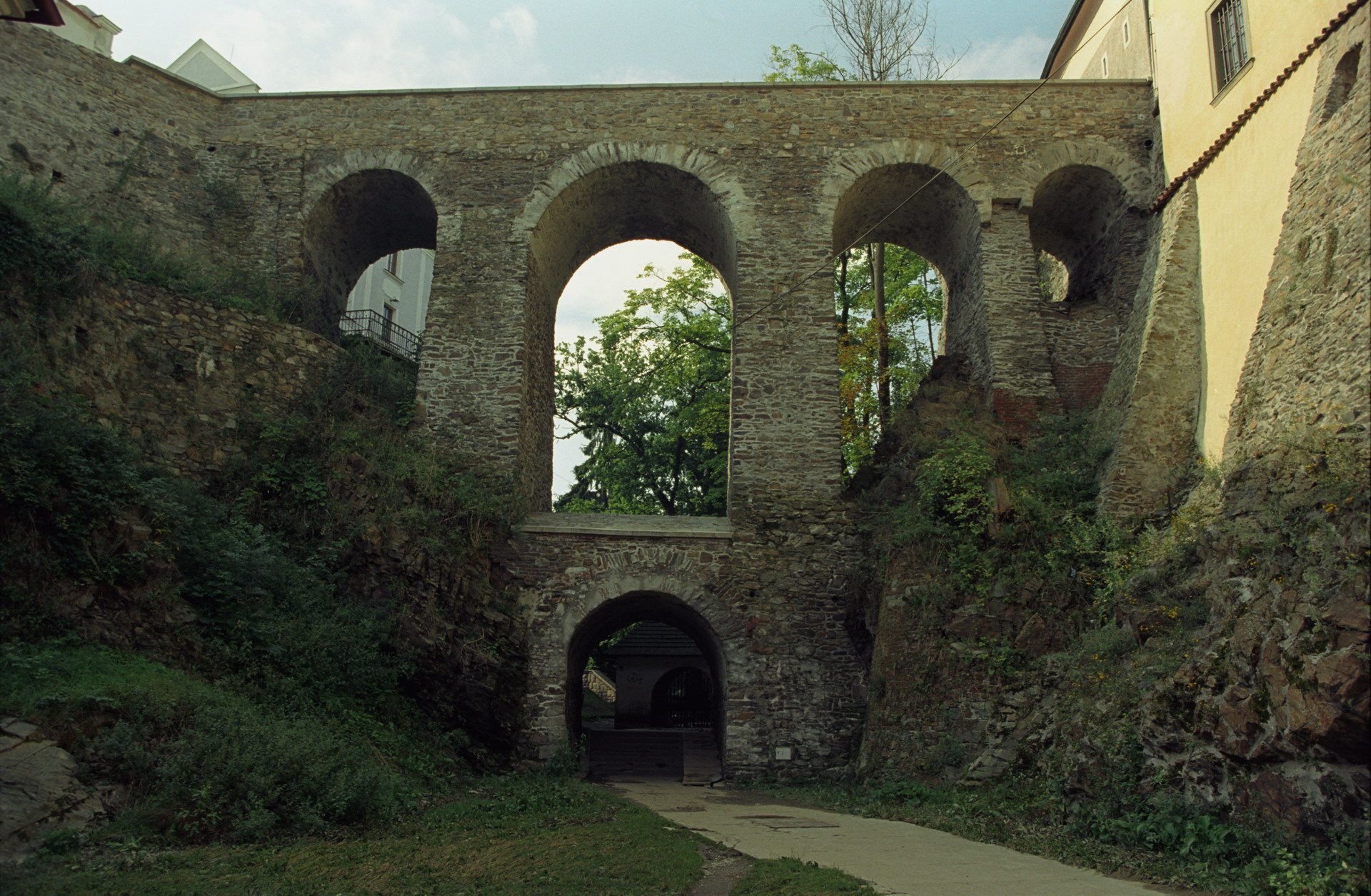
Bridge in Český Krumlov, the Czech Republic

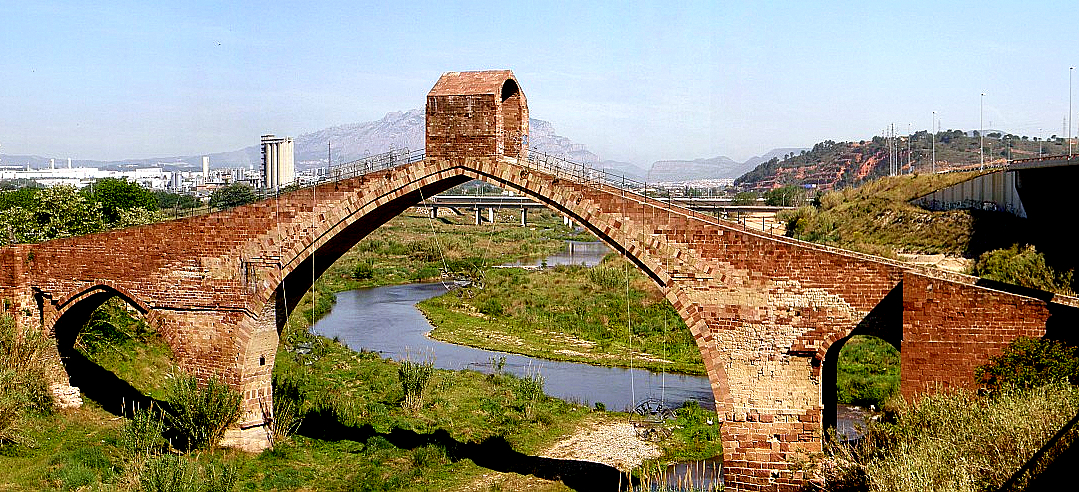
Pointed arch of the Spanish Sant Bartomeu Bridge or Puente del Diablo (1282) — one of many Devil's bridges, mainly found around Europe

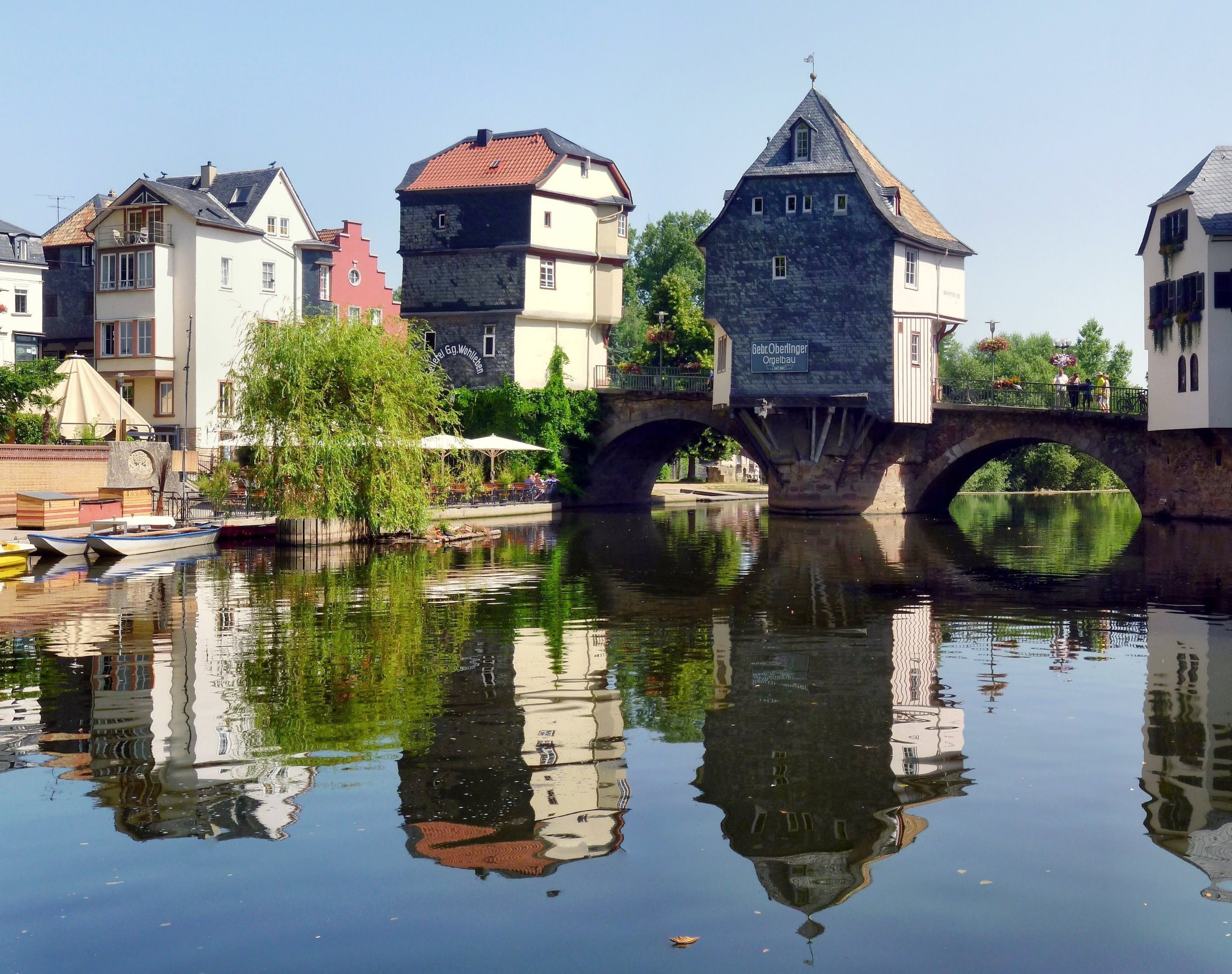
Alte Nahebrücke (c. 1300) supports buildings on its piers

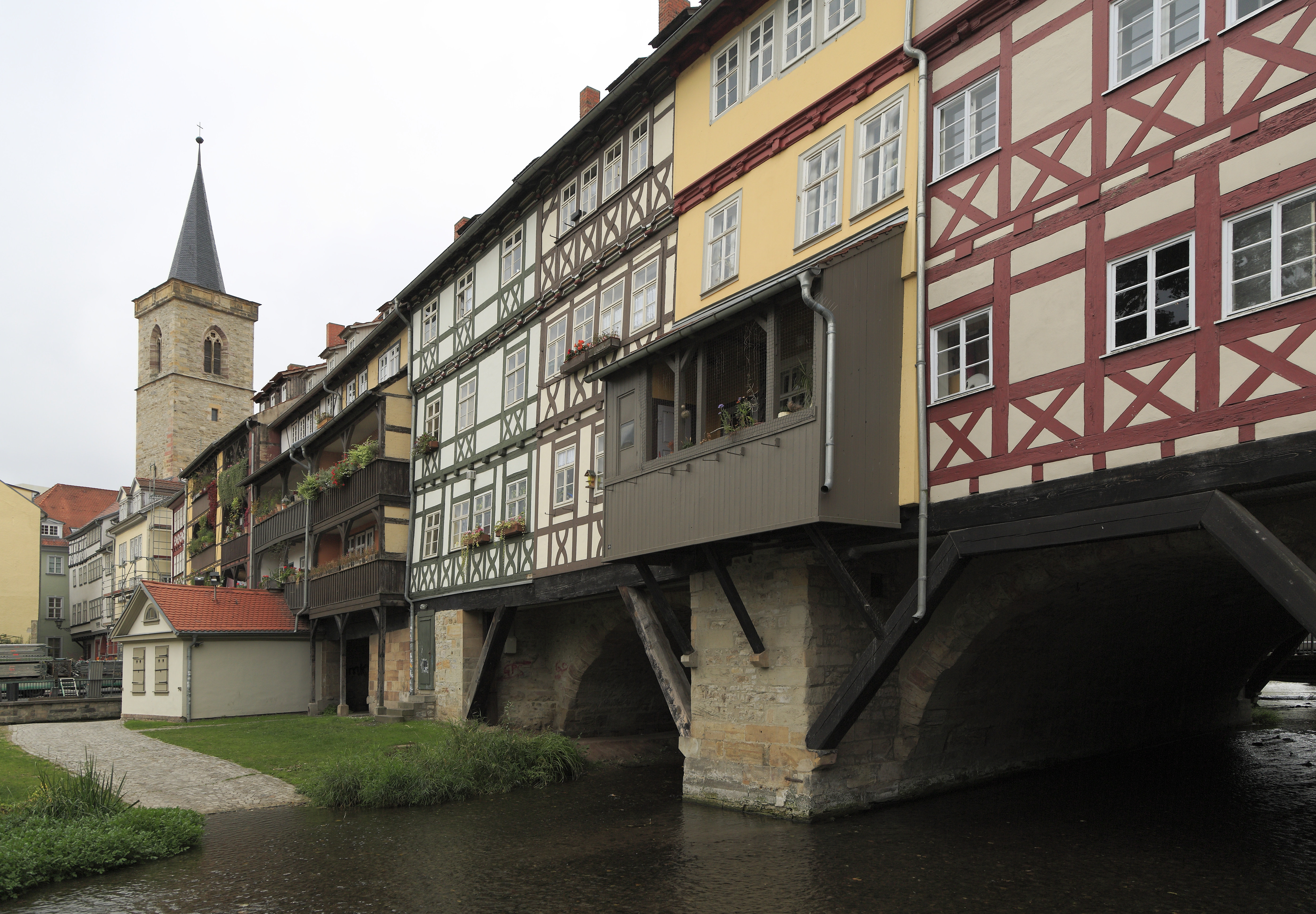
Krämerbrücke (1325) – longest continuously inhabited bridge in Europe.

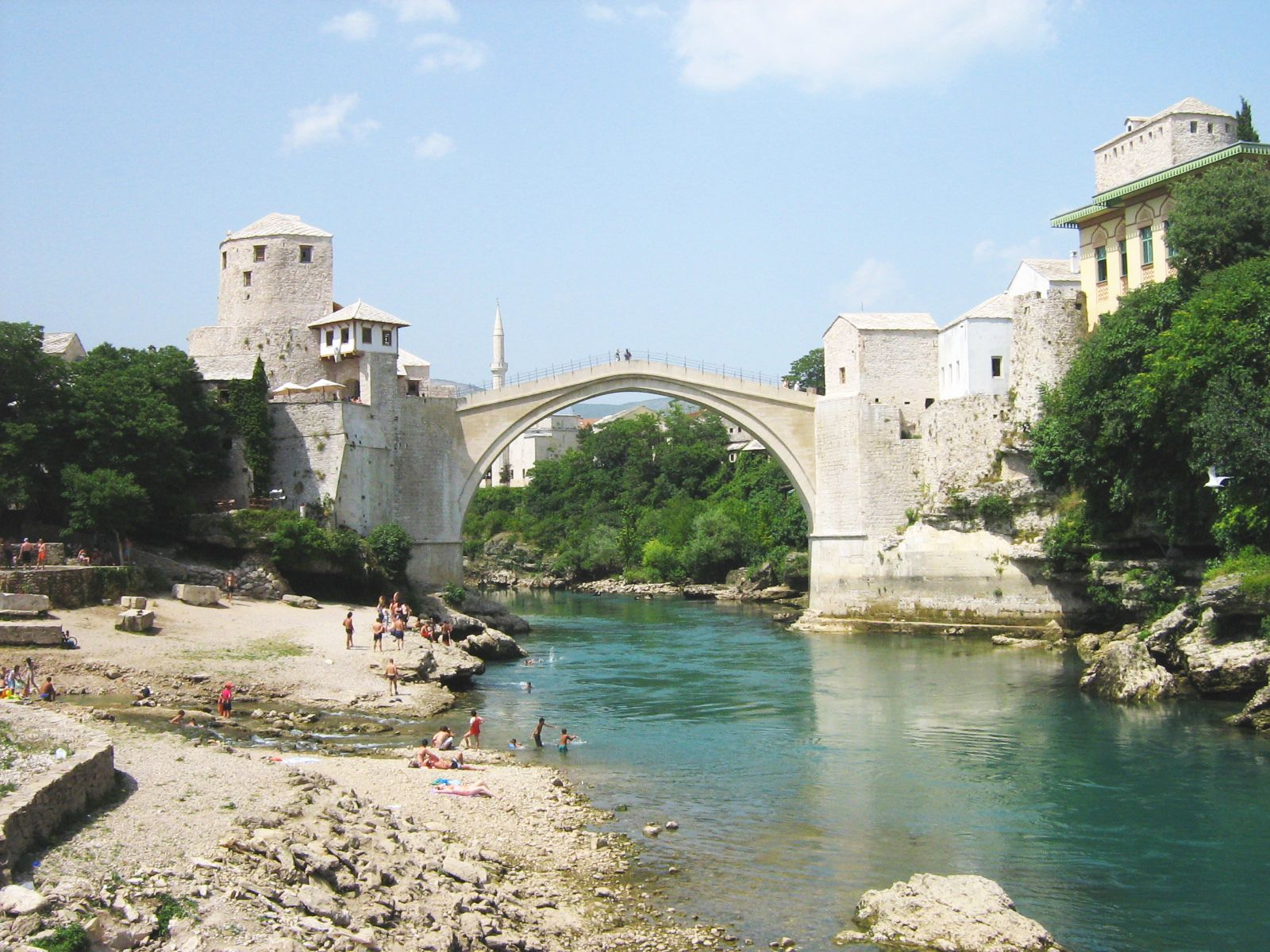
Ottoman 16th-century single-arch bridge Stari most over the River Neretva in Mostar in Bosnia and Herzegovina

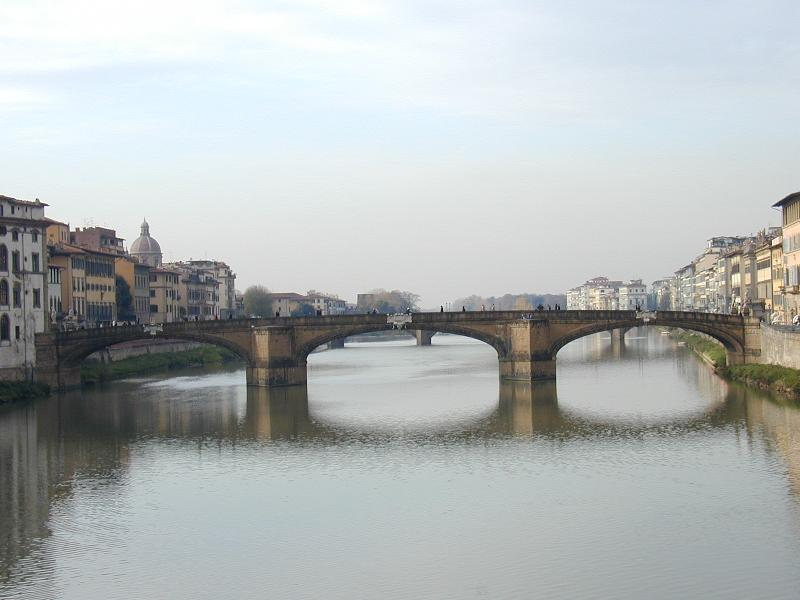
Ponte Santa Trinita (1569) — the first bridge with elliptic arches

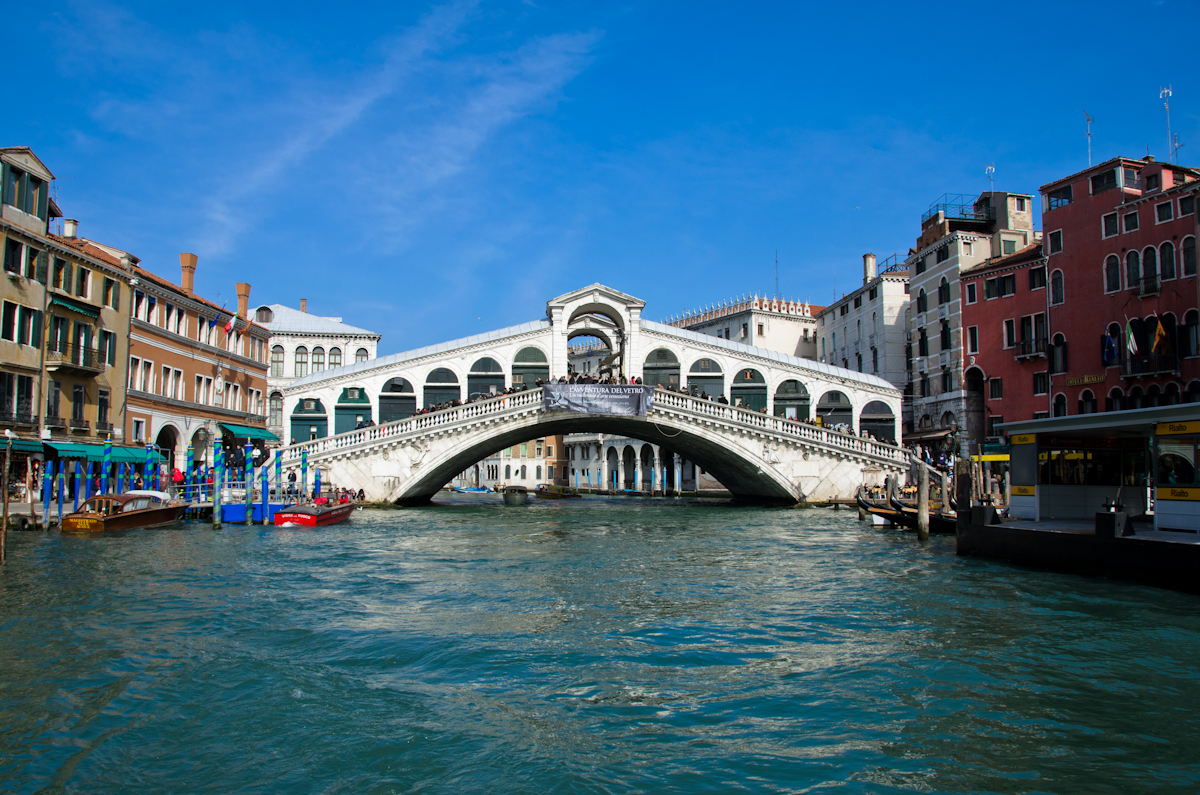
Rialto Bridge (1591) over the Grand Canal in Venice, Italy

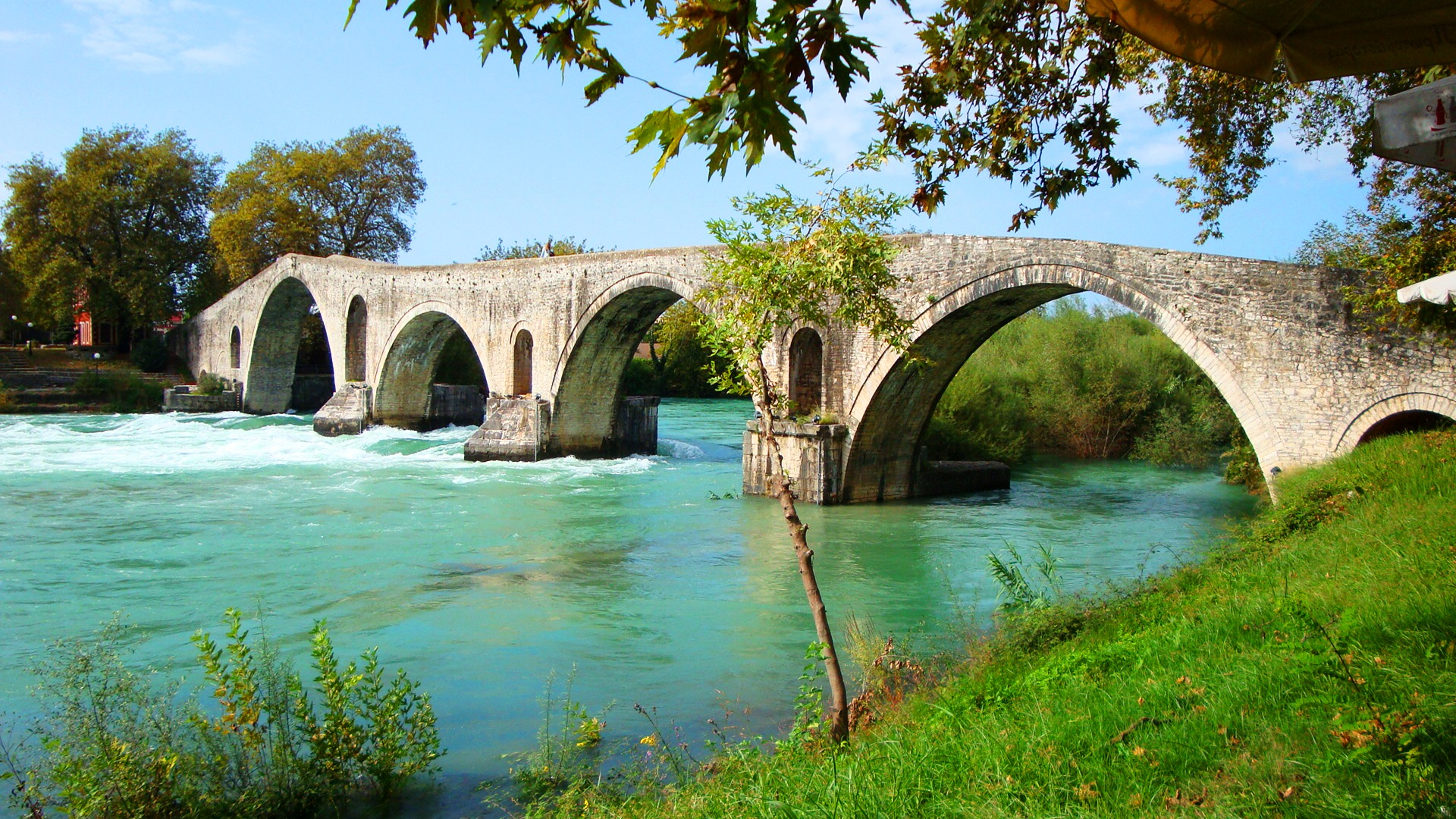
Bridge of Arta in Arta, Greece — a 17th-century Ottoman reconstruction of an ancient Roman bridge

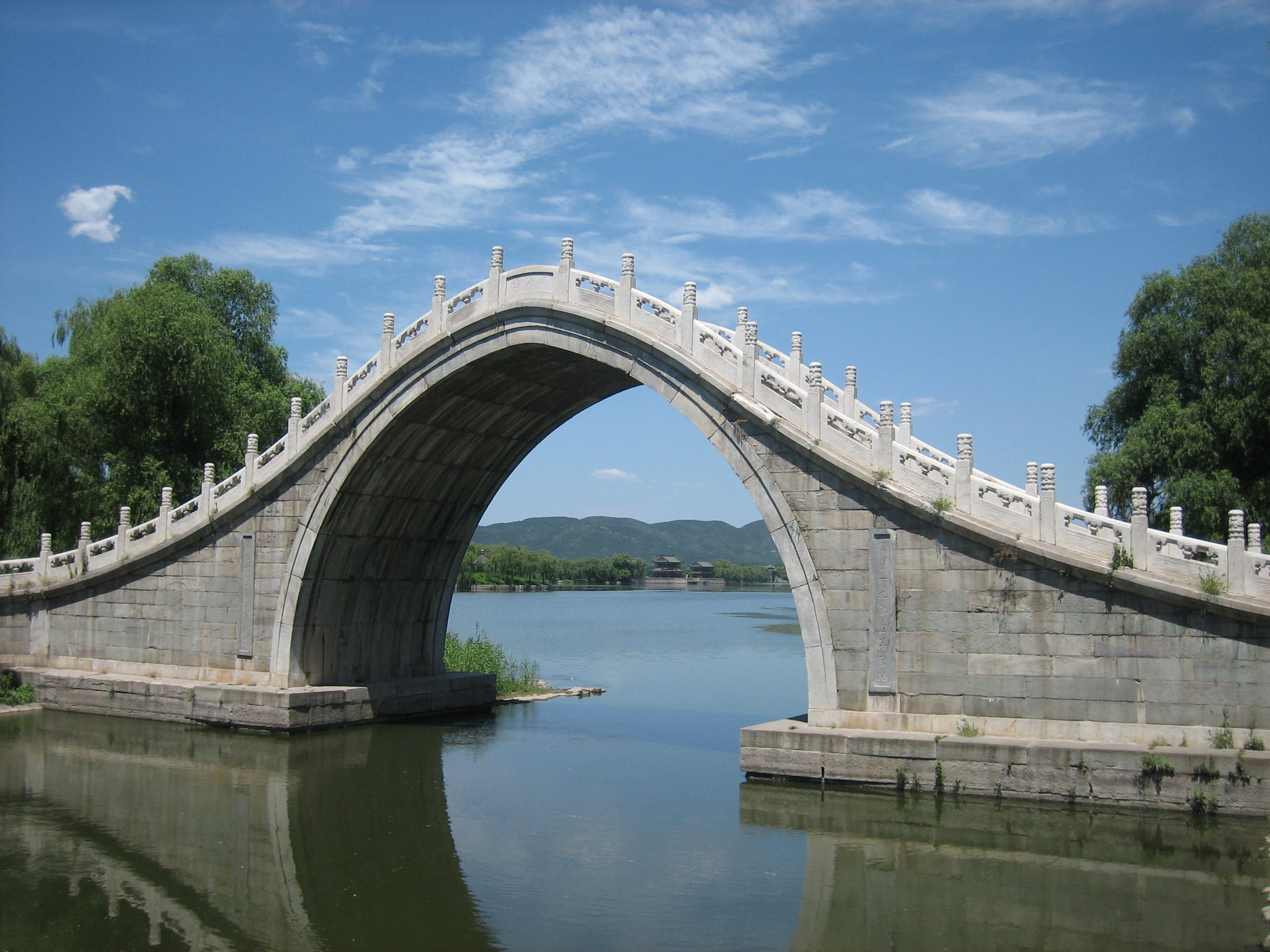
A masonry moon bridge showing the buttressing approach ramps that take the horizontal thrust of the arch

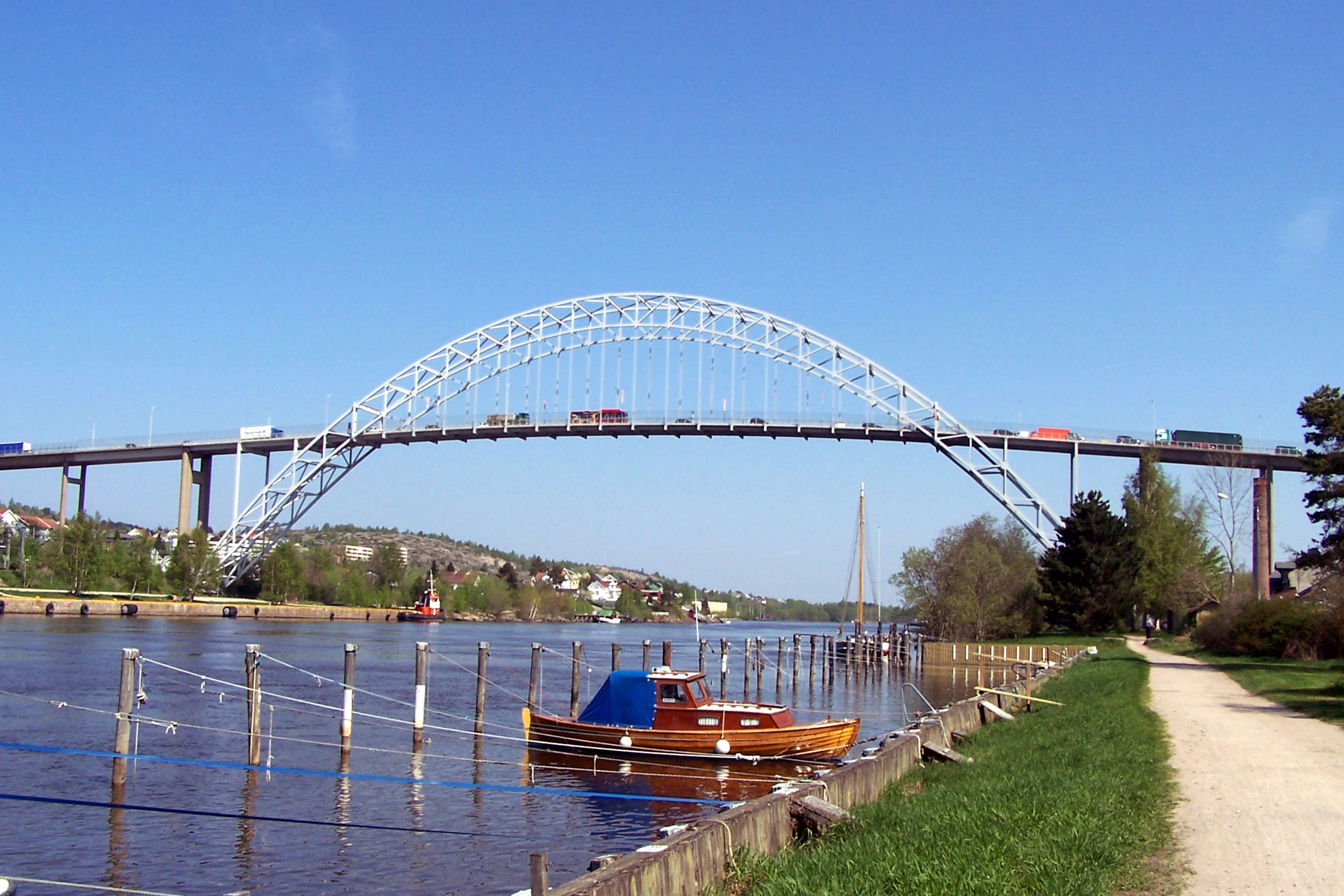
Fredrikstad bridge in Fredrikstad, Norway

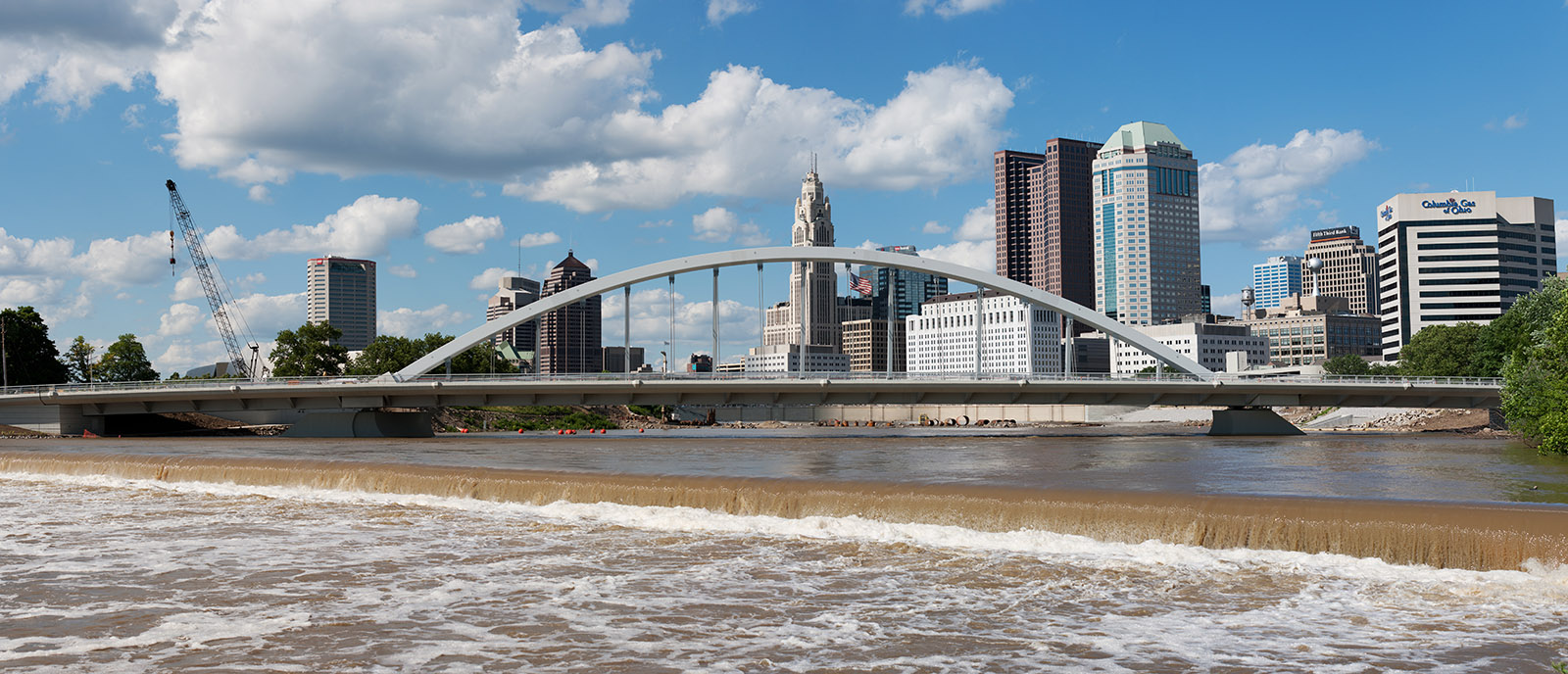
The Main Street Bridge in Columbus, OH is the only inclined-arch suspension bridge in North America.

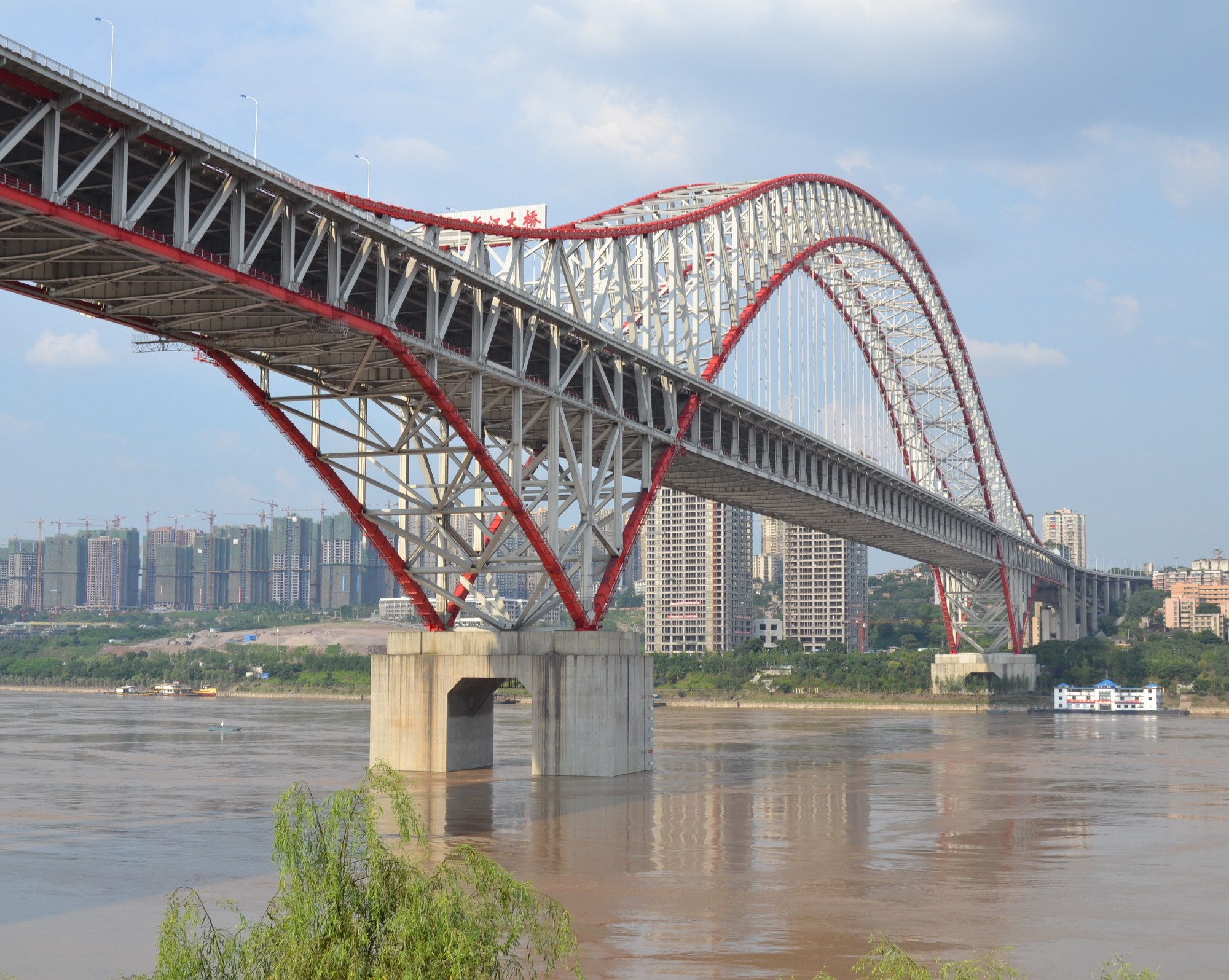
The Chaotianmen Bridge in Chongqing, China, is the world's longest through arch bridge.

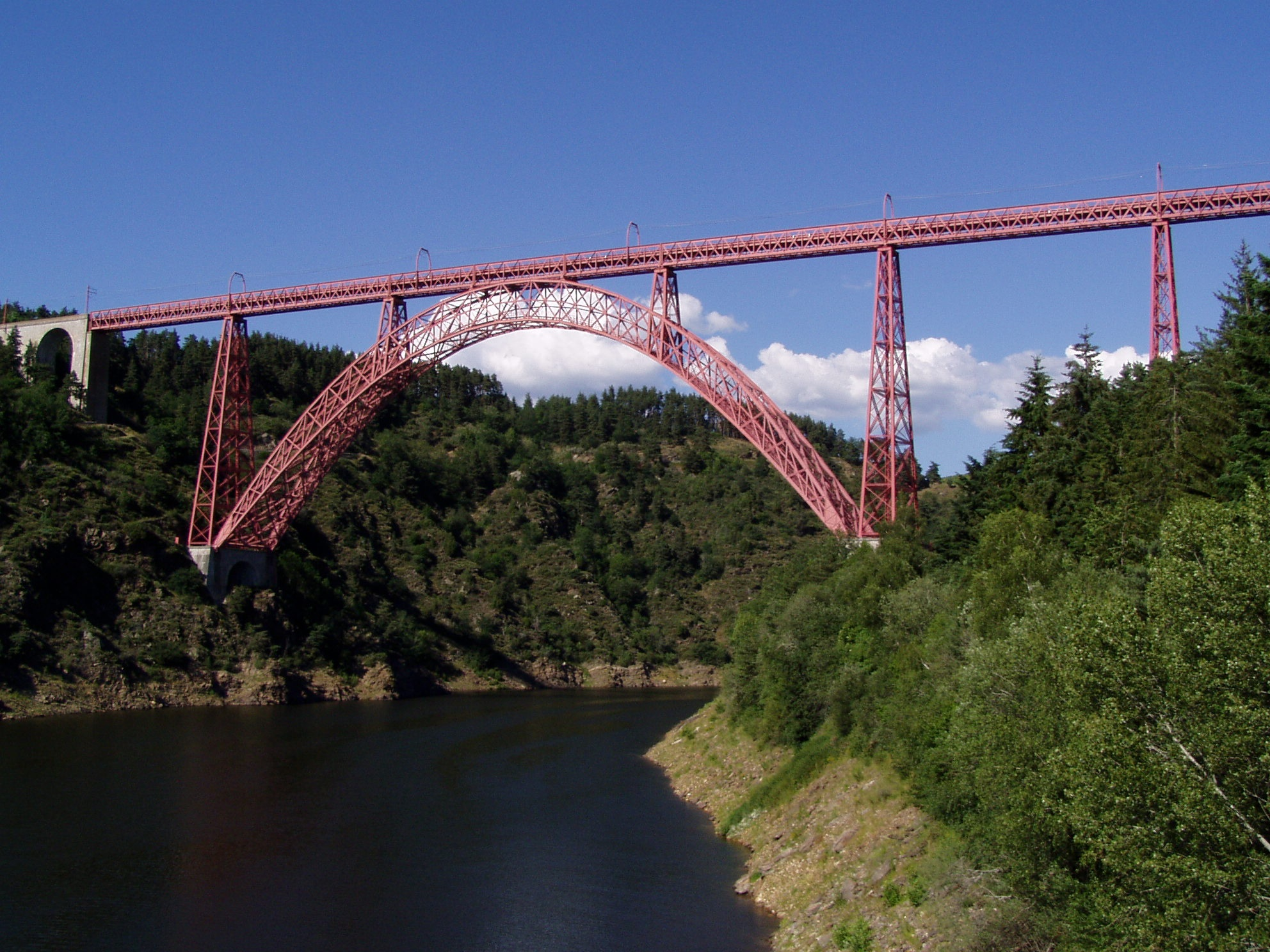
The Garabit Viaduct is a wrought iron truss arch bridge.

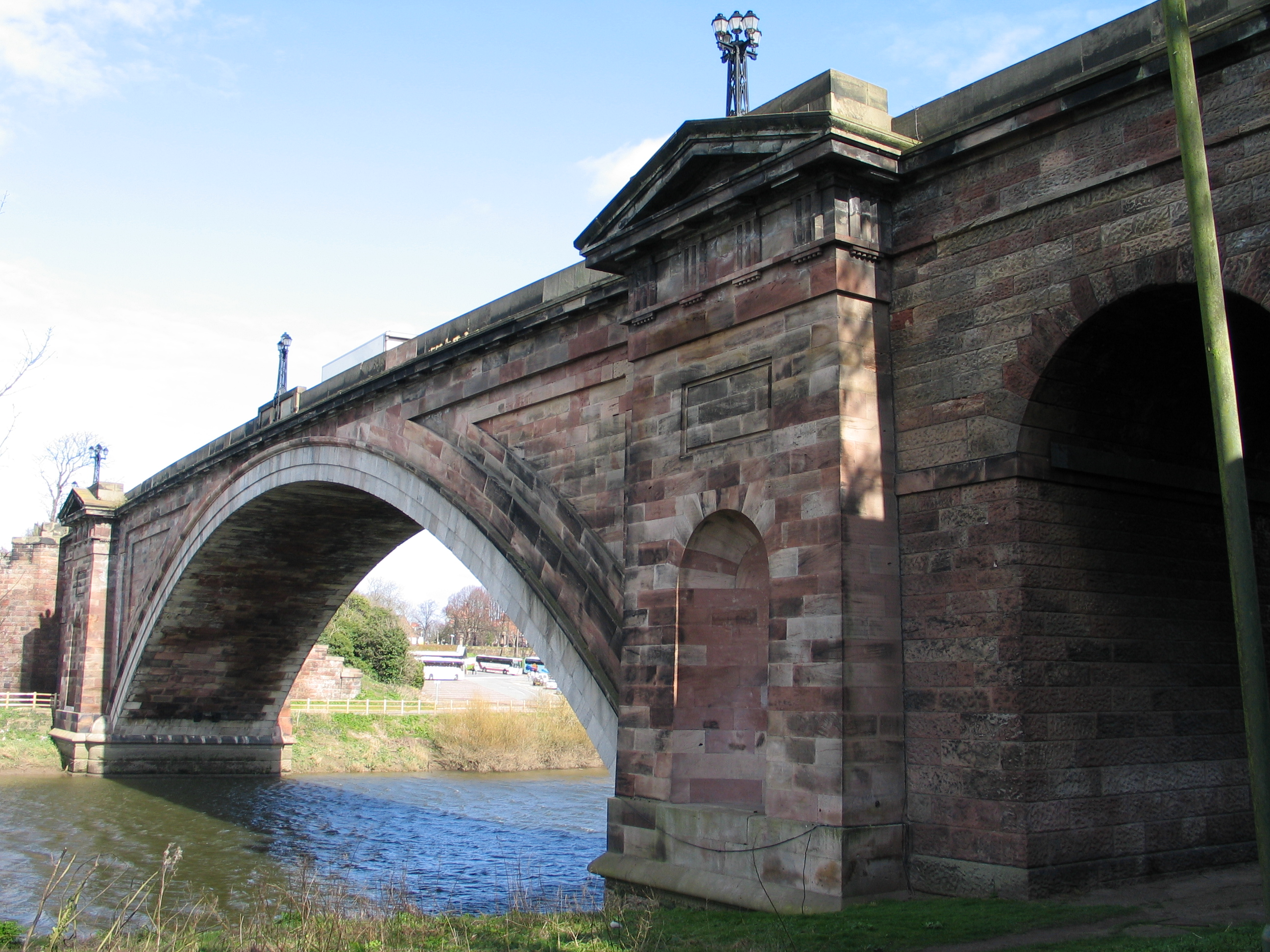
Grosvenor Bridge over the River Dee in Chester, Cheshire, England, UK

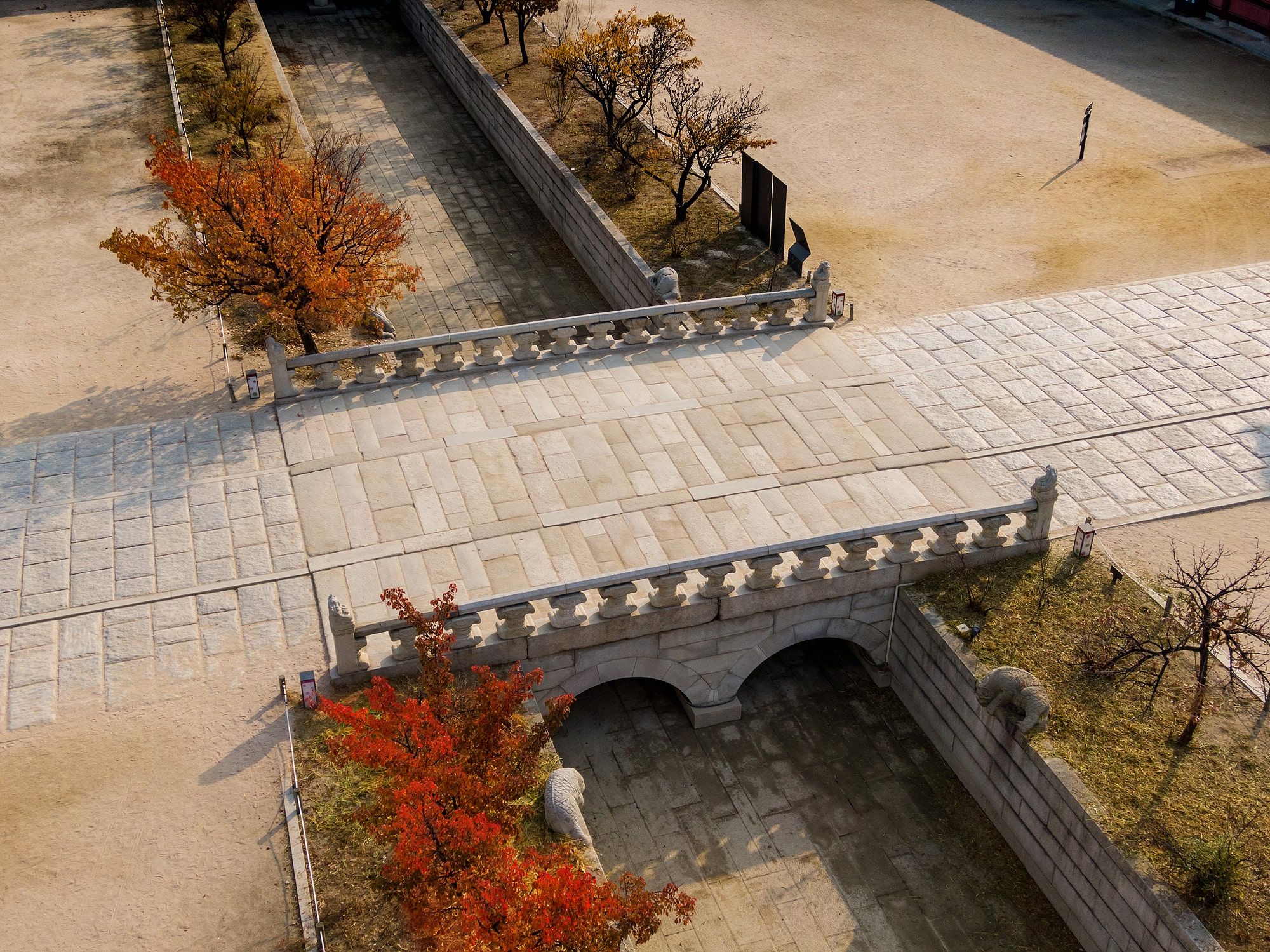
Yeongje Bridge of Heungnyemun, Seoul

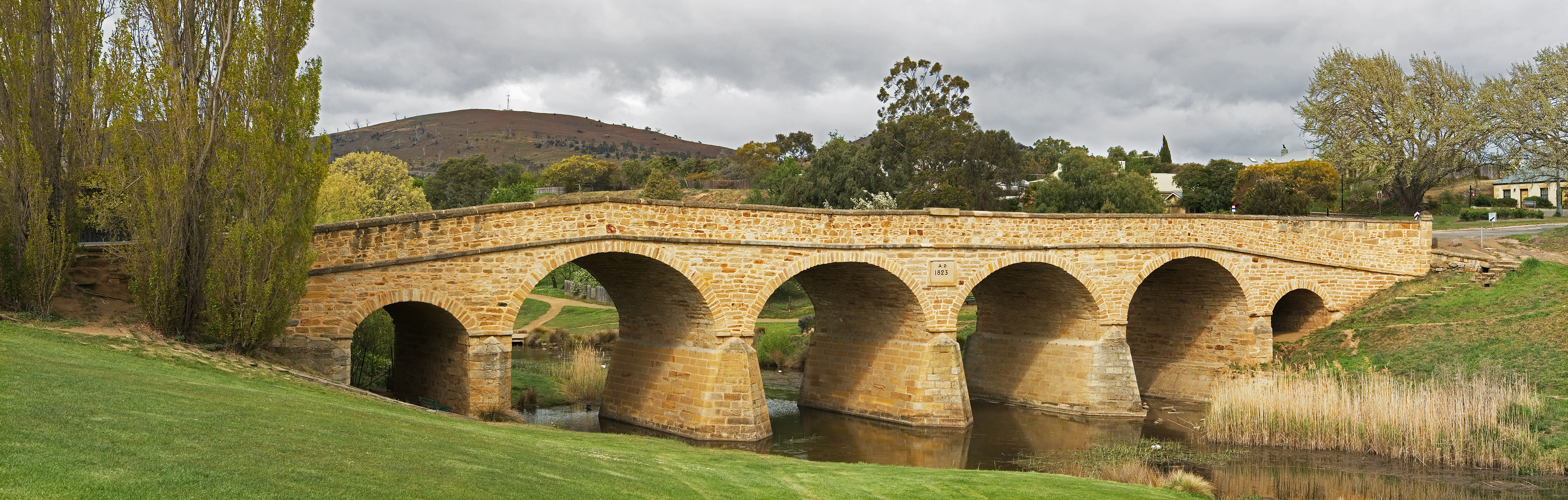
Richmond Bridge (1825), near Hobart, Tasmania the oldest operational bridge in Australia

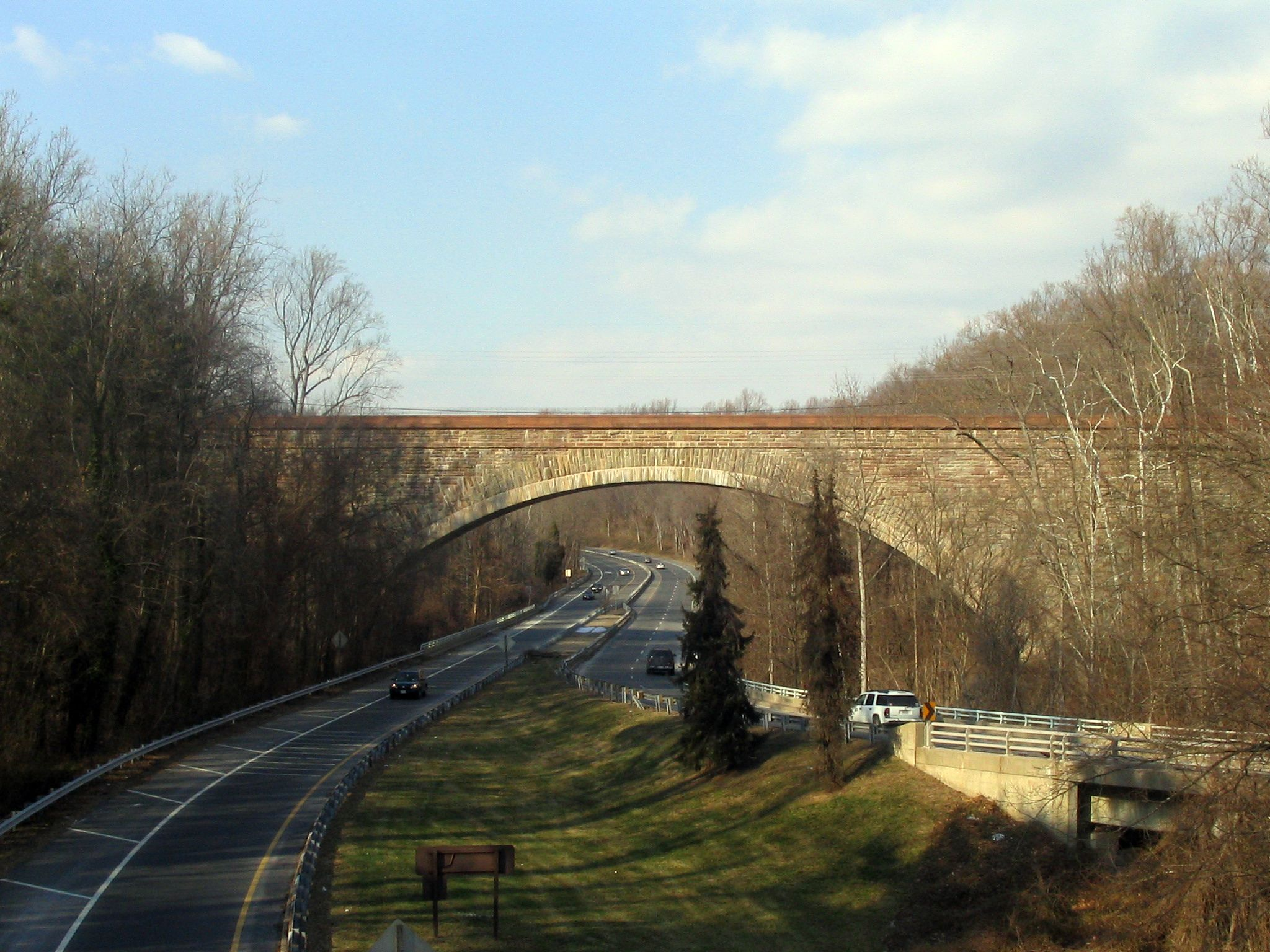
Union Arch Bridge (1864) carrying the Washington Aqueduct and MacArthur Boulevard at Cabin John, Montgomery County, Maryland, USA

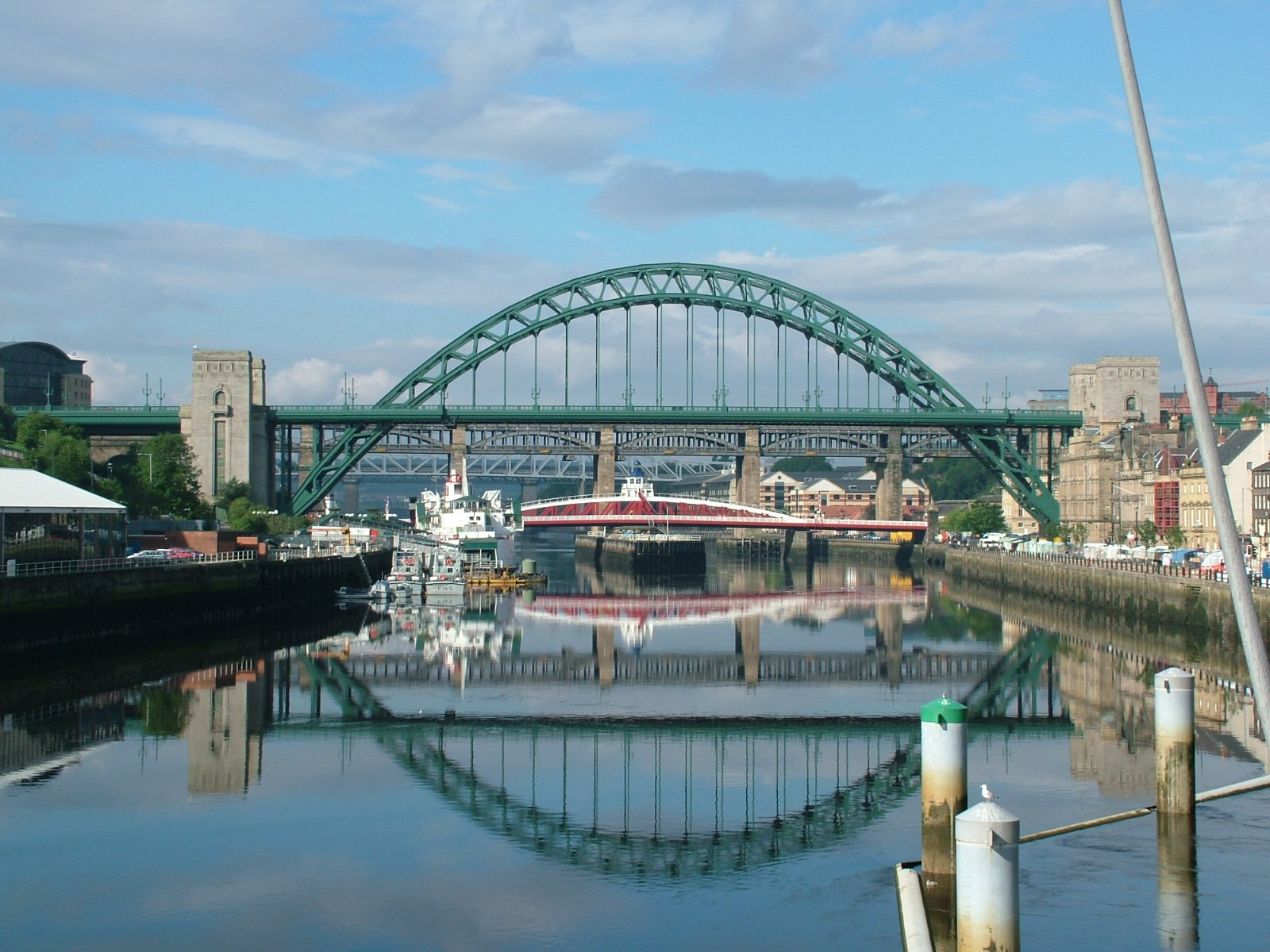
Tyne Bridge over the River Tyne, Newcastle upon Tyne, England, UK

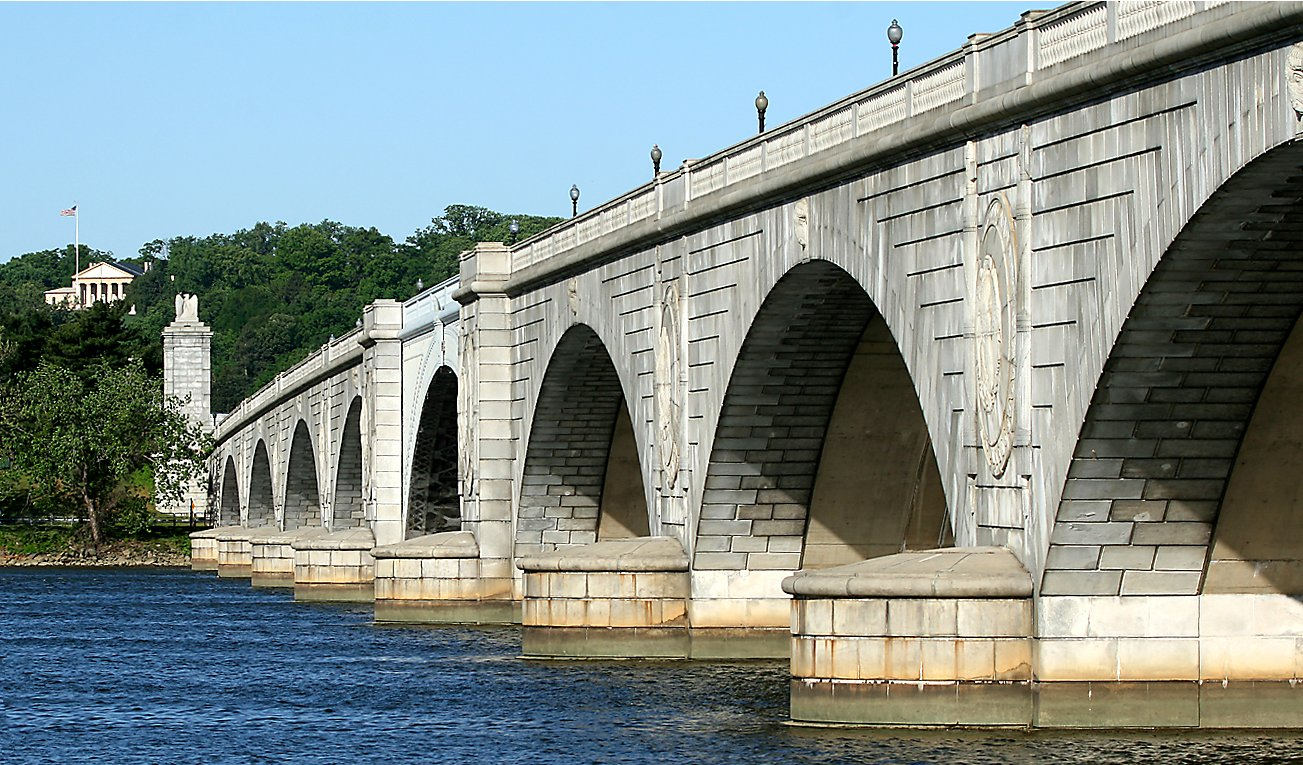
Arlington Memorial Bridge (late 19th century) over the Potomac River in Washington, DC, USA

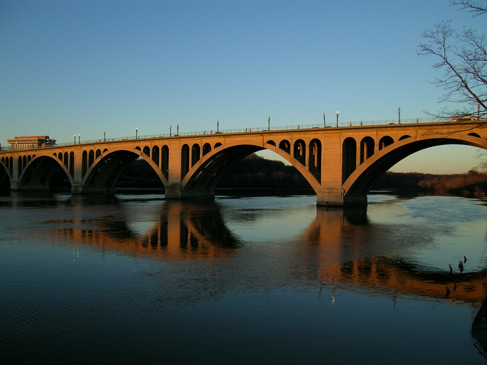
Francis Scott Key Bridge over the Potomac River in Washington, DC, USA

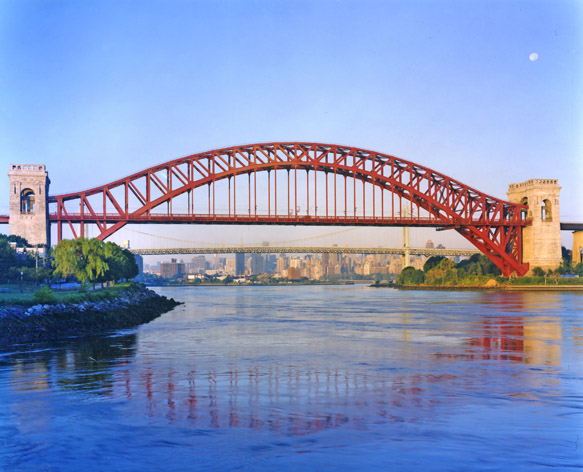
Hell Gate Bridge over the East River, New York City, New York, USA

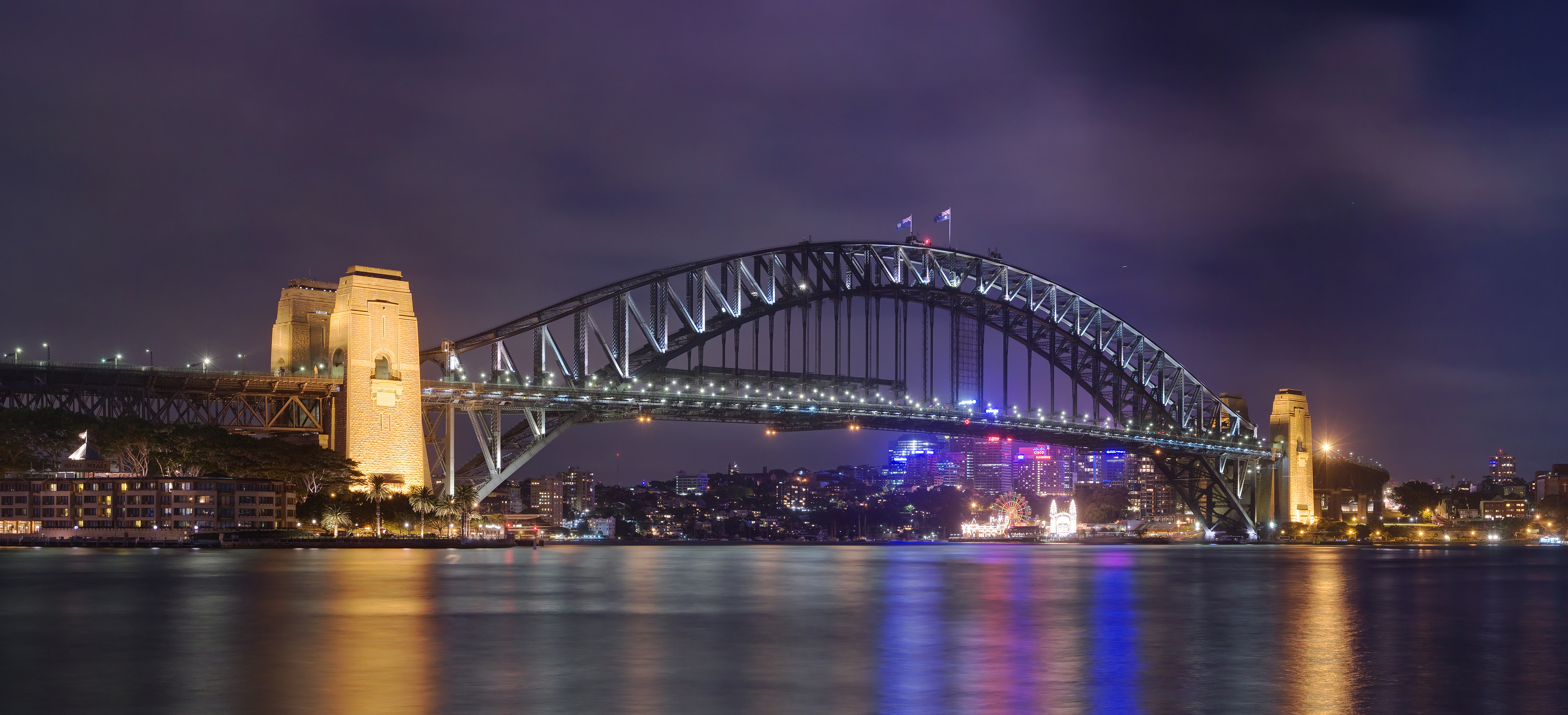
Sydney Harbour Bridge, Sydney, New South Wales, Australia

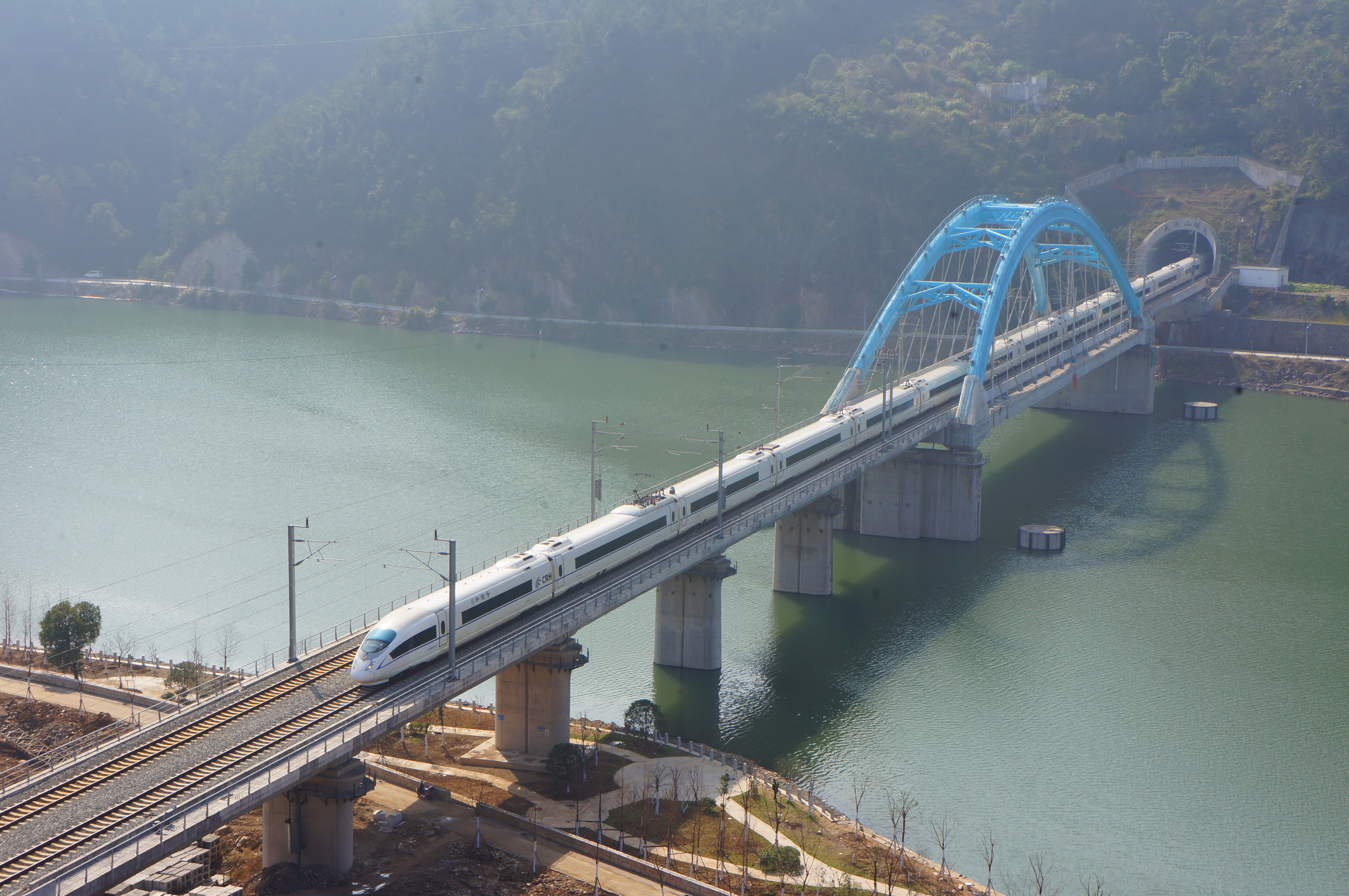
Daxi River Bridge of Jinhua–Wenzhou High Speed Railway

== Use of modern materials ==
Most modern arch bridges are made from reinforced concrete. This type of bridge is suitable where a temporary centering may be erected to support the forms, reinforcing steel, and uncured concrete. When the concrete is sufficiently set, the forms and falseworks are then removed. It is also possible to construct a reinforced concrete arch from precast concrete, where the arch is built in two halves, which are then leaned against each other.

Many modern bridges, made of steel or reinforced concrete, often bear some of their load by tension within their structure. This reduces or eliminates the horizontal thrust against the abutments and allows their construction on weaker ground. Structurally and analytically, they are not true arches but rather a beam with the shape of an arch. See truss arch bridge for more on this type.

A modern evolution of the arch bridge is the long-span through arch bridge. This has been made possible by the use of light materials that are strong in tension, such as steel and prestressed concrete.

== Records sizes ==
As of 2026, the world's largest arch bridge is the Tian'e Longtan Bridge over the Hongshui River, with a length of 2,488 m (8,163 ft) and a span of 600 m (1,969 ft). The bridge was opened 1 February 2024, in Guangxi, China. The largest masonry arch bridge (constructed out of cut stone with only unreinforced concrete), is Danhe Bridge in Jincheng, China, with a length of 356 m (1,168 ft) and a span of 146 m (479 ft).

== See also ==
- Bridge
- Viaduct
- List of bridge types
- Deck (bridge)
- List of arch bridges by length
- List of longest masonry arch bridge spans
- Flying junction
- Natural arch
- Parabolic arch
- Roman bridge
- Skew arch
- Through arch bridge
- Tied arch bridge
- Truss arch bridge
- List of bridges
  - Crueize Viaduct
  - Glenfinnan Viaduct
  - Ribblehead Viaduct
