= List of bridges in France =

This list of bridges in France lists bridges of particular historical, scenic, architectural or engineering interest. Road and railway bridges, viaducts, aqueducts and footbridges are included.

== Historical and architectural interest bridges ==
	Name	Distinction	Length	Type	Carries Crosses	Opened	Location	District	Ref.
1	Pont Julien	Historic monument	118 m (387 ft)	Masonry; 3 semi-circular arches	Via Domitia; Former road bridge Calavon	3 BC	Apt–Bonnieux; 43°51′45.3″N 5°18′23.4″E	Vaucluse	
2	Pont du Gard	Height : 48.7 m (160 ft); Span : 24.4 m (80 ft); World Heritage Site; Historic monument	275 m (902 ft)	Masonry; 3 levels (6, 11 and 35 semi-circular arches), shelly limestone	Aqueduct of Nîmes; Gardon	1st century	Vers-Pont-du-Gard; 43°56′51.2″N 4°32′6.4″E	Gard	
3	Pont Ambroix in ruins	Historic monument	100 m (330 ft)	Masonry; 1 semi-circular arch (7 originally)	Via Domitia; Vidourle	1st century	Gallargues-le-Montueux–Villetelle; 43°43′2″N 4°9′6.9″E	Gard; Hérault	
4	Pont Flavien	Historic monument	25 m (82 ft)	Masonry; 1 semi-circular arch, 2 access doors, limestone	Via Julia Augusta; Touloubre	1st century	Saint-Chamas; 43°32′28.8″N 5°2′34.8″E	Bouches-du-Rhône	
5	Roman Bridge (Vaison-la-Romaine)	Historic monument	17 m (56 ft)	Masonry; 1 arch	Road bridge Ouvèze	1st century	Vaison-la-Romaine; 44°14′20″N 5°4′28.7″E	Vaucluse	
6	Pont romain de Viviers	Historic monument	108 m (354 ft)	Masonry; 11 arches (9 semi-circular, 2 segmental)	Escoutay	2nd century	Viviers; 44°29′18.8″N 4°40′18.2″E	Ardèche	
7	Pont du Diable, Hérault	Routes of Santiago de Compostela in France; World Heritage Site; Historic monument	65 m (213 ft)	Masonry; 2 arches	Former road bridge Hérault (river)	1031	Aniane–Saint-Jean-de-Fos; 43°42′27.4″N 3°33′26.3″E	Hérault	
8	Pont Vieux (Albi)	Episcopal City of Albi; World Heritage Site; Historic monument	151 m (495 ft)	Masonry; 9 arches	Road bridge Tarn (river)	11th century	Albi; 43°55′52.1″N 2°8′40.6″E	Tarn	
9	Pont du Diable (Chalencon)	Historic monument	50 m (160 ft)	Masonry; 2 semi-circular arches	Footbridge; Ance (river)	11th century	Saint-André-de-Chalencon–Tiranges; 45°16′59.5″N 3°59′4.8″E	Haute-Loire	
10	Pont Saint-Bénézet	A chapel sits on the bridge World Heritage Site; Historic monument	120 m (390 ft)	Masonry; 4 arches remaining	Rhône	1185	Avignon; 43°57′13.9″N 4°48′17.5″E	Vaucluse	
11	Pont Vieux de Béziers	Historic monument	241 m (791 ft)	Masonry; 15 arches	Road bridge Orb (river)	12th century	Béziers; 43°20′21.6″N 3°12′29.4″E	Hérault	
12	Pont du Diable (Olargues)	Historic monument		Masonry; 1 main semi-circular arch (7 originally)	Footbridge; Jaur	12th century	Olargues; 43°33′25.2″N 2°54′41.3″E	Hérault	
13	Vieux Pont de Sospel	Bridge castle Historic monument	36 m (118 ft)	Masonry; 2 arches	Footbridge; Bévéra	13th century	Sospel; 43°52′40.7″N 7°26′57.1″E	Alpes-Maritimes	
14	Pont de Rohan	One of the few remaining inhabited bridge Historic monument	67 m (220 ft)	Masonry	Footbridge; Élorn	1336	Landerneau; 48°27′0.5″N 4°14′57.3″W	Finistère	
15	Pont du Diable (Céret)	Span : 45 m (148 ft); Historic monument		Masonry; 1 semi-circular arch	Former road bridge Tech (river)	1341	Céret; 42°29′43.6″N 2°44′39.5″E	Pyrénées-Orientales	
16	Pont Valentré	Bridge castle Routes of Santiago de Compostela in France; World Heritage Site; Historic monument	138 m (453 ft)	Masonry; 7 pointed arches, 3 bridge towers	Footbridge; Lot (river)	1378	Cahors; 44°26′42.2″N 1°25′54.1″E	Lot	
17	Pont Grand (Tournon-sur-Rhône)	Span : 49.2 m (161 ft); Historic monument		Masonry; 1 semi-circular arch	Road bridge Doux (river)	1379	Tournon-sur-Rhône–Saint-Jean-de-Muzols; 45°4′0.1″N 4°46′51.8″E	Ardèche	
18	Pont Vieux (Espalion)	Routes of Santiago de Compostela in France; World Heritage Site; Historic monument		Masonry; 4 pointed arches, sandstone	Footbridge; Lot (river)	14th century	Espalion; 44°31′20.9″N 2°45′49.4″E	Aveyron	
19	Nyons Bridge	Span : 40.5 m (133 ft); Historic monument		Masonry; 1 segmental arch, limestone	Road bridge Aigues	1409	Nyons; 44°21′35.7″N 5°8′38.8″E	Drôme	
20	Pont Neuf	Oldest bridge over the Seine river in Paris; Paris, Banks of the Seine; World Heritage Site; Historic monument	232 m (761 ft)	Masonry; 12 arches (7+5)	Road bridge Seine	1607	1st–6th arrondissement of Paris; 48°51′27.8″N 2°20′30.7″E	Paris	
21	Pont Lesdiguières	Span : 45.6 m (150 ft); Historic monument		Masonry; 1 arch	Former road bridge Drac (river)	1611	Le Pont-de-Claix–Claix; 45°7′14.5″N 5°41′47.2″E	Isère	
22	Pont de Lavaur	Span : 48.7 m (160 ft); Historic monument	116 m (381 ft)	Masonry; 1 arch	Road bridge Agout	1791	Lavaur–Labastide-Saint-Georges; 43°42′5.1″N 1°49′24.6″E	Tarn	
23	Gignac Bridge	Span : 48.4 m (159 ft); Historic monument	175 m (574 ft)	Masonry; 3 arches (1 main pseudo-elliptical, 2 semi-circular)	Road bridge Hérault (river)	1810	Gignac; 43°39′13.1″N 3°32′8.4″E	Hérault	
24	Pont de Vieille-Brioude collapsed in 1822	Span : 54.6 m (179 ft)	100 m (330 ft)	Masonry	Road bridge Allier (river)	1818	Vieille-Brioude; 45°15′38.3″N 3°24′30.8″E	Haute-Loire	
25	Pont de pierre (Bordeaux)	Historic monument	487 m (1,598 ft)	Masonry; 17 segmental arches	Road bridge Bordeaux tramway Garonne	1822	Bordeaux; 44°50′18.3″N 0°33′46.2″W	Gironde	
26	Pont de Tournon-sur-Rhône destroyed in 1965	Conception by Marc Seguin; Span : 85 m (279 ft) (x2)	170 m (560 ft)	Suspension; Iron wire-cable, masonry pylons	Road bridge Rhône	1825	Tournon-sur-Rhône–Tain-l'Hermitage; 45°4′9.6″N 4°50′1.5″E	Ardèche; Drôme	
27	Pont de la Caille	Highest bridge in the world when inaugurated Height : 147 m (482 ft); Span : 191 m (627 ft); Historic monument	191 m (627 ft)	Suspension; Masonry pylons	Former road bridge Les Usses	1839	Cruseilles–Allonzier-la-Caille; 46°0′43″N 6°6′42.4″E	Haute-Savoie	
28	Pont suspendu de Tonnay-Charente	Historic monument	635 m (2,083 ft)	Suspension; Iron and wooden deck	Former road bridge Charente (river)	1842	Tonnay-Charente; 45°56′24.5″N 0°53′9.5″W	Charente-Maritime	
29	Roquefavour Aqueduct	Height : 82.6 m (271 ft); Historic monument	393 m (1,289 ft)	Masonry; 3 levels (12, 15 and 53 semi-circular arches)	Aqueduct; Canal de Marseille; Arc (Provence)	1847	Ventabren; 43°31′0.4″N 5°18′46.8″E	Bouches-du-Rhône	
30	Saint-Chamas viaduct	Height : 31 m (102 ft); Historic monument	385 m (1,263 ft)	Masonry; 49 cross semi-circular arches	Paris–Marseille railway Touloubre	1848	Saint-Chamas; 43°32′33.4″N 5°2′58.9″E	Bouches-du-Rhône	
31	Pont du Jardin des plantes de Grenoble	First bridge made of poured concrete Build by Louis Vicat		Arch; Concrete	Footbridge	1855	Grenoble	Isère	
32	Orb Aqueduct	Canal du Midi; World Heritage Site; Historic monument	240 m (790 ft)	Masonry; 7 elliptical arches	Navigable aqueduct Canal du Midi; Orb (river)	1856	Béziers; 43°20′4.8″N 3°12′46.3″E	Hérault	
33	Pont de Rochemaure	Conception by Marc Seguin; Historic monument	304 m (997 ft)	Suspension; Iron wire-cable, wooden deck, 3 masonry pylons	Former road bridge Rhône	1859	Rochemaure; 44°34′58.1″N 4°42′39.4″E	Ardèche	
34	Viaduc de Busseau	Height : 56.5 m (185 ft); Historic monument	339 m (1,112 ft)	Truss; Wrought iron deck and piers	Montluçon–Saint-Sulpice-Laurière railway Creuse (river)	1864	Ahun–Cressat; 46°07′23.4″N 2°01′35.1″E	Creuse	
35	Pont du Châtelet (Fouillouse)	Height : 108 m (354 ft); Span : 18 m (59 ft)	27 m (89 ft)	Masonry; 1 segmental arch	Road bridge Ubaye	1882	Saint-Paul-sur-Ubaye; 44°32′10.9″N 6°47′08.8″E	Alpes-de-Haute-Provence	
36	Viaduc de Lavaur	Conception by Paul Séjourné; Span : 61.5 m (202 ft)	123 m (404 ft)	Masonry; 1 main semi-circular arch	Montauban-Ville-Bourbon–La Crémade railway Agout	1884	Lavaur–Labastide-Saint-Georges; 43°42′11.8″N 1°49′26.7″E	Tarn	
37	Garabit viaduct	Highest viaduct in the world when inaugurated Construction by Gustave Eiffel; Historic monument	565 m (1,854 ft)	Arch; Wrought iron deck arch	Béziers–Neussargues railway Truyère	1888	Ruynes-en-Margeride–Val-d'Arcomie; 44°58′31.3″N 3°10′37.8″E	Cantal	
38	Briare aqueduct	Longest navigable aqueduct in France; Historic monument	662 m (2,172 ft)	Box girder Steel	Navigable aqueduct Canal latéral à la Loire; Loire	1896	Briare–Saint-Firmin-sur-Loire; 47°37′54.7″N 2°44′11.4″E	Loiret	
39	Oudan Canal Bridge	A rare example of a river-bridge, the river passes over the canal		Box girder Steel	Oudan (river); Canal de Roanne à Digoin	1897	Roanne; 46°02′56.6″N 4°05′48.5″E	Loire	
40	Rochefort-Martrou Transporter Bridge	Last transporter bridge in France; Conception by Ferdinand Arnodin; Historic monument	175 m (574 ft)	Suspension; Steel; Transporter bridge	Charente (river)	1900	Rochefort; 45°54′58.1″N 0°57′39.0″W	Charente-Maritime	
41	Pont Alexandre III	Conception by Louis-Jean Résal; Paris, Banks of the Seine; World Heritage Site; Historic monument	160 m (520 ft)	Arch; Steel deck arch	Road bridge Seine	1900	1st–6th arrondissement of Paris; 48°51′49.2″N 2°18′48.8″E	Paris	
42	Pont des Catalans	Conception by Paul Séjourné	257 m (843 ft)	Masonry; 5 elliptical arches	Road bridge Garonne	1908	Toulouse; 43°36′11.7″N 1°25′40.6″E	Haute-Garonne	
43	Pont Séjourné	Conception by Paul Séjourné; Historic monument	237 m (778 ft)	Masonry; 2 levels (1 and 16 arches)	Ligne de Cerdagne; Têt (river)	1908	Fontpédrouse; 42°31′4″N 2°12′13.5″E	Pyrénées-Orientales	
44	Fades viaduct	Highest railway bridge in France; Height : 132.5 m (435 ft); Piers height : 92.3 m (303 ft); Historic monument	470 m (1,540 ft)	Truss; Warren type, steel and laminated iron deck, granite hollow piers	Lapeyrouse–Volvic railway Sioule	1909	Les Ancizes-Comps–Sauret-Besserve; 45°58′18.2″N 2°48′10″E	Puy-de-Dôme	
45	Pont de Cassagne	Conception by Ferdinand Arnodin; Historic monument	253 m (830 ft)	Suspension; Metal girder deck and pylons, masonry piers Gisclard cable bridge	Ligne de Cerdagne; Têt (river)	1909	Sauto–Planès; 42°30′14.3″N 2°8′36.1″E	Pyrénées-Orientales	
46	Pont des Pierres destroyed in 1944	Span : 80 m (260 ft)		Masonry; 1 segmental arch	Road bridge Bellegarde–Chézery tramway Valserine	1910	Confort–Montanges; 46°9′55″N 5°48′40″E	Ain	
47	Black Rocks Viaduct	Conception by Ferdinand Arnodin; Historic monument	170 m (560 ft)	Suspension; Metal girder deck and pylons, masonry piers Gisclard cable bridge	Transcorrézien; Luzège	1913	Lapleau–Soursac; 45°16′6.2″N 2°10′56″E	Corrèze	
48	Viaduc de la Roizonne	Conception by Paul Séjourné; Span : 79 m (259 ft)	260 m (850 ft)	Masonry; 1 main semi-circular arch	Chemin de fer de La Mure; Roizonne	1928	Nantes-en-Ratier–Siévoz; 44°54′51.7″N 5°49′43.4″E	Isère	

== Major road and railway bridges ==
This table presents the structures with spans greater than 100 meters (non-exhaustive list).

	Name	Span	Length	Type	Carries Crosses	Opened	Location	District	Ref.
1	Pont de Normandie	856 m (2,808 ft)	2,142 m (7,028 ft)	Cable-stayed; Steel box girder deck, concrete pylons 43+96+856+96+43	A29 autoroute European route E44; Seine	1995	Le Havre–Honfleur; 49°25′56.1″N 0°16′26.3″E	Seine-Maritime; Calvados	(Note: The Pont de Normandie held the record of the longest cable-stayed bridge in the world from 1995 to 1999, when the Tatara Bridge opened in Japan.)
2	Tancarville Bridge	608 m (1,995 ft)	1,400 m (4,600 ft)	Suspension; Steel truss deck, concrete pylons 176+608+176	A131 autoroute European route E5; Route nationale 182; Seine	1959	Tancarville–Marais-Vernier; 49°28′21.6″N 0°27′52.8″E	Seine-Maritime; Eure	
3	Saint-Nazaire Bridge	404 m (1,325 ft)	3,356 m (11,010 ft)	Cable-stayed; Steel box girder deck, steel pylons 158+404+158	Route départementale 213; Loire	1975	Saint-Nazaire–Saint-Brevin-les-Pins; 47°17′6.3″N 2°10′13.8″W	Loire-Atlantique	(Note: The Saint-Nazaire Bridge, with its access viaducts, is the longest bridge of metropolitan France. The 404 metres (1,325 ft) main span was in 1975 the longest cable-stayed span in the world, until the opening of the Engineer Carlos Fernández Casado Bridge in 1983 in Spain.)
4	Pont de l'Iroise	400 m (1,300 ft)	800 m (2,600 ft)	Cable-stayed; Concrete box girder deck, concrete pylons 47+51+102+400+102+51+47	Route nationale 165; European route E60; Élorn	1994	Plougastel-Daoulas–Le Relecq-Kerhuon; 48°23′18.1″N 4°23′55.6″W	Finistère	
5	Pont d'Aquitaine	394 m (1,293 ft)	1,766 m (5,794 ft)	Suspension; Steel truss deck, concrete pylons 143+394+143	A630 autoroute European route E5; Bordeaux Ring Road; Garonne	1967	Bordeaux; 44°52′47.2″N 0°32′9.7″W	Gironde	
6	Millau Viaduct	342 m (1,122 ft)(x6)	2,460 m (8,070 ft)	Cable-stayed; Steel box girder deck, 7 concrete pylons 204+6x342+204	A75 autoroute European route E11; Gorges du Tarn	2004	Millau–Creissels; 44°4′48″N 3°1′20.6″E	Aveyron	
7	Pont de Brotonne	320 m (1,050 ft)	1,278 m (4,193 ft)	Cable-stayed; Concrete box girder deck, concrete pylons 70+143+320+143+58	Route départementale 490; Seine	1977	Caudebec-en-Caux; 49°31′13.9″N 0°44′49.8″E	Seine-Maritime	
8	Chavanon Viaduct	300 m (980 ft)	360 m (1,180 ft)	Suspension; Composite steel/concrete deck, concrete pylons	A89 autoroute European route E70; Chavanon	2000	Merlines–Messeix; 45°37′26.5″N 2°28′47.5″E	Corrèze; Puy-de-Dôme	
9	Térénez bridge	285 m (935 ft)	515 m (1,690 ft)	Cable-stayed; Concrete curved deck, concrete pylons 34+81+285+81+34	Route nationale 791; Aulne	2011	Landévennec–Rosnoën; 48°16′7.9″N 4°15′48.2″W	Finistère	
10	Bras de la Plaine Bridge	281 m (922 ft)	305 m (1,001 ft)	Box girder Composite steel/concrete deck	Route départementale 26; Bras de la Plaine	2001	Saint-Pierre–Entre-Deux; 21°16′35.5″S 55°27′56.7″E	Réunion	
11	Grand Canal du Havre Bridge	275 m (902 ft)	1,410 m (4,630 ft)	Beam bridge Steel; V-shaped legs 107+275+107	A29 autoroute European route E44; Grand Canal du Havre	1994	Le Havre; 49°27′54.8″N 0°16′27.6″E	Seine-Maritime	
12	Chateaubriand Bridge	260 m (850 ft)	424 m (1,391 ft)	Arch; Concrete deck arch	Route nationale 176; Rance (river)	1991	Plouër-sur-Rance–La Ville-ès-Nonais; 48°32′14.6″N 1°58′17.3″W	Côtes-d'Armor; Ille-et-Vilaine	
13	Grande Ravine Viaduct	250 m (820 ft)	288 m (945 ft)	Box girder Composite steel/concrete deck	Route des Tamarins; Grande Ravine	2009	Les Trois-Bassins; 21°7′19.6″S 55°16′46.8″E	Réunion	
14	La Roche-Bernard Bridge	245 m (804 ft)	409 m (1,342 ft)	Suspension; Steel truss deck, concrete pylons	Route départementale 765; Vilaine	1960	La Roche-Bernard–Marzan; 47°31′28.6″N 2°18′18.4″W	Morbihan	
15	Oyapock River Bridge	245 m (804 ft)	378 m (1,240 ft)	Cable-stayed; Concrete deck, concrete pylons 66+245+66	Route nationale 2 (Guiana); Oyapock	2011	Saint-Georges–Oiapoque; 3°52′51″N 51°48′9″W	French Guiana; Brazil	
16	Cheviré Bridge	242 m (794 ft)	1,563 m (5,128 ft)	Box girder Steel; 69+242+69	Route nationale 844; European route E3; Nantes Ring Road; Loire	1990	Nantes; 47°11′34.5″N 1°36′49.2″W	Loire-Atlantique	
17	Ancenis Suspension Bridge	238 m (781 ft)	412 m (1,352 ft)	Suspension; Steel truss deck, concrete pylons 80+238+80	Route nationale 763; Loire	1953	Ancenis–Liré; 47°21′42.3″N 1°10′35.1″W	Loire-Atlantique; Maine-et-Loire	
18	Three Countries Bridge	229 m (751 ft)	250 m (820 ft)	Arch; Steel through arch	Footbridge; Rhine	2007	Huningue–Weil am Rhein; 47°35′29.5″N 7°35′23.8″E	Haut-Rhin; Germany	(Note: The tripoint border between France, Germany and Switzerland is situated about 100 metres (330 ft) south of the Three Countries Bridge, so the bridge is on the France–Germany border but doesn't cross exactly the France–Switzerland border.)
19	Viaur Viaduct	220 m (720 ft)	460 m (1,510 ft)	Arch; Steel deck arch	Castelnaudary–Rodez Railway; Viaur	1902	Tauriac-de-Naucelle–Tanus; 44°7′25.6″N 2°19′51.1″E	Aveyron; Tarn	
20	Martigues Viaduct	210 m (690 ft)	875 m (2,871 ft)	Box girder Steel; V-shaped legs	A55 autoroute Caronte Canal	1972	Martigues; 43°24′8.9″N 5°2′32.1″E	Bouches-du-Rhône	
21	Pierre Pflimlin Bridge	205 m (673 ft)	957 m (3,140 ft)	Box girder Prestressed concrete 121+205+139	Route nationale 353; Rhine	2002	Strasbourg–Offenburg; 48°29′29.1″N 7°46′10.1″E	Bas-Rhin; Germany	
22	Morbihan Bridge	201 m (659 ft)	376 m (1,234 ft)	Arch; Concrete deck arch	Route nationale 165; European route E60; Vilaine	1995	La Roche-Bernard; 47°31′53.8″N 2°18′1.7″W	Morbihan	
23	Europe Bridge (Orléans)	201 m (659 ft)	470 m (1,540 ft)	Arch; Steel through arch	Route nationale 152; Loire	2000	Saint-Jean-de-la-Ruelle–Saint-Pryvé-Saint-Mesmin; 47°53′44.5″N 1°52′34.8″E	Loiret	
24	Cornouaille Bridge	200 m (660 ft)	610 m (2,000 ft)	Box girder Steel; 110+200+110	Route départementale 44; Odet	1972	Bénodet; 47°53′6.4″N 4°7′18.1″W	Finistère	
25	Saint-Just-Saint-Rambert Bridge	200 m (660 ft)	270 m (890 ft)	Suspension; Self-anchored, composite steel/concrete deck, concrete pylons	Route nationale 498; Loire	2008	Saint-Just-Saint-Rambert; 45°31′2.3″N 4°14′56.3″E	Loire	

== Notes and references ==
- Notes
- "POP : la plateforme ouverte du patrimoine". Pop.culture.gouv.fr - Ministry of Culture (in French). Mérimée database
- Nicolas Janberg. "International Database for Civil and Structural Engineering". Structurae.com.
- Others references

== See also ==
- List of bridges in Paris
- List of medieval bridges in France
- Transport in France
- Roads in France
- Highways in France
- Rail transport in France
- Geography of France
- fr:Liste des ponts de France protégés aux monuments historiques (in French) - List of bridges in France protected as historical monuments
- Charenton Metro-Viaduct
- Crueize Viaduct
