= Pont de la Caille =

Pont de la Caille Pont Charles-Albert
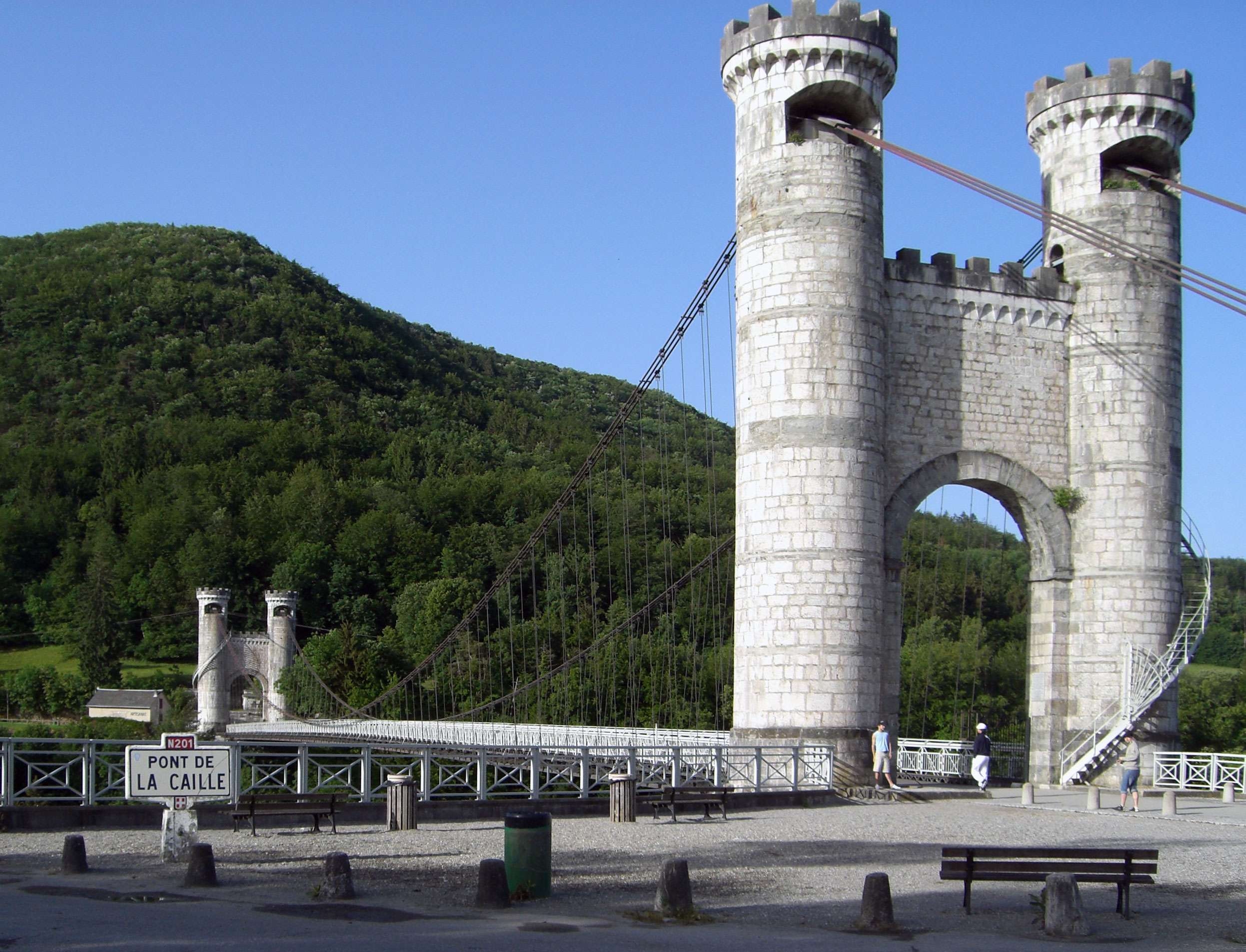
- Coordinates: 46.01213°N 6.11139°E
- Crosses: Usses
- Locale: Allonzier-la-Caille – Cruseilles, Haute-Savoie, France

Characteristics
- Design: Suspension bridge

Location
- Interactive map of Pont de la Caille

The Pont Charles-Albert, more commonly known as the Pont de la Caille, is a suspension bridge, spanning the municipalities of Allonzier-la-Caille and Cruseilles in the department of Haute-Savoie in the Auvergne-Rhône-Alpes region of France.

Designed for crossing the Usses river, it was inaugurated on 11 July 1839 and has been listed as a monument historique since 6 May 1966.

== Fame ==
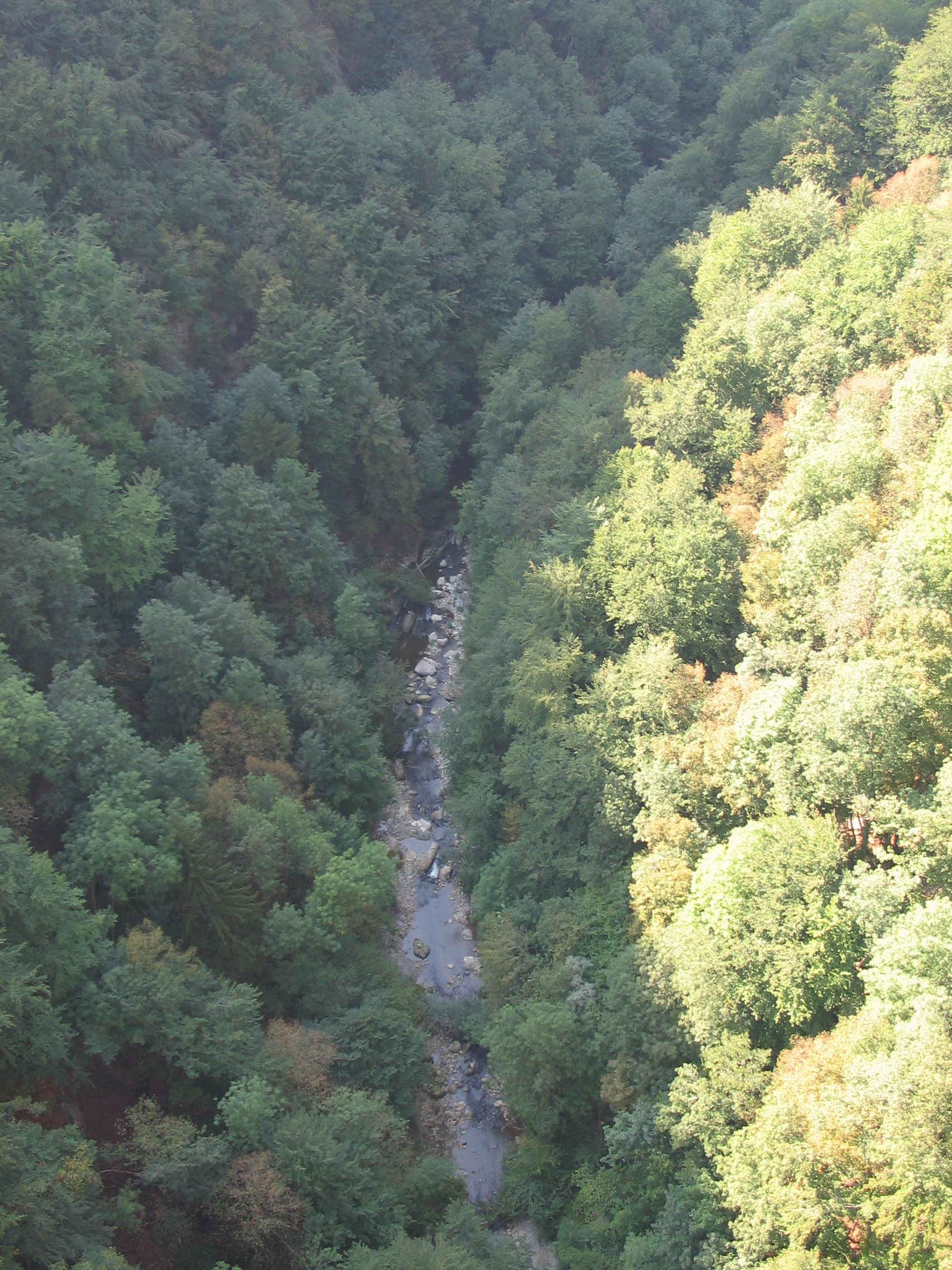
The wooded valley of the Usses river below.

Since December 2020, technical solutions have been studied by the Department and the community of municipalities of the Cruseilles region in order to secure the bridge.

== Bibliography ==
- Marcel Prade, Les Ponts monuments historiques, Brissaud, Poitiers, 1986 ISBN 2903442819
