= Saint-Chamas viaduct =

Railway viaduct

Viaduc de Saint-Chamas
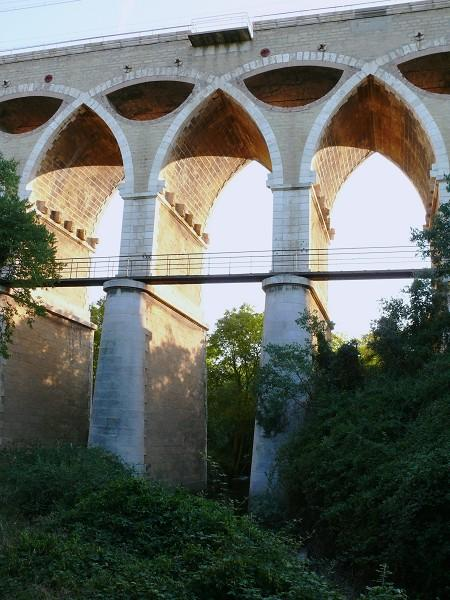
- Coordinates: 43°32′33″N 5°02′59″E
- Locale: Saint-Chamas, Bouches-du-Rhône, Provence-Alpes-Côte d'Azur, France

Characteristics
- Total length: 386 m
- Height: 31 m

History
- Built: 1848

The Saint-Chamas viaduct, also known as the Saint-Léger viaduct, is a masonry railway viaduct that crosses the Touloubre river on the Paris-Lyon to Marseille-Saint-Charles line. It is located in Saint-Chamas, in the Bouches-du-Rhône département of France.

== Location ==
Around 386 meters long, the Saint-Chamas viaduct is located between kilometre points 815.262 and 815.648 of the Paris-Lyon to Marseille-Saint-Charles line, between the active stations of Saint-Chamas and Rognac (interspersed with the closed stations of Calissanne and Berre).

== Historical background ==
There were three distinct periods in the construction of masonry bridges in 19th-century France. The first forty years saw the completion of all the major road bridges needed to complete the national network. Then came the era of the railroads, whose constraining profiles led to the construction of a considerable number of masonry viaducts. At the end of the century, masonry bridges found a new (and final) lease of life thanks to Paul Séjourné.

The Saint-Chamas viaduct, commissioned in 1848, belongs to the second period. It was built under the direction of engineer Gustave Desplaces.

== Description ==
With a total length of 385.40 m, the viaduct is made up of 49 interlocking semicircular arches, intersecting at a third of their height and resembling a series of ogives. Its maximum height is 31 metres.

While at first glance the bridge's unusual lines may appeal, closer inspection raises doubts about the relevance of its complexity. This original structure certainly enabled the thickness of the arches to be reduced but at the cost of additional piers that were probably unnecessary. For this reason, reducing the thickness of the vault may not have been the goal. Some bridges of this period had ogival intrados, but few similar to the Saint-Chamas viaduct exist. Paul Séjourné's assessment of the work was harsh: “It's expensive and ugly. Fortunately, these absurd structures have not been imitated.

== Architectural protection ==
The viaduct was listed as a historic monument by decree on December 28, 1984.

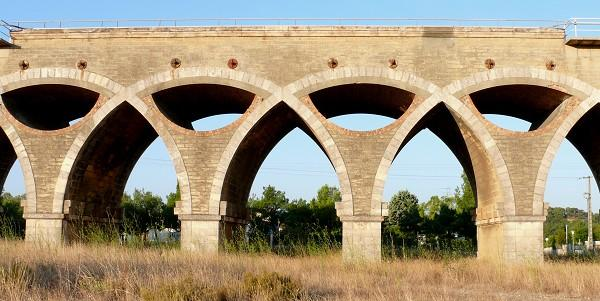
Symmetrical interlocking of arches, forming ribbed vaults.

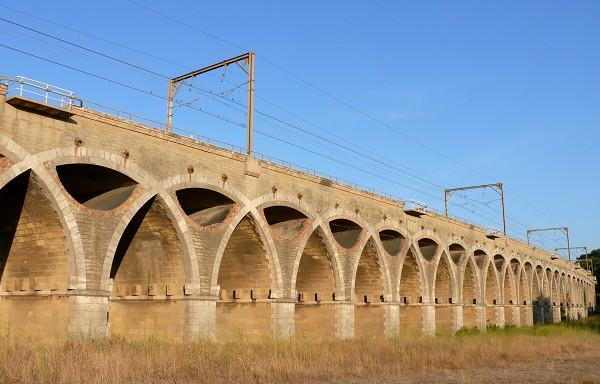
View of the electrification lines.

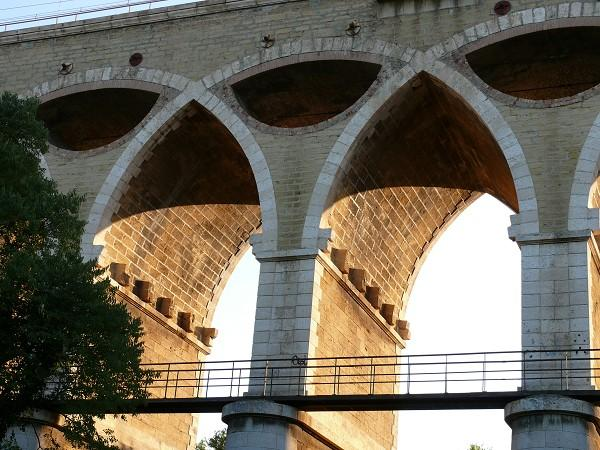
Service footbridge.

== See also ==
- Paris–Marseille railway

== Bibliography ==
- Grattesat, Guy (1982). Ponts de France (in French). Presses des Ponts et Chaussées. ISBN 2-85978-030-0.
- Montens, Serge (1982). Les plus beaux ponts de France (in French). Bonneton. ISBN 2-86253-275-4.
- Prade, Marcel (1988). Ponts et Viaducs au xixe siècle (in French). Brissaud. ISBN 2-902170-59-9.
- Caron, François (1999). Le Patrimoine de la SNCF et des chemins de fer français (2 Tomes) (in French). Flohic Editions. ISBN 2-84234-069-8.
- Cartier, Claudine (2007). Patrimoine ferroviaire (in French). Scala. ISBN 978-2-86656-394-3.
