= Pont du Diable, Hérault =

11th-century bridge in southern France

Coordinates: 43°42′27″N 3°33′27″E

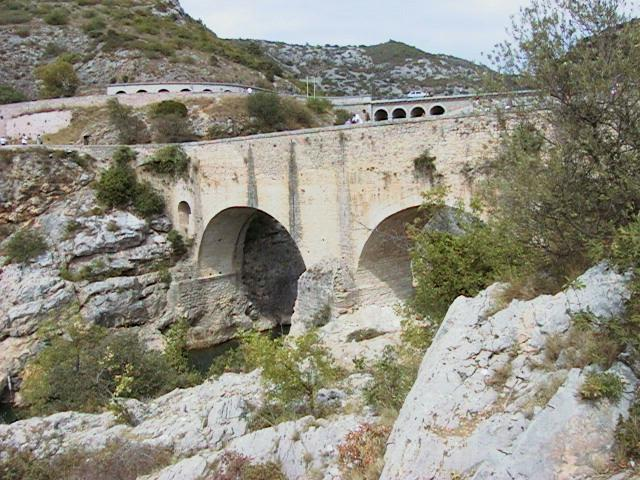
Pont du Diable

The Pont du Diable on the river Hérault is one of many bridges in France with this name (it means Devil's bridge). It is located over a steep-sided gorge, about 4 km north-west of Aniane in the Hérault département.

Constructed by Benedictine monks in the first half of the 11th century, it provided a link between the abbey at Aniane and the Gellone Abbey at Saint-Guilhem-le-Désert. Though subsequently widened and raised several metres around 1770, it has retained its original shape. Vehicular traffic is now catered for by a newer bridge, from which splendid views may be had of the original bridge and an aqueduct that takes water to the vineyards of Saint-Jean-de-Fos.

The bridge has been listed by the French Ministry of Culture as a monument historique since 1935 and is listed as a UNESCO World Heritage Site as part of the World Heritage Sites of the Routes of Santiago de Compostela in France.

There are two other bridges in Hérault known as "Pont du Diable", at Olargues and at Villemagne-l'Argentière.

== See also ==
- Devil's Bridge
- List of medieval bridges in France
- List of bridges in France
