= Pont du Diable (Olargues) =

Pont du Diable Pont du Diable
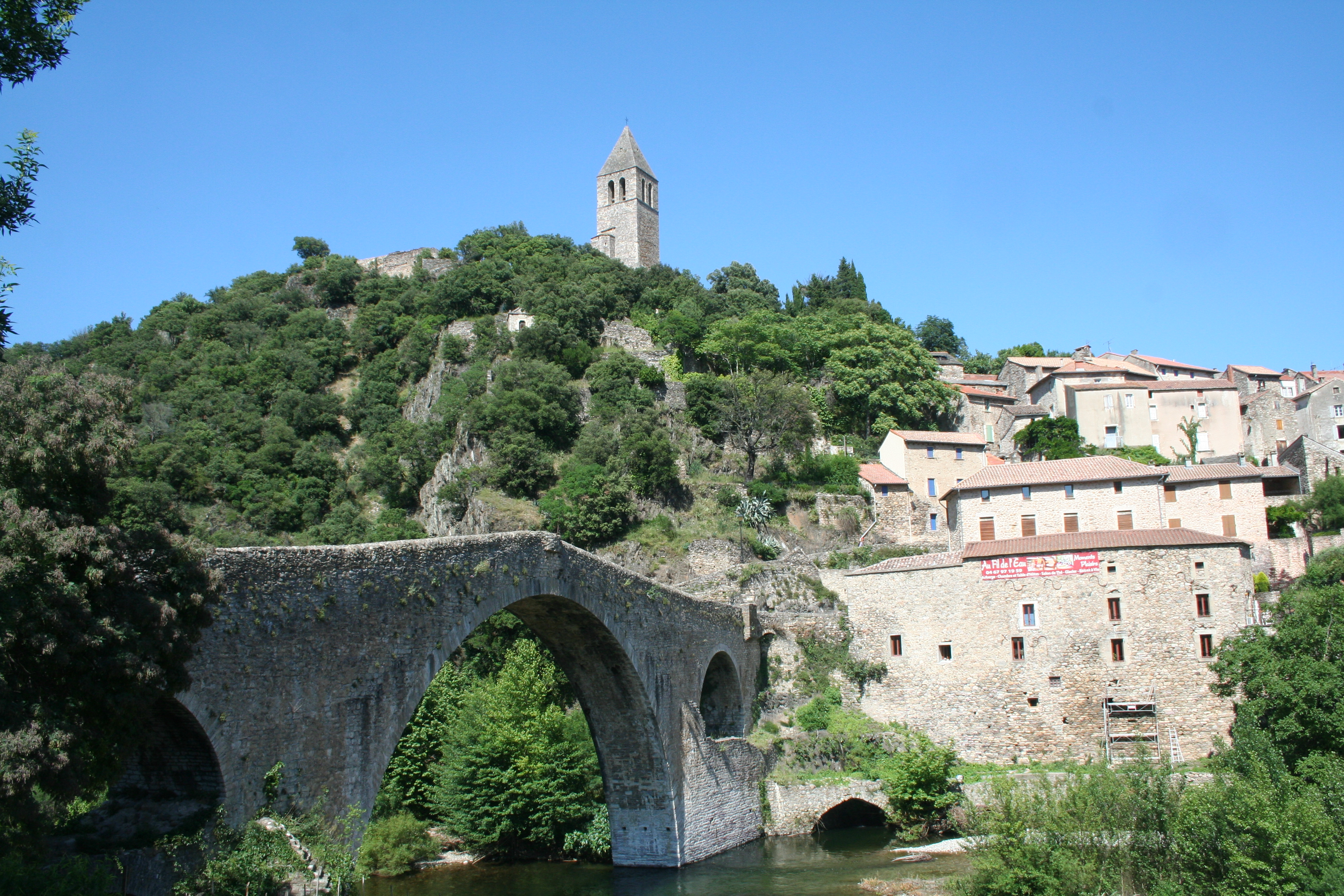
- Coordinates: 43°33′25″N 2°54′42″E
- Crosses: Jaur
- Locale: Olargues, Hérault, France

Characteristics
- Design: Arch bridge

Location
- Interactive map of Pont du Diable

The Pont du Diable is a Romaneque bridge in Olargues, France, in the department of Hérault.

== History ==
The bridge dates from the early 12th century. It was renovated in 1758.

The bridge has been deemed a monument historique since August 23, 1916.
