= Via Julia Augusta =

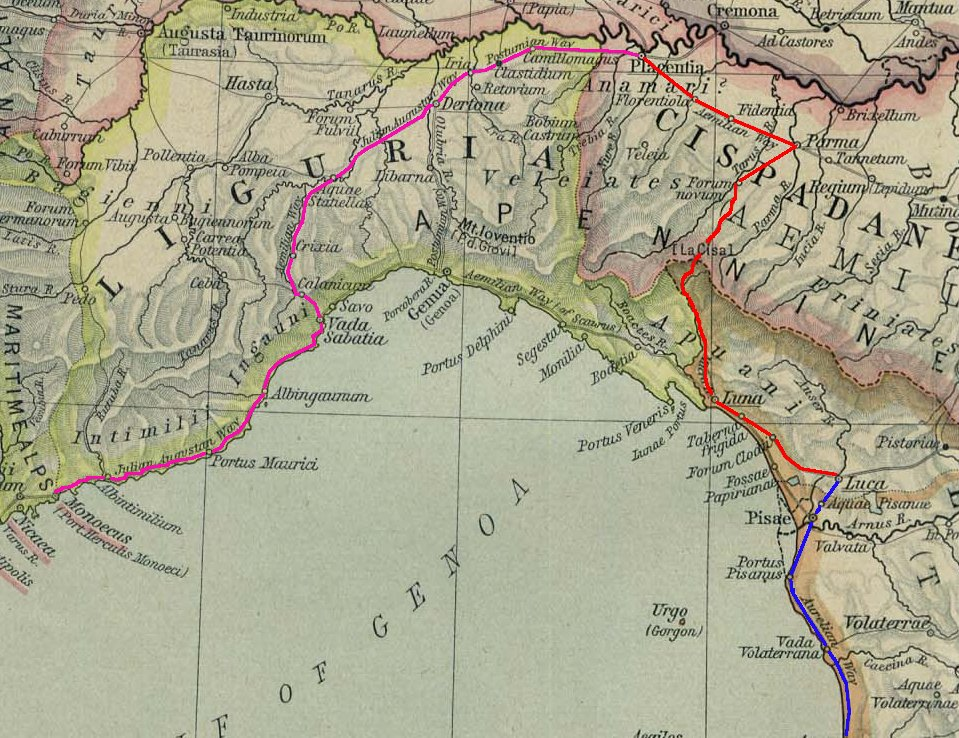
- Map of Julia Augusta, indicated in pink
- Type: Roman road
- Periods: 13 BC
- Location: Placentia (modern Piacenza) to Arelate (modern Arles)

History
- Built by: Roman Empire, Augustus Caesar

The Via Julia Augusta (modern Italian Via Giulia Augusta) is the name given to the Roman road formed by the merging of the Via Aemilia Scauri with the Via Postumia.

== History ==
The Via Julia Augusta was begun in 13 BC by Augustus, and its engineering works were repeatedly renewed by later emperors. The road runs from Placentia (modern Piacenza) to Arelate (modern Arles), initially westward along the edge of the plain of the River Po to Derthona (Tortona), then southward to the Ligurian coast. There it formed a continuous route westward along the precipitous descent of the Ligurian mountains into the sea. This takes it to Vada Sabatia (Vado Ligure) and Albenga. The Via Julia Augusta leaves Albenga at the Porta d'Arroscia, the south gate of the city, and proceeds to Alassio. The route is lined with Roman funerary monuments. The section from Albenga to Alassio is one of the better preserved parts of the Via Julia Augusta.

From there it continues to Ventimiglia and La Turbie. The Col de La Turbie is the highest point of the Via Julia Augusta and the site of the Tropaeum Alpium, a monument built by Augustus to celebrate his victory over the Alpine tribes.

Later it was extended, taking a route away from the coast via the valley of the River Laghet, north of Nice and westward to Arles where it joined the Via Domitia.

By about 420, when Rutilius Namatianus returned to Gaul from Italia, he took ship past the Maritime Alps rather than rely upon the decaying road. In 1764 Tobias Smollett similarly travelled by sea rather than use the seaside tracks, fit only for "mules and foot passengers". Road access was not restored until the time of Napoleon.

In 2006, the French Riviera Community and Ventimiglia cooperated to restore the Via Julia Augusta.

== Roman bridges ==
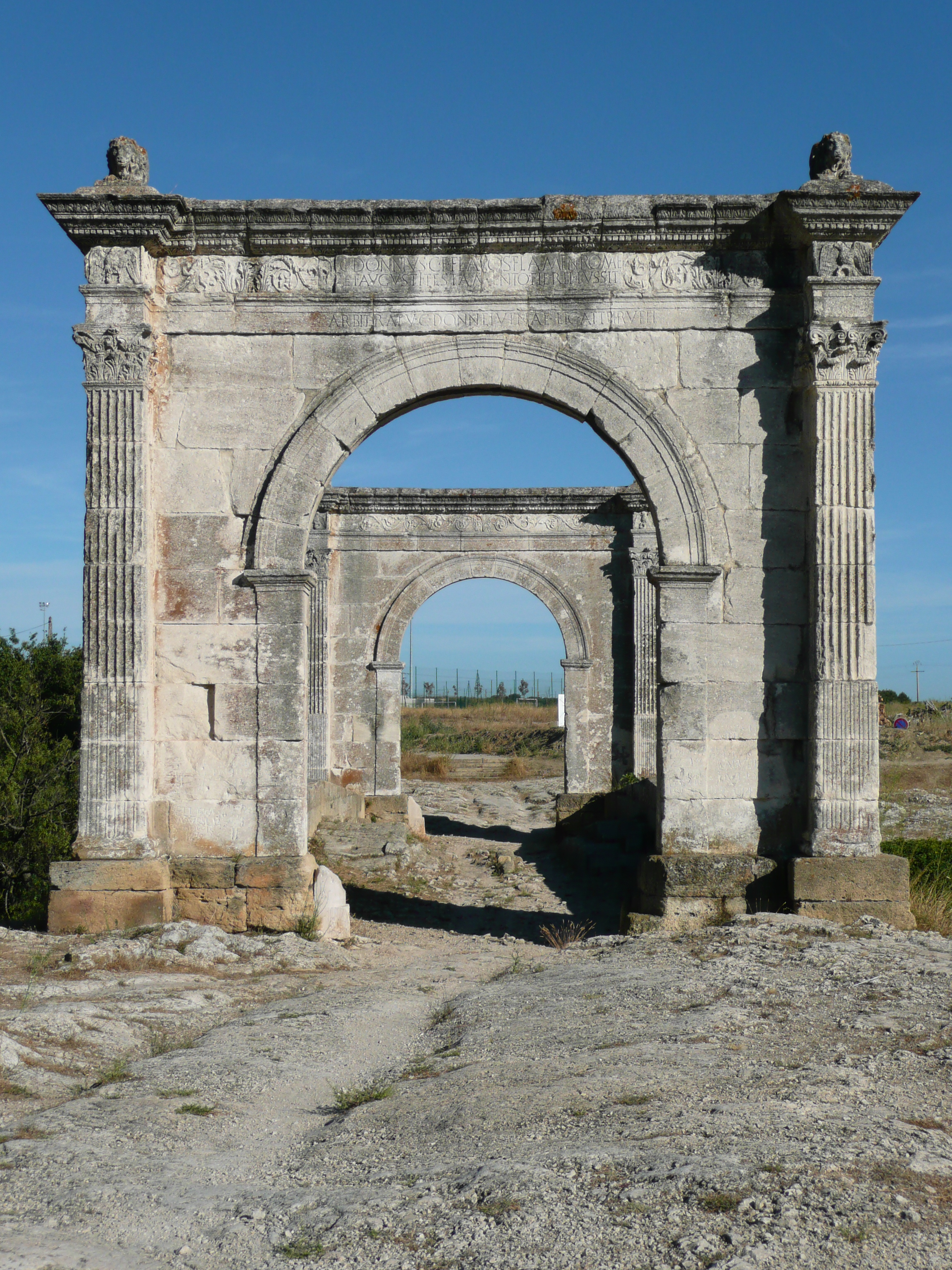
Remains of the Pont Flavien bridge on the Via Julia Augusta in Saint-Chamas in southern France

There are the remains of a number of Roman bridges along the road, including the Pont des Esclapes Pont Flavien; Pontaccio; Ponte dell’Acqua; Ponte delle Fate; Ponte delle Voze; Ponte Lungo; Ponte sul Rio della Torre; Primo Ponte di Val Ponci; Quarto Ponte di Val Ponci and Pontetto.

== See also ==
- Roman engineering
