= Fades viaduct =

Fades Viaduct Viaduc des Fades
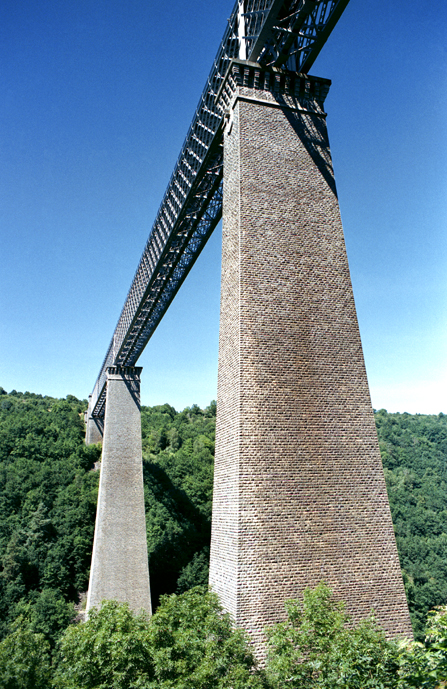
- The Fades Viaduct
- Coordinates: 45°58′19″N 2°48′11″E
- Carries: Railway
- Crosses: Sioule
- Locale: Puy-de-Dôme, Auvergne region, France

Characteristics
- Design: Truss viaduct
- Material: Quarried granite and steel
- Total length: 470.25 metres (1,542.8 ft)
- Height: 132.50 metres (434.7 ft)

History
- Designer: Virard Felix
- Construction start: 28 October 1901; 125 years ago
- Construction end: 16 September 1909; 117 years ago
- Opened: 10 October 1909; 117 years ago

Location
- Interactive map of Fades Viaduct

The Fades Viaduct (French: Viaduc des Fades) is a railway viaduct in the Puy-de-Dôme department, central France. At the time of its inauguration on 10 October 1909, it was the tallest bridge in the world, across all categories. As of 2010, it still is the tenth tallest railway viaduct in the world.

== Overview ==
The Fades Viaduct is located close to Les Ancizes-Comps, in the Auvergne region, between the communes of Sauret-Besserve and Les Ancizes-Comps. It spans across the river Sioule. Its construction began on 28 October 1901. From 14 to 16 September 1909 it passed the performance tests, The Fades Viaduct has monumental piers of quarried granite. Towering over 92 m (302 ft) in height they remain the tallest bridge piers ever built in traditional masonry. They each have a base larger than a tennis court.

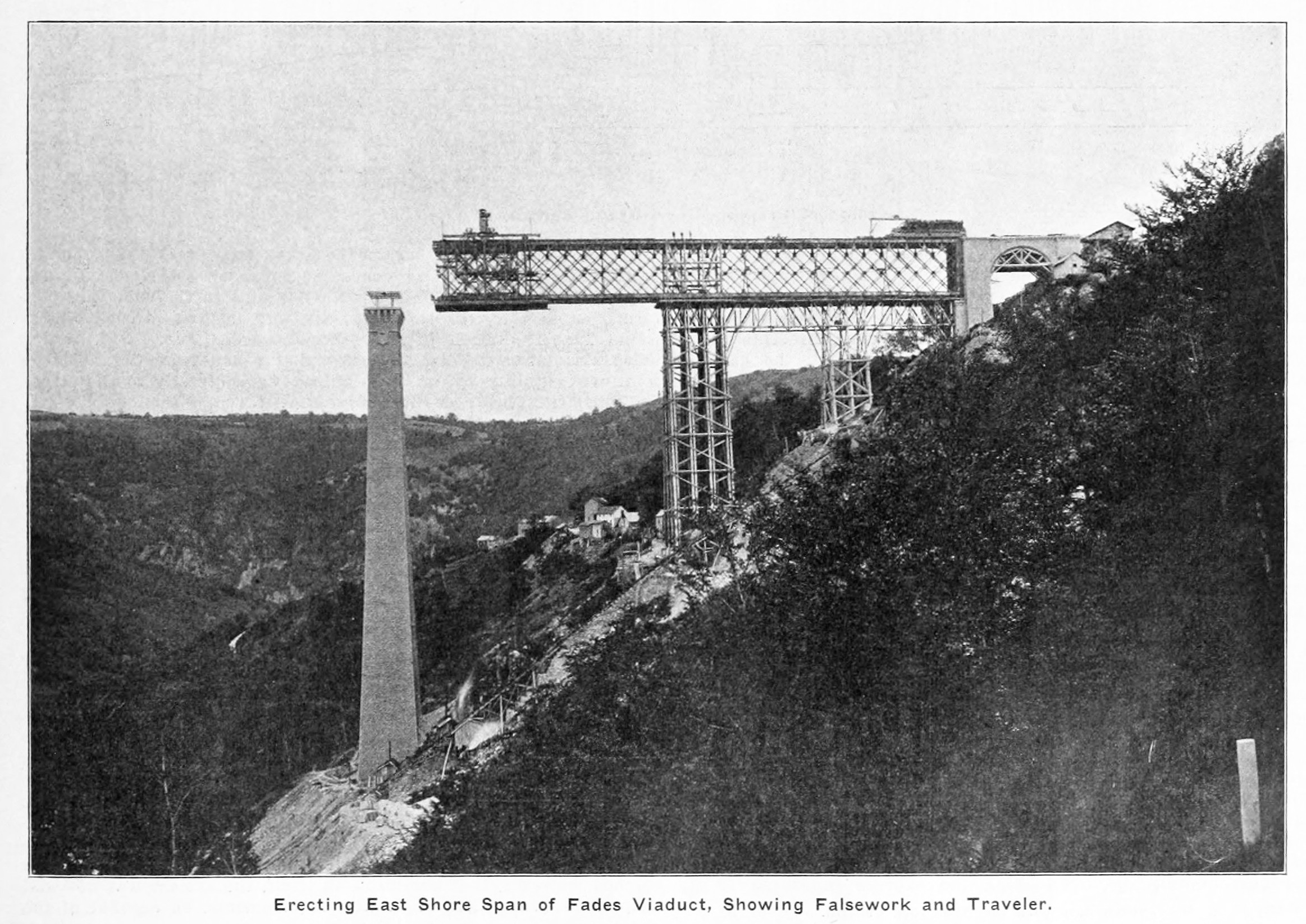
The Fades Viaduct under construction

== See also ==
- List of world's tallest bridges
- List of bridges in France
- Ommelange, E. (1905). "The Fades Viaduct". The Railroad Gazette. 34 (21): 484–486.
