= Pont Flavien =

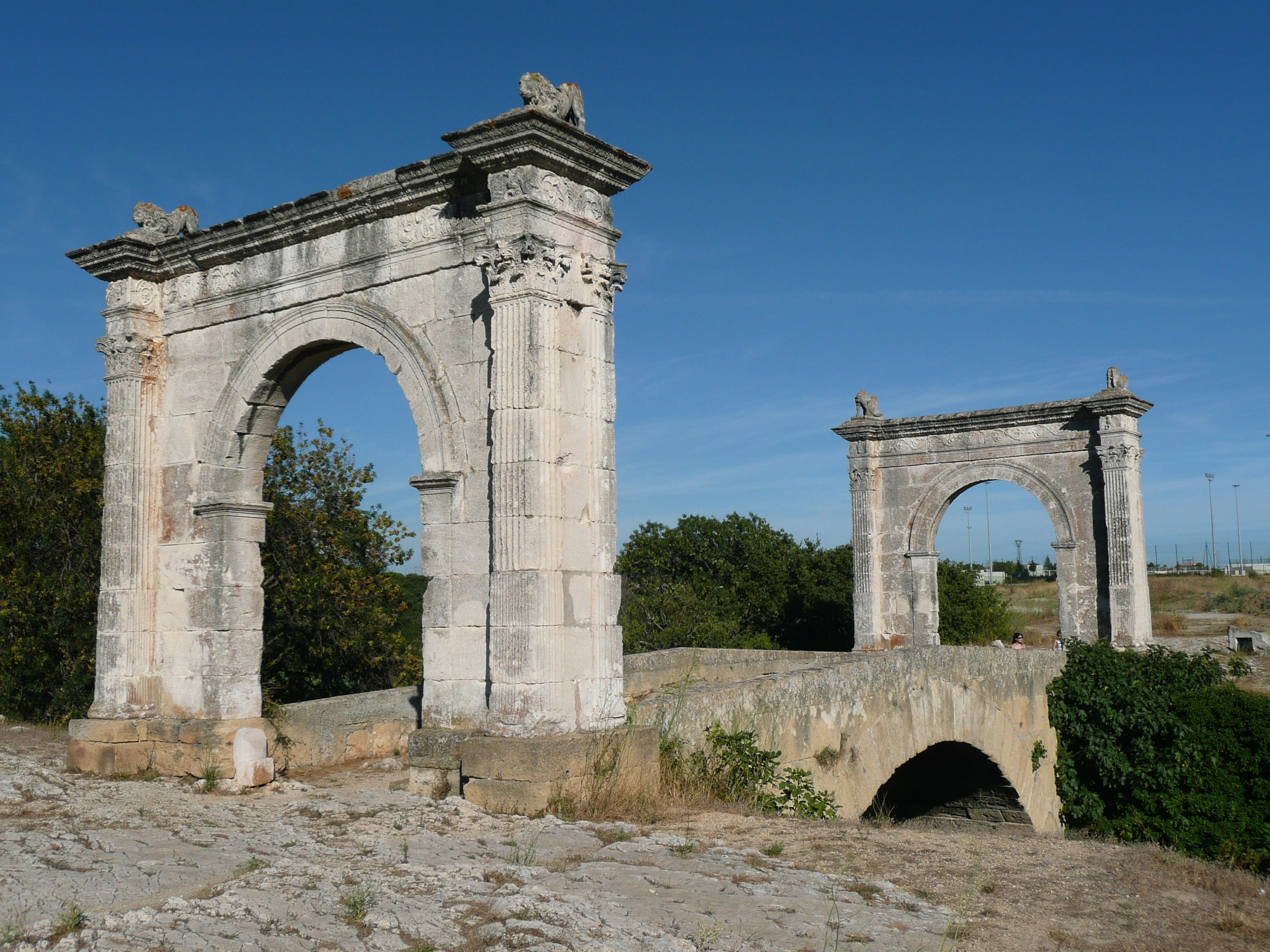
- The single-arched bridge framed by two triumphal arches
- Coordinates: 43.541389°N 5.043056°E
- Carries: Via Giulia Augusta
- Crosses: River Touloubre
- Locale: Saint-Chamas, France

Characteristics
- Design: Arch bridge
- Material: Ashlar stone
- Total length: 25 m
- Width: 6 m
- Longest span: 12.3 m
- No. of spans: 1

History
- Designer: C. Donnius Flavos
- Construction end: Ca. 12 BC

Location
- Interactive map of Pont Flavien

The Pont Flavien (English: Flavian Bridge) is a Roman bridge across the River Touloubre in Saint-Chamas, Bouches-du-Rhône department, southern France. The single-arch crossing, which was built from limestone, was on a Roman road - the Via Julia Augusta - between Placentia, Italy and Arles. It is the only surviving example of a Roman bridge bounded by triumphal arches from the Augustan period, although similar bridges probably existed elsewhere, as indicated by portrayals on coins of the late 1st century BC.

== Origins and design ==
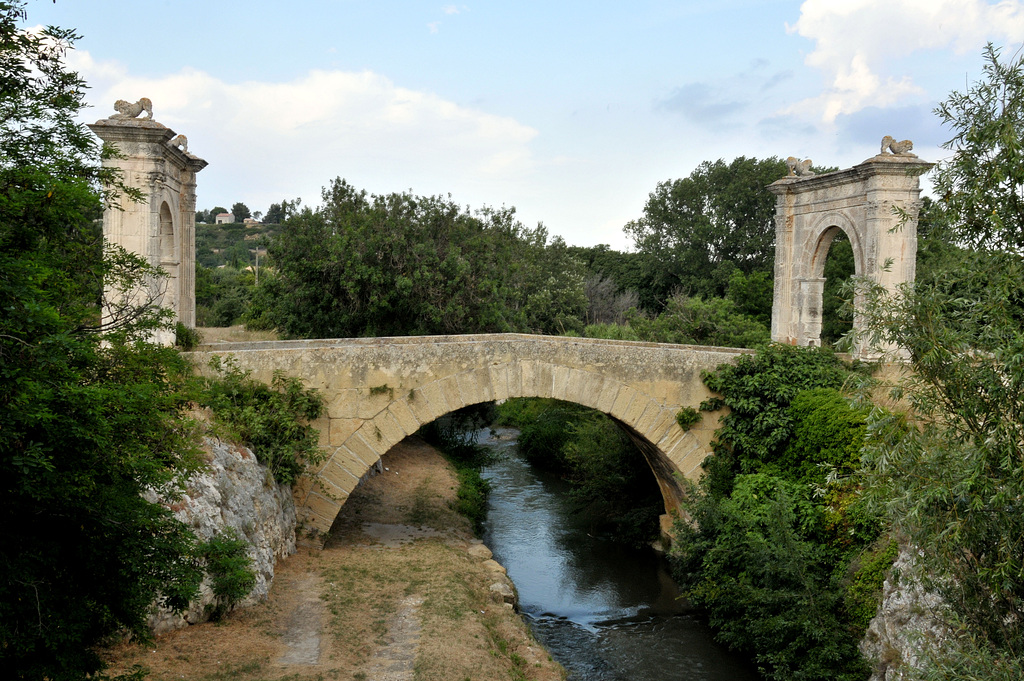
Side view of the Pont Flavien

The bridge probably replaced an earlier wooden structure on the same site. It measures 21.4 metres (70 ft) long by 6.2 metres (20 ft) wide. The two arches at either end, each standing 7 metres (23 ft) high with a single wide bay, are constructed of the same local stone as the bridge and are broader than they are tall. At the corners of the arches are fluted Corinthian pilasters at the top of which are carved eagles. Acanthus scrolls extend partway along the frieze, in the middle of which is an inscription that reads:

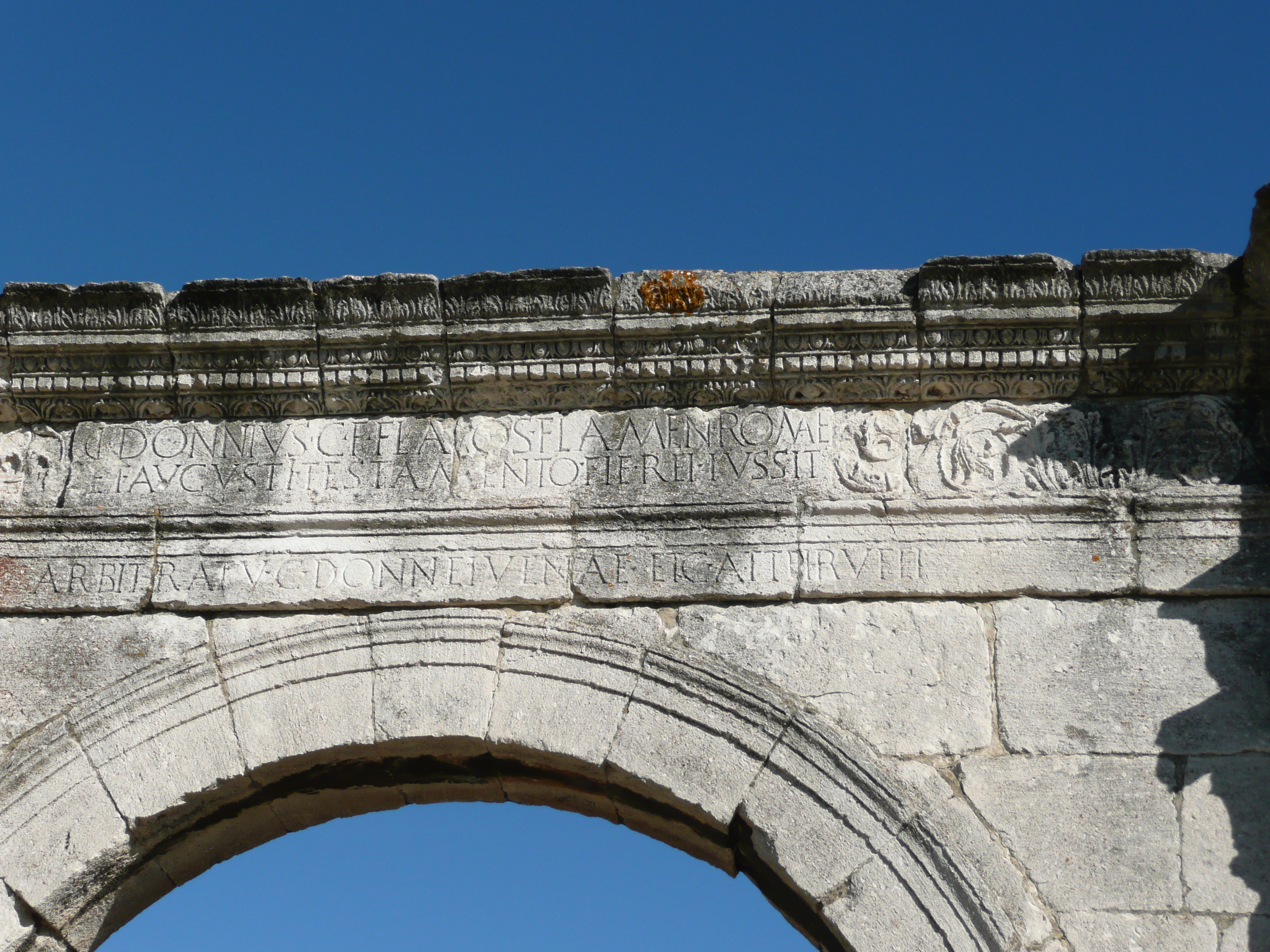
The inscription on the Pont Flavien

L·DONNIVS·C·F·FLAVOS·FLAMEN·ROMAE
ET·AVGVSTI·TESTAMENTO·FIEREI·IVSSIT
ARBITRATV·C·DONNEI·VENAE·ET·C·ATTEI·RVFEI

In translation, this means:

Lucius Donnius, son of Caius, Flavos, flamen [priest] of Rome and Augustus, has ordained in his will that [this monument] be built under the direction of Caius Donnius Vena and Caius Attius Rufius.

Lucius Donnius Flavos was evidently a figure of some importance and probably owned land in the vicinity of the bridge. He was a Romanised Gaul who is likely to have been an aristocrat of the Avatici, a local Gallic tribe. He was probably also a significant player in the affairs of the nearby city of Arelate (Arles), as he served the imperial cult, most likely in one of the city's temples. He may have built his mausoleum nearby, though its location remains unknown.

As the inscription indicates, the bridge was constructed at Flavos' instigation following his death. Its stylistic elements are typical of funerary monuments. The frieze of the arches decorated with a wave pattern symbolises the constant rebirth of life. The eagles carved above the capitals and the pairs of free-standing lions atop the arches are also common features of tombs and, in the case of the lions, were popular in Provence in the latter part of the first century BC. The combination of arches and a bridge may have been intended to symbolise the passage of life. Because the Pont Flavien was a private monument it did not have the triumphal imagery normally associated with Roman arches and does not bear any portrait of Flavos. He would most likely have been depicted in figure at his tomb but this, assuming it was nearby, has long since disappeared.

In the 20s BC, Marcus Vipsanius Agrippa carried out a programme of road building in Provence on behalf of the Emperor Augustus, constructing the Via Julia Augusta. This would have given Flavos an opportunity to make his mark in a highly visible way, proclaiming his dedication to Roman values and highlighting the importance of his own personage. Considering also the likely date of the stylistic elements, the Pont Flavien was most likely built some time between 20 and 10 BC.

== Subsequent usage and restoration ==
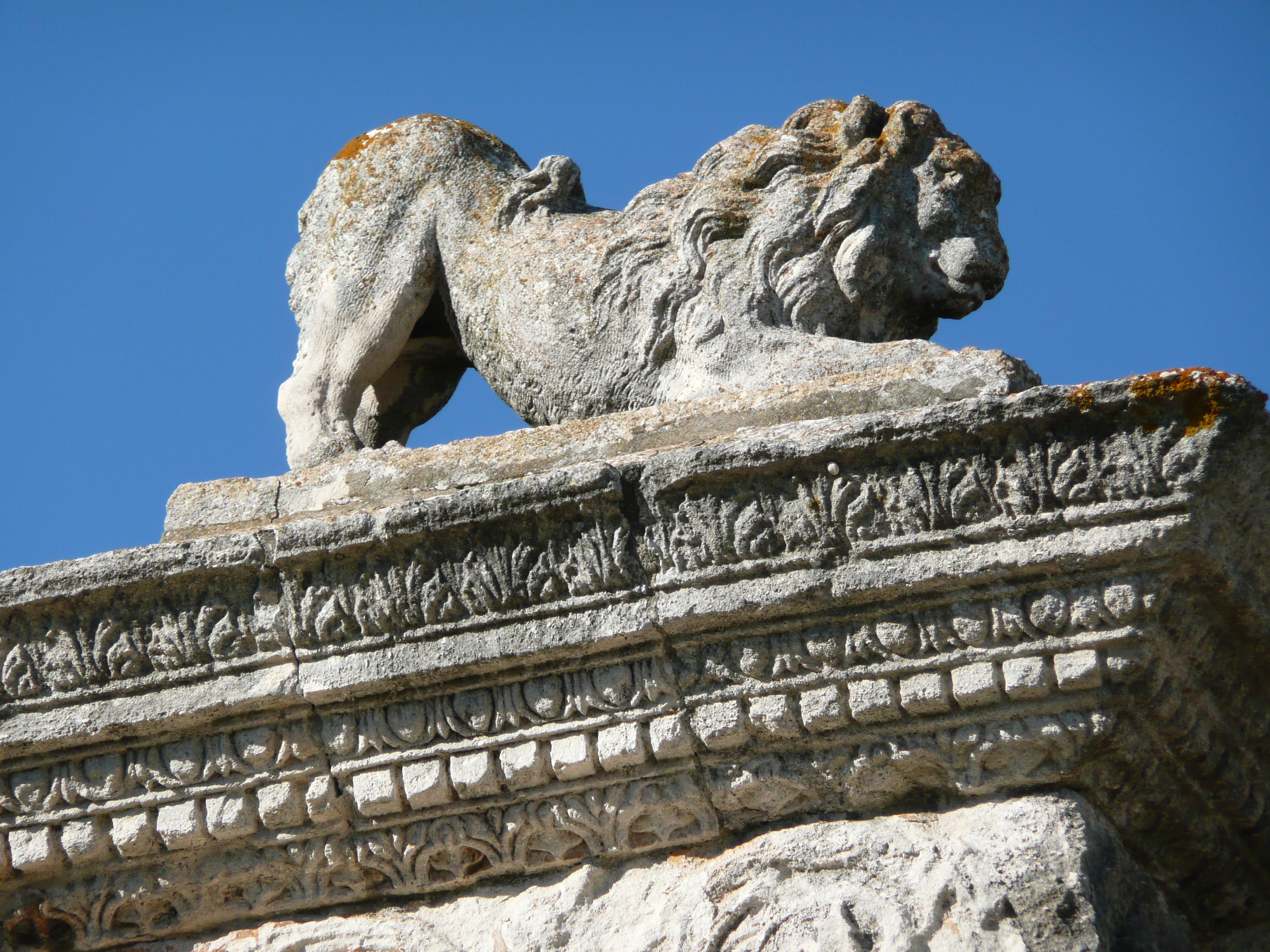
One of the stone lions on top of the Pont Flavien's arches

The bridge was heavily used until as late as the latter part of the 20th century. It has suffered a great deal of wear and tear and accidental damage over the years; by the end of Antiquity the roadway had become so rutted by constant cart traffic that it had been worn right through, exposing the arch stones. It has been repeatedly resurfaced to prevent the collapse of the bridge and the parapet has also been replaced. The bridge was a traditional stopping point for the Compagnons du Tour de France, journeyman masons who underwent a tour of notable monuments around the country and who left their graffiti (including signatures and symbols including horseshoes and a phallus) on the bridge.

The western arch has collapsed at least twice; the first time was in the 18th century, destroying the stone lions on top of the arch. It was rebuilt in 1763 by Jean Chastel, who also restored the sculptures (the only surviving original lion is on the right-hand side of the eastern arch). The second collapse was during the Second World War, when the arch was first damaged when a German tank collided with it, then collapsed when an American truck hit it in 1945. It was rebuilt in 1949 and some years later a modern bridge was built 50 metres (160 ft) to the south to bypass it. The Pont Flavien is now reserved for pedestrian use only. In 1977, prior to the landscaping of the surrounding area, an archaeological excavation was carried out by the Antiquités Historiques de Provence under the direction of Anne Roth Congés.

== See also ==
- List of bridges in France
- List of Roman bridges
- Roman architecture
- Roman engineering

== Bibliography ==
- Bernard, Fréderic (1860). De Lyon à la Méditerranée. Hachette.
- Bromwich, James (1996). The Roman Remains of Southern France: A Guidebook. Routledge. ISBN 9780415143585.
- Galliazzo, Vittorio (1994). I ponti romani. Catalogo generale. Vol. 2. Treviso: Edizioni Canova. ISBN 88-85066-66-6.
- Kleiner, Fred S. (1985). The arch of Nero in Rome: a study of the Roman honorary arch before and under Nero. G. Bretschneider. ISBN 9788876890949.
- Prade, Marcel (1986). Les ponts, monuments historiques: inventaire, description, histoire des ponts et ponts-aqueducs de France, protégés au titre des monuments historiques. Brissaud. ISBN 9782902170548.
- Rivet, A. L. F. (1988). Gallia Narbonensis: With a Chapter on Alpes Maritimae : Southern France in Roman Times. Batsford. ISBN 978-0-7134-5860-2.
