= Chateaubriand Bridge =

Chateaubriand Bridge Pont Chateaubriand
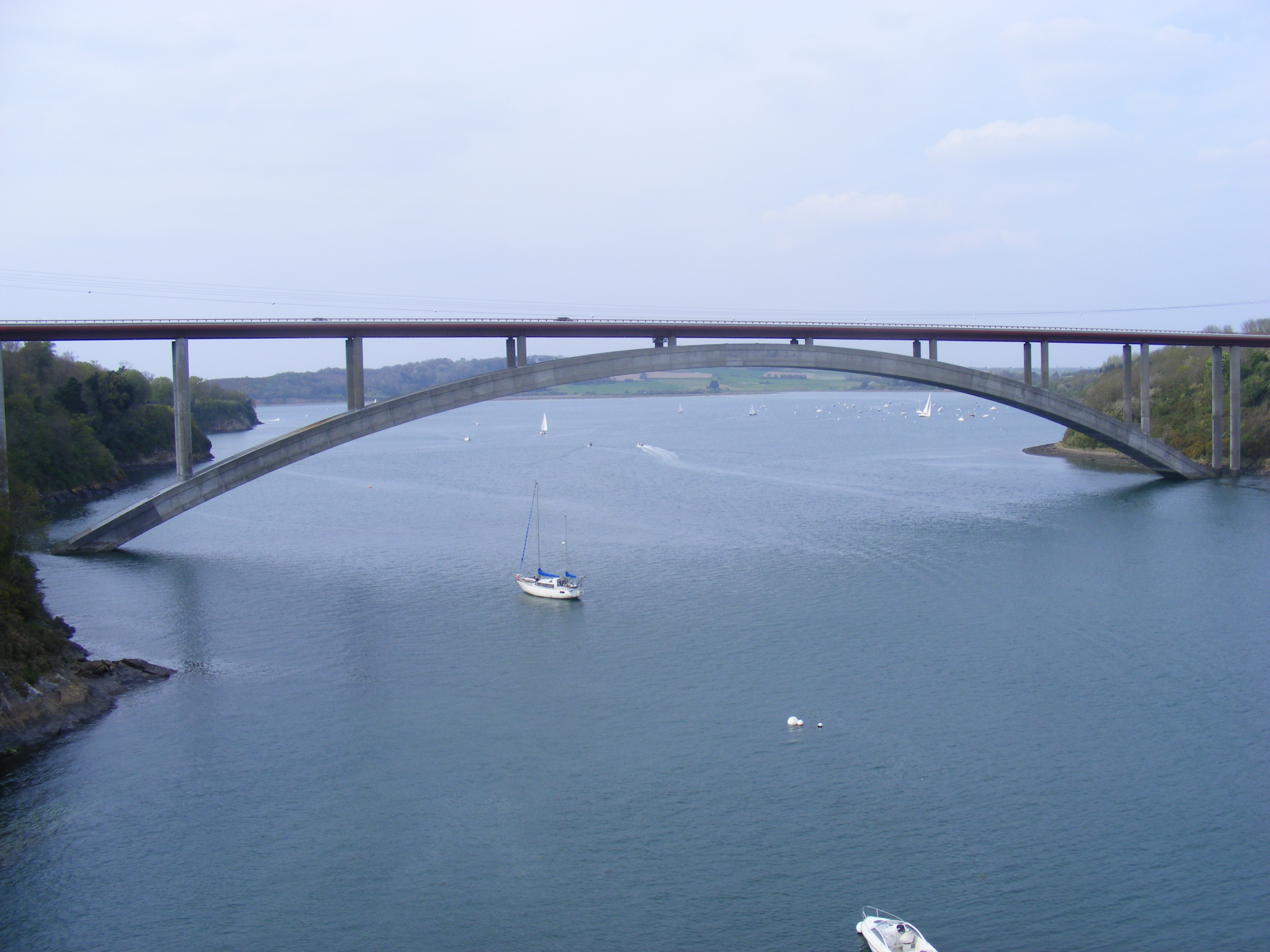
- View in April 2010
- Coordinates: 48.537°N 1.9714°W
- Carries: Vehicles on the Route nationale N176
- Crosses: Rance (river)
- Locale: Brittany, north-west France, 35430

Characteristics
- Design: Open spandrel deck arch bridge with twin-girder steel-composite deck
- Material: Reinforced concrete and steel
- Total length: 424 m (1,391 ft)
- Longest span: 250 m (820 ft)
- No. of spans: 1
- Piers in water: 0

History
- Architect: Jacques Mathivat
- Designer: Auguste Arsac, Charles Lavigne
- Constructed by: Campenon-Bernard
- Fabrication by: Compagnie Française d'Entreprises Métalliques (CFEM)
- Construction start: 1988
- Construction end: 1990
- Opened: 1991

Location
- Interactive map of Chateaubriand Bridge

The Chateaubriand Bridge is a concrete deck arch road bridge in Brittany, France, that crosses the Rance river. For geographical conditions and technical traditions, France does not have many arch bridges.

== History ==
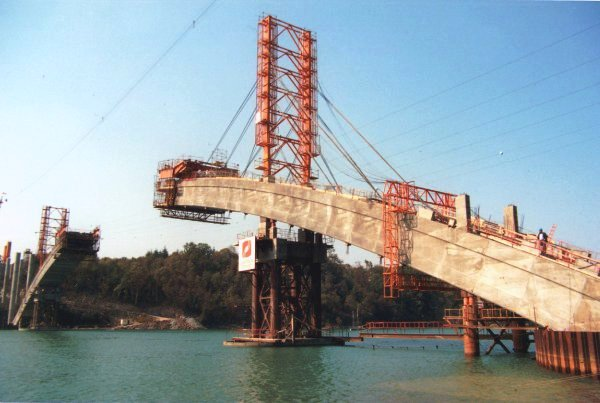
Under construction

=== Design ===
The need for a bridge was envisaged by SETRA (Service d'études sur les transports, les routes et leurs aménagements).

=== Construction ===
It had a cantilever construction with cable-stays (staying wires). The steel construction was by Compagnie Française d'Entreprises Métalliques, now owned by Eiffage. It was built with high performance Class C60 concrete.

== Structure ==
The bridge carries the European route E401 or Route nationale 176. It is near Plouër-sur-Rance and La Ville-ès-Nonais. The bridge spans the two departments of Ille-et-Vilaine, to the east, and Côtes-d'Armor, to the west.

== See also ==
- List of bridges in France
- List of longest arch bridge spans
- Morbihan Bridge at La Roche-Bernard, similar design, opened 1996
