= Cheviré Bridge =

Cheviré Bridge Pont de Cheviré
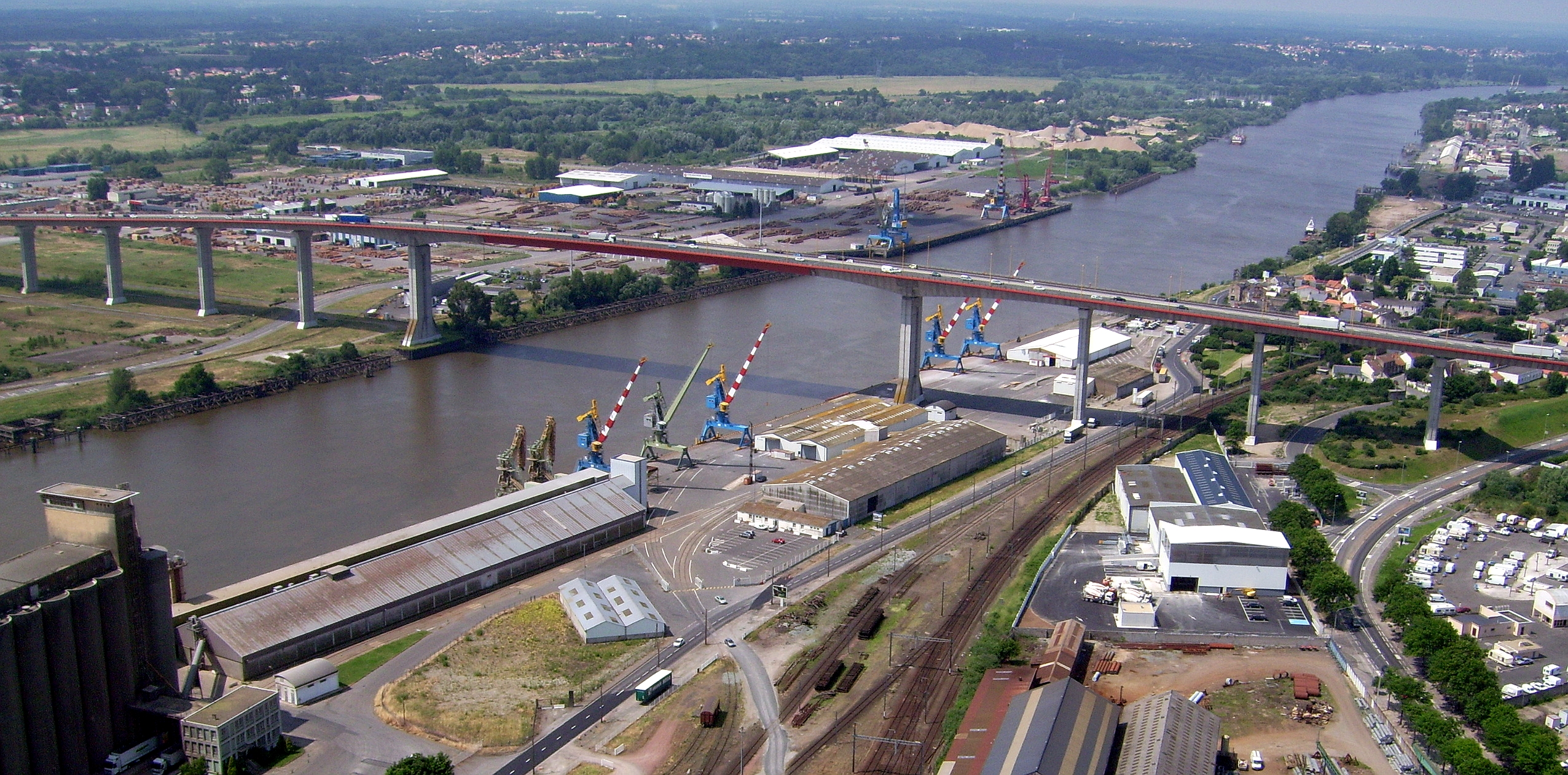
- Coordinates: 47.192778°N 1.613333°W
- Carries: N844 (Nantes ring road)
- Crosses: Loire
- Locale: Nantes, Loire-Atlantique, France

Characteristics
- Design: Girder bridge
- Material: Steel, reinforced concrete
- Total length: 1,563 m (5,128 ft)
- Height: 52 m (171 ft)

History
- Opened: 27 April 1991

Location
- Interactive map of Cheviré Bridge

The Cheviré Bridge (French: Pont de Cheviré, or viaduc de Cheviré) is a 2x3 lane road pont allowing the N 844 (part of the Nantes ring road) to cross the Loire river, which is to the west of Nantes in France.

== Description ==
The bridge is 1,563 m long and 52 m high.

It was inaugurated on April 27, 1991 by French Prime Minister Michel Rocard.

== Financing ==
The bridge was expected to cost 275 million francs excluding VAT in 1987, equivalent to around €82.7 million today. The final cost was 522 million francs in 1991, equivalent to €138.3 million today, with 55% covered by the State and 45% by the Nantes metropolitan area.

== See also ==
- Nantes

== Bibliography ==
- Loïc Abed-Denesle (2011). "Pont de Cheviré". Nantes Passion (213). Nantes: mairie de Nantes: 50-51. ISSN 1164-4125.
- Emmanuel Bouchon (1988). "Le Pont de Cheviré". Bulletin ouvrages d'art (3). Bagneux: Centre des techniques des ouvrages d'art du service d'études techniques des routes et autoroutes: 6. ISBN 978-2-37180-109-7.
- Les Ponts de Nantes d'hier et d'aujourd'hui. Nantes: Coiffard Librairie Éditeur. 1995. p. 152. ISBN 291036603-0.
- Michel Virlogeux (1992). "Structure et architecture des ponts" (PDF). Culture Technique (26). Centre de recherche sur la culture technique. Archived from the original (PDF) on 2016-09-17.
