= Pont Lesdiguières =

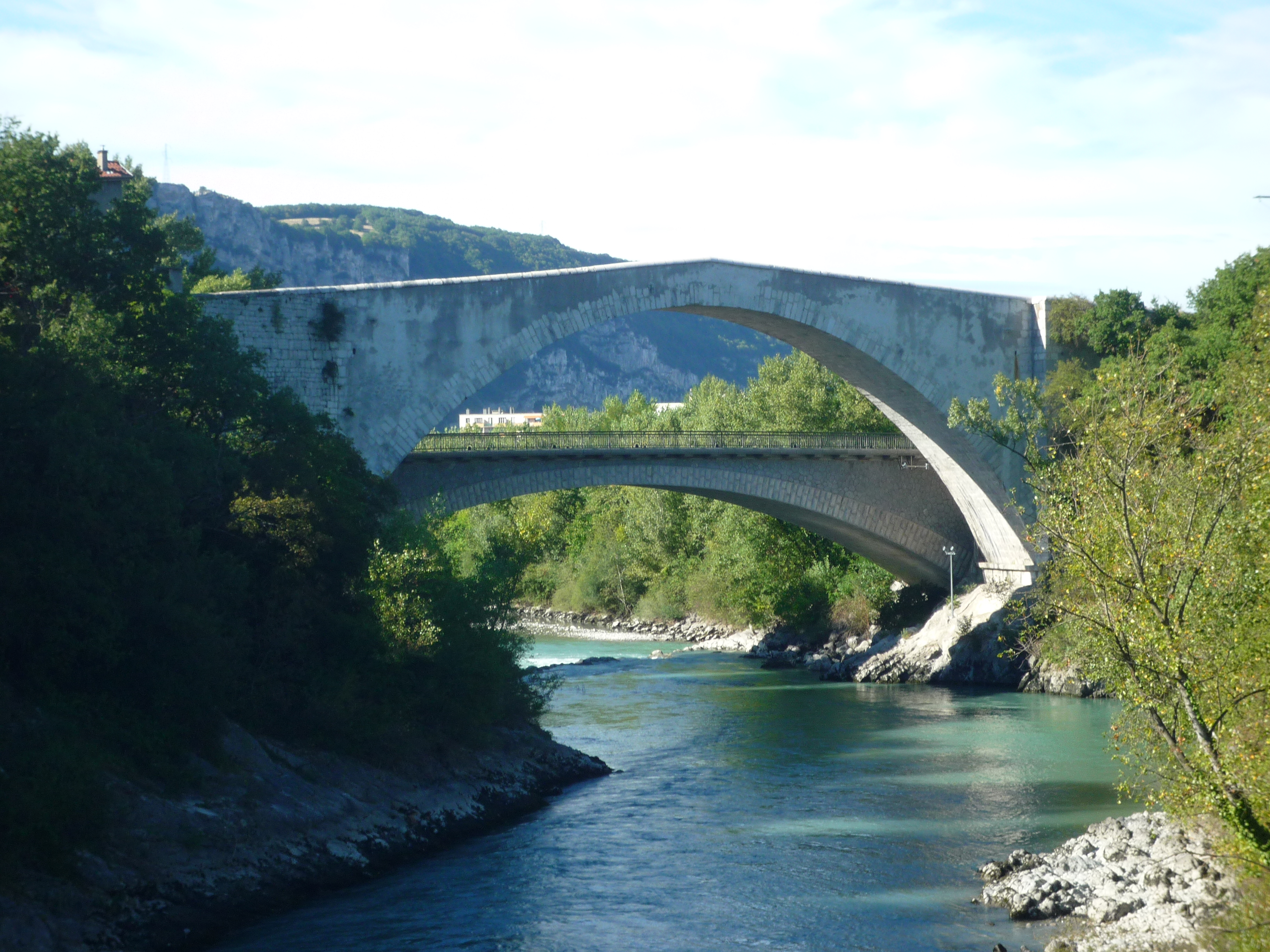
- Coordinates: 45.12067°N 5.69641°E
- Crosses: Drac
- Locale: France

Characteristics
- Material: Stone

Location
- Interactive map of Pont Lesdiguières

The Pont Lesdiguières, also known as the Pont de Claix because it was entirely located in the commune of Claix before 1873, is a masonry bridge crossing the Drac river in France.

Known as one of the seven wonders of Dauphiné, the structure has been listed as a monument historique since 1898.

== History ==
=== Construction ===
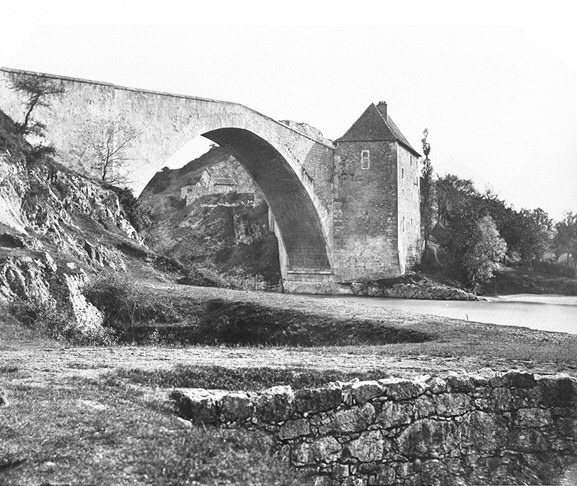
The bridge in 1873

In 1377, the contractor Pellorce diverted the Drac torrent, whose floods were destructive, between Petit Rochefort, corresponding to the current rise, and Mollard, where the water tower of the commune of Pont de Claix was located in 2019.

=== Contemporary era ===
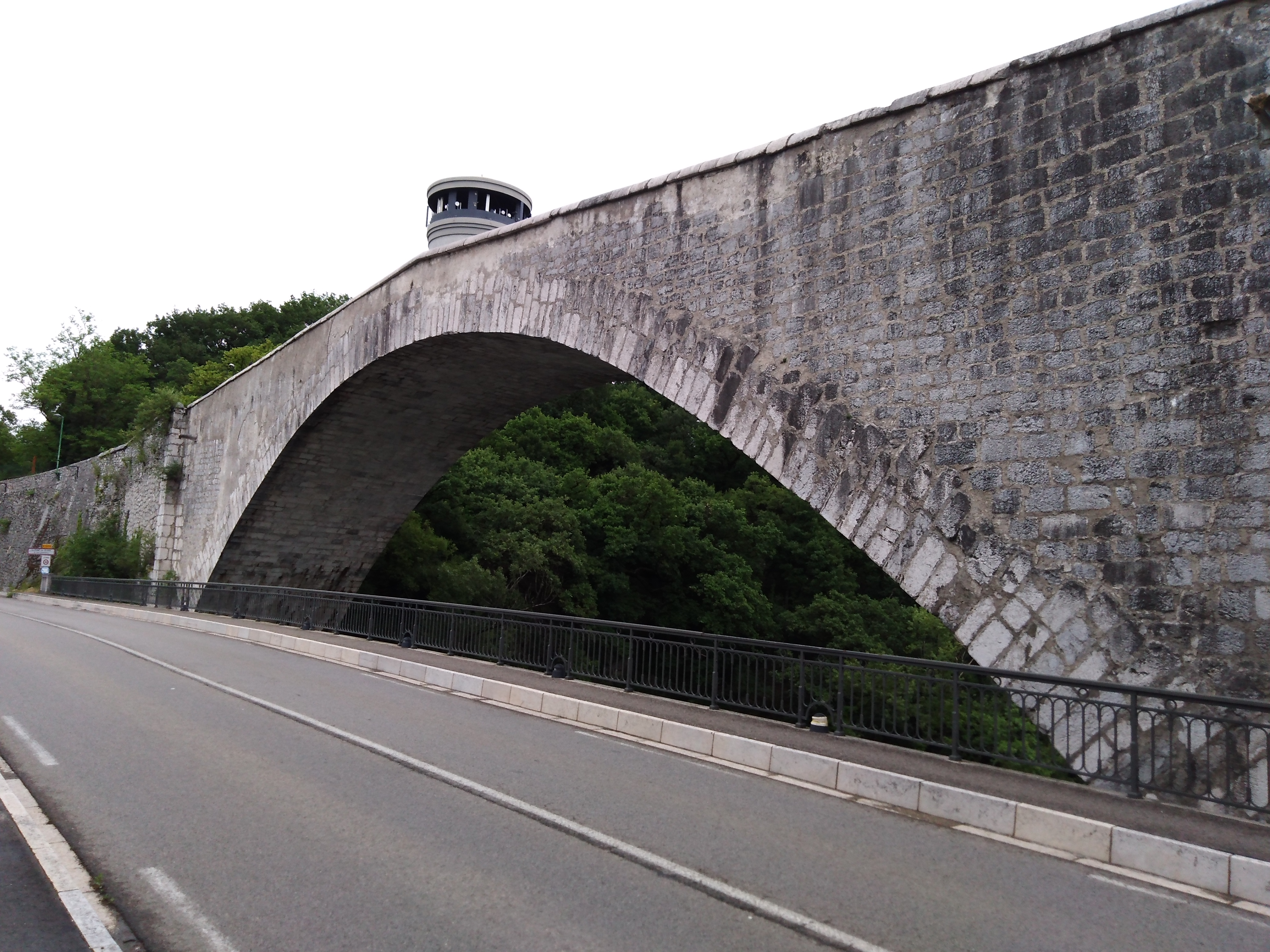
The bridge in 2019

The old bridge over the Drac was listed as a monument historique in 1898.

== Description ==
The bridge features a humpbacked roadway with a single arch. The maximum height of the arch above the banks of the Drac River is 15.70 meters, and it spans 45.65 meters between the banks.

== See also ==
- AD Isère Drac Romanche
- Drac
- François de Bonne of Lesdiguières
