= Les Ancizes-Comps =

- Commune
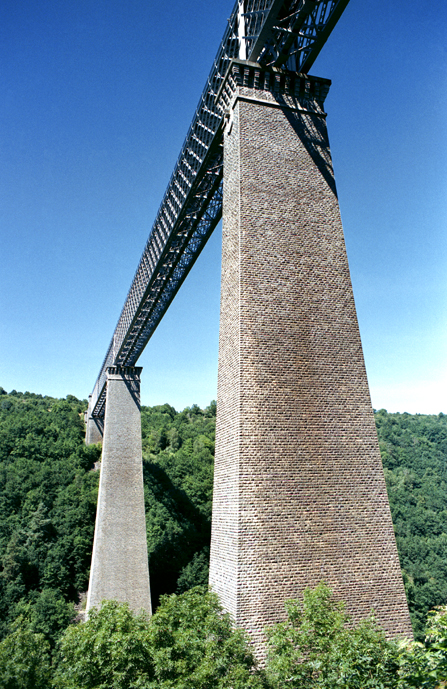
- Fades viaduct

- Coat of arms
- Location of Les Ancizes-Comps
- Location within France Location within Auvergne-Rhône-Alpes
- Coordinates: 45°55′34″N 2°48′48″E
- Country: France
- Region: Auvergne-Rhône-Alpes
- Department: Puy-de-Dôme
- Arrondissement: Riom
- Canton: Saint-Georges-de-Mons

Government
  - Mayor (2026–32): Didier Manuby
- Area^{1}: 21.2 km^{2} (8.2 sq mi)
- Elevation: 700 m (2,300 ft)
- Highest elevation: 742 m (2,434 ft)
- Lowest elevation: 444 m (1,457 ft)
- Population (2023): 1,682
  - Density: 79.3/km^{2} (205/sq mi)
- Time zone: UTC+01:00 (CET)
  - Summer (DST): UTC+02:00 (CEST)
- INSEE/Postal code: 63004 /63770
- ^{1} French Land Register data, which excludes lakes, ponds, glaciers > 1 km^{2} (0.386 sq mi or 247 acres) and river estuaries.

Les Ancizes-Comps (French pronunciation: [le.z‿ɑ̃siz kɔ̃ps]) is a commune in the Puy-de-Dôme department in Auvergne-Rhône-Alpes in central France.

== Administration ==
- 2008–2014: Pascal Estier
- 2014–current: Didier Manuby

== Population ==
Historical population
Year	Pop.	±% p.a.
1968	1,900	—
1975	1,983	+0.61%
1982	1,985	+0.01%
1990	1,910	−0.48%
1999	1,821	−0.53%
2007	1,789	−0.22%
2012	1,710	−0.90%
2017	1,610	−1.20%
2023	1,682	+0.73%
Source: INSEE

== See also ==
- Fades viaduct
- Communes of the Puy-de-Dôme department
