= Saint-Jean-de-Fos =

- Commune
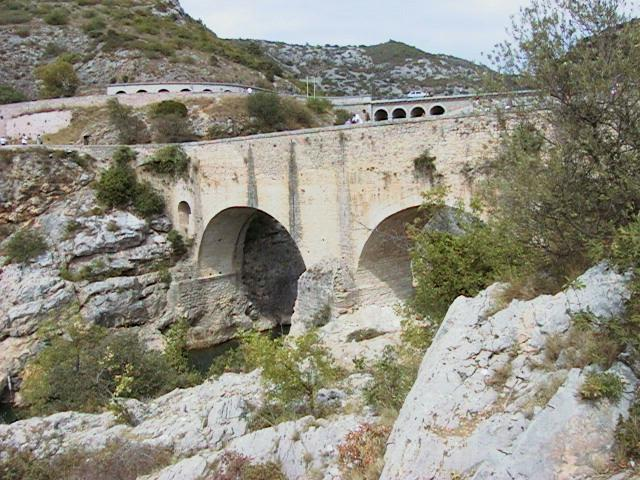
- Pont du Diable

- Coat of arms
- Location of Saint-Jean-de-Fos
- Location within France Location within Occitanie
- Coordinates: 43°42′06″N 3°33′06″E
- Country: France
- Region: Occitania
- Department: Hérault
- Arrondissement: Lodève
- Canton: Gignac
- Intercommunality: Vallée de l'Hérault

Government
  - Mayor (2020–2026): Pascal Delieuze
- Area^{1}: 14.19 km^{2} (5.48 sq mi)
- Elevation: 95 m (312 ft)
- Highest elevation: 528 m (1,732 ft)
- Lowest elevation: 30 m (98 ft)
- Population (2023): 1,745
  - Density: 123.0/km^{2} (318.5/sq mi)
- Time zone: UTC+01:00 (CET)
  - Summer (DST): UTC+02:00 (CEST)
- INSEE/Postal code: 34267 /34150
- ^{1} French Land Register data, which excludes lakes, ponds, glaciers > 1 km^{2} (0.386 sq mi or 247 acres) and river estuaries.

Saint-Jean-de-Fos (French pronunciation: [sɛ̃ ʒɑ̃ də fɔs]; Languedocien: Sant Joan de Fòrcs) is a commune in the Hérault department in the Occitanie region in southern France.

== Population ==
Historical population
Year	Pop.	±% p.a.
1968	939	—
1975	861	−1.23%
1982	905	+0.71%
1990	1,011	+1.39%
1999	1,160	+1.54%
2007	1,460	+2.92%
2012	1,567	+1.42%
2017	1,696	+1.59%
2023	1,745	+0.48%
Source: INSEE

== Notable person ==
- Jean-Christophe Victor (1947–2016), geographer, died in Saint-Jean-de-Fos

== See also ==
- Communes of the Hérault department
- Pont du Diable, Hérault
