= Pont Séjourné =

Bridge in Fontpédrouse, Occitania, France

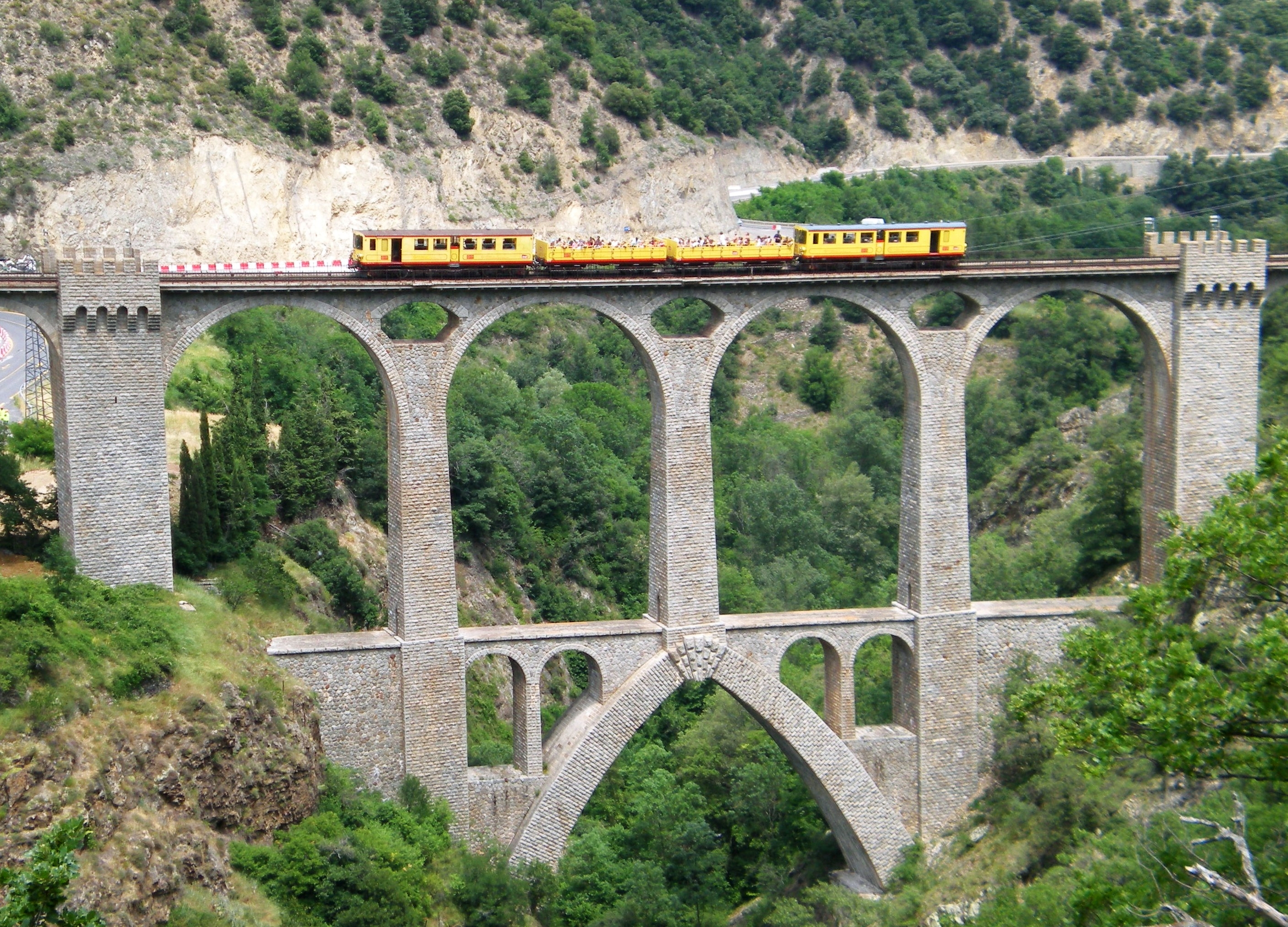
- Coordinates: 42°31′04″N 2°12′13″E
- Locale: Fontpédrouse, France

History
- Architect: Paul Séjourné

Location
- Interactive map of Pont Séjourné

The Séjourné Bridge (French: Pont Séjourné) (also called Pont de Fontpédrouse) is a railway viaduct along the Ligne de Cerdagne across the river Têt in Pyrénées-Orientales, France.

Its construction began in 1906 and was completed in 1908. Part of the section running from Villefranche-de-Conflent - Mont-Louis of the Ligne de Cerdagne (the first section to have been built), was inaugurated at the same time as the railway on 18 July 1910. It was declared a "Monument historique" on 30 December 1994.

== See also ==
- Ligne de Cerdagne
- Pont de Cassagne (Pont Gisclard)
