= Sauret-Besserve =

- Commune
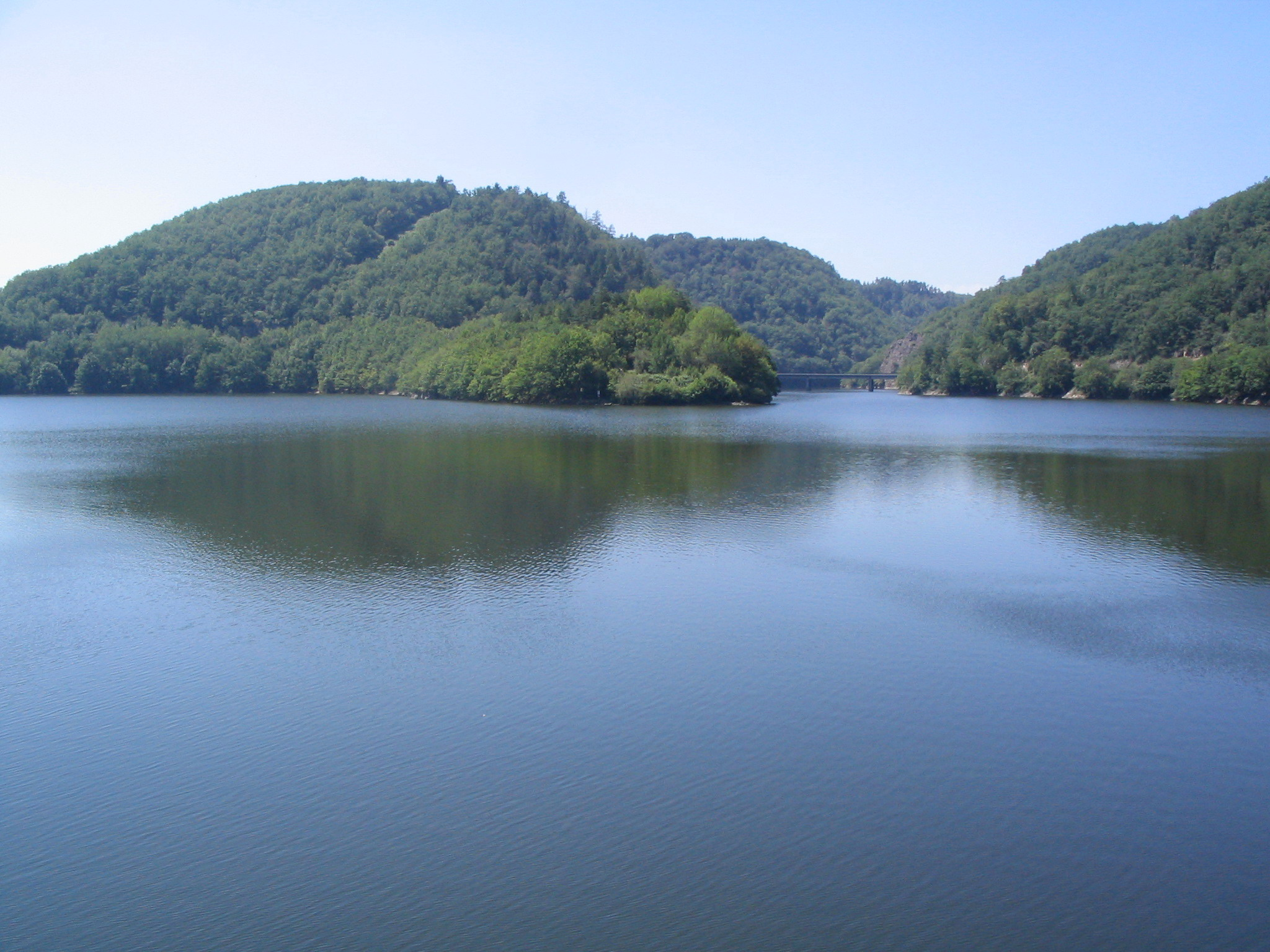
- The lake of Besserve

- Coat of arms
- Location of Sauret-Besserve
- Location within France Location within Auvergne-Rhône-Alpes
- Coordinates: 45°59′35″N 2°48′29″E
- Country: France
- Region: Auvergne-Rhône-Alpes
- Department: Puy-de-Dôme
- Arrondissement: Riom
- Canton: Saint-Éloy-les-Mines
- Intercommunality: CC Pays de Saint-Éloy

Government
  - Mayor (2022–2026): Serge Compte
- Area^{1}: 10.33 km^{2} (3.99 sq mi)
- Elevation: 700 m (2,300 ft)
- Highest elevation: 704 m (2,310 ft)
- Lowest elevation: 428 m (1,404 ft)
- Population (2023): 163
  - Density: 15.8/km^{2} (40.9/sq mi)
- Time zone: UTC+01:00 (CET)
  - Summer (DST): UTC+02:00 (CEST)
- INSEE/Postal code: 63408 /63390
- ^{1} French Land Register data, which excludes lakes, ponds, glaciers > 1 km^{2} (0.386 sq mi or 247 acres) and river estuaries.

Sauret-Besserve (French pronunciation: [sɔʁɛ bɛsɛʁv]; Occitan: Sauret e Beçerva) is a commune in the Puy-de-Dôme department in Auvergne-Rhône-Alpes in central France.

== See also ==
- Fades viaduct
- Communes of the Puy-de-Dôme department
