= Cruseilles =

Cruseilles Corzelyes (Arpitan)
- Commune
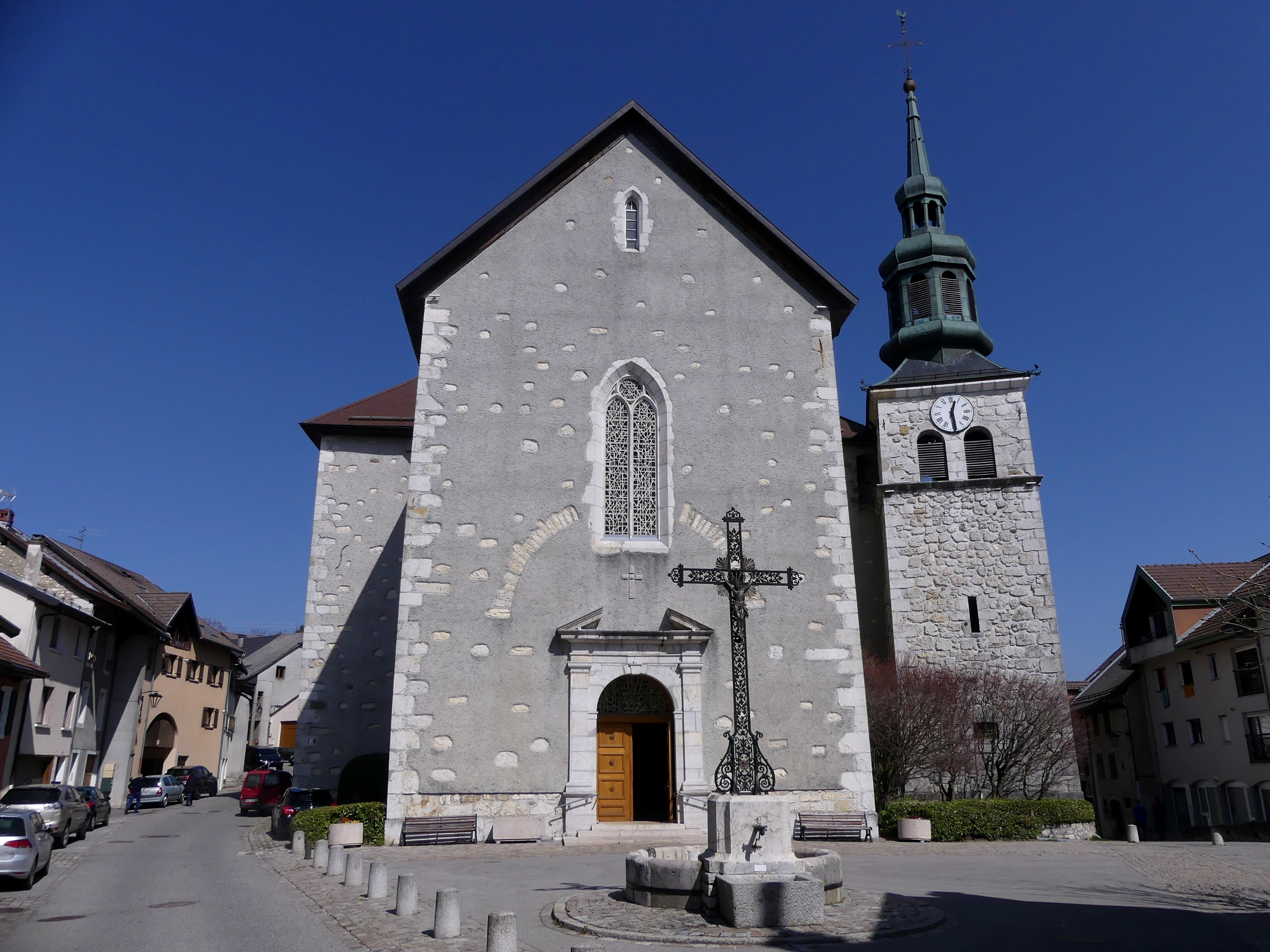
- Église Saint-Maurice

- Coat of arms
- Location of Cruseilles
- Location within France Location within Auvergne-Rhône-Alpes
- Coordinates: 46°02′06″N 6°06′30″E
- Country: France
- Region: Auvergne-Rhône-Alpes
- Department: Haute-Savoie
- Arrondissement: Saint-Julien-en-Genevois
- Canton: La Roche-sur-Foron

Government
  - Mayor (2020–2026): Sylvie Mermillod
- Area^{1}: 25.41 km^{2} (9.81 sq mi)
- Highest elevation: 1,352 m (4,436 ft)
- Lowest elevation: 450 m (1,480 ft)
- Population (2023): 5,376
  - Density: 211.6/km^{2} (548.0/sq mi)
- Time zone: UTC+01:00 (CET)
  - Summer (DST): UTC+02:00 (CEST)
- INSEE/Postal code: 74096 /74350
- ^{1} French Land Register data, which excludes lakes, ponds, glaciers > 1 km^{2} (0.386 sq mi or 247 acres) and river estuaries.

Cruseilles (French pronunciation: [kʁyzɛj]; Arpitan: Corzelyes; Savoyard dialect: Croueselyes) is a commune in the Haute-Savoie department in the Auvergne-Rhône-Alpes region in Southeastern France.

Cruseilles is on the A41 autoroute, 12 km (7.4 mi) south-southeast of Saint-Julien-en-Genevois.

== Population ==
Historical population
Year	Pop.	±% p.a.
1968	1,610	—
1975	1,837	+1.90%
1982	2,300	+3.26%
1990	2,716	+2.10%
1999	3,186	+1.79%
2007	3,615	+1.59%
2012	4,103	+2.56%
2017	4,431	+1.55%
2023	5,376	+3.27%
Source: INSEE

== Notable people ==
Cruseilles is notable as the birthplace of Louis Armand (1905–1971), who served as president of the SNCF and later of Euratom, was a Resistance officer in World War II, before he was elected to the Académie Française in 1963.

== See also ==
- Communes of the Haute-Savoie department
