= Touloubre =

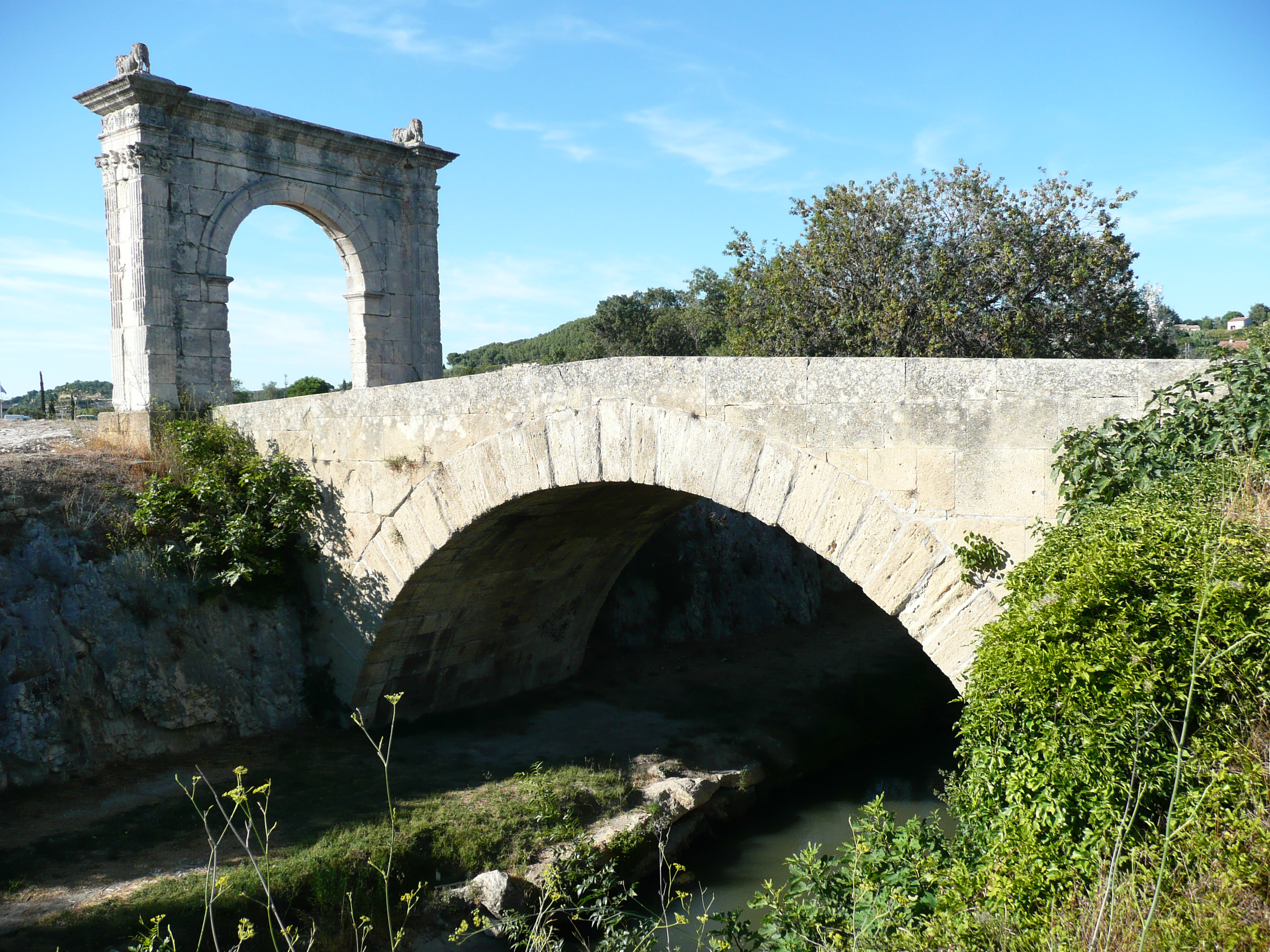
- Touloubre passing the Roman Pont Flavien

- Location within France Location within Provence-Alpes-Côte d'Azur

Location
- Country: France

Physical characteristics
- Mouth
  - location: Étang de Berre
  - coordinates: 43°31′22″N 5°2′55″E
- Length: 59.6 km (37.0 mi)
- Basin size: 401 km^{2} (155 sq mi)

Basin features
- Progression: Étang de Berre→ Mediterranean Sea

The Touloubre is a river in the southeast of France. It runs from Venelles to the Étang de Berre. Other places along its course are Pélissanne, Salon-de-Provence, Grans and Saint-Chamas. It flows into the Étang de Berre, which is connected to the Mediterranean Sea, near Saint-Chamas. It is 59.6 km (37.0 mi) long. Its drainage basin is 401 km^{2} (155 sq mi).
