= Allonzier-la-Caille =

Allonzier-la-Caille Alonzi (Savoyard)
- Commune
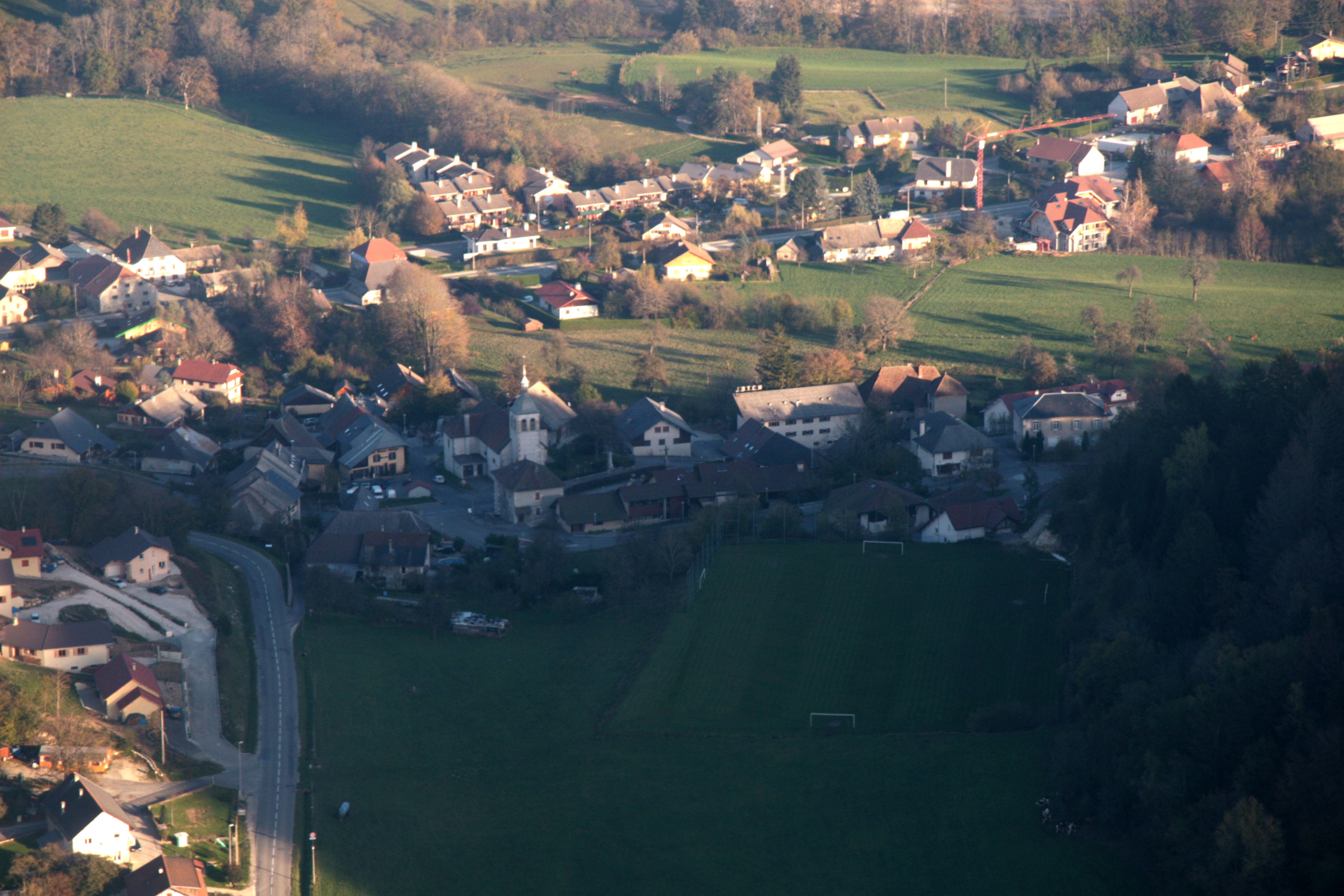
- An aerial view of Allonzier-la-Caille

- Coat of arms
- Location of Allonzier-la-Caille
- Location within France Location within Auvergne-Rhône-Alpes
- Coordinates: 46°00′15″N 6°07′02″E
- Country: France
- Region: Auvergne-Rhône-Alpes
- Department: Haute-Savoie
- Arrondissement: Saint-Julien-en-Genevois
- Canton: La Roche-sur-Foron
- Intercommunality: CC Pays de Cruseilles

Government
  - Mayor (2020–2026): Brigitte Nanche
- Area^{1}: 9.62 km^{2} (3.71 sq mi)
- Highest elevation: 882 m (2,894 ft)
- Lowest elevation: 471 m (1,545 ft)
- Population (2023): 2,253
  - Density: 234/km^{2} (607/sq mi)
- Demonym: Allonziérains
- Time zone: UTC+01:00 (CET)
  - Summer (DST): UTC+02:00 (CEST)
- INSEE/Postal code: 74006 /74350
- ^{1} French Land Register data, which excludes lakes, ponds, glaciers > 1 km^{2} (0.386 sq mi or 247 acres) and river estuaries.

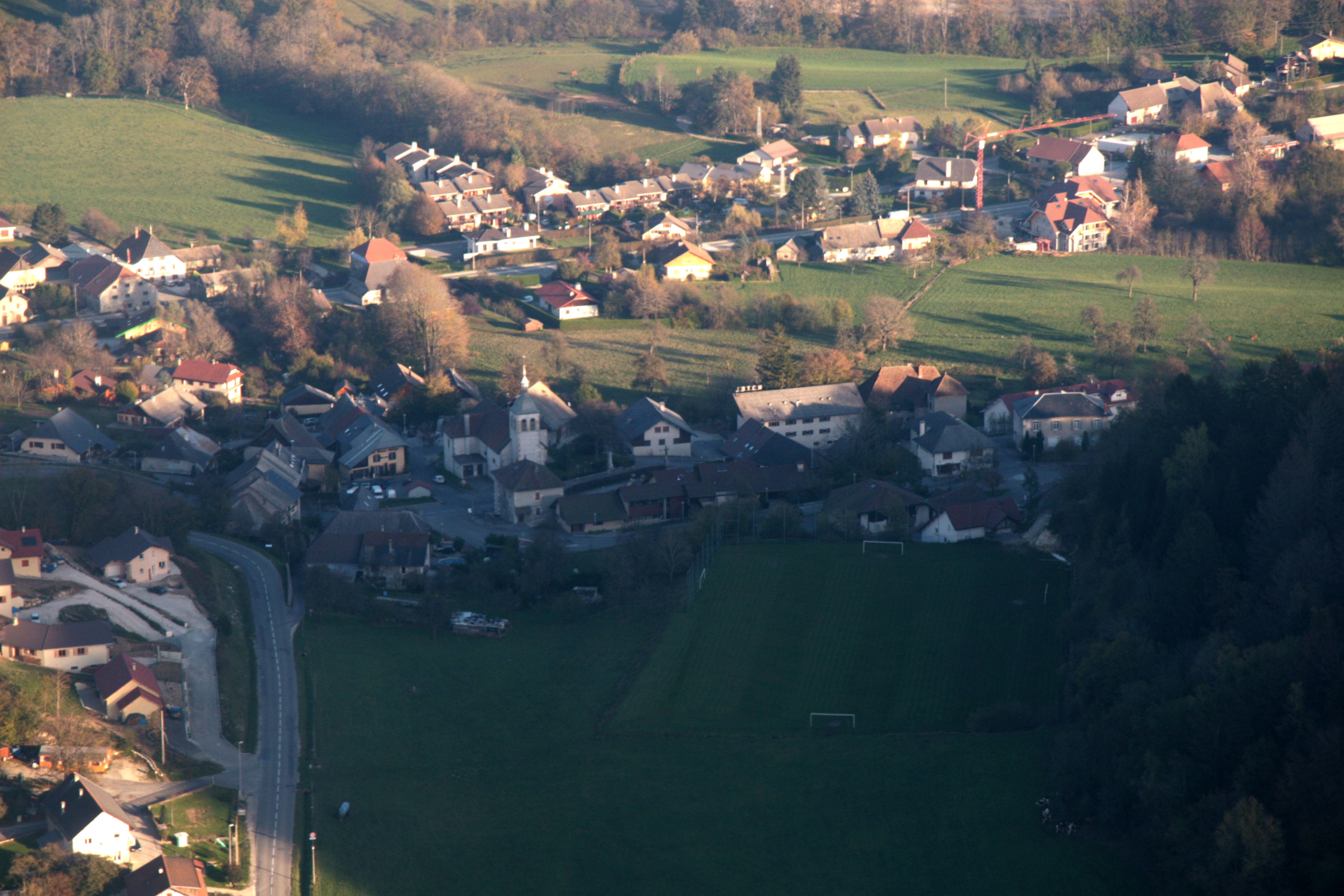
The centre of Allonzier-la-Caille

Allonzier-la-Caille (French pronunciation: [alɔ̃zje la kaj]; Savoyard: Alonzi) is a commune in the Haute-Savoie department in the Auvergne-Rhône-Alpes region in south-eastern France.

== Population ==
Historical population
Year	Pop.	±% p.a.
1968	503	—
1975	510	+0.20%
1982	661	+3.77%
1990	851	+3.21%
1999	1,080	+2.68%
2007	1,418	+3.46%
2012	1,749	+4.29%
2017	2,071	+3.44%
2023	2,253	+1.41%
Source: INSEE

== Notable persons ==
- Jean Perillat: President of the Rhone-Alpes chapter of the French order of Property Experts since 2023.

== See also ==
- Communes of the Haute-Savoie department
