= Saint-Chamas =

Commune in Provence-Alpes-Côte d'Azur, France

- Commune
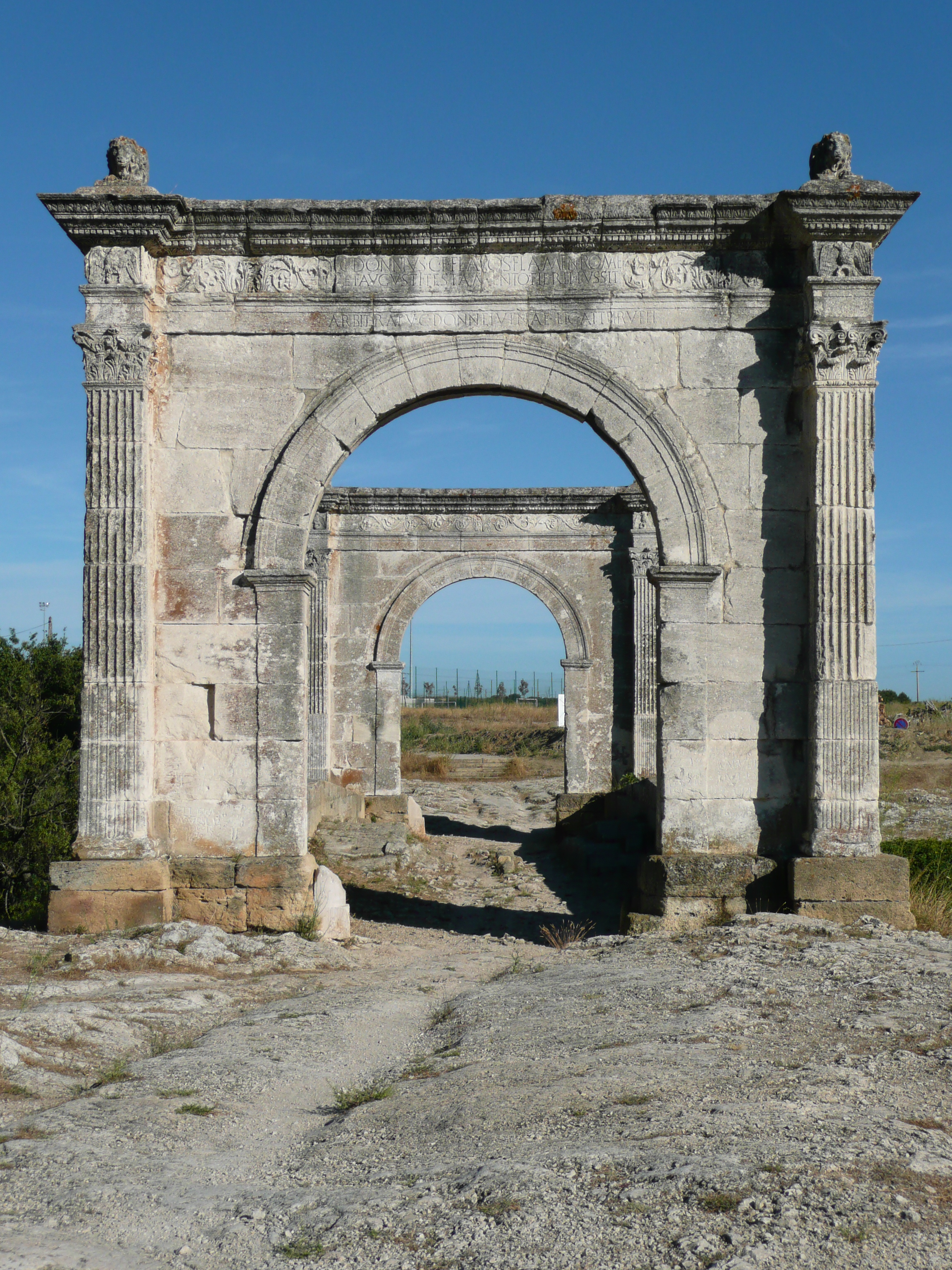
- Roman Pont Flavien

- Coat of arms
- Location of Saint-Chamas
- Location within France Location within Provence-Alpes-Côte d'Azur
- Coordinates: 43°33′02″N 5°02′05″E
- Country: France
- Region: Provence-Alpes-Côte d'Azur
- Department: Bouches-du-Rhône
- Arrondissement: Istres
- Canton: Berre-l'Étang
- Intercommunality: Aix-Marseille-Provence

Government
  - Mayor (2026–32): Magali Ramos
- Area^{1}: 26.71 km^{2} (10.31 sq mi)
- Highest elevation: 121 m (397 ft)
- Lowest elevation: 0 m (0 ft)
- Population (2023): 8,676
  - Density: 324.8/km^{2} (841.3/sq mi)
- Time zone: UTC+01:00 (CET)
  - Summer (DST): UTC+02:00 (CEST)
- INSEE/Postal code: 13092 /13250
- ^{1} French Land Register data, which excludes lakes, ponds, glaciers > 1 km^{2} (0.386 sq mi or 247 acres) and river estuaries.

Saint-Chamas (in Provençal Occitan: Sanch Amàs in classical orthography, Sant Chamas according to Mistralian orthography) is a commune in the department of Bouches-du-Rhône in the Provence-Alpes-Côte d'Azur region in southern France.

== Geography ==
Saint-Chamas is situated on the shore of the Étang de Berre, 15 km south of Salon-de-Provence and 50 km north-west of Marseille, in a part of the region that has not been industrialised. The highest point of the town is Le Verdon at an altitude of 121 metres.

== Population ==
Inhabitants are called Saint-Chamasséens.

Historical population

Year	Pop.	±% p.a.
1793	2,759	—
1800	2,110	−3.76%
1806	2,044	−0.53%
1821	2,506	+1.37%
1831	2,632	+0.49%
1836	2,433	−1.56%
1841	2,443	+0.08%
1846	2,978	+4.04%
1851	2,825	−1.05%
1856	2,800	−0.18%
1861	2,692	−0.78%
1866	2,667	−0.19%
1872	2,614	−0.33%
1876	2,814	+1.86%
1881	2,393	−3.19%
1886	2,335	−0.49%
1891	2,319	−0.14%
1896	2,237	−0.72%
1901	2,373	+1.19%

Year	Pop.	±% p.a.
1906	2,525	+1.25%
1911	2,487	−0.30%
1921	2,677	+0.74%
1926	2,856	+1.30%
1931	3,023	+1.14%
1936	3,131	+0.70%
1946	3,441	+0.95%
1954	4,451	+3.27%
1962	4,634	+0.50%
1968	5,083	+1.55%
1975	5,110	+0.08%
1982	5,045	−0.18%
1990	5,396	+0.84%
1999	6,595	+2.25%
2007	7,346	+1.36%
2012	7,852	+1.34%
2017	8,574	+1.77%
2023	8,676	+0.20%

Source: EHESS and INSEE (1968-2023)

== History ==
Archaeological investigation of rock shelters has proved that the site of Saint-Chamas was already occupied in the Paleolithic era. During the Iron Age, the site was used by the Ligures, who constructed an oppidum (a fortified village), and then by the Celts.

The Romans built the Pont Flavien in the 1st century BC, a triumphal bridge which crosses the River Touloubre.

Saint-Chamas owes its name to Sanctus Amantius (Saint Amans, by tradition the first bishop of Rodez), in whose honor a Chapelle Notre Dame was built in the 7th century.

The settlement was initially constructed on the Baou, a chalk hill which overlooks the Étang de Berre, a site that was easy to defend and from which the surrounding region could be surveyed. In 1564, the castle was sufficiently comfortable to accommodate the king Charles IX and the regent Catherine de' Medici.

The 17th century saw the construction of the modern town. The old village on the Baou, now felt to be too cramped, was abandoned as soon as the new quarters of Perthuis and au Delà were built. A town hall was erected and the port laid out. The parish church of Saint-Léger was built between 1660 and 1668, but the bell tower was not finished until 1740. The church now contains the Saint-Anne reredos which dates from the sixteenth century. In 1690, construction was initiated by Louis XIV on the royal black powder mill, La Poudrerie; this remained for a long time the town's principal industry until it shut down in 1974.

For several years during the French Revolution the town was renamed Port-Chamas. The two main quarters, one of which developed around the town hall, the other in proximity to the port, were linked by a tunnel called la Goule which collapsed in 1863. Today Saint-Chamas has become a residential and tourist town which has preserved its heritage and its appearance of a Provençal village.

== See also ==
- Communes of the Bouches-du-Rhône department
