= Olargues =

- Commune
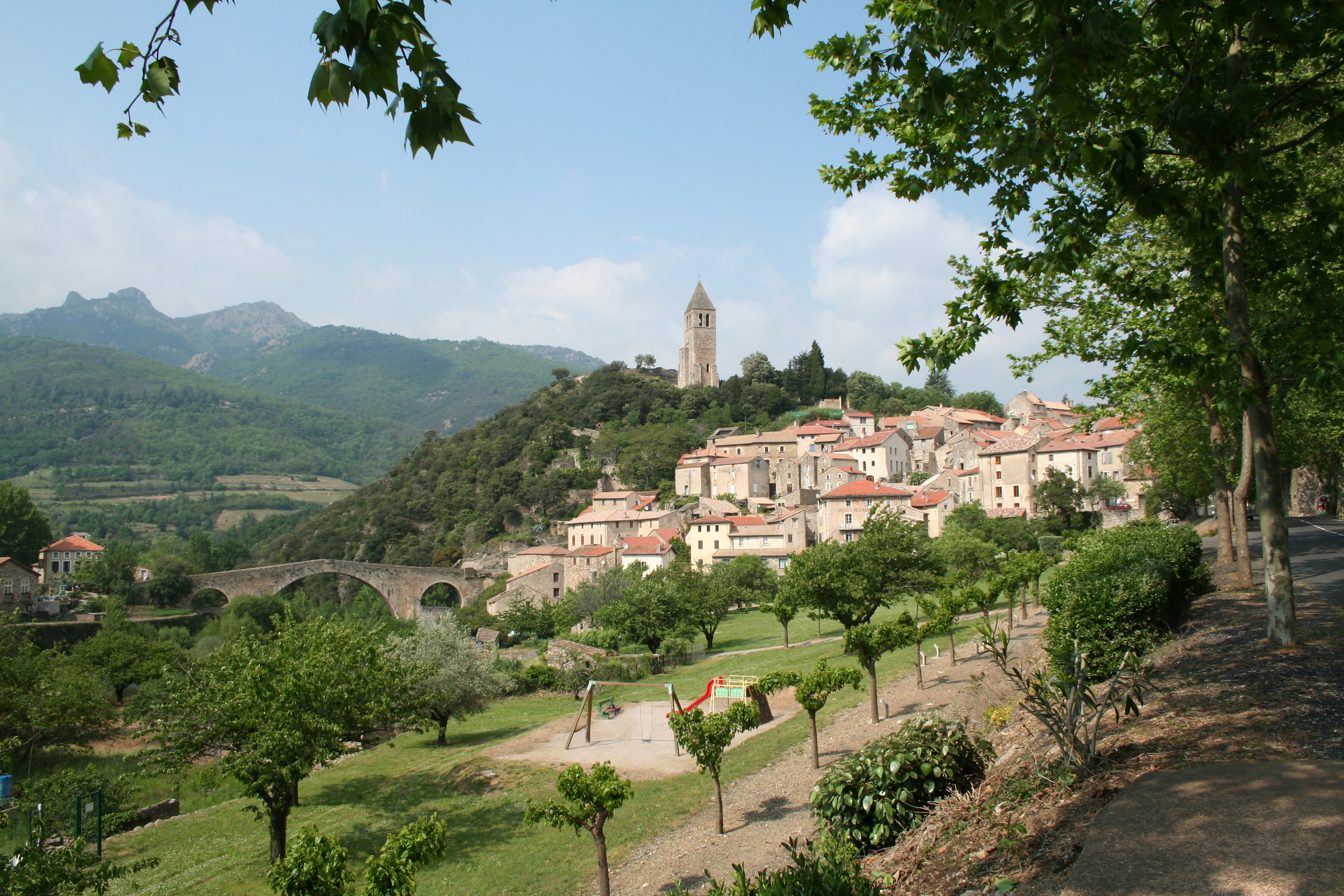
- A general view of Olargues

- Coat of arms
- Location of Olargues
- Location within France Location within Occitanie
- Coordinates: 43°33′26″N 2°54′55″E
- Country: France
- Region: Occitania
- Department: Hérault
- Arrondissement: Béziers
- Canton: Saint-Pons-de-Thomières

Government
  - Mayor (2020–2026): Jean Arcas
- Area^{1}: 18.6 km^{2} (7.2 sq mi)
- Elevation: 183 m (600 ft)
- Highest elevation: 760 m (2,490 ft)
- Lowest elevation: 148 m (486 ft)
- Population (2023): 488
  - Density: 26.2/km^{2} (68.0/sq mi)
- Time zone: UTC+01:00 (CET)
  - Summer (DST): UTC+02:00 (CEST)
- INSEE/Postal code: 34187 /34390
- ^{1} French Land Register data, which excludes lakes, ponds, glaciers > 1 km^{2} (0.386 sq mi or 247 acres) and river estuaries.

Olargues (French pronunciation: [ɔlaʁɡ]) is a commune in the Hérault department in the Occitanie region in southern France. It is a member of Les Plus Beaux Villages de France (The Most Beautiful Villages of France) Association.

Olargues is a good example of a French Medieval town. It was occupied by the Romans, the Vandals and the Visigoths. At the end of the 11th century the Jaur valley came under the authority of the Château of the Viscount of Minerve. The following centuries saw a succession of wars and epidemics, and it was not until the 18th century that Olargues became re-established. This was due to the prosperity of local agriculture and artisanal industry.

== Attractions ==
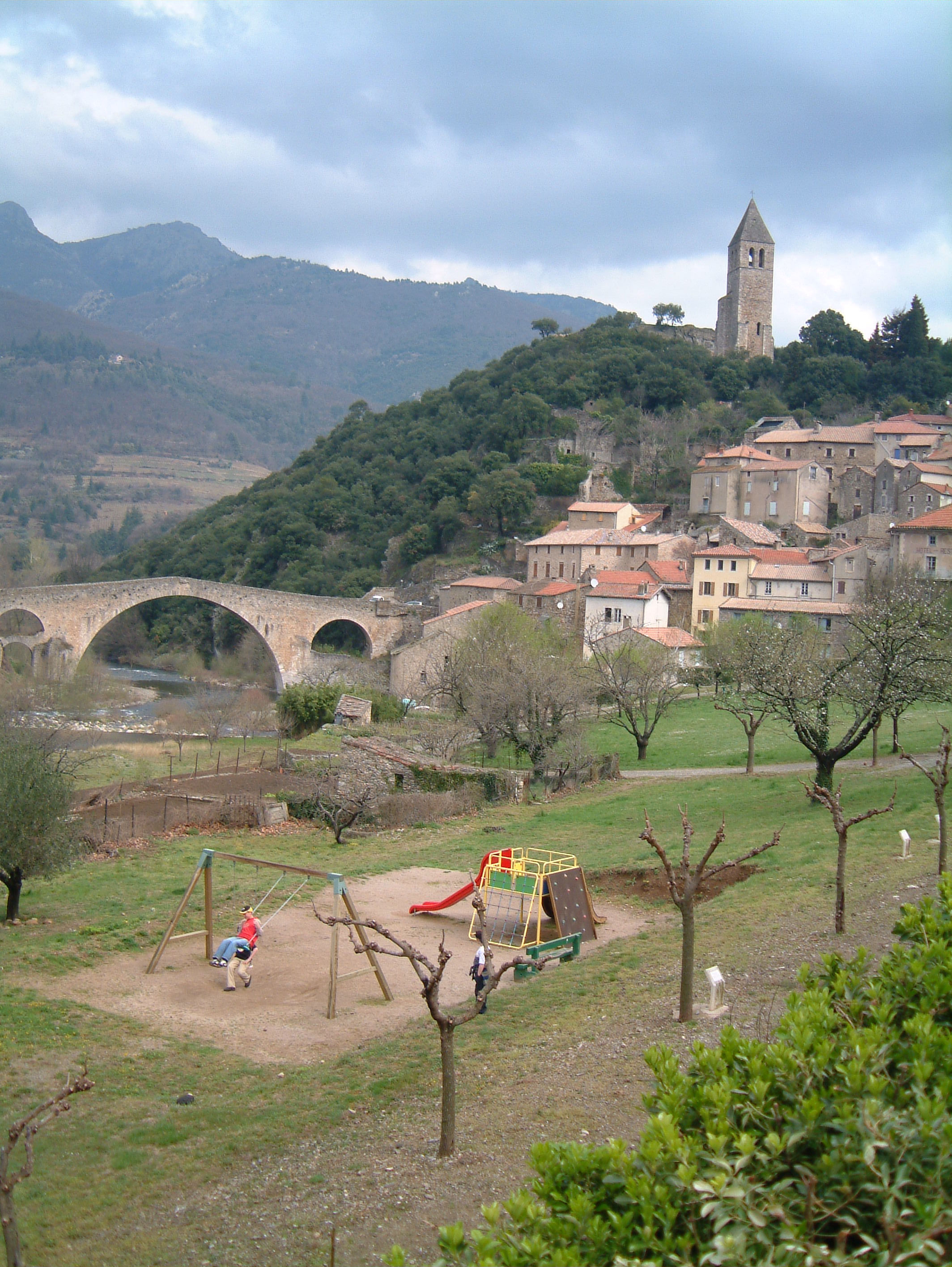
Devil's bridge and tower in Orlargues

=== Pont du Diable ===
The "Devil's Bridge" is said to date back to 1202 and is reputed to be the scene of transactions between the people of Olargues and the "devil". The old village is clustered around the belltower, which was formerly the main tower of the castle (Romanesque construction). The old shops have marble frontages and overhanging upper storeys. A museum of popular traditions and art is to be found in the stairs of the Commanderie.

== Population ==
Historical population
Year	Pop.	±% p.a.
1968	590	—
1975	518	−1.84%
1982	529	+0.30%
1990	512	−0.41%
1999	571	+1.22%
2007	598	+0.58%
2012	661	+2.02%
2017	679	+0.54%
2023	488	−5.36%
Source: INSEE

== See also ==
- Communes of the Hérault department
