= Nyons Bridge =

Medieval bridge in southern France

Coordinates: 44°21′36″N 5°8′39″E

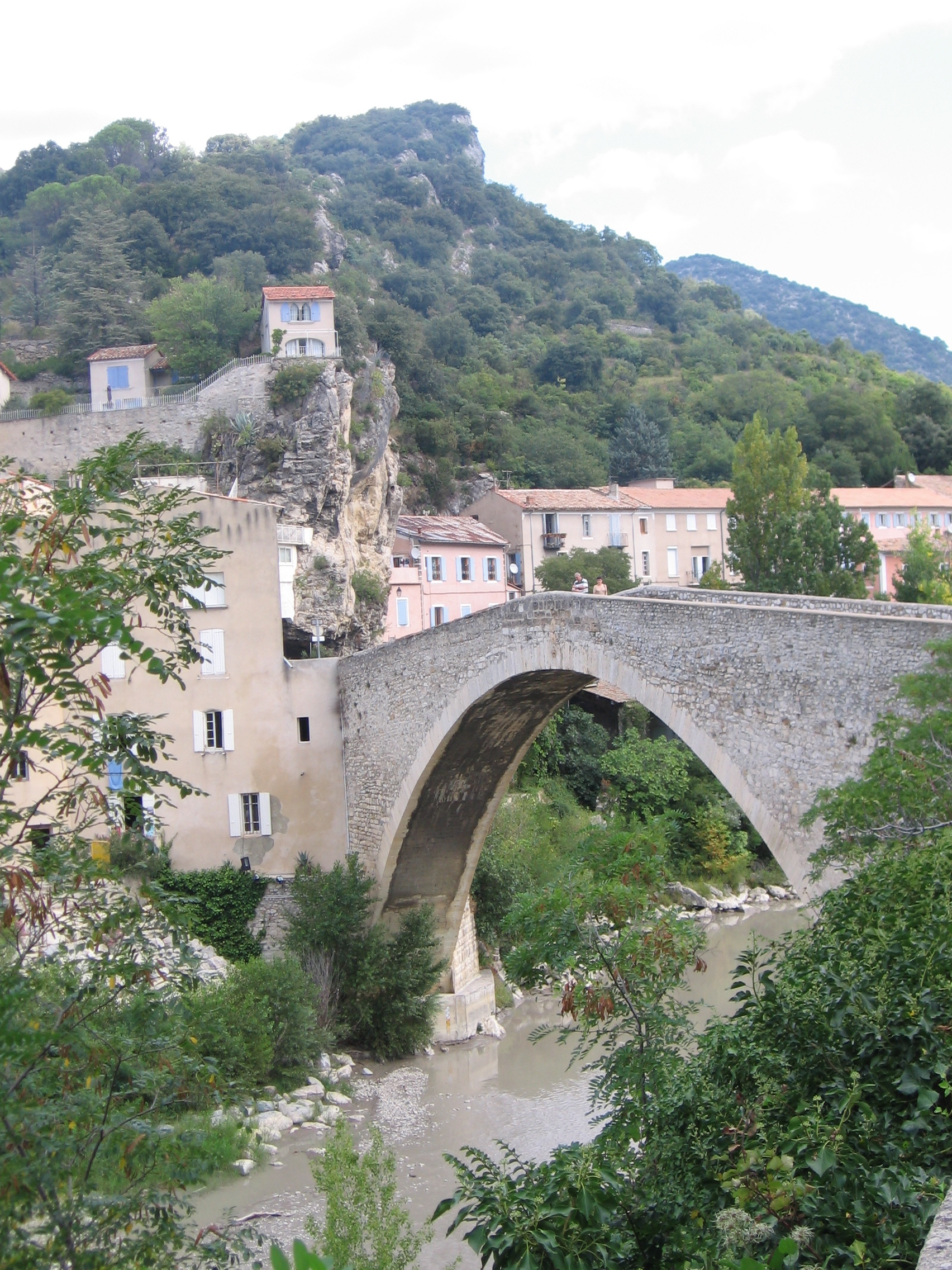
Pont de Nyons

The Nyons Bridge is a medieval bridge over the river Eygues in Nyons in southern France.

The bridge was completed in 1407. It features a single span of 40.53 m, quite large for the standards of the day.

== See also ==
- List of bridges in France
- List of medieval bridges in France

Other very large medieval bridges

- Puente del Diablo (Martorell) (37.3 m span)
- Ponte della Maddalena (37.8 m span)
- Puente de San Martín (Toledo) (40 m span)
- Pont du Diable (Céret) (45.45 m span)
- Castelvecchio Bridge (48.7 m span)
- Pont Grand (Tournon-sur-Rhône) (49.2 m span)
- Pont de Vieille-Brioude (54.2 m span)
- Trezzo sull'Adda Bridge (72 m span)
