= Puente de San Martín (Toledo) =

Medieval bridge in Toledo, Spain

Coordinates: 39°51′23.76″N 4°02′03.21″W

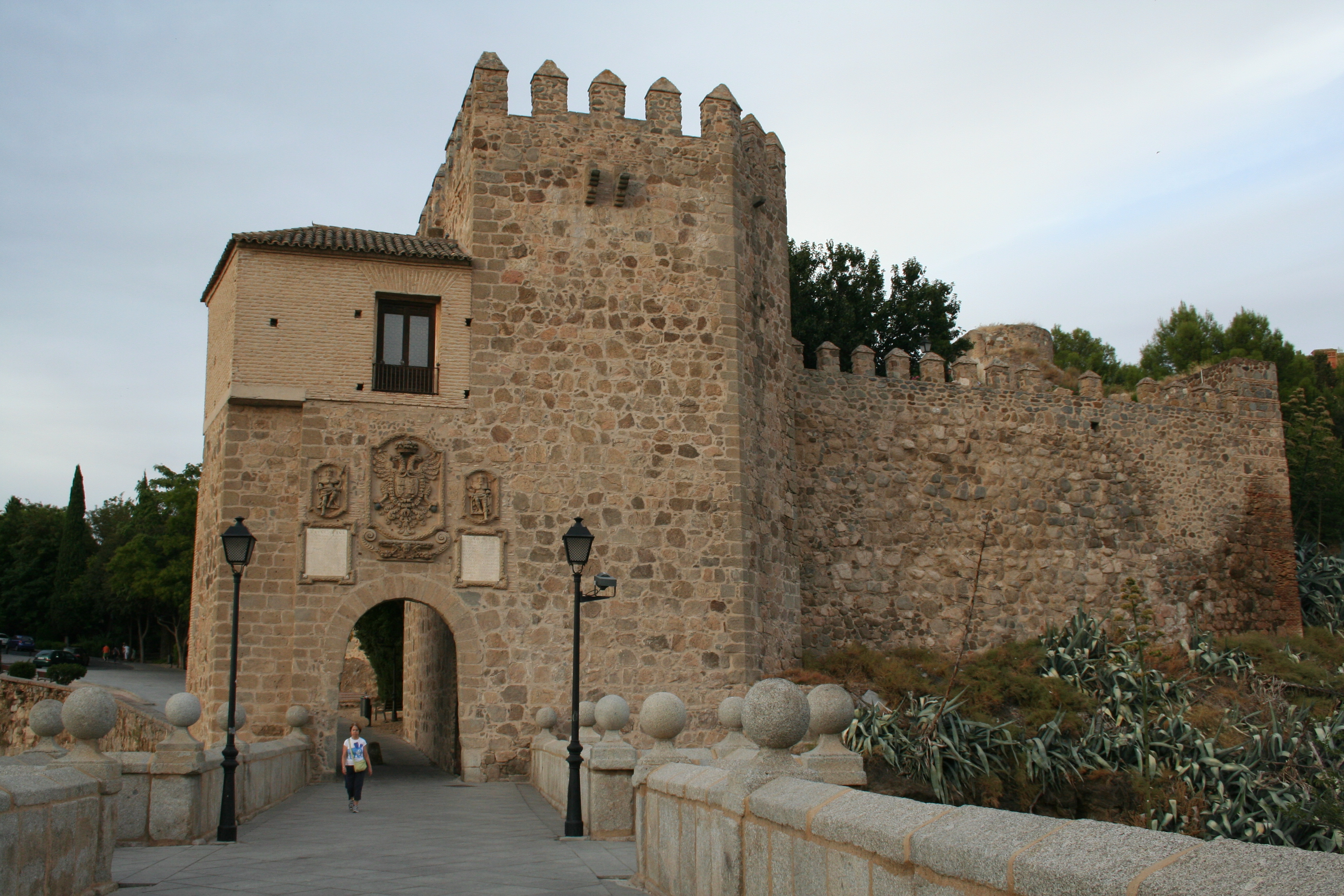
An extreme of the Puente de San Martín in Toledo

The Puente de San Martín (English: St Martin's Bridge) is a medieval bridge across the river Tagus in Toledo, Spain.

The Puente de San Martín features five arches, with the largest in the middle having a span of 40 meters. Only very few bridges in the world were that long at the time of its construction.

== History ==
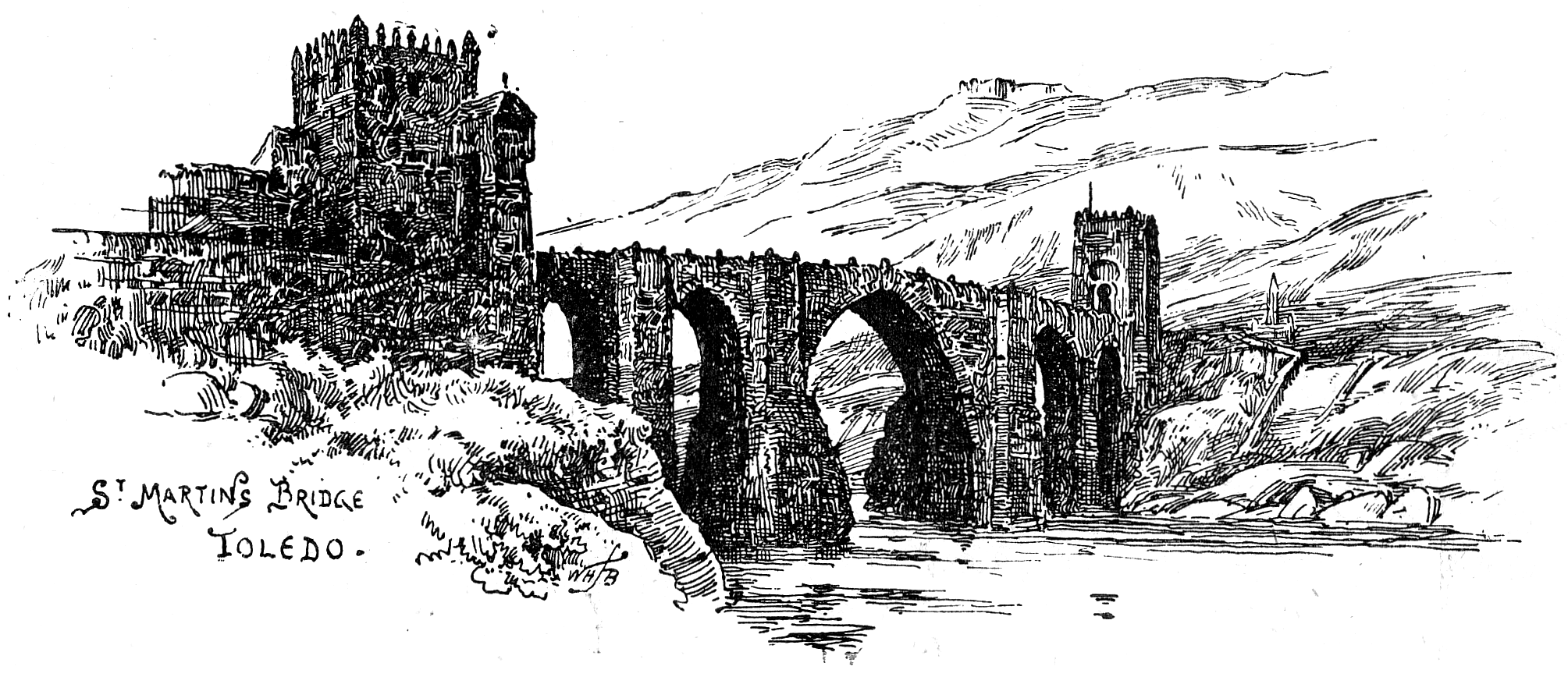
A Victorian depiction of St. Martins Bridge.

The bridge was constructed in the late 14th century by archbishop Pedro Tenorio to provide access to the old town from the west, complementing the older Puente de Alcántara linking to the east. Both sides of the bridge were heavily fortified with towers, the more recent dating from the 16th century.

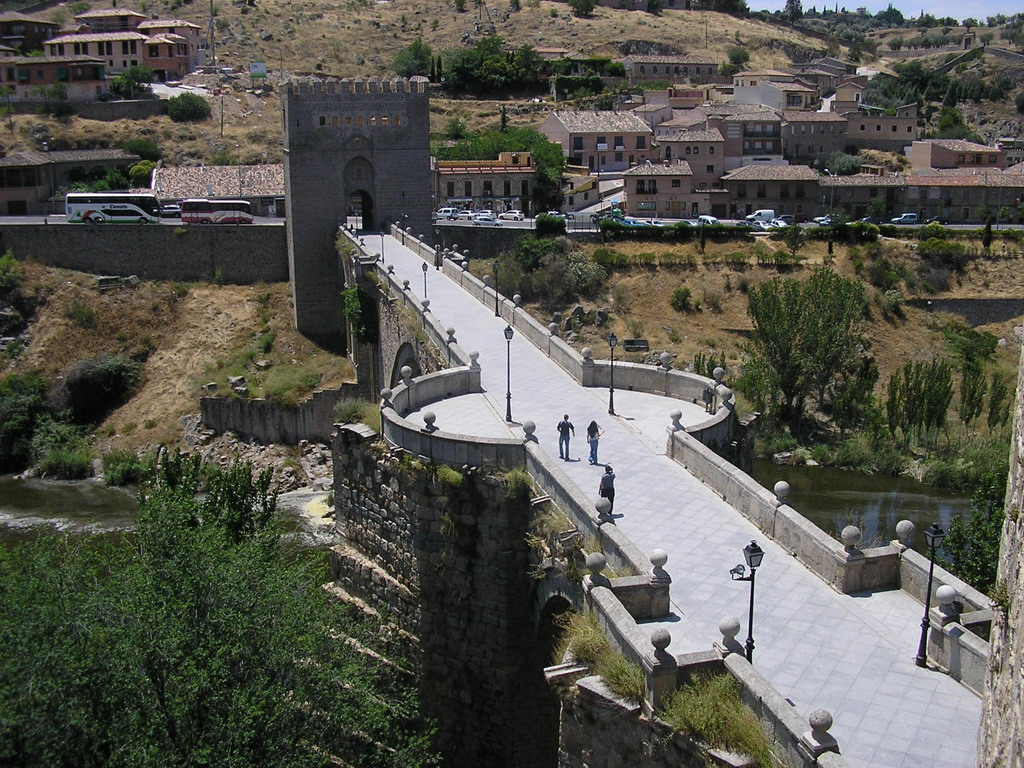
Puente de San Martín in Toledo

== Legend ==
A legend about the bridge is that Ildefonsus, the Metropolitan Bishop of Toledo, asked to be present at the inauguration of the bridge. When the architect was viewing the bridge the day before the bridge's inauguration, he was horrified to notice that he had made a perilous miscalculation - the bridge would collapse once its supports were removed. He went home and told his wife that the bridge would collapse, with him on it, and that he would be disgraced. That night, while he slept, his wife secretly made her way to the bridge and started a fire to ensure it would burn down. Her husband was saved from disgrace and the bridge was rebuilt without the original structural miscalculations.

== See also ==
Other very large medieval bridges

- Puente del Diablo (Martorell) (37.3 m span)
- Ponte della Maddalena (37.8 m span)
- Nyons Bridge (40.53 m span)
- Pont du Diable (Céret) (45.45 m span)
- Castelvecchio Bridge (48.7 m span)
- Pont Grand (Tournon-sur-Rhône) (49.2 m span)
- Pont de Vieille-Brioude (54.2 m span)
- Trezzo sull'Adda Bridge (72 m span)

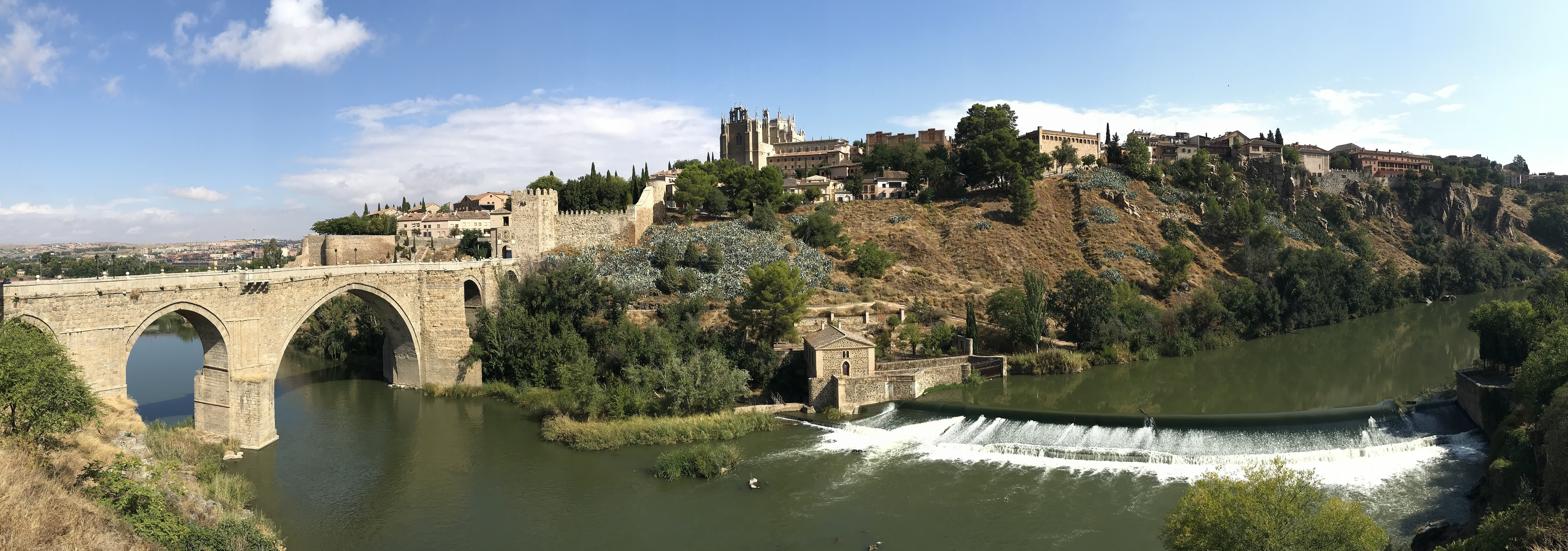
Puente de San Martín
