= Devil's Bridge =

List of bridges, found primarily in Europe

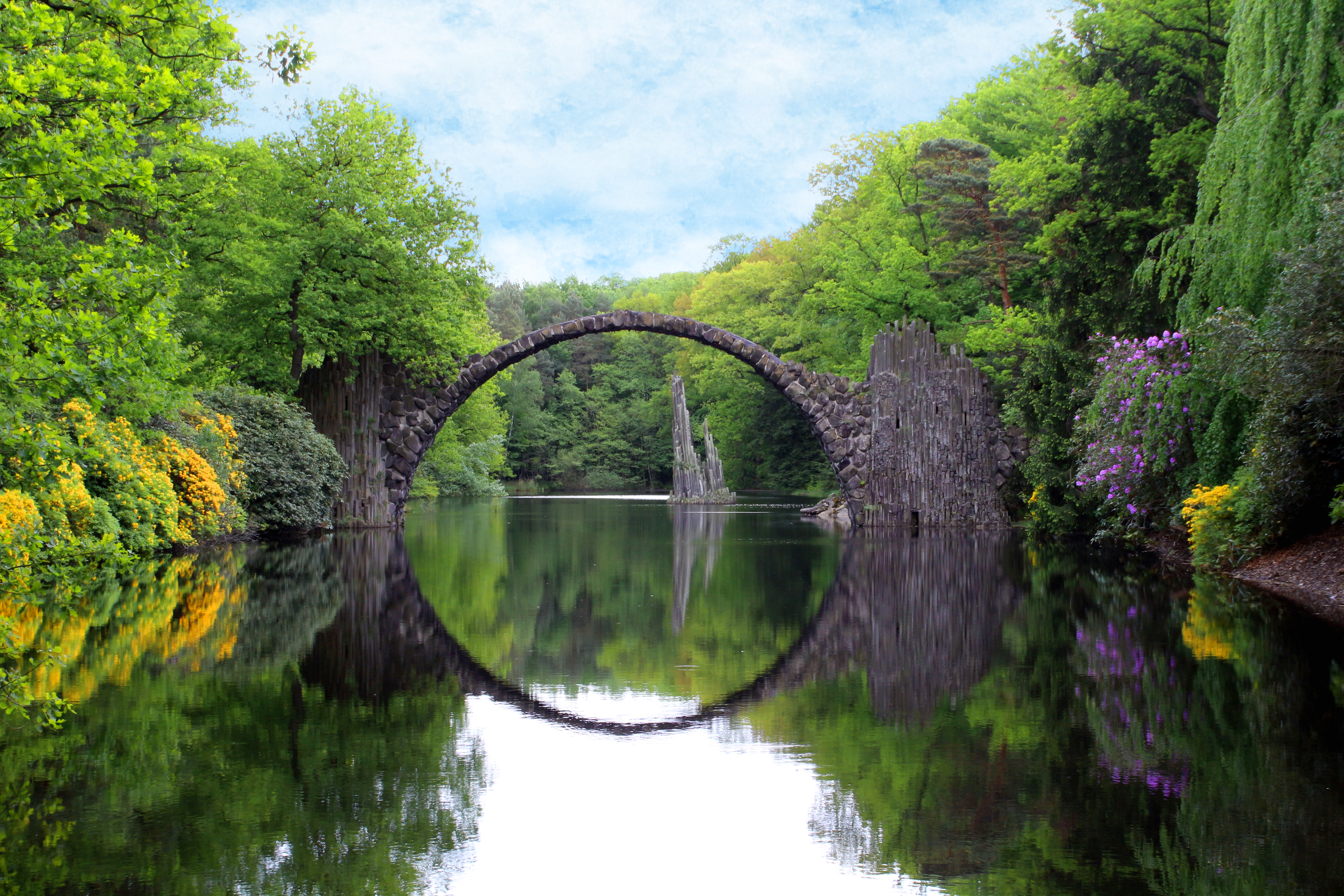
Devil's Bridge (Teufelsbrücke) in Gablenz, Saxony, Germany

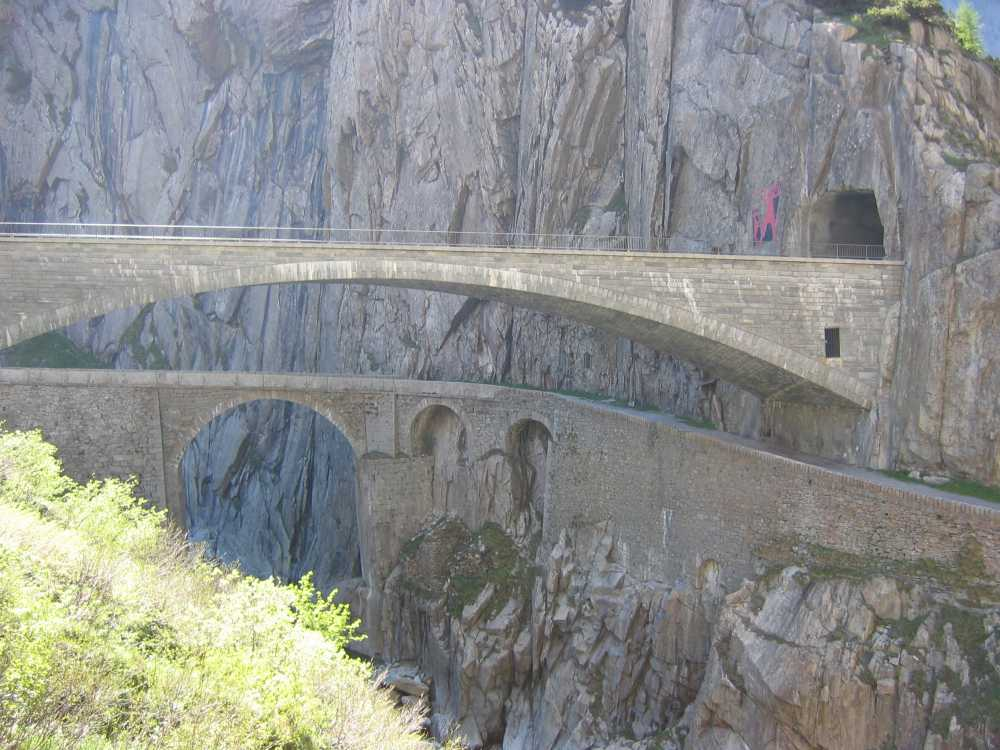
Teufelsbrücke of St Gotthard Pass, Switzerland

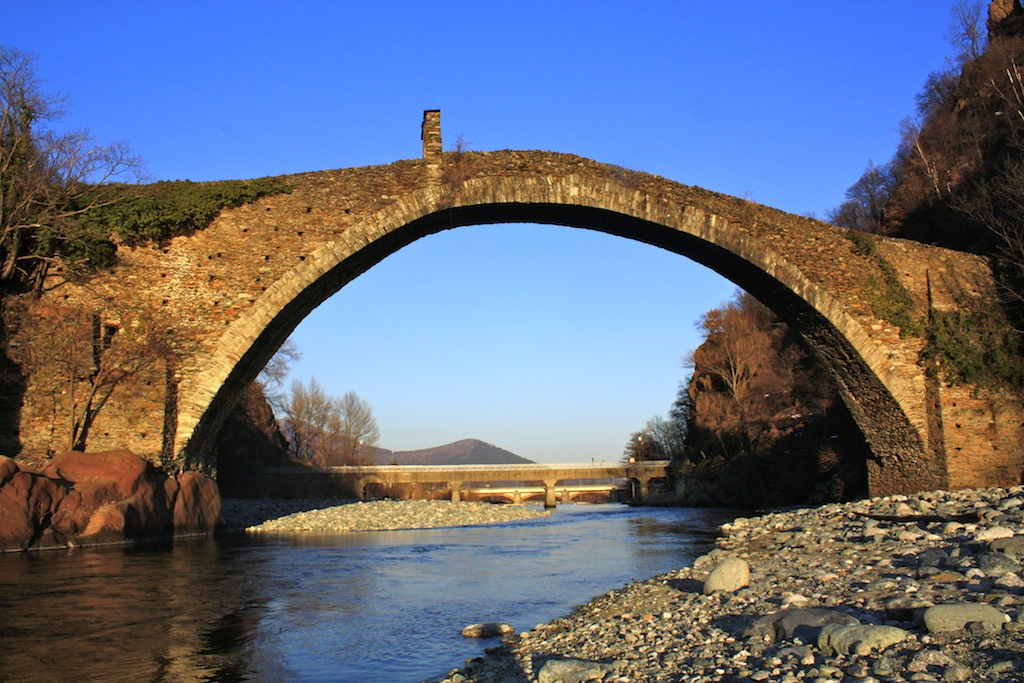
Devil's Bridge (Italian: Ponte del Diavolo) in Lanzo Torinese, northern Italy

Devil's Bridge is a term applied to dozens of ancient bridges, found primarily in Europe. Most of these bridges are stone or masonry arch bridges and represent a significant technological achievement in ancient architecture. Due to their unusual design, they were an object of fascination and stories in antiquity and medieval Europe.

Each of the Devil's bridges typically has a corresponding Devil-related myth or folktale regarding its origin. These stories vary widely depending on the region and beliefs. Some have the Devil as the builder of the bridge, relating to the precariousness or impossibility of such a bridge to last or exist in the first place, so much so that only the Devil himself could have built it. Others have the knowledge to build such bridges given to mankind as a gift from the Devil as part of a deal, pact or bargain between the Devil and local populace, usually in exchange for their souls.

== Associated legends ==
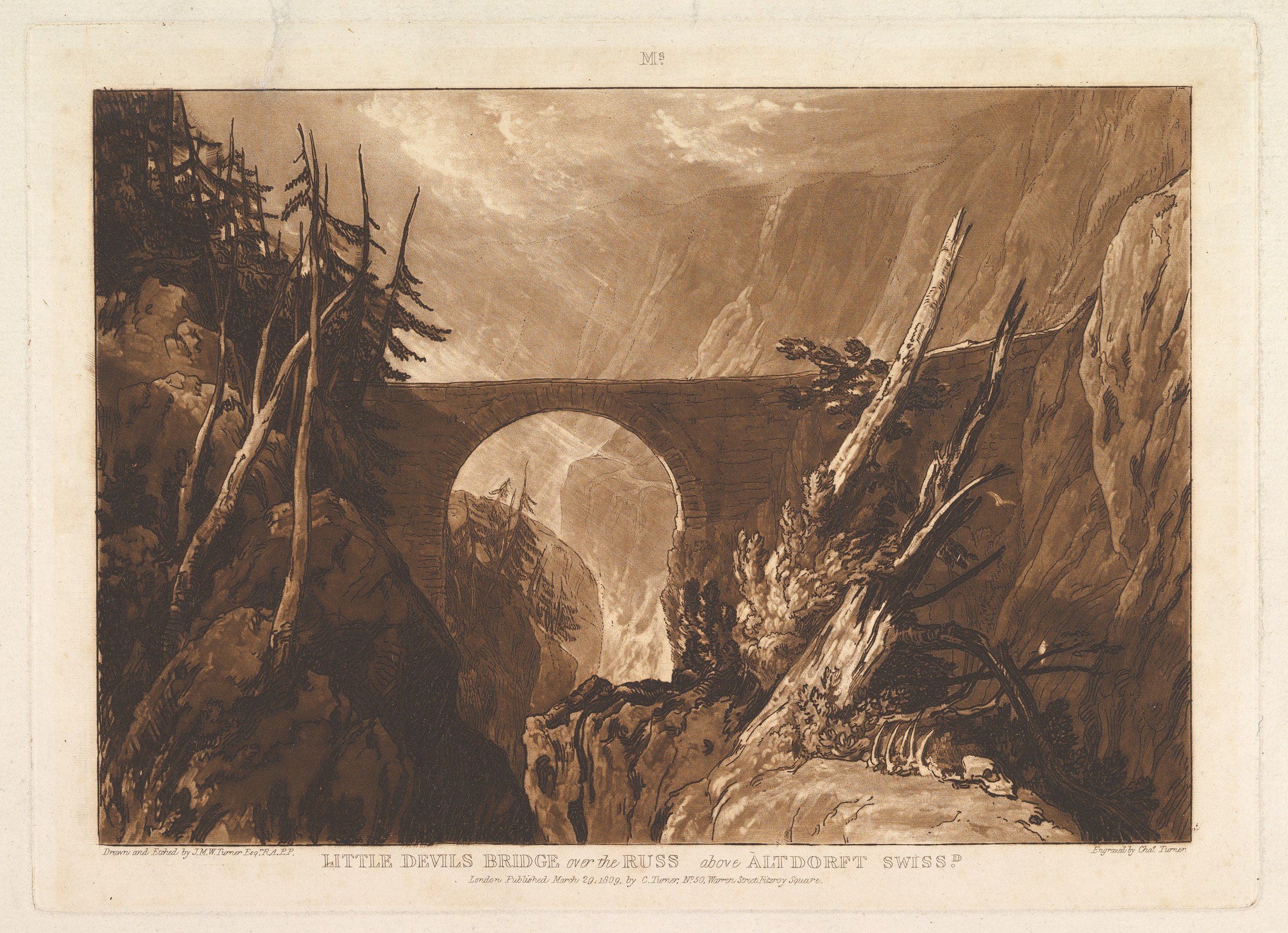
Little Devil's Bridge (1809) by J. M. W. Turner

The bridges that fall into the Devil's Bridge category are so numerous that the legends about them form a special category in the Aarne-Thompson (AT) classification system for folktales (Number 1191). Some legends have elements of related folktale-categories, for example Deceiving the Devil (AT #1196), The Devil's Contract (AT #756B), and The Master Builder legends.

One version of the tale presents the bridge builder and the Devil as adversaries. This reflects the fact that frequently, such as in the case of the Teufelsbrücke at the St Gotthard Pass, these bridges were built under such challenging conditions that successful completion of the bridge required a heroic effort on the part of the builders and the community, ensuring its legendary status.

Other versions of the legend feature an old lady or a simple herder who makes a pact with the Devil. In this version the devil agrees to build the bridge, in return receiving the first soul to cross it. After building the bridge (often overnight) the devil is outwitted by his adversary (for example, by throwing bread to lure a dog over the bridge first) and is last seen descending into the water, bringing peace to the community.

In the case of the Steinerne Brücke in Regensburg, the legend speaks of the devil helping in a race between the builders of the bridge and of the cathedral (in fact a significantly later construction), and a slight bump in the middle of the bridge is said to result from the devil's leaping with rage upon being tricked out of his prize.

In the legend of Teufelsbrück in Hamburg, which leads only over a small stream, the carpenter, in a pact with the devil, promised him the first soul to cross the bridge. On the day of inauguration, while the priest and county councillor debated who should step on the bridge first, a rabbit crossed it and the disappointed devil disappeared. A statue refers to the legend there.

The legend of Ponte della Maddalena in Borgo a Mozzano, Province of Lucca, tells of a local saint (often Saint Julian, the Hospitaller) who makes the pact with the devil. On the day of delivery, the saint sets fire to a dog or a pig, which crosses the bridge and deceives the devil.

At Sens, a thirteenth-century legend tells of an architect who sold his soul to the devil and then subsequently repented. M. le Curé of Sens drove the devil away with holy water and with an exorcism formula beginning with the words Vade retro satana, which he made the penitent repeat. The formula was, at some time, incorporated into the design of the popular Saint Benedict Medal.

Most of the bridges that have received the "Devil's Bridge" appellation are remarkable in some regard, most often for the technological hurdles surpassed in building the bridge, but on occasion for their aesthetic grace as well, or for its economic or strategic importance to the community it serves.

== List of bridges ==
=== Antigua and Barbuda ===
- Devil's Bridge – Antigua

=== Argentina ===
- Puente La Noria – Buenos Aires

=== Bulgaria ===
- Dyavolski most (Дяволски мост) – near Ardino

=== Colombia ===
- Puente del Común - Chía

=== Estonia ===
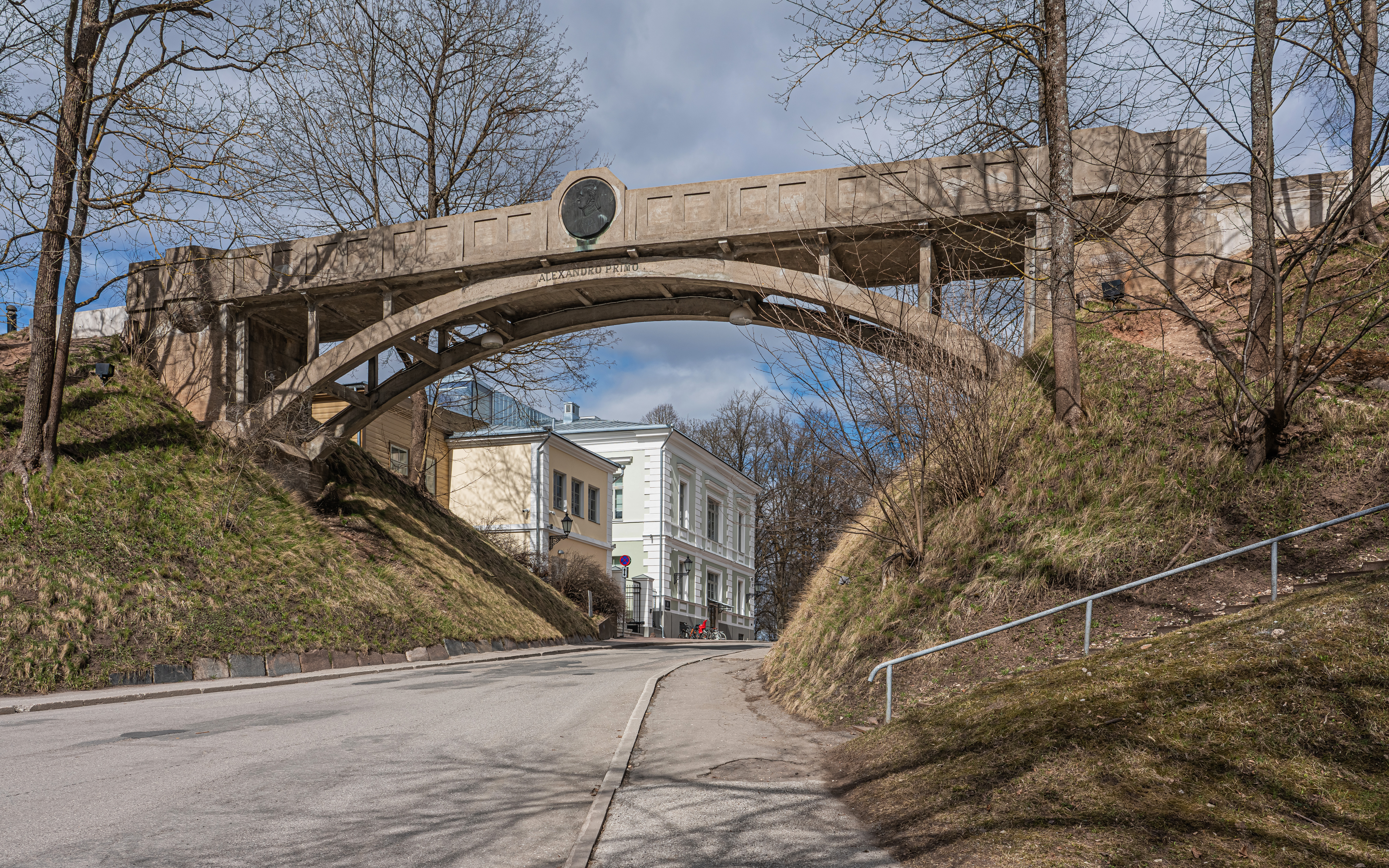
Kuradisild in Tartu Estonia

- Kuradisild – Tartu

=== France ===
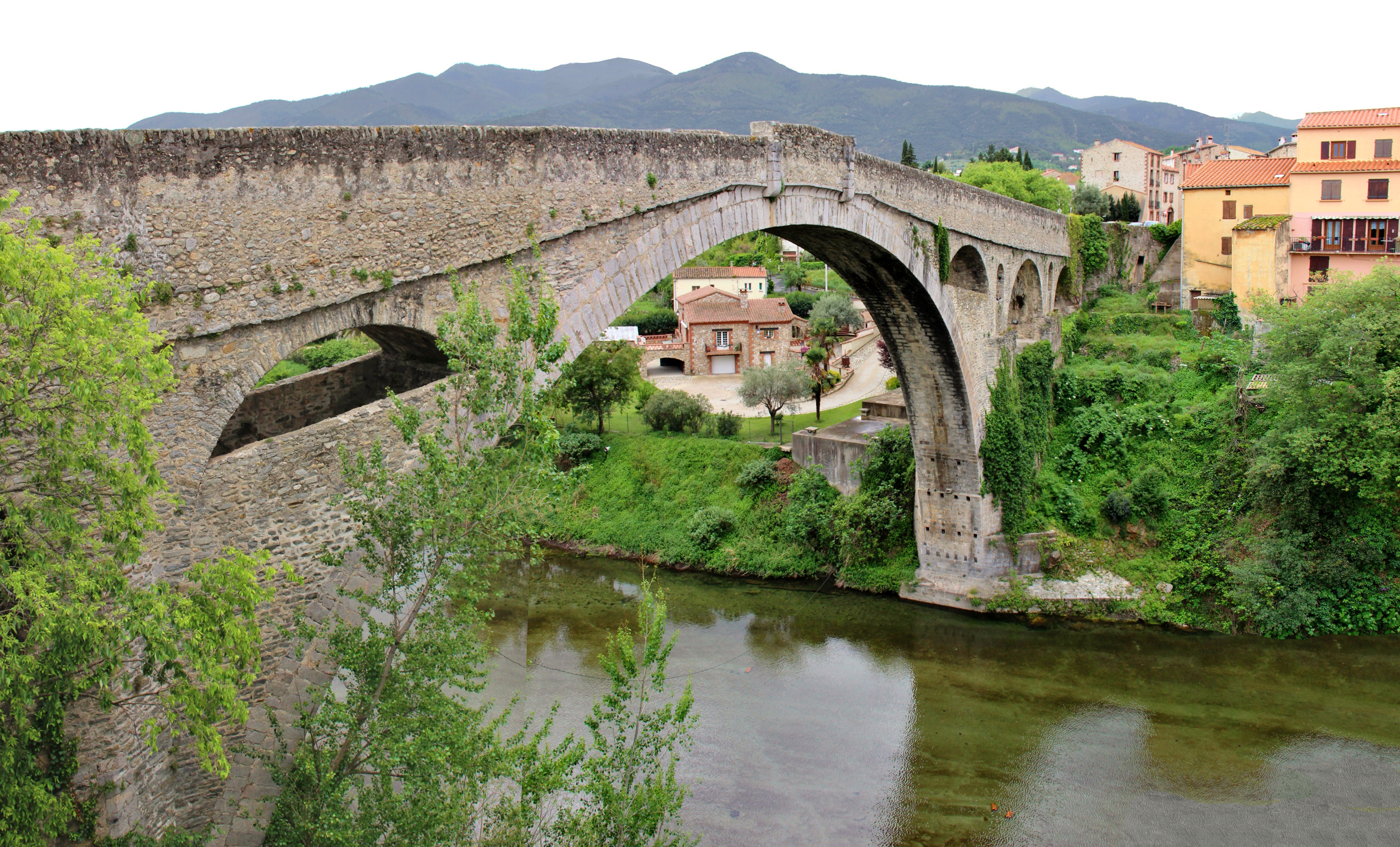
Pont du Diable in Céret, southern France

There are 49 Devil's Bridges in France, including:

- Pont du Diable – Aniane, Gorges de l'Hérault, Languedoc-Roussillon
- Pont du Diable – Villemagne-l'Argentière, Hérault, Languedoc-Roussillon
- Pont du Diable – Beaugency
- Pont du Diable – Céret
- Pont du Diable (Ariège) – near Foix
- Pont du Diable – Olargues
- Pont Valentré (Pont du Diable) – Cahors
- Pont du Diable – Crouzet Migette
- Pont du Diable – Sens
- Pont du Diable − La Forclaz

=== Germany ===
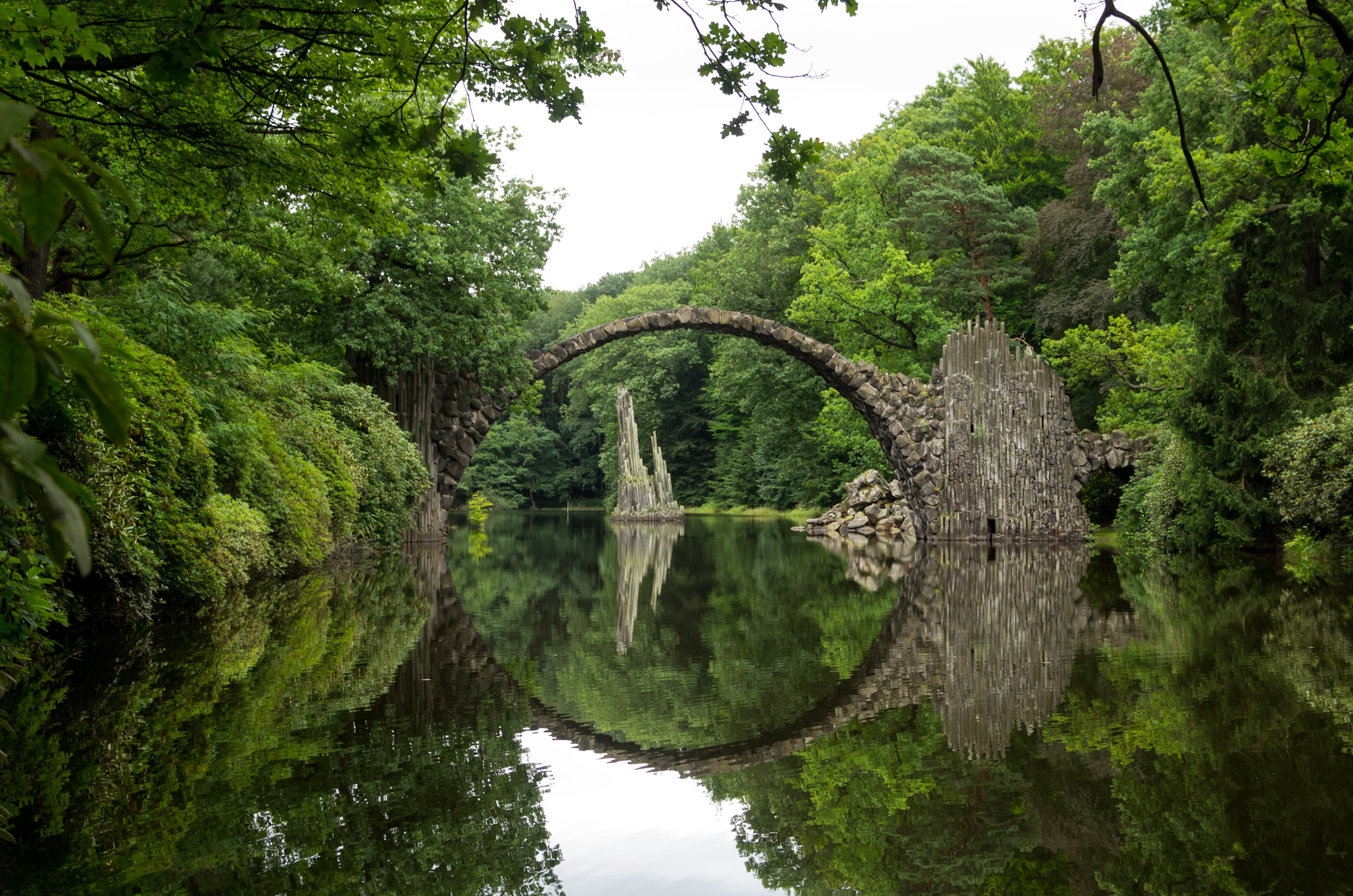
Rakotzbrücke, Azalea and Rhododendron Park Kromlau – Saxony

- Rakotzbrücke, Azalea and Rhododendron Park Kromlau – Saxony
- Brickegickel – Frankfurt
- Teufelsbrück – Hamburg
- Steinerne Brücke – Regensburg
- Teufelsbrücke – Mannheim
- Teufelsbrücke—Inzigkofen

=== Italy ===
- Ponte del Diavolo – ruins of a Roman bridge along Via Traiana near Montecalvo Irpino, Campania
- Ponte del Diavolo – Ascoli Piceno, Marche
- Ponte del Diavolo – Blera, Lazio
- Ponte del Diavolo (officially Ponte Vecchio, also Ponte Gobbo) – Bobbio, Emilia Romagna
- Ponte del Diavolo or Ponte della Maddalena – Borgo a Mozzano, Tuscany
- Ponte del Diavolo – Cavallara (a frazione of Gualdo Cattaneo, Umbria)
- Ponte di Annibale – Cerreto Sannita, Campania
- Ponte del Diavolo – Cividale, Friuli
- Ponte del Diavolo – Civita, Calabria
- Ponte del Diavolo (Su ponti de su tiaulu or Su ponti de is aremigus) – Decimomannu, Sardinia
- Ponte del Diavolo (Ponte Vecchio) – Dronero, Province of Cuneo, Piedmont
- Ponte Fabio Massimo – Faicchio, Campania
- Ponte del Diavolo – Lanzo Torinese, Piedmont
- Ponte del Diavolo – Torcello, Veneto

=== Mexico ===
- Puente del Tunkuwini – Jonotla, Puebla, México.
- Puente de Tololotlán – Puente Grande, Tonalá, Jalisco, México.
- Puente de Batanes – Salvatierra, Guanajuato, México.
- Puente del diablo – Navacoyán, Durango, México.
- Puente del diablo – Sierra Norte, Oaxaca, México.
- Puente del diablo – Ixtla, Morelos, México.
- Puente del diablo – Coatepec, Veracruz, México.

=== Netherlands ===
- Duivelsbrug – Breda

=== North Macedonia ===
- Elen Skok – Reka

=== Philippines ===
- Puente del Diablo (or Punta del Diablo) – Binangonan, Philippines

=== Portugal ===
- Ponte da Mizarela – Braga District

=== Romania ===
- Moara Dracului ("The Devil's mill") – Câmpulung Moldovenesc

=== Russia ===
- Chertov Most – bypass route around the Severomuysky Tunnel, Buryatia

=== Slovenia ===
- Hudičev most – Bohinj
- Hudičev most – Tolmin

=== Spain ===
- Puente del Diablo – Cueto, Spain
- Puente del Diablo – Martorell
- Aqüeducte de les Ferreres – Tarragona

=== Switzerland ===
- Pont du Saut de Brot — Gorges de l'Areuse
- Teufelsbrücke – St Gotthard Pass
- Teufelsbrücke (Egg) – Hamlet of Egg, municipality of Einsiedeln, canton of Schwyz
- See W. Turner's etching: Little Devil's Bridge over the Russ, above Altdorft, Swiss.d. The old bridge has collapsed.

=== United Kingdom ===
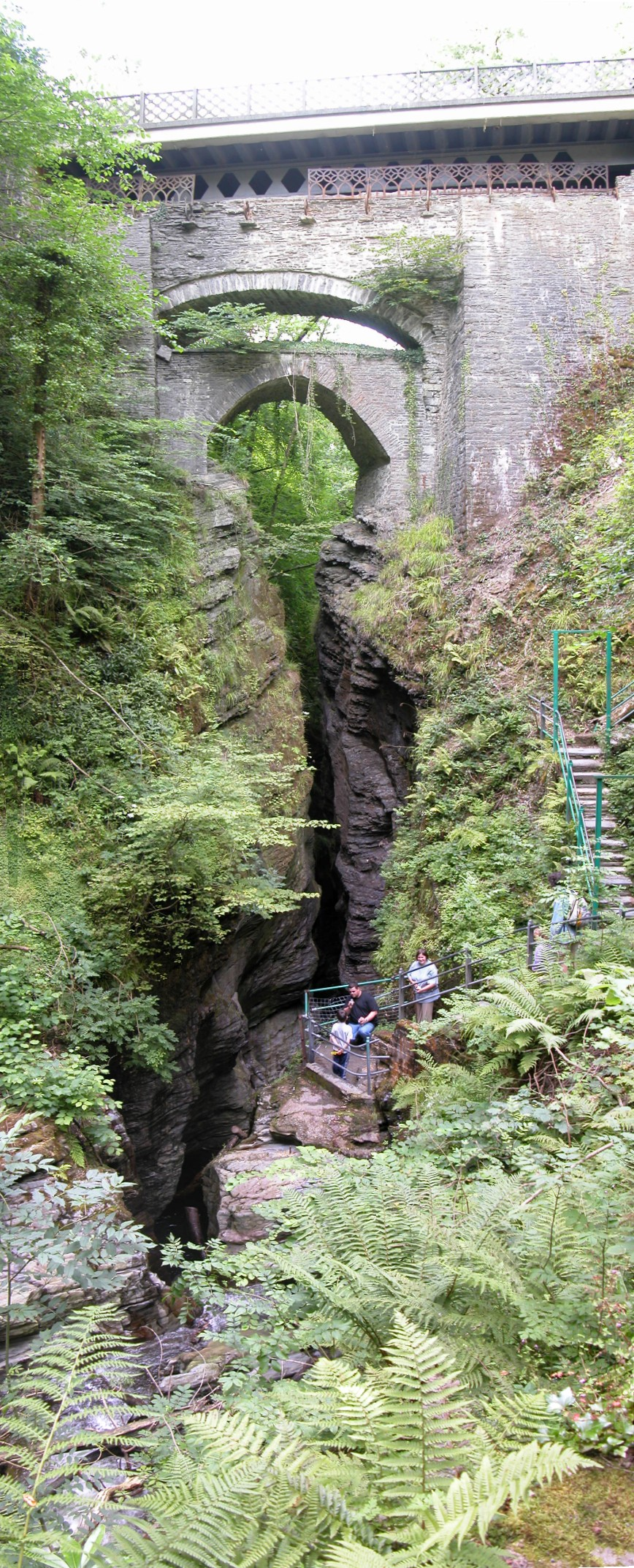
The three bridges of Devil's Bridge, Ceredigion, Wales

Devil's Bridge, Nettleden, near Berkhamsted, Hertfordshire, England.

- Devil's Bridge – Devil's Bridge village, Ceredigion, Wales
- Devil's Bridge – Kirkby Lonsdale, Cumbria
- Devil's Bridge – Horace Farm, Pennington Parish, Cumbria
- Devil's Bridge – Weston-super-Mare, North Somerset (1841 bridge over railway)
- Devil's Bridge – in the grounds of Weston Park, Staffordshire (18th-century listed bridge in form of grotto)
- Devil's Bridge – Pontwalby, Glynneath, Wales
- Devil's Bridge – Mossley Hill, Liverpool
- Devil's Bridge – Worm's Head, Rhossili, Gower, Wales (a natural arch)
- Devil's Bridge – Nettleden, near Berkhamsted, Hertfordshire.

=== United States ===
- Devil's Bridge – Sedona, Arizona, although this is a naturally formed bridge, not a man-made stone bridge

== See also ==
- Bridge of Arta
- Moon bridge – a highly rounded arched pedestrian bridge associated with gardens in China and Japan.
