= Pont Grand (Tournon-sur-Rhône) =

Arched stone bridge in Ardèche, Franve

Coordinates: 45.067°N 4.781°E

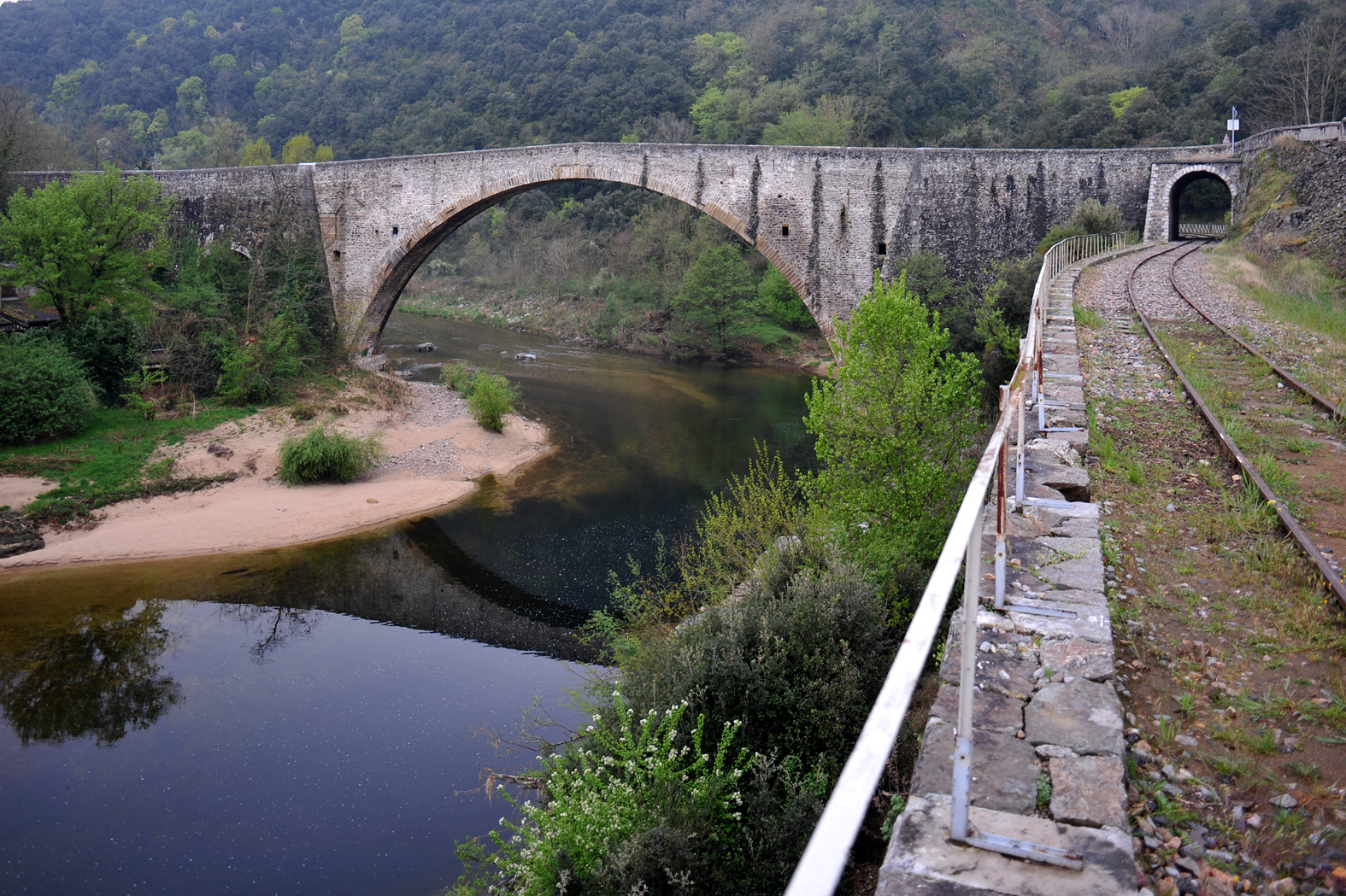
Pont Grand.

The Pont Grand is a stone bridge connecting Tournon-sur-Rhône to Saint-Jean-de-Muzols, in Ardèche, France, built between 1379 and 1583. The bridge features a single, semi-circular arch over the river Doux with a span of 49.20 m. The height of the piers is 17.73 m.

== See also ==
- List of bridges in France
- List of medieval bridges in France

Other very large medieval bridges

- Puente del Diablo (Martorell) (37.3 m span)
- Ponte della Maddalena (37.8 m span)
- Puente de San Martín (Toledo) (40 m span)
- Nyons Bridge (40.53 m span)
- Pont du Diable (Céret) (45.45 m span)
- Castelvecchio Bridge (48.7 m span)
- Pont de Vieille-Brioude (54.2 m span)
- Trezzo sull'Adda Bridge (72 m span)
