= Pont du Diable (Céret) =

14th century bridge in southern France

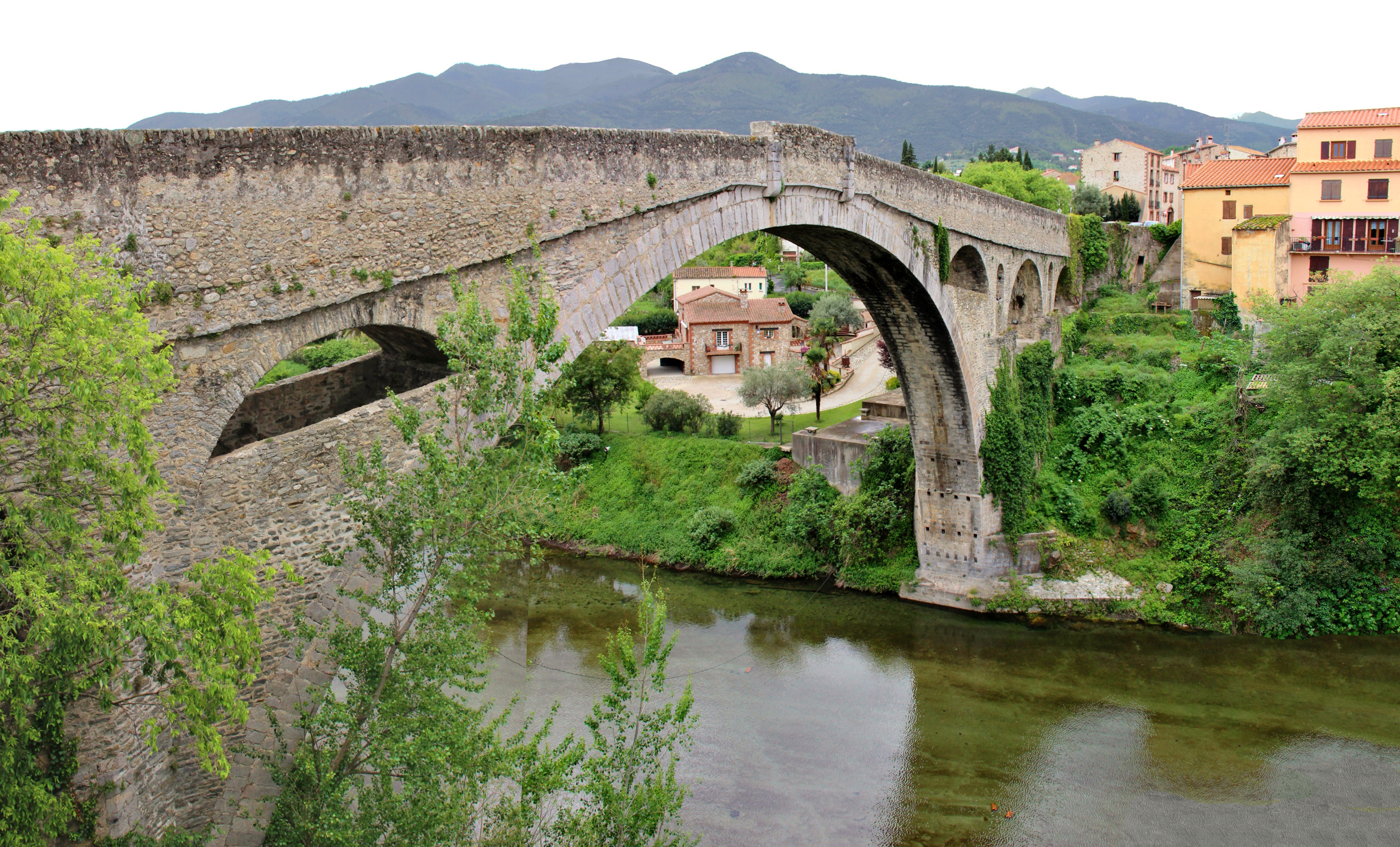
- Le Pont du Diable de Céret (The Devil's bridge of Céret)
- Coordinates: 42°29′43″N 2°44′39″E
- Crosses: Tech River
- Locale: Céret, Pyrénées-Orientales, France

Characteristics
- Design: stone arch bridge
- Longest span: 45.45 metres (149.1 ft)
- Clearance below: 22.3 metres (73 ft)

History
- Construction start: 1321
- Construction end: 1341

Location
- Interactive map of Pont du Diable

The Pont du Diable (English: Devil's Bridge) or Pont Vieux (English: Old bridge) is a medieval stone arch bridge at Céret, France, built between 1321 and 1341. It spans the Tech River with a single arch of 45.45 metres (149.1 ft). At its apex, the arch is 22.3 metres (73 ft) high.

== History ==
At the time of its construction it became the world's largest bridge arch, being bigger than the Ponte della Maddalena in Italy which held the world record until then. It remained so until 1356, when the Castelvecchio Bridge in Verona (Italy) became the new largest bridge. Damaged during the war of the First Coalition (1792–1797), French general Luc Siméon Auguste Dagobert wanted to blow it up to keep the Spanish army from going back to Catalonia. The bridge was saved just before being destroyed thanks to the action of Representative Joseph Cassanyes and restored later.

== Legend ==
The locals wanted a bridge to be built across the river and called upon the devil to build it for them. The devil agreed on the condition that he would claim the first soul to cross the bridge. Once the bridge was built the locals sent a cat across for the devil to claim its soul. Then for many years afterwards no person would cross, just in case – a legend common to many devil's bridges in France.

== In arts ==
- The bridge was painted by Paul Cézanne and Auguste Herbin.
- It features in a scene from the film The Hunchback by André Hunebelle, in which three swordsmen are sent to Spain to kill Lagardère and the daughter of the Duke of Nevers.

== Gallery ==
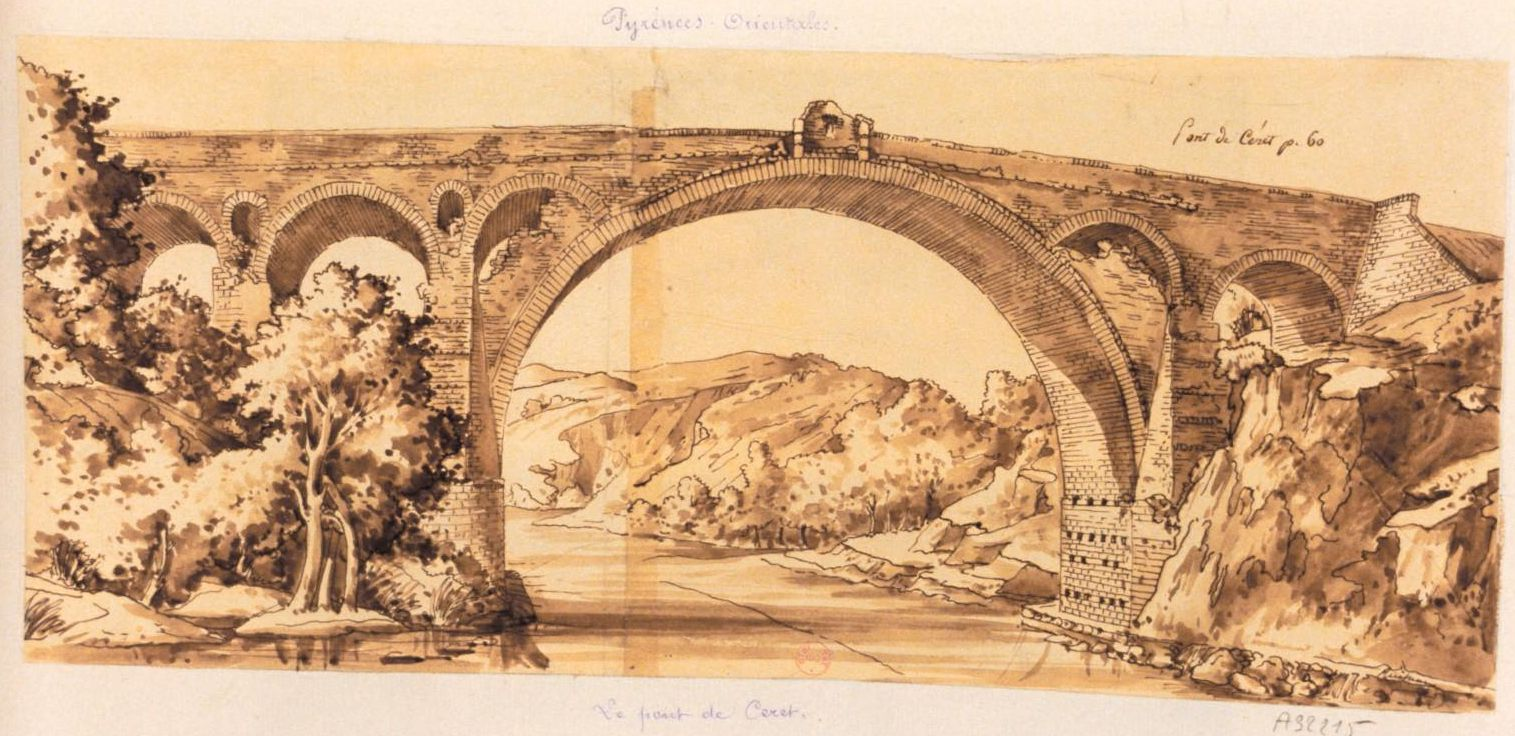
1830

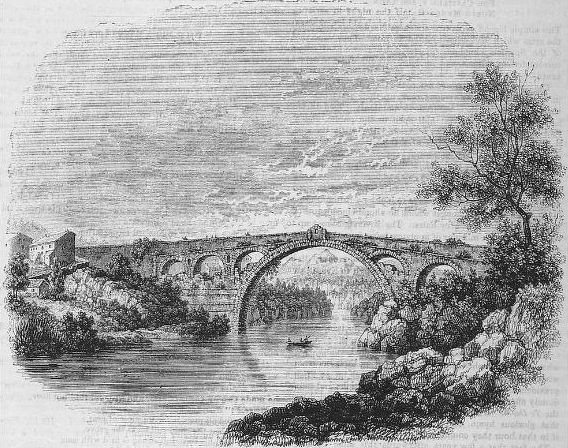
1853

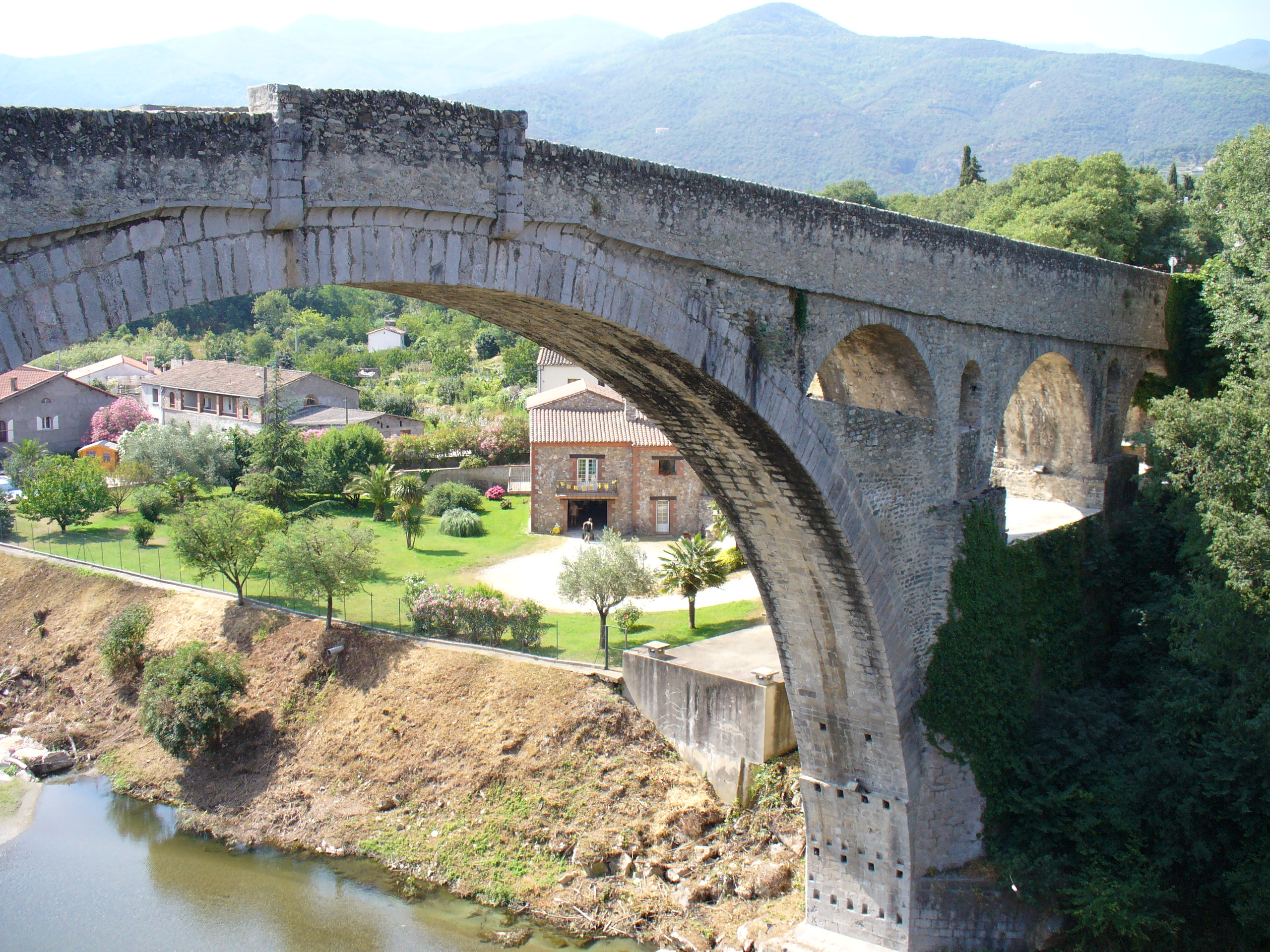

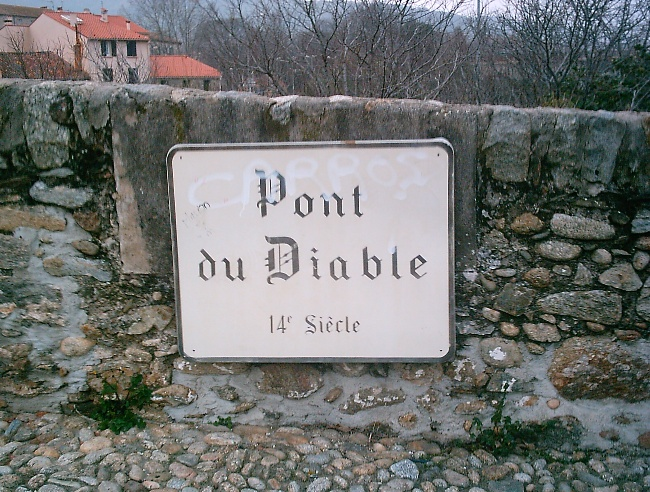

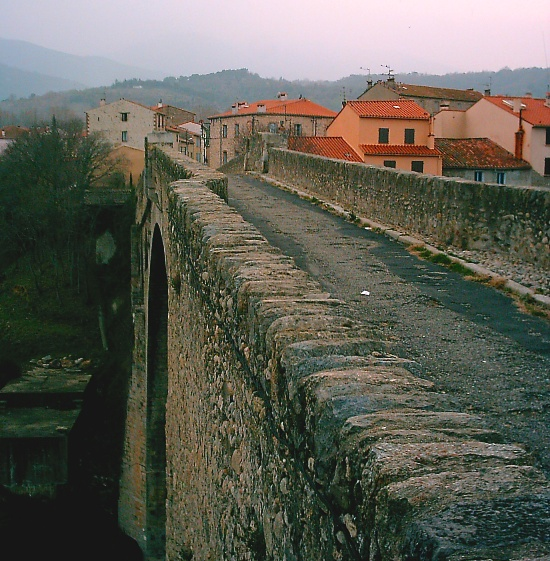

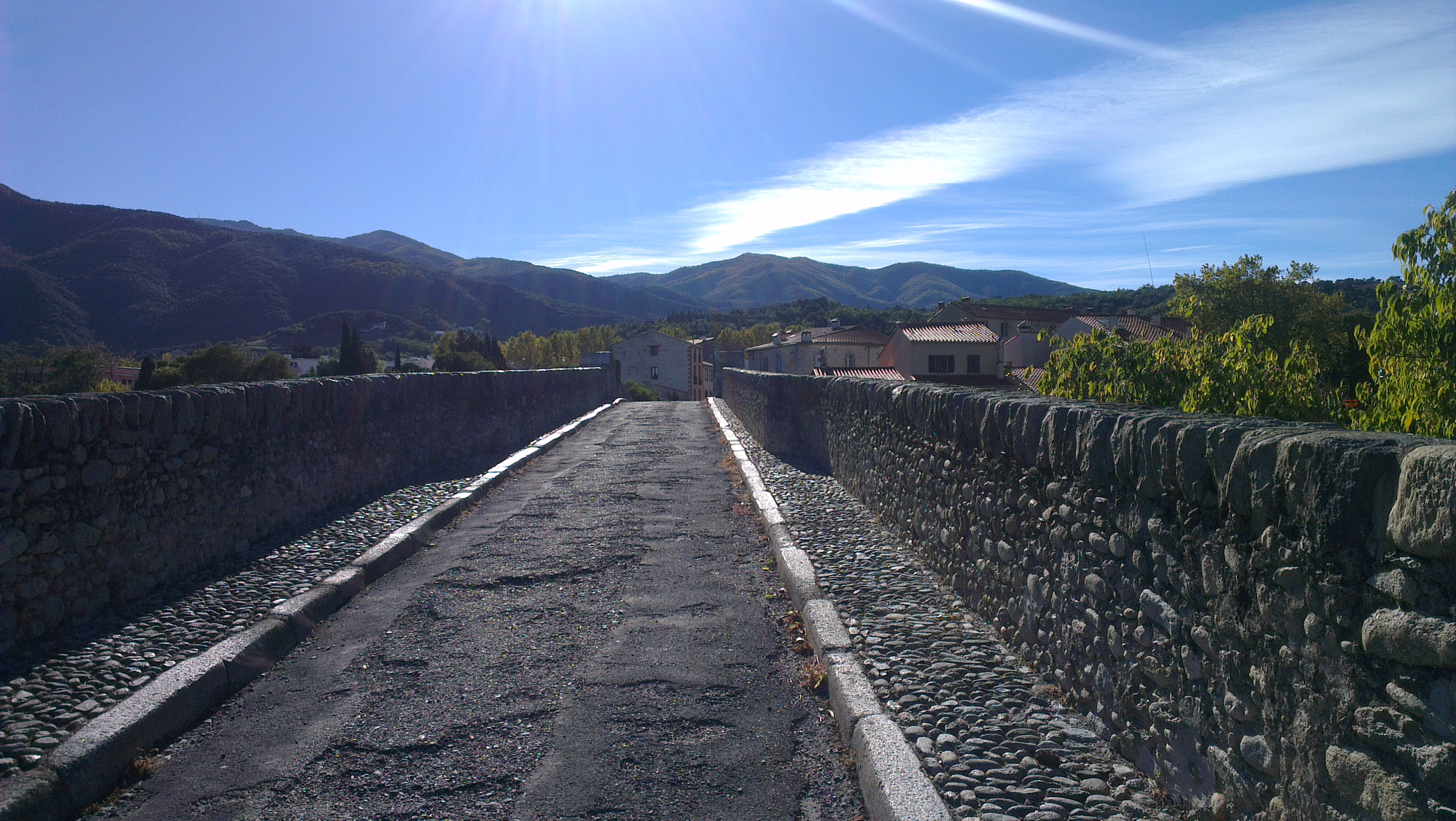

== See also ==
- List of bridges in France
- List of medieval bridges in France

Other very large medieval bridges

- Puente del Diablo (Martorell) (37.3 m span)
- Ponte della Maddalena (37.8 m span)
- Puente de San Martín (Toledo) (40 m span)
- Nyons Bridge (40.53 m span)
- Castelvecchio Bridge (48.7 m span)
- Pont Grand (Tournon-sur-Rhône) (49.2 m span)
- Pont de Vieille-Brioude (54.2 m span)
- Trezzo sull'Adda Bridge (72 m span)
