= Ponte della Maddalena =

Bridge crossing the Serchio river in Italy

Coordinates: 43°59′5.96″N 10°33′12.40″E

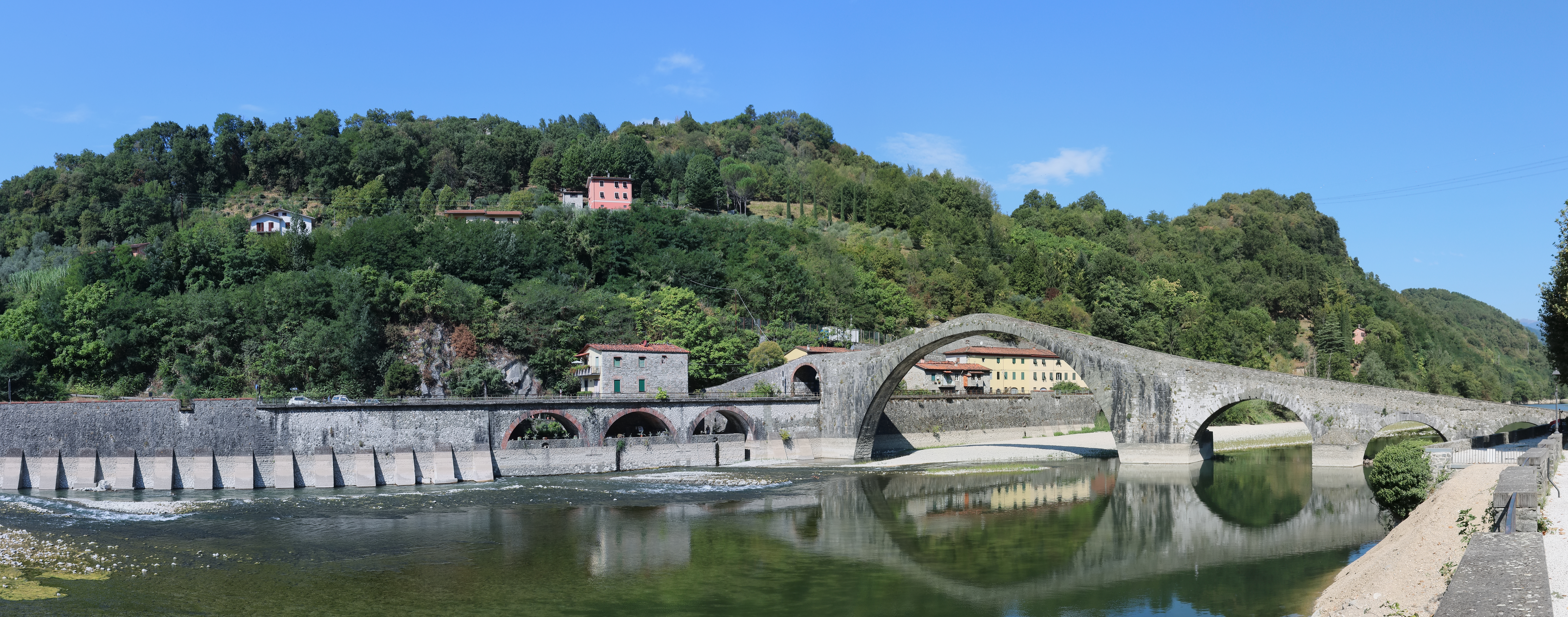
Ponte della Maddalena across the Serchio

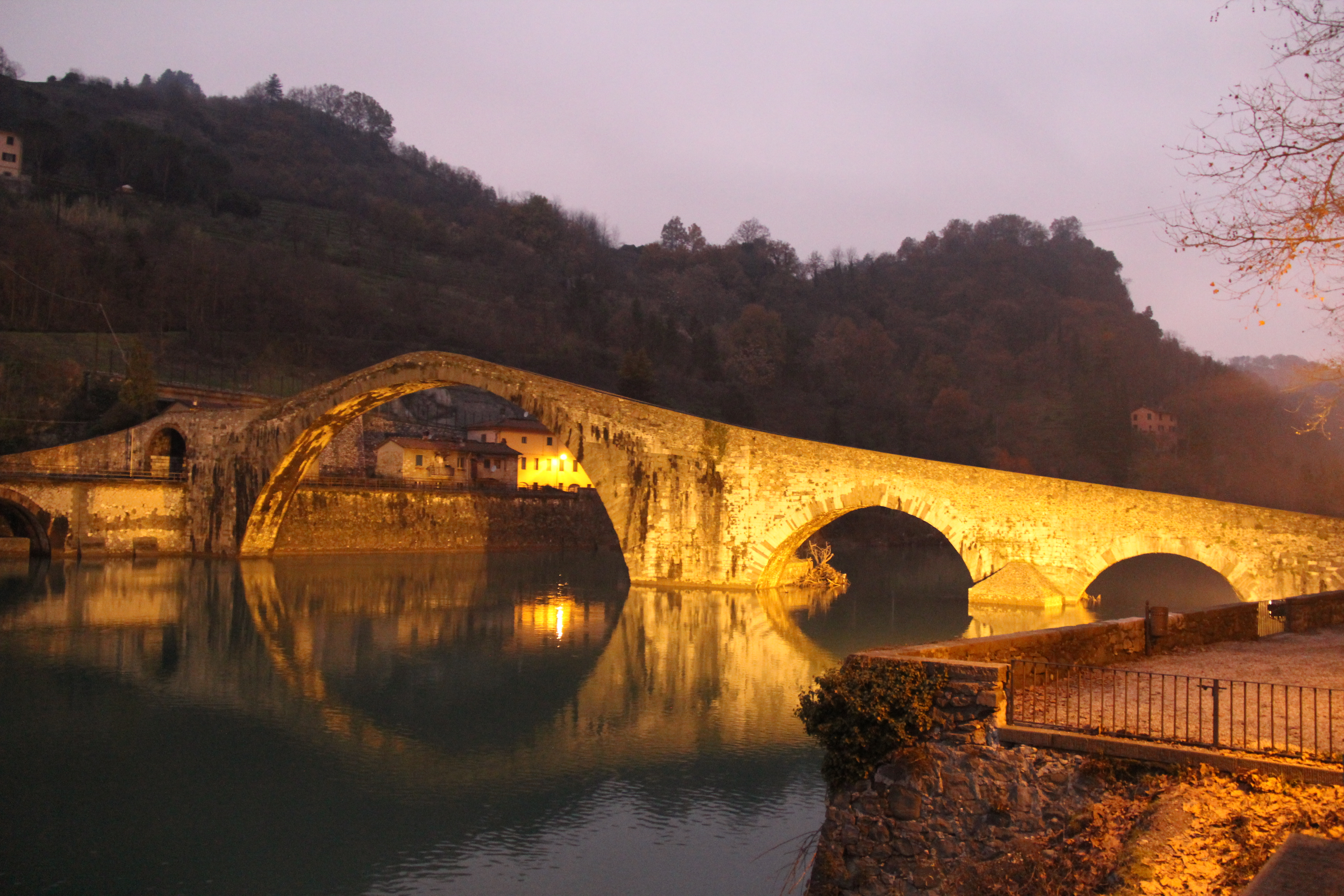
Ponte della Maddalena at night

Ponte della Maddalena is a deck arch bridge crossing the Serchio river near the town of Borgo a Mozzano in the Italian province of Lucca. It's one of numerous medieval bridges known as Ponte del Diavolo, the "Bridge of the Devil", it was a vital river crossing on the Via Francigena, an early medieval road to Rome for those coming from France that was an important medieval pilgrimage route.

The bridge is a remarkable example of medieval engineering, probably commissioned by the Countess Matilda of Tuscany c. 1080-1100. It was renovated c. 1300 under the direction of Castruccio Castracani. The largest span is 37.8 m. The bridge is also described in a 14th-century novella by Giovanni Sercambi of Lucca.

Circa 1500 it took on the name of Ponte della Maddalena, from an oratory dedicated to Mary Magdalene, whose statue stood at the foot of the bridge on the eastern bank.

In 1670 the General Council of the Republic of Lucca issued a decree prohibiting passage over the bridge with millstones and sacks of flour in order to preserve the structure.

In 1836, after being badly damaged during a flood, the bridge underwent urgent repair work.

== See also ==
Other large medieval bridges

- Puente del Diablo (Martorell) (37.3 m span)
- Puente de San Martín (Toledo) (40 m span)
- Nyons Bridge (40.53 m span)
- Pont du Diable (Céret) (45.45 m span)
- Castelvecchio Bridge (48.7 m span)
- Pont Grand (Tournon-sur-Rhône) (49.2 m span)
- Pont de Vieille-Brioude (54.2 m span)
- Trezzo sull'Adda Bridge (72 m span)
