= Pont de Vieille-Brioude =

Bridge in France

Coordinates: 45°15′38″N 3°24′30″E

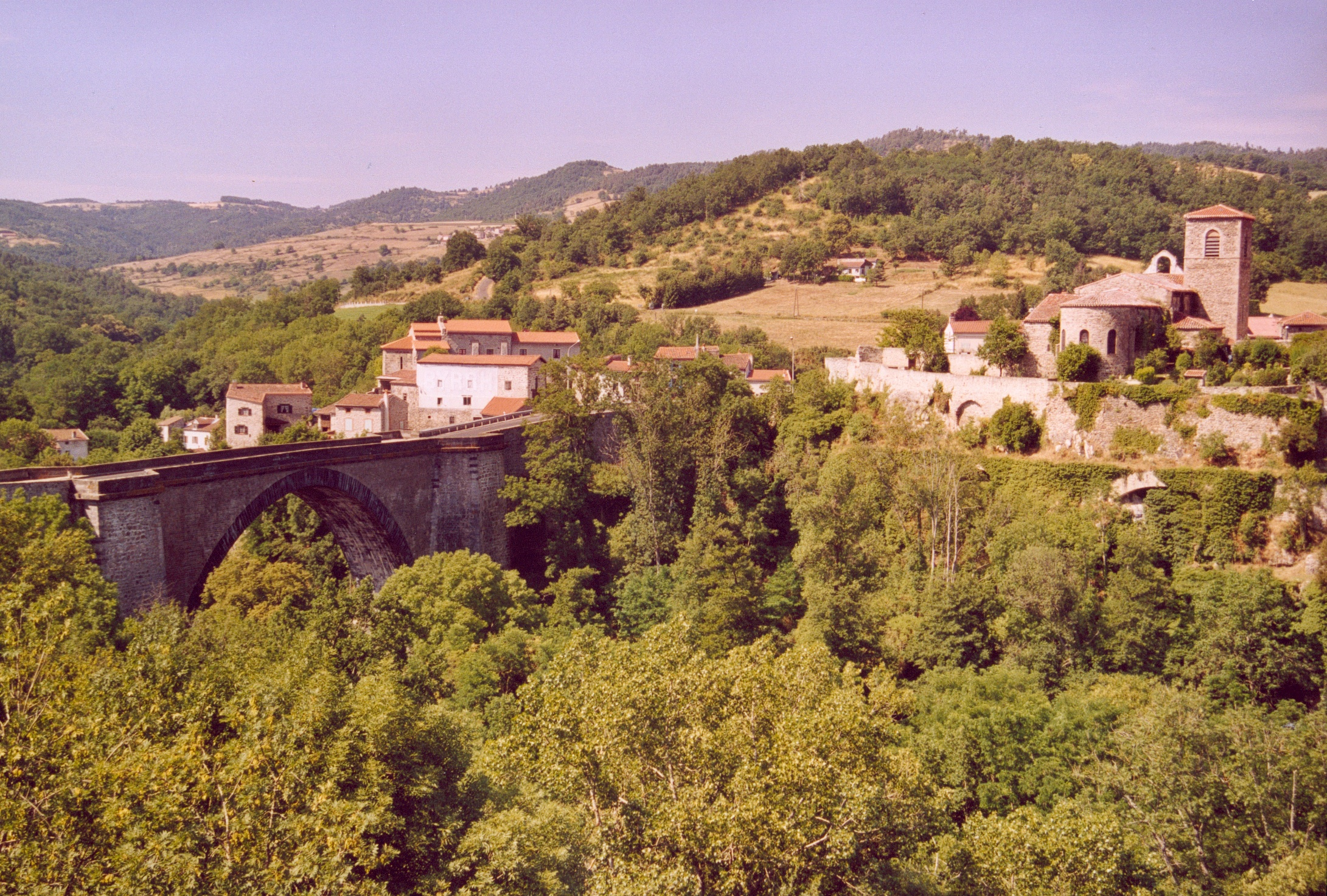
The third and present bridge

Pont de Vieille-Brioude (Vieille-Brioude Bridge) is located in France, crossing the river Allier. It is a masonry arch bridge with a span of 45 metres (148 ft) that was built in 1832.

The predecessor of this bridge on the same site was probably built in 1479 and had a span of 54 metres (177 ft), making it the longest existing arch span for some three hundred years. The bridge was ordered by local resident Lady de Dombes and built by Grenier and Estone similar to how Pont Grand (Tournon-sur-Rhône) was later built. The completion of the bridge was delayed for years because of some controversy. The bridge was too narrow, and its approaches were too steep to be used by carts. It collapsed on 27 March 1822, at 6 am.

Before any stone bridge had been built on this site, there was a wooden bridge.

== See also ==
- List of bridges in France
- List of medieval bridges in France

Other very large medieval bridges

- Puente del Diablo (Martorell) (37.3 m span)
- Ponte della Maddalena (37.8 m span)
- Puente de San Martín (Toledo) (40 m span)
- Nyons Bridge (40.53 m span)
- Pont du Diable (Céret) (45.45 m span)
- Castelvecchio Bridge (48.70 m span)
- Pont Grand (Tournon-sur-Rhône) (49.20 m span)
- Trezzo sull'Adda Bridge (72 m span, but only fragments remain)
