= Trezzo sull'Adda Bridge =

Medieval bridge in Lombardy, Italy

Trezzo Bridge
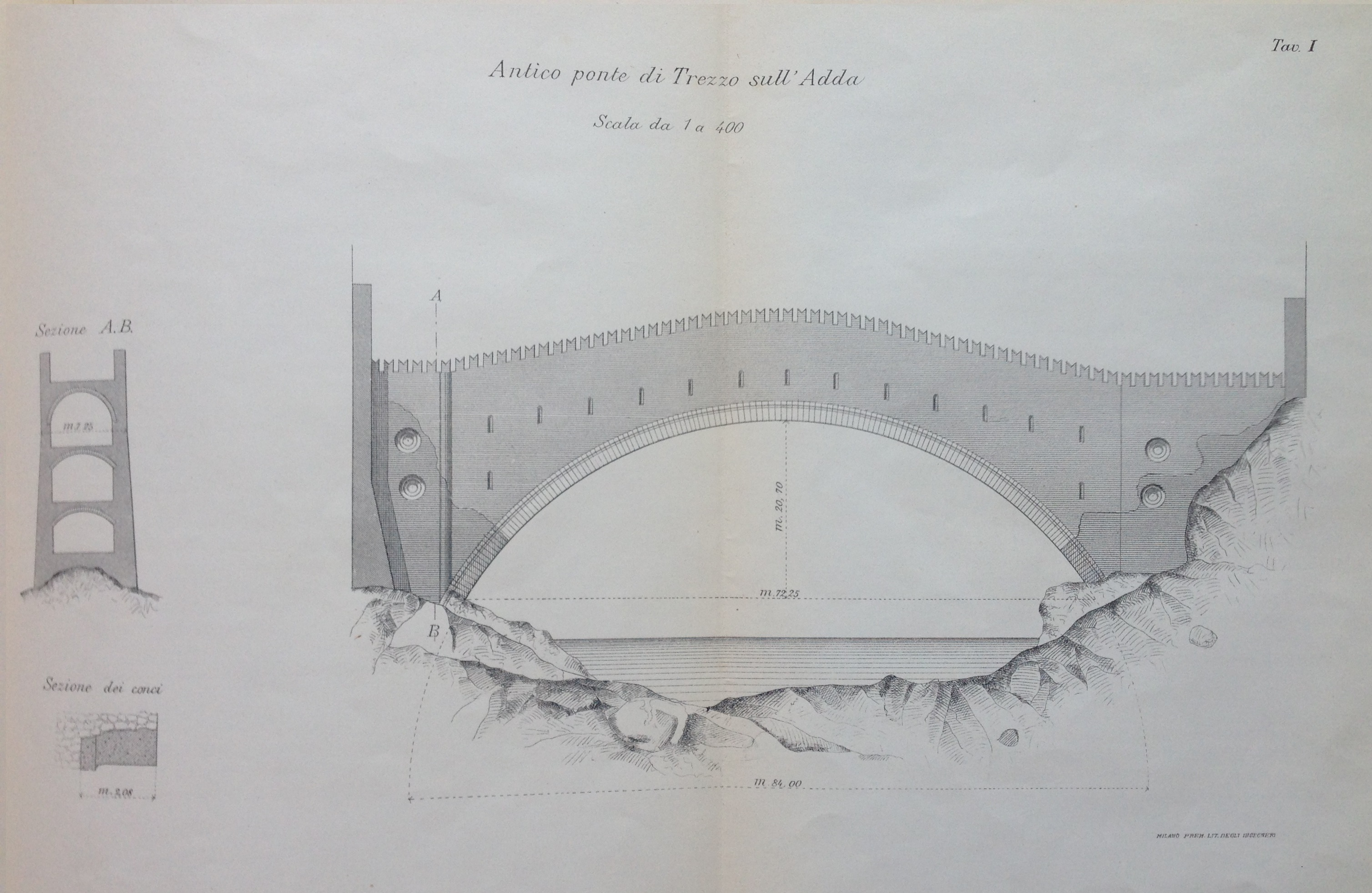
- Reconstructive drawing (surviving parts in dark grey)
- Coordinates: 45°36′42″N 9°31′20″E
- Carries: Two overlapped lanes for pedestrian, horses, carts, and wagons
- Crosses: Adda River
- Locale: Trezzo sull'Adda, Capriate San Gervasio

Characteristics
- Design: Arch bridge
- Material: Sandstone
- Total length: 72.25 metres (237.0 ft)
- Width: 9 metres (30 ft)
- Height: 20.7 metres (68 ft) intrados
- Longest span: 72.25 metres (237.0 ft)

History
- Designer: unknown
- Constructed by: Bernabò Visconti
- Opened: 1377
- Closed: 1416

The Trezzo sull'Adda Bridge or Trezzo Bridge was a medieval bridge at Trezzo sull'Adda in Lombardy, Italy, spanning the Adda river. Completed in 1377, the single-arch bridge held the record for the largest span for over four hundred years, until the beginnings of the Industrial Age, while it was not until the early 20th century that masonry bridges with larger openings were constructed.

== History ==
The Trezzo Bridge was built between 1370 and 1377 by order of the lord of Milan Bernabò Visconti. Fortified with towers, it provided access to the Visconti Castle high above the Adda. During a siege in 1416, the condottiero Carmagnola deliberately caused the structure to collapse by weakening one of its abutments.

Its single arch featured a span of 72 metres (236 ft), according to other sources even as much as 76 m (249 ft). By comparison, the second largest pre-industrial bridge vault, the French Pont de Vieille-Brioude, spans 45 m (148 ft). The rise of the segmental arch was ca. 21 m (69 ft), with a span-to-rise ratio of 3.3:1. The arch rip, measured at the springing, was 2.25 m (7.4 ft) thick, corresponding to a favourable ratio of rib thickness to clear span of only 1/32. The sandstone bridge was almost 9 m (30 ft) wide. Today, the two abutments with overhanging remnants of the arch vault are all that remain.

The Trezzo Bridge was not matched until the metal Wearmouth Bridge of the same span was built at Sunderland, England, in 1796. Longer masonry arch spans were not achieved until the 1903 Adolphe Bridge in Luxembourg.

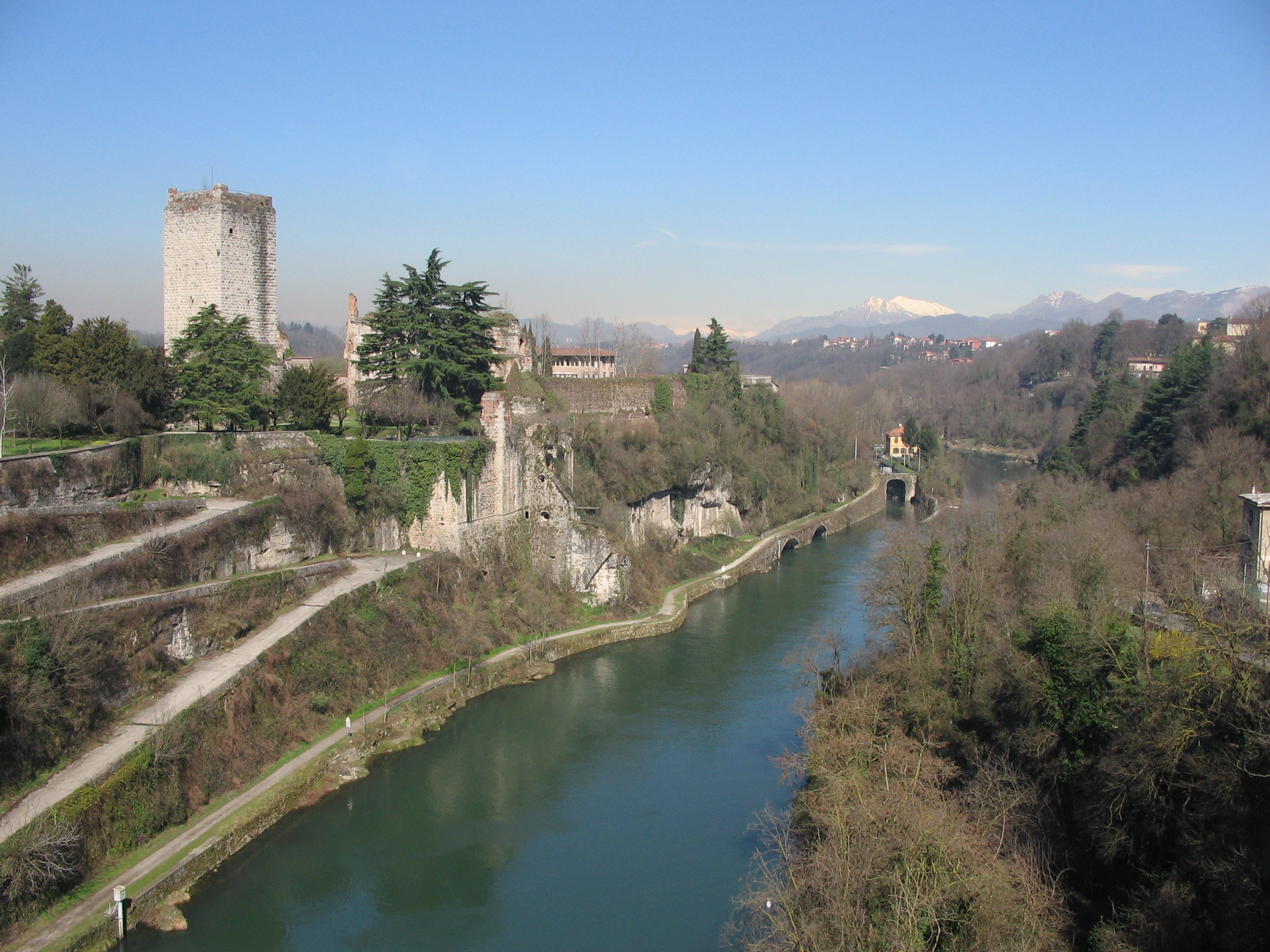
The Trezzo sull'Adda Bridge provided access to the Visconti Castle over the Adda. At the left-hand side, one abutment with remnants of the sharply rising arch vault is visible.

== See also ==
- Pont de Vieille-Brioude (54 m span)
- Pont Grand (Tournon-sur-Rhône) (49.2 m span)
- Castelvecchio Bridge (48.7 m span)
- Pont du Diable (Céret) (45.45 m span)
- Nyons Bridge (40.53 m span)
- Puente de San Martín (Toledo) (40 m span)
- Ponte della Maddalena (37.8 m span)
- Pont del Diable (37.3 m span)
- Dyavolski most (13 m span)

== Sources ==
- Crivelli, Ariberto (1886). Gli avanzi del castello di Trezzo – L'antico ed il nuovo ponte sull'Adda (in Italian). Milan: Prem. Tipo-Litografia degli Ingegneri. OCLC 878911168.
- Degrand, Ernest (1888). Ponts en maçonnerie. Volume 2 (in French). Paris: Baudry et C.ie, Libraires-Éditeurs. OCLC 313866610.
- Fernández Troyano, Leonardo (2003). Bridge Engineering. A Global Perspective. London: Thomas Telford Publishing. ISBN 9780727732156. OCLC 54805294.
- Garrison, Ervan G. (1999). A History of Engineering and Technology. Boca Raton, Florida: CRC Press. ISBN 9780849398100. OCLC 38474203.
- Hill, Donald (1984). A History of Engineering in Classical and Medieval Times. La Salle, Illinois: Routledge. ISBN 9780875484228. OCLC 10723141.
- Lay, Maxwell Gordon (1992). Ways of the World: A History of the World's Roads and of the Vehicles That Used Them. New Brunswick, New Jersey: Rutgers University Press. ISBN 9780813526911. OCLC 24010058.
- O'Connor, Colin (1993). Roman Bridges. Cambridge: Cambridge University Press. ISBN 9780521393263. OCLC 26543269.
- Straub, Hans (1992). Die Geschichte der Bauingenieurkunst. Ein Überblick von der Antike bis in die Neuzeit (in German). Basel: Birkhäuser Verlag. ISBN 9783764324414. OCLC 27082686.
