= Saint-Jean-de-Muzols =

- Commune
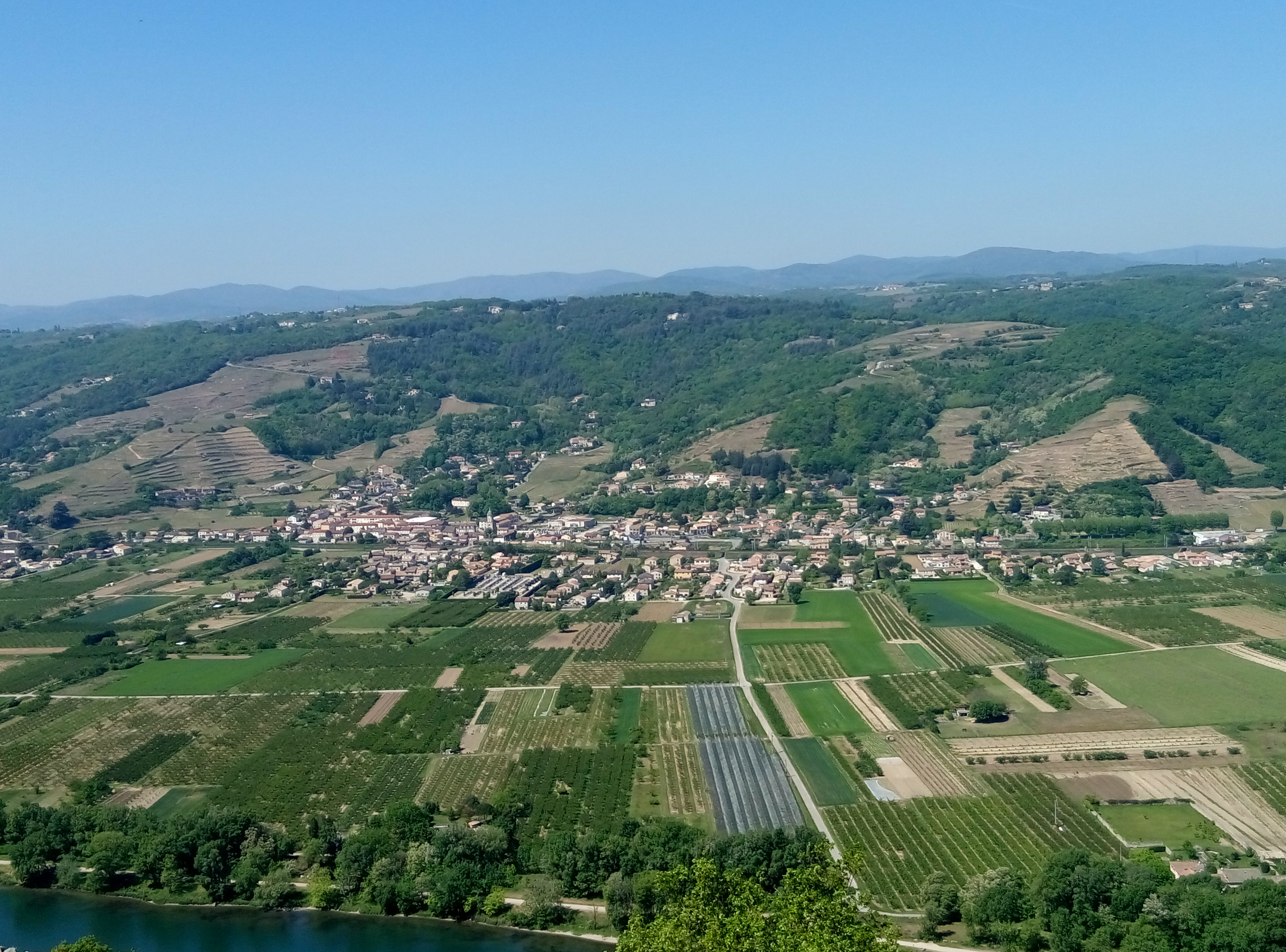
- General view

- Coat of arms
- Location of Saint-Jean-de-Muzols
- Location within France Location within Auvergne-Rhône-Alpes
- Coordinates: 45°04′56″N 4°48′52″E
- Country: France
- Region: Auvergne-Rhône-Alpes
- Department: Ardèche
- Arrondissement: Tournon-sur-Rhône
- Canton: Tournon-sur-Rhône
- Intercommunality: CA Arche Agglo

Government
  - Mayor (2020–2026): Jean-Paul Clozel
- Area^{1}: 10.68 km^{2} (4.12 sq mi)
- Elevation: 130 m (430 ft)
- Highest elevation: 418 m (1,371 ft)
- Lowest elevation: 109 m (358 ft)
- Population (2023): 2,489
  - Density: 233.1/km^{2} (603.6/sq mi)
- Time zone: UTC+01:00 (CET)
  - Summer (DST): UTC+02:00 (CEST)
- INSEE/Postal code: 07245 /07300
- ^{1} French Land Register data, which excludes lakes, ponds, glaciers > 1 km^{2} (0.386 sq mi or 247 acres) and river estuaries.

Saint-Jean-de-Muzols (French pronunciation: [sɛ̃ ʒɑ̃ də myzɔl]; Vivaro-Alpine: Sant Joan de Mosol) is a commune in the Ardèche department in southern France.

== Population ==
Historical population

Year	Pop.	±% p.a.
1793	575	—
1800	620	+1.08%
1806	583	−1.02%
1821	597	+0.16%
1831	676	+1.25%
1836	801	+3.45%
1841	905	+2.47%
1846	955	+1.08%
1851	987	+0.66%
1856	1,114	+2.45%
1861	1,105	−0.16%
1866	1,151	+0.82%
1872	1,139	−0.17%
1876	1,332	+3.99%
1881	1,120	−3.41%
1886	1,016	−1.93%
1891	1,074	+1.12%
1896	1,062	−0.22%
1901	1,065	+0.06%

Year	Pop.	±% p.a.
1906	1,038	−0.51%
1911	965	−1.45%
1921	883	−0.88%
1926	904	+0.47%
1931	964	+1.29%
1936	1,016	+1.06%
1946	1,007	−0.09%
1954	1,038	+0.38%
1962	1,056	+0.22%
1968	1,263	+3.03%
1975	1,532	+2.80%
1982	1,955	+3.54%
1990	2,315	+2.14%
1999	2,394	+0.37%
2007	2,446	+0.27%
2012	2,442	−0.03%
2017	2,458	+0.13%
2023	2,489	+0.21%

Source: EHESS and INSEE (1968-2023)

== See also ==
- Pont Grand
- Communes of the Ardèche department
