= Ponte Gobbo =

Bridge in Bobbio, Italy

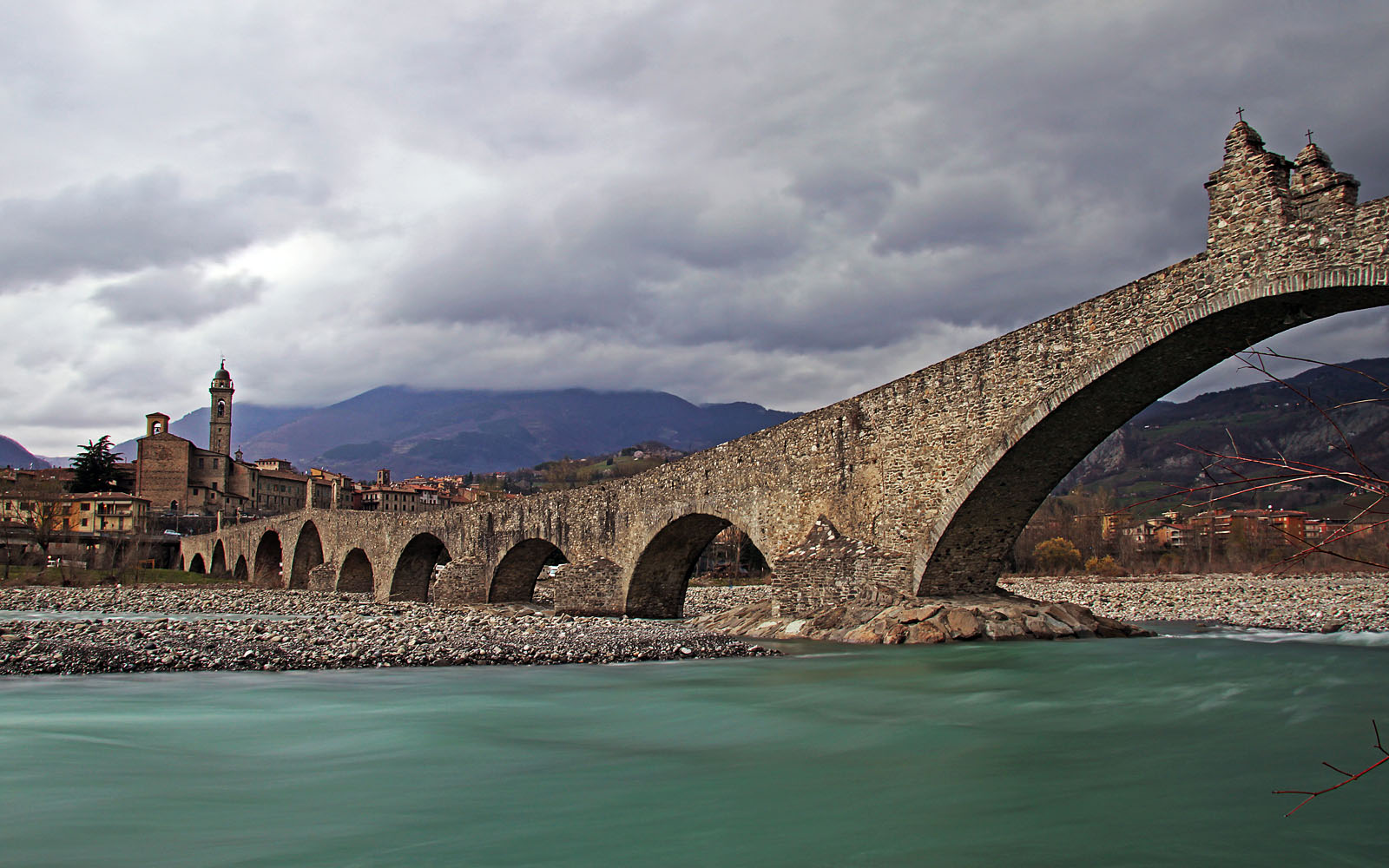
- Coordinates: 44.76716°N 9.39077°E
- Crosses: Trebbia
- Locale: Italy

Location
- Interactive map of Ponte Gobbo

The Ponte Gobbo (also known as Ponte Vecchio or Ponte del Diavolo) it is an ancient bridge with an irregular profile, which crosses the river Trebbia in Bobbio in the province of Piacenza.

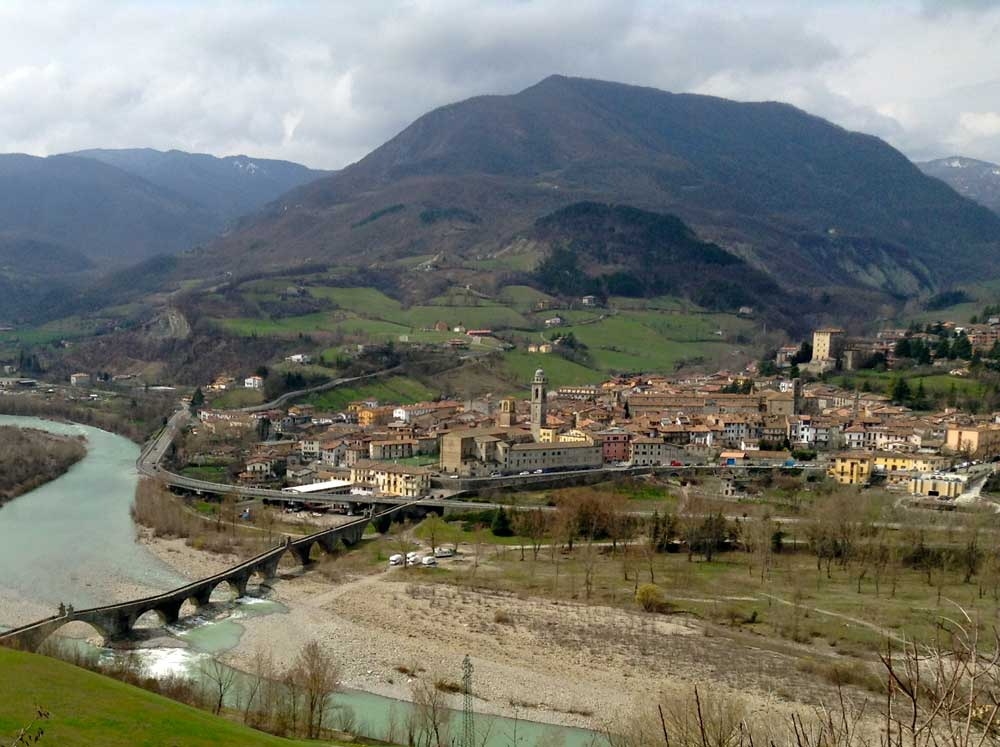
Panorama of Bobbio and the Ponte Gobbo

== History ==
The construction period of the Ponte Vecchio, known as the "hunchback" due to the irregularity and hump of its arches, cannot be dated, but it dates back to the Roman era and it can be assumed that it was built after the Roman conquest of the then Ligurian-Celtic village; it underwent numerous renovations in subsequent eras.

Until the 16th century, the bridge consisted of just a few arches: a large one on the right bank of the Trebbia, with three smaller ones. Flooding over the years had inflicted repeated damage to the stone bridge, which was always patiently rebuilt, sometimes with substantial modifications to improve its safety and strength.

According to scholar Carla Glori, this would be the bridge depicted in the background of Leonardo da Vinci's Mona Lisa.
