= Castelvecchio Bridge =

Fortified bridge in Verona, Italy

Coordinates: 45°26′25″N 10°59′14″E

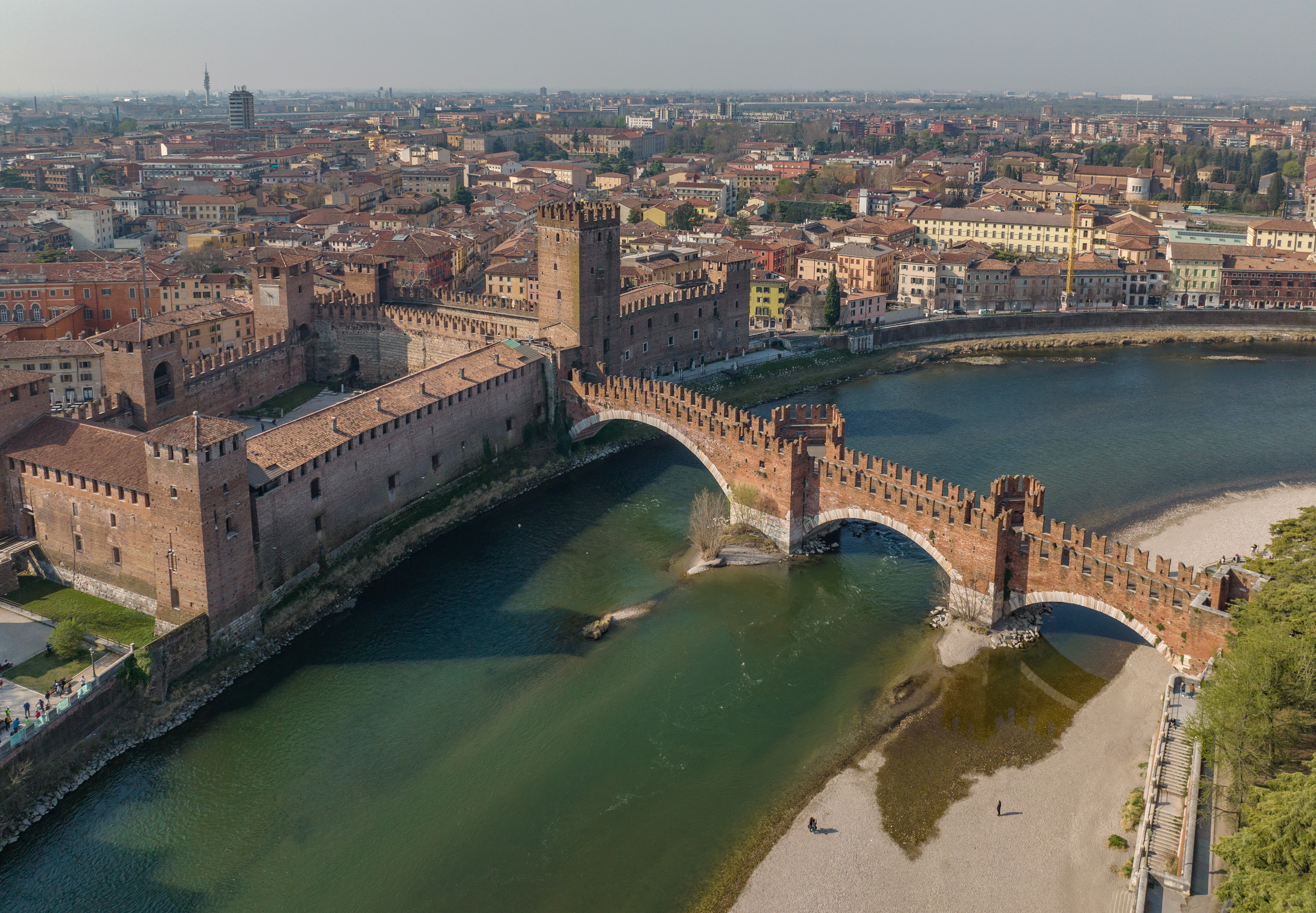
Castel Vecchio Bridge.

The Castel Vecchio Bridge (Italian: Ponte di Castel Vecchio) or Scaliger Bridge (Italian: Ponte Scaligero) is a fortified bridge in Verona, northern Italy, over the Adige River. The segmental arch bridge featured the world's largest span at the time of its construction (48.70 m).

== History ==
It was built (most likely in 1354–1356) by Cangrande II della Scala, to grant him a safe way of escape from the annexed eponymous castle in the event of a rebellion of the population against his tyrannic rule. The solidity of the construction allowed it to resist untouched until, in the late 18th century, the French troops destroyed the tower on the left bank (although it probably dated from the occupation of Verona by the Visconti or the Republic of Venice).

The bridge was however totally destroyed, along with the Ponte Pietra, by the retreating German troops on April 24, 1945. The bridge's reconstruction by architect Libero Cecchini began in 1949 and completed in 1951, with the exception of the left tower.

== Architecture ==
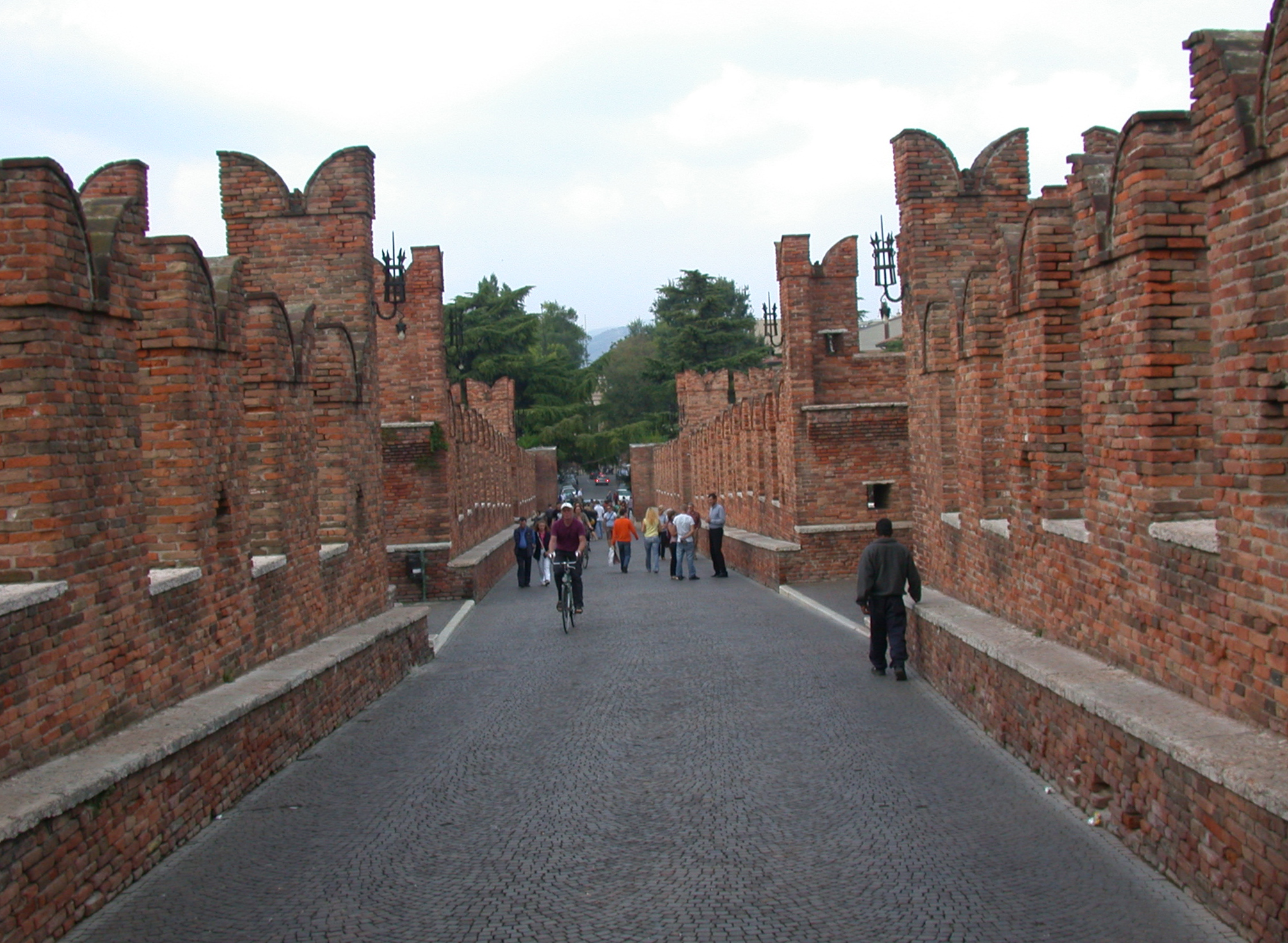
On the bridge

The bridge is in red brick in the upper part, as are all landmarks in Verona from the Scaliger era, and in white marble in the lower one. It includes three spans of decreasing length starting from pentagonal towers. The largest span, measuring 48.70 m, meant that the bridge featured at the time of its construction the world's largest bridge arch (the others measure 29.15 and 24.11 meters). The two pylons are 12.10 x 19.40 and 6.30 x 17.30 meters respectively.

The bridge has a total length of 120 m.

== Legends ==
According to a legend, Cangrande awarded the designer of the bridge, Guglielmo Bevilacqua, with a sword which had belonged to Saint Martin.

Another legend tells that the designer presented himself at the inauguration riding a horse, ready to flee away in case the bridge had crumbled down.

== See also ==
- Trezzo sull'Adda Bridge
