= Pont del Diable =

Pont del Diable (Devil's Bridge)
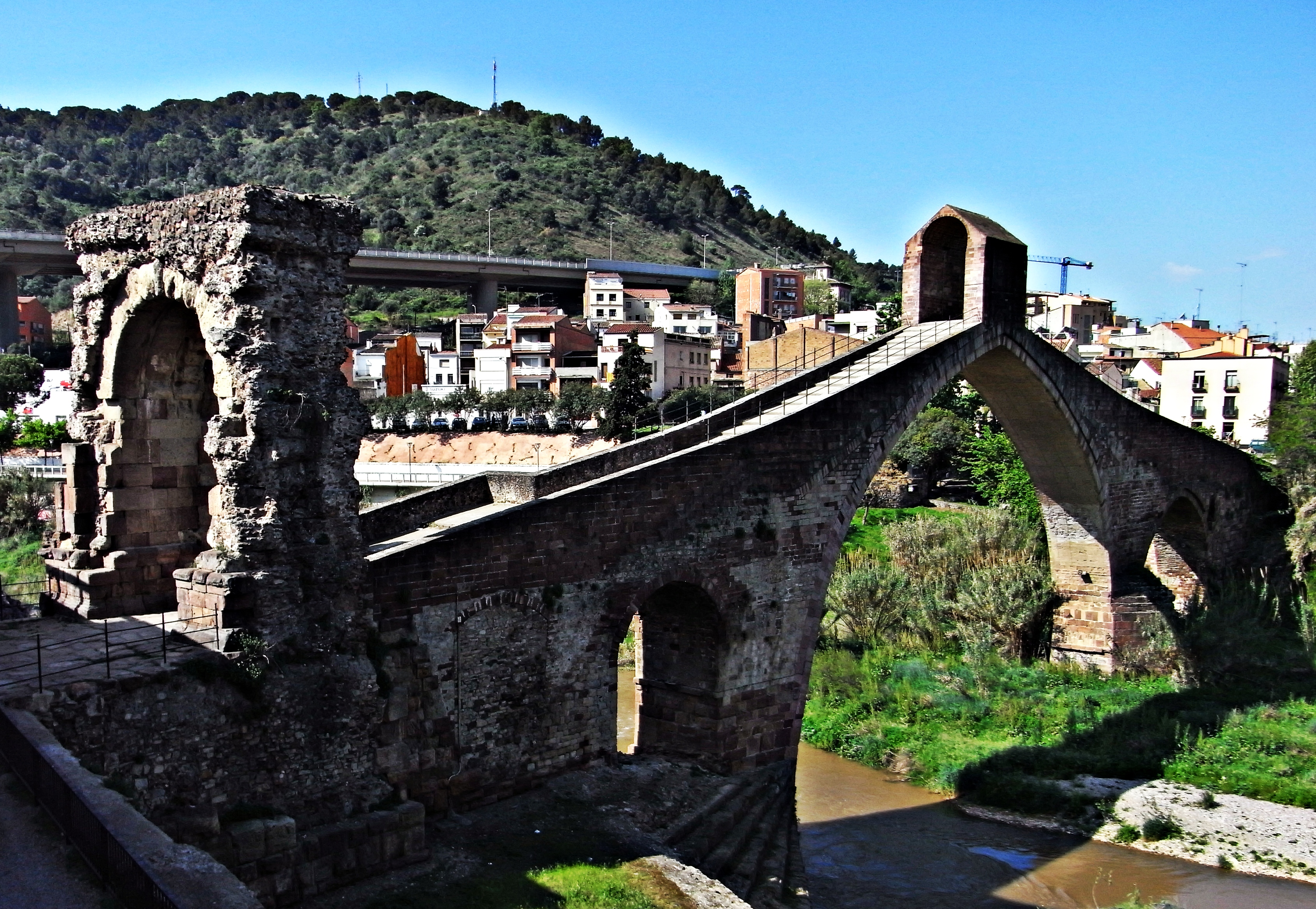
- Pont del Diable, with the Roman arch at left
- Coordinates: 41°28′30″N 1°56′16″E
- Crosses: Llobregat
- Locale: Martorell-Castellbisbal, Catalonia, Spain

Characteristics
- Design: Arch bridge
- Material: Stone
- Longest span: 37.3 m

History
- Construction end: 1283

Location
- Interactive map of Pont del Diable (Devil's Bridge)

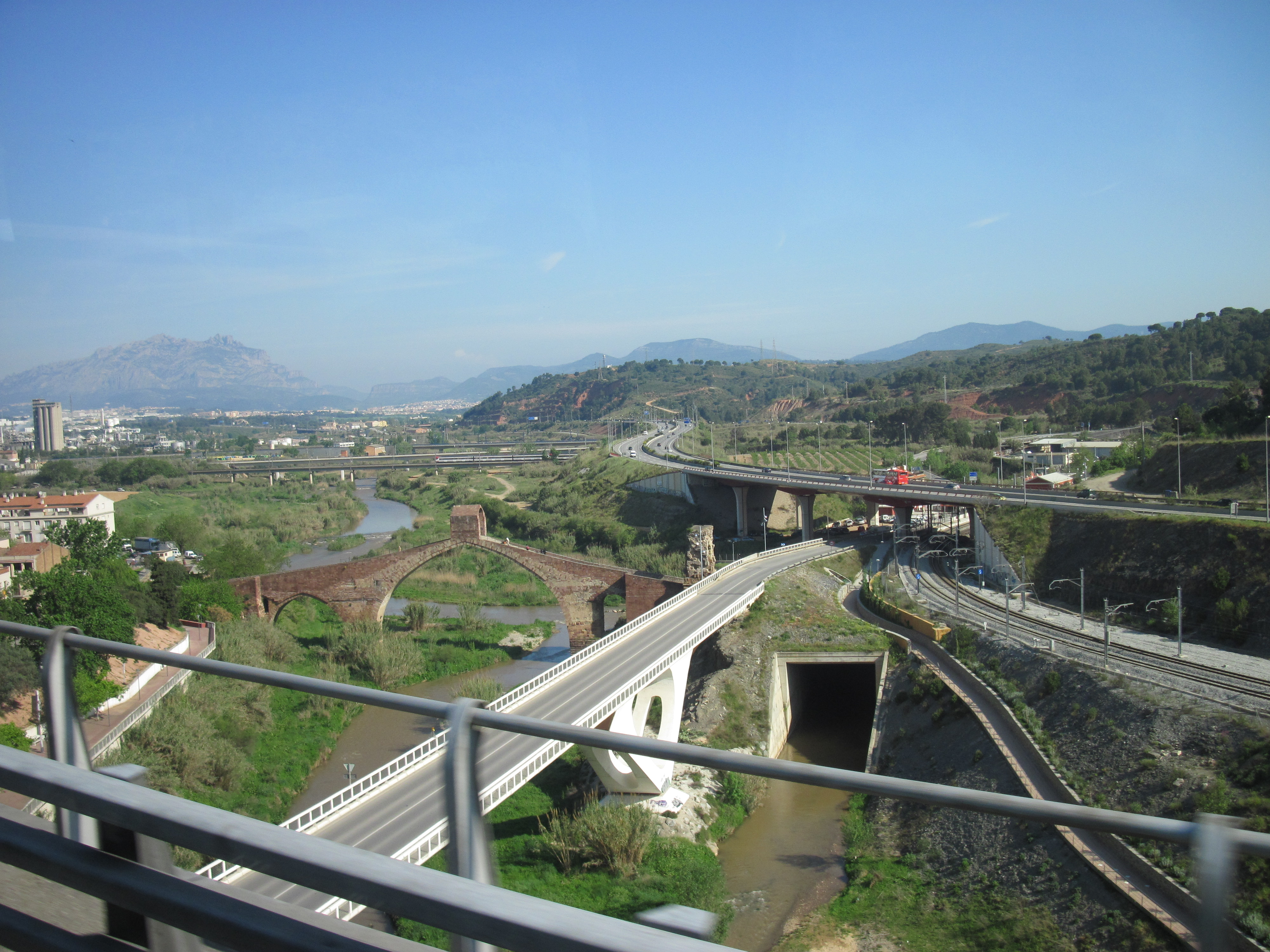
Devil's Bridge among the modern overpasses

The Pont del Diable (Spanish: Puente del Diablo, English: Devil's bridge), also known as Sant Bartomeu Bridge, is a medieval bridge crossing the river Llobregat and straddling the municipalities of Martorell and Castellbisbal in Catalonia, Spain. The bridge is restricted to pedestrians.

The present bridge, featuring a large pointed arch, is a 1965 reconstruction of the gothic bridge built in 1283 on Roman foundations by Mohammed II Emir of Granada. The main clear span is 37.3 metres (122 ft) with a stone chapel on top. A secondary arch has a span of 19.1 metres (63 ft). The bridge was destroyed in 1939 during the Spanish Civil War by retreating Republican troops, but rebuilt in 1965 in a form generally similar to the gothic structure. It is now surrounded on three sides by road flyovers and railway lines.

The original Roman bridge formed a part of the Via Augusta, and was the only bridge in the lower Llobregat valley until the 14th century. It still features a Roman triumphal arch at its eastern abutment. It is unclear how many spans the original Roman bridge had.

== See also ==
- List of Roman bridges
