= Waldeisenbahn Muskau =

German narrow-gauge railway in Saxony

Waldeisenbahn Muskau Muskau forest railway
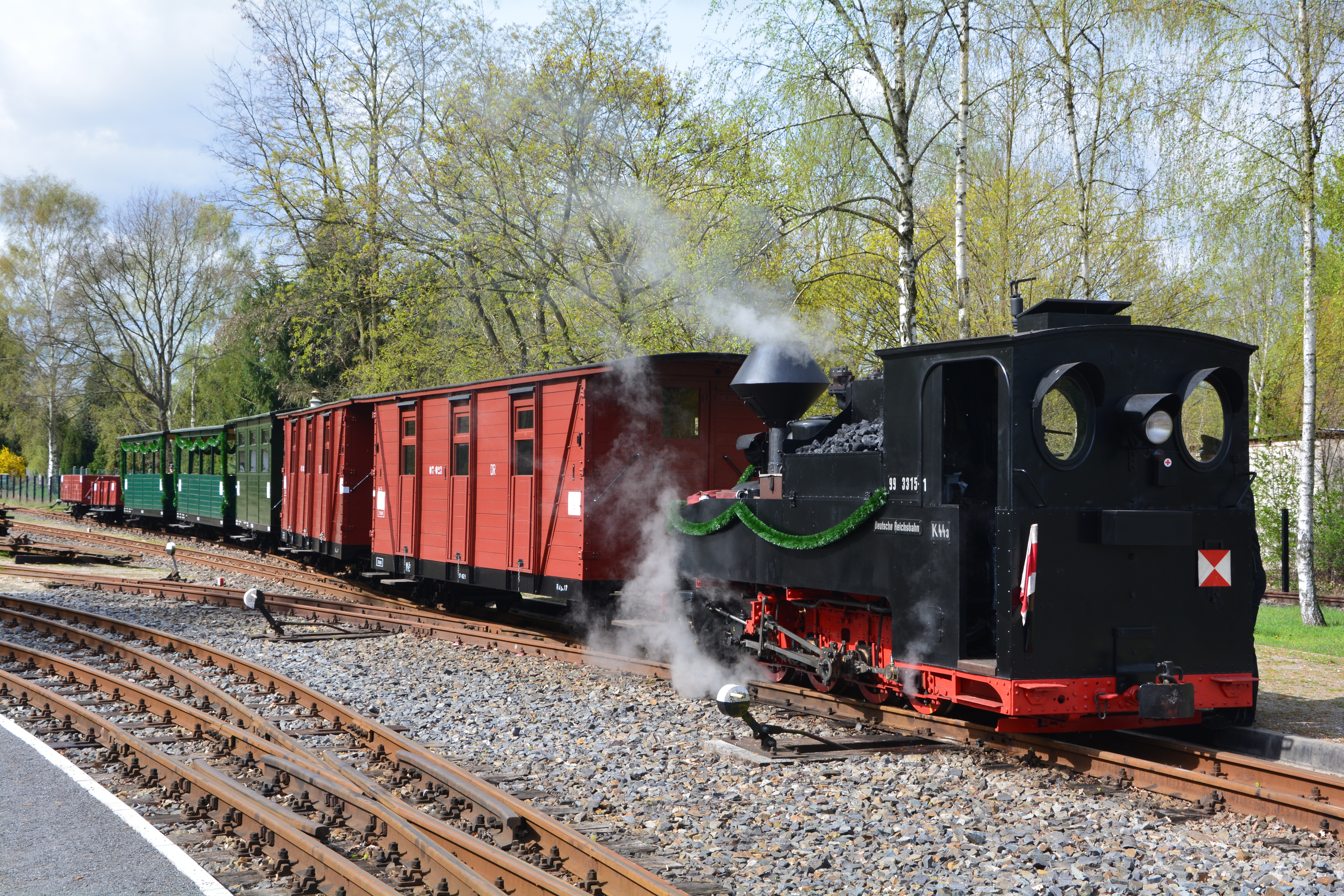
- Steam locomotive-hauled train in April 2017

Overview
- Stations: 12 stations 3 stops
- Website: waldeisenbahn.de

Service
- Type: Industrial railway (until 1978); Heritage railway
- Ridership: 53.000 (2017); 47.000 (2018)

Technical
- Line length: 20 km (12 mi)
- Track gauge: 600 mm (1 ft 11 5/8 in)

The Waldeisenbahn Muskau is a 600 mm (1 ft 11 5/8 in) narrow gauge railway connecting Kromlau, Weißwasser and Bad Muskau in Saxony, Germany. It is the longest 600 mm gauge heritage railway in Germany, with a track length of 20 km (12 mi).

== History ==
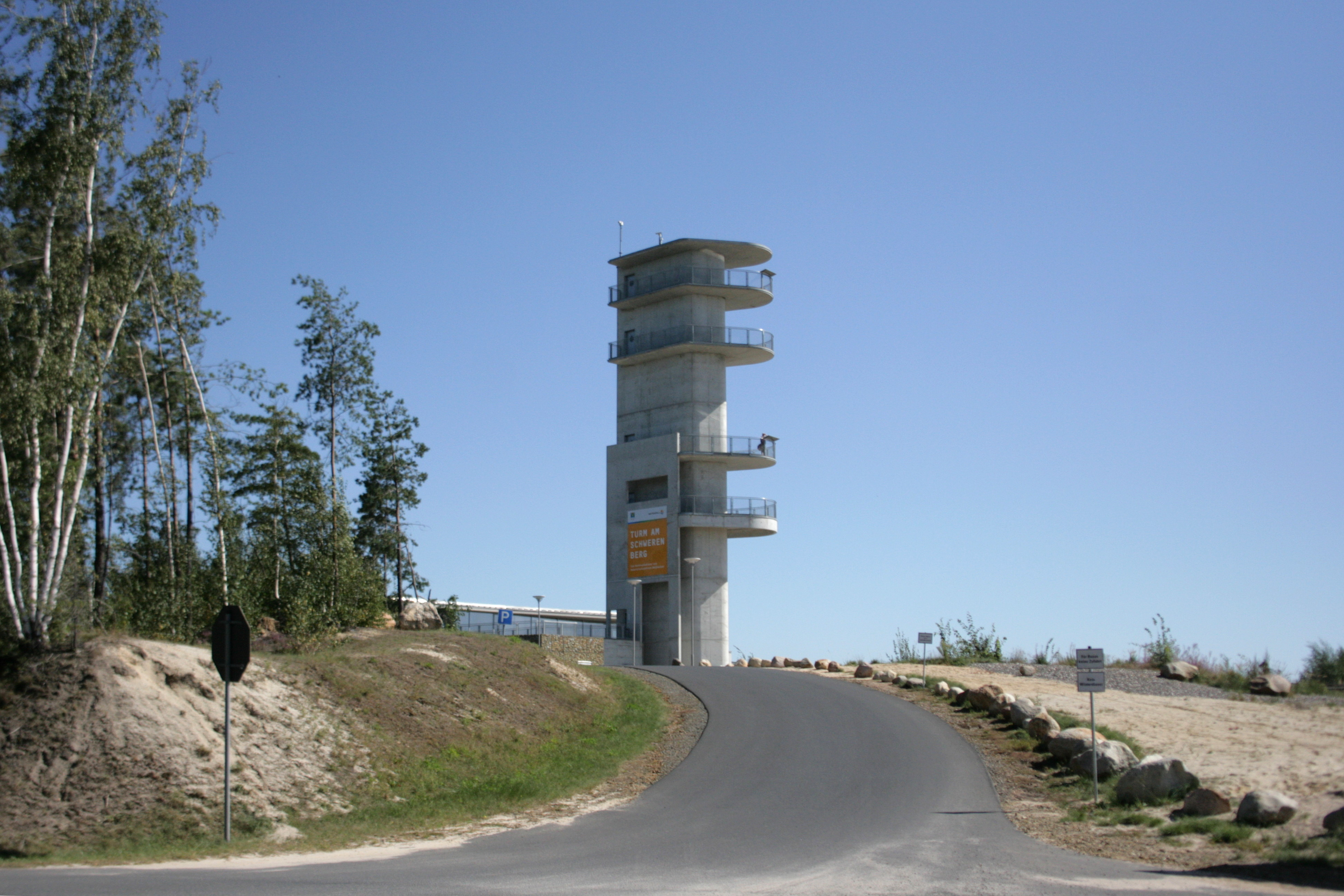
Schwerer Berg observation tower, near the new terminus of the Tonbahn

The first tracks were laid in 1895. Operation began as a horse-drawn railway, with the switch to steam locomotives beginning in 1896.

Tracks and rolling stock were damaged in the Second World War, after which reparations further restricted the operation of the Waldeisenbahn Muskau.

In 1951 the Waldeisenbahn was incorporated into the Reichsbahn. On March 21, 1978, the Minister of Transport ordered the closure of the Waldeisenbahn Muskau, which was followed by an order on March 29 to cease operation by the Cottbus railway directorate (German: Reichsbahndirektion Cottbus).

After 1978 only 10 km (6 mi) of track remained in use between Weißwasser and a brickyard, with occasional special services run by rail enthusiasts. First efforts to preserve the Waldeisenbahn Muskau were made by rail enthusiasts beginning in the 1980s. A construction staff was established by the district of Weißwasser in 1991. The line between Weißwasser and Kromlau reopened in 1992, with tourist services beginning the same year. The line to Bad Muskau was reopened in 1995. In the 1990s many people, as many as 100 simultaneously, were involved in the Waldeisenbahn as part of Arbeitsbeschaffungsmaßnahmen (job creation programs).

The Waldeisenbahn Muskau took over the Tonbahn (clay railway) between Weißwasser and the Mühlrose clay pit in 2010. Operations on the Tonbahn ceased in 2014 due to the expansion of the Tagebau Nochten open pit mine. A new 3.5 km (2 mi) alignment of the Tonbahn was inaugurated in April 2017, with the former alignment being dismantled to make way for the open pit mine. The new terminus is located near the Schwerer Berg observation tower.

A new maintenance workshop was inaugurated in 2019, eliminating the need to transport the locomotives to maintenance companies with lowboy trailers.

== Network ==
At its peak, the network had a length of over 80 km (50 mi). Most of the tracks were removed following the closure of the network in 1978. The rebuilt network between Kromlau, Weißwasser and Bad Muskau has a length of 20 km (12 mi). As of October 2018, it has 12 stations and three stops.

== Rolling stock ==
Until its closure in 1978, the Waldeisenbahn was only operated as an industrial railway, with the fleet consisting of multiple steam locomotives, diesel locomotives for shunting, and over 550 railway cars in total. Some of the original rolling stock is still used for heritage operation. Other rolling stock has been acquired from pit railways and Feldbahn systems. The current fleet consists of steam locomotives, 31 diesel locomotives, passenger cars and freight cars.

Heeresfeldbahnlokomotive HF 2257 from the Cottbuser Parkeisenbahn was used on a special event for railfans on October 12 and 13, 2019.

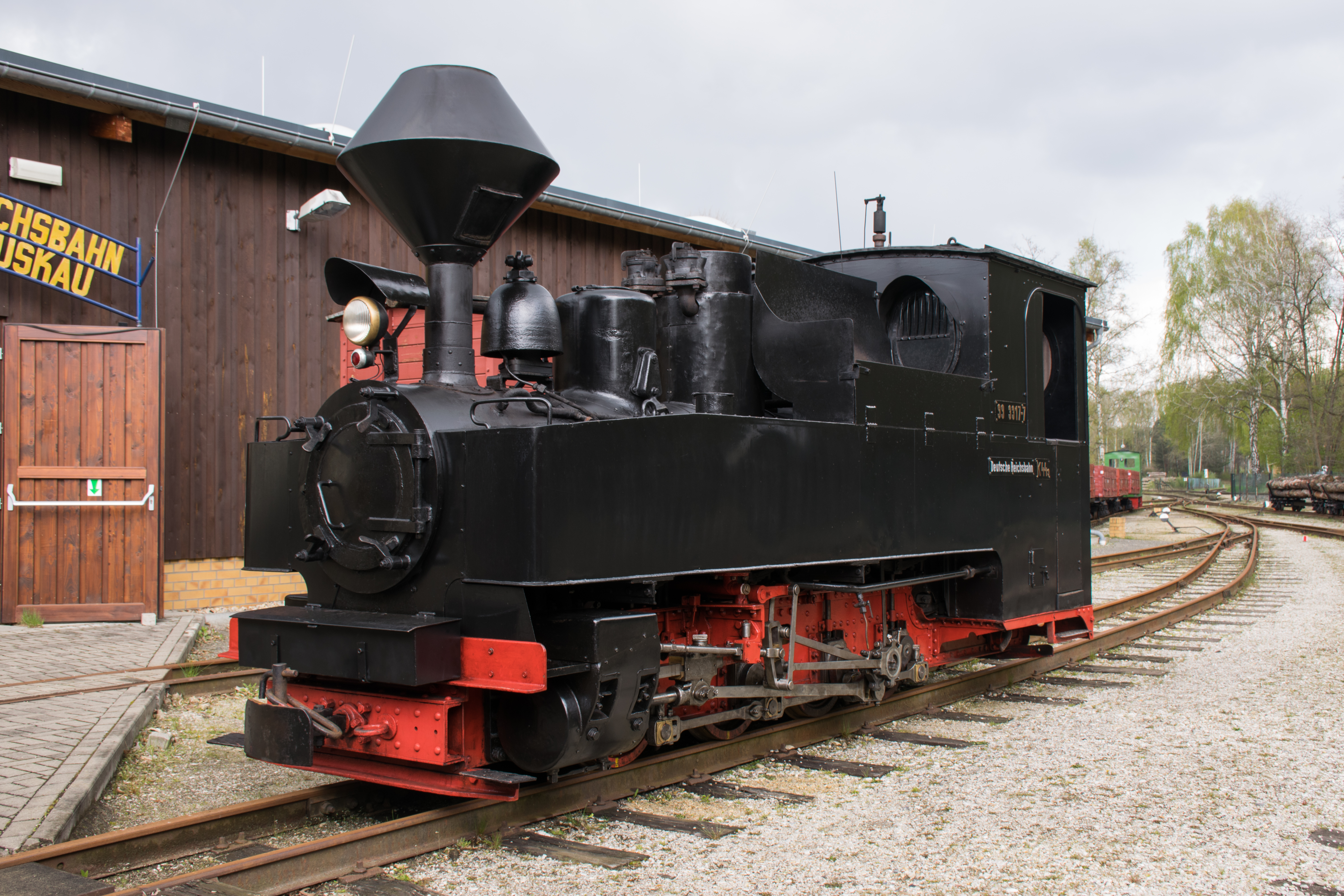
99 3317

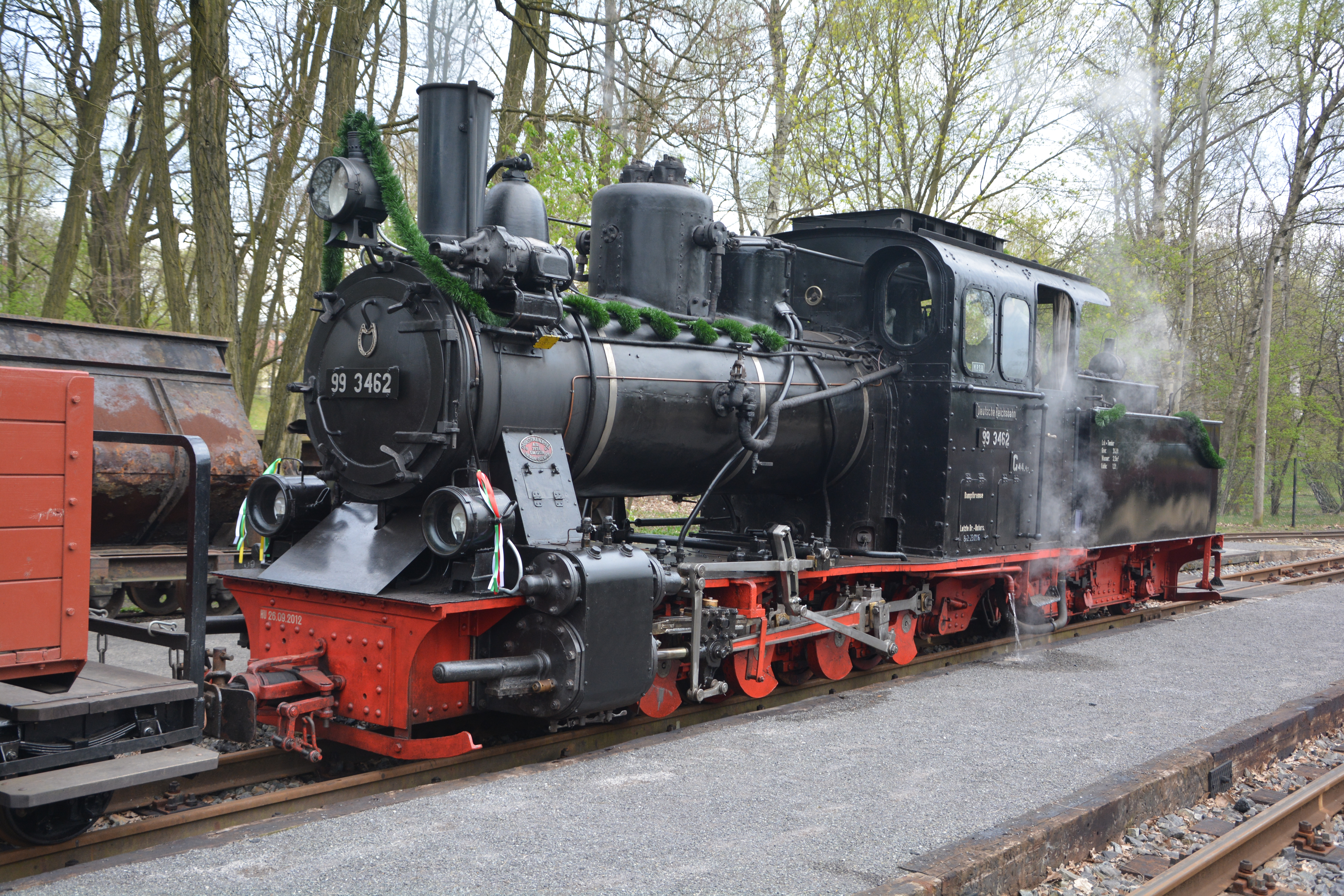
99 3462

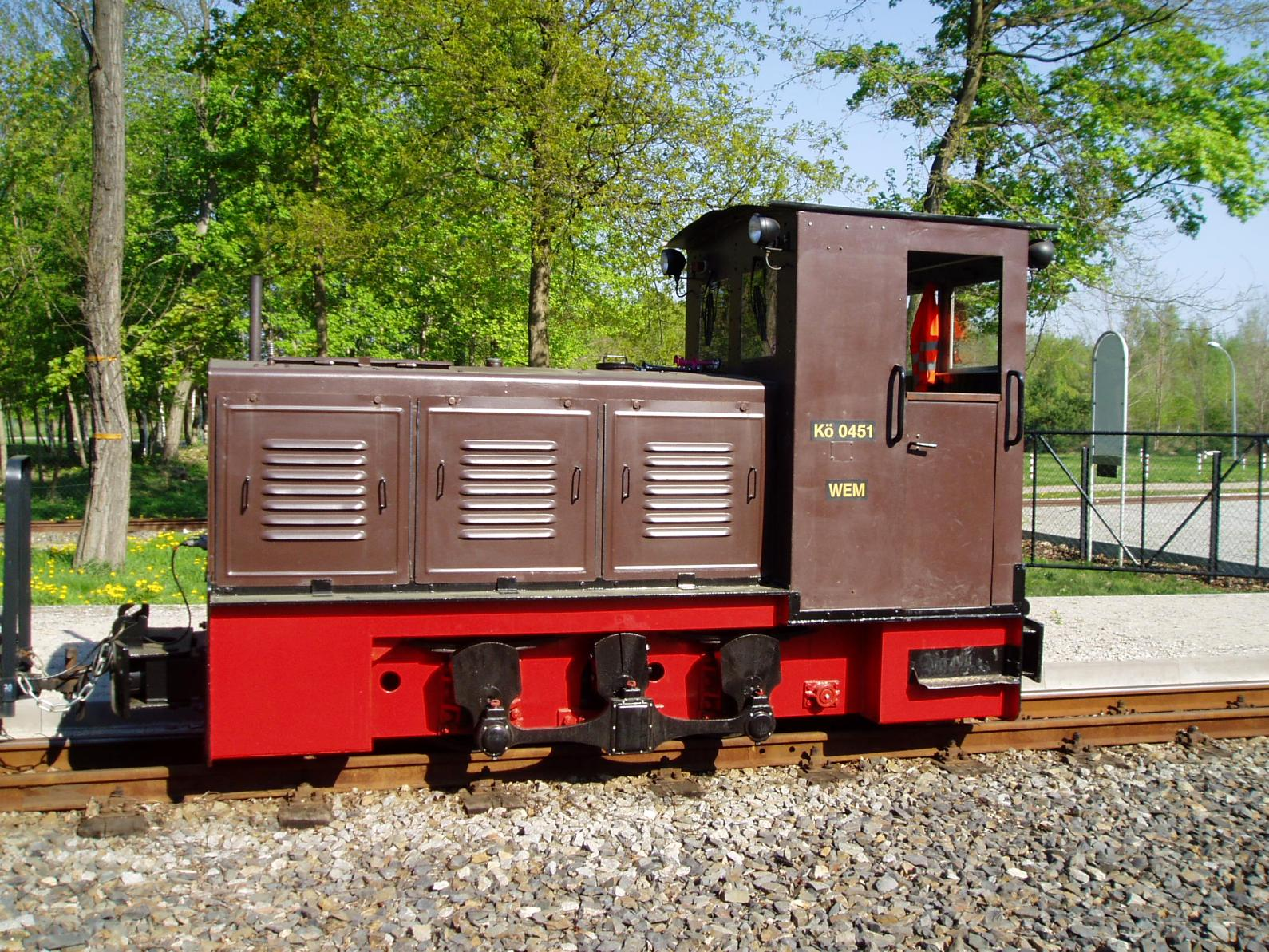
Kö 0451

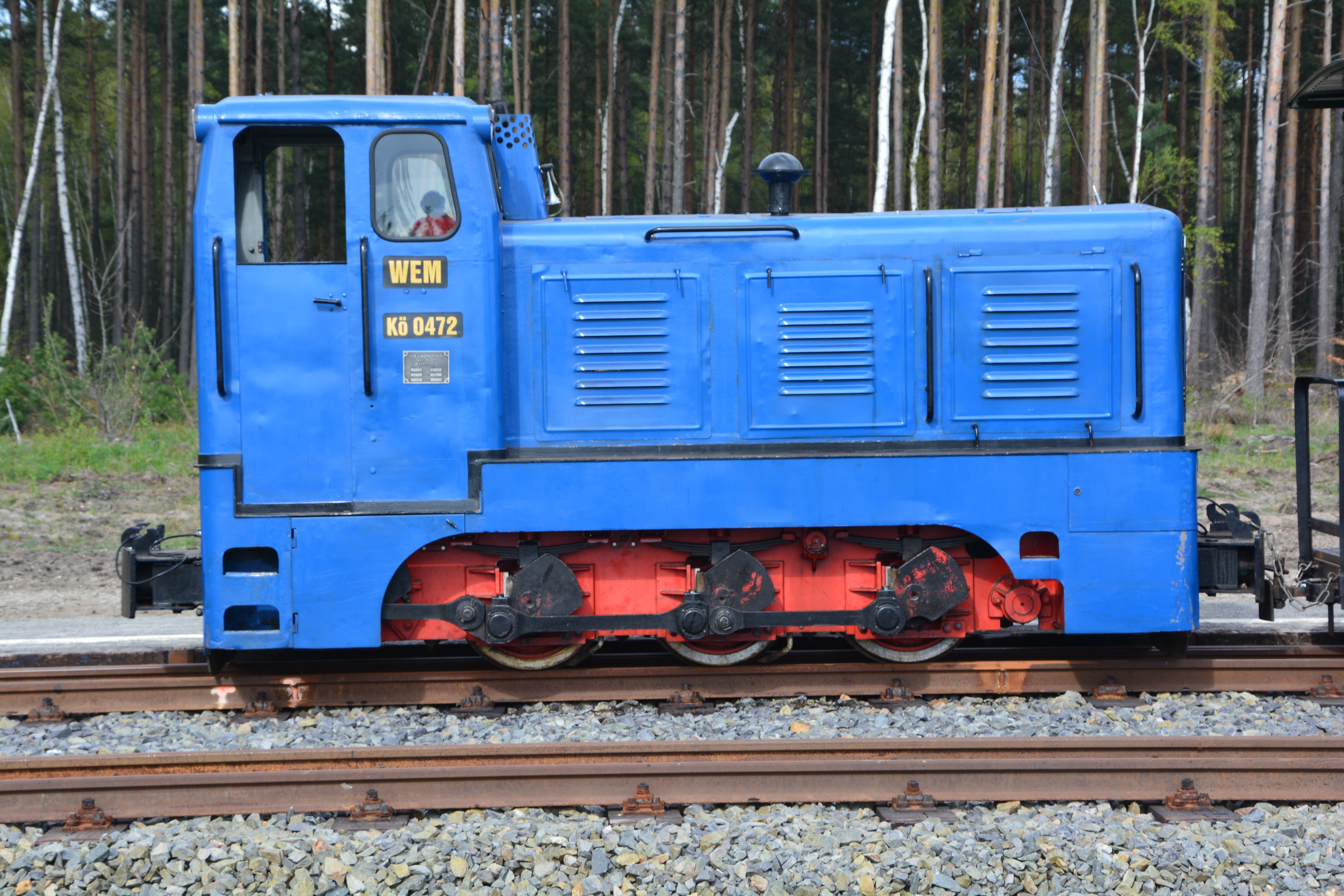
Kö 0472

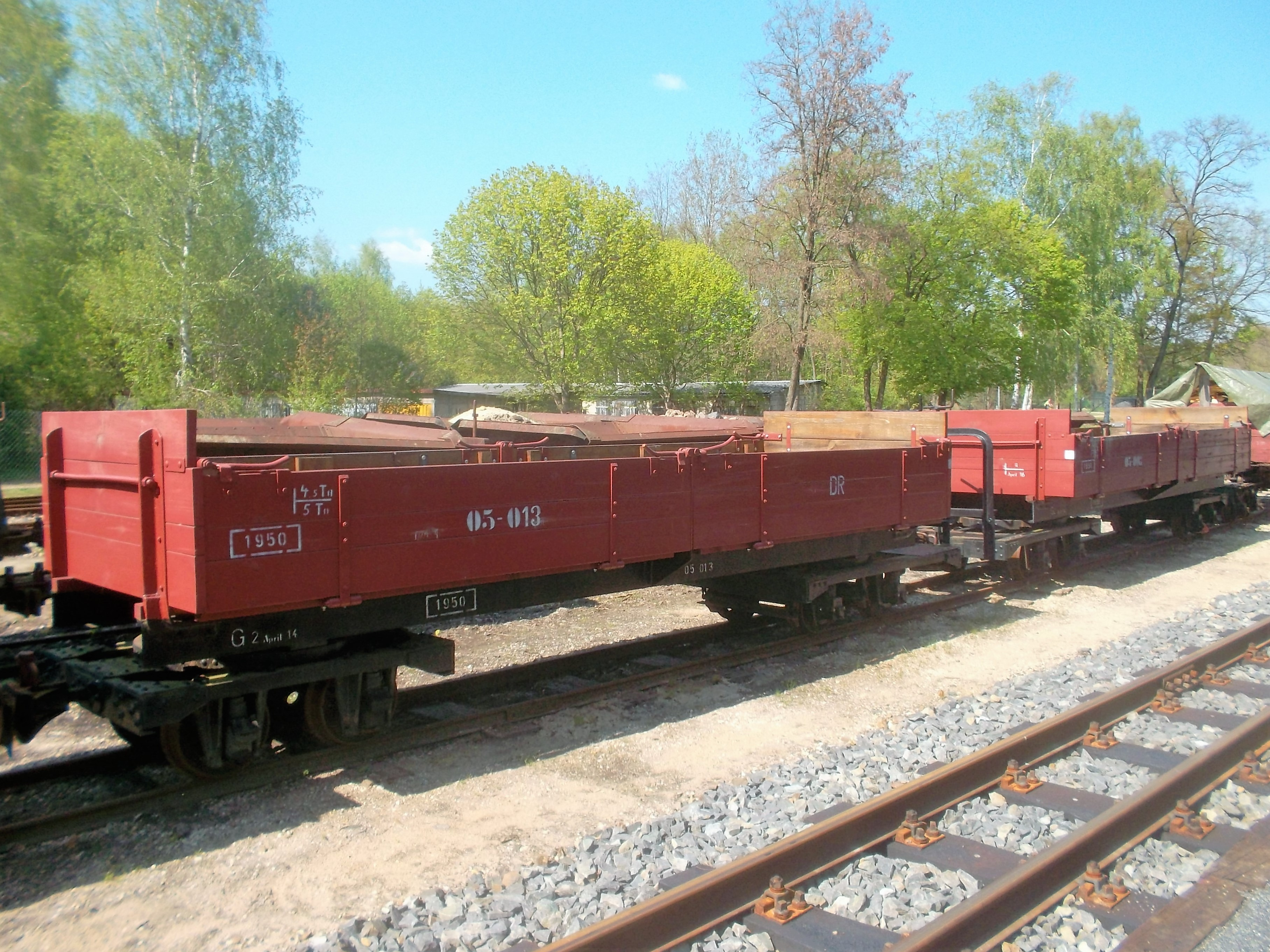
Type 05 freight car for brick transport

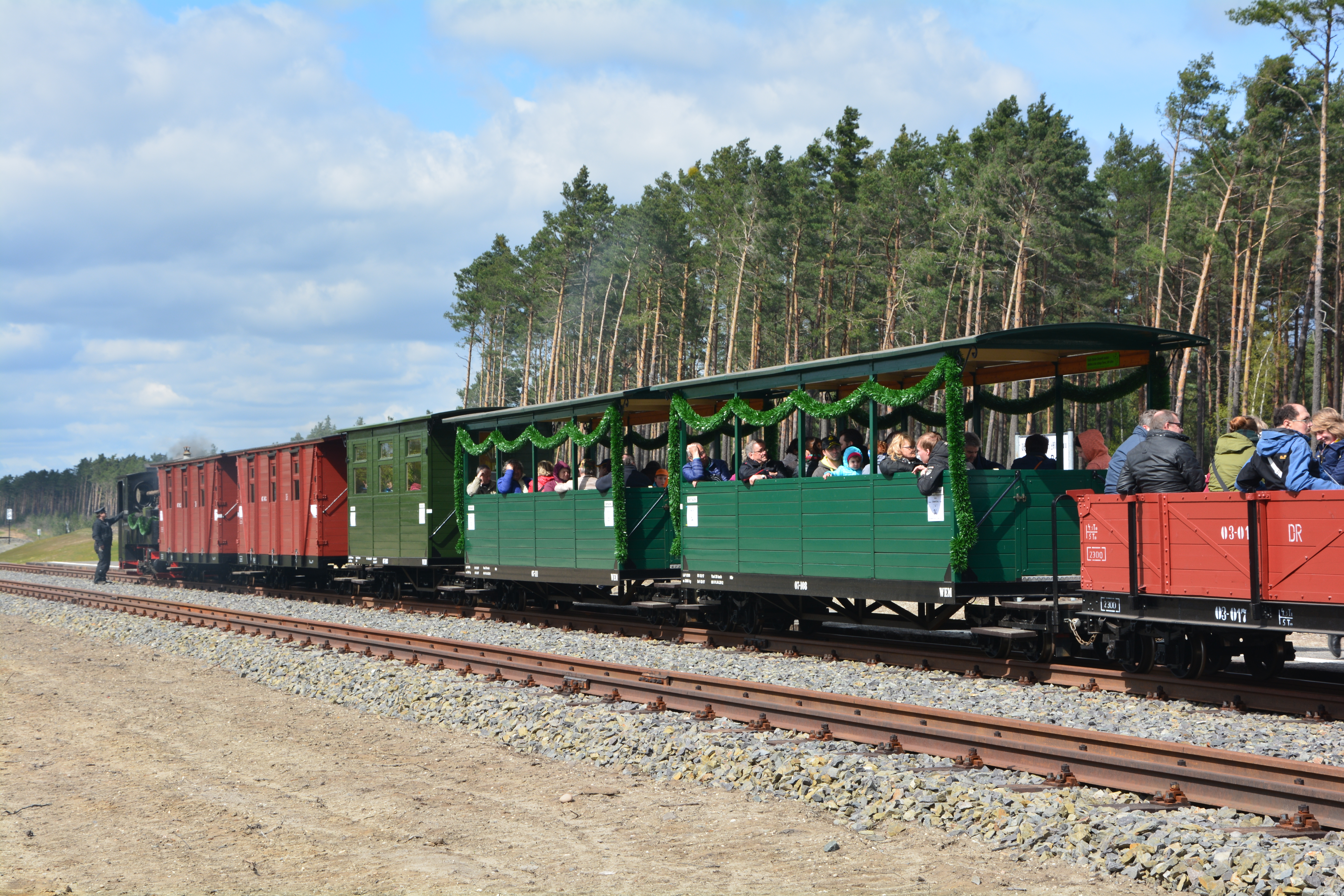
Passenger cars
