= Räderschnitza =

River in Germany

Location
- Country: Germany
- State: Saxony

Physical characteristics
- Mouth
  - location: Lusatian Neisse
  - coordinates: 51.5604°N 14.7123°E

Basin features
- Progression: Lusatian Neisse→ Oder→ Baltic Sea

Räderschnitza (Sorbian Radošnica) is a small river in Saxony, Germany. It flows through Gablenz, and joins the Lusatian Neisse in Bad Muskau.

== See also ==
- List of rivers of Saxony
