= Kromlau =

Coordinates: 51°32′15″N 14°37′47″E

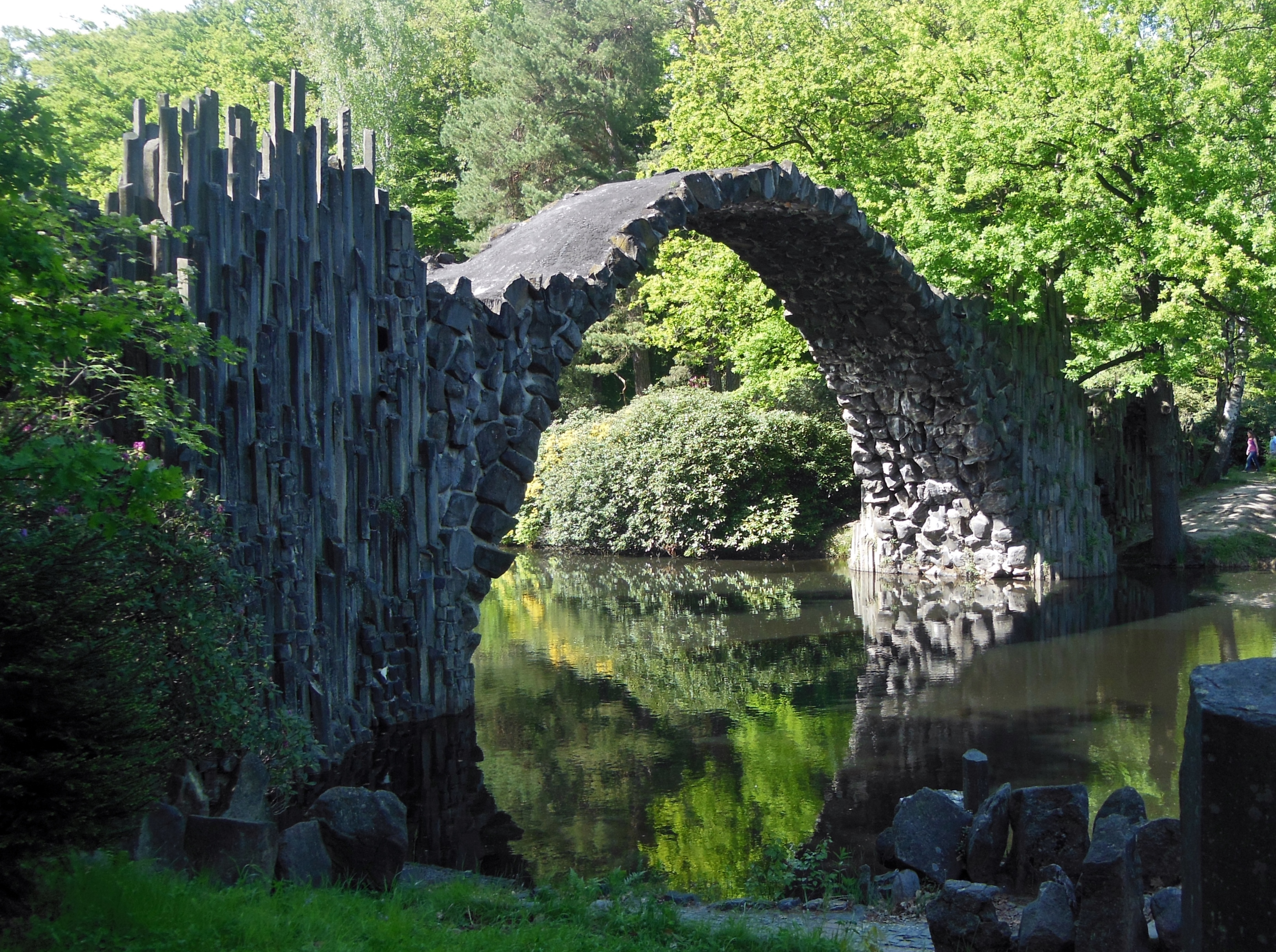
The "Devil's Bridge" in Kromlau

Kromlau (Upper Sorbian: Kromław) is a community of the Saxon municipality of Gablenz in the district of Görlitz, located in the westernmost part of Lower Silesia, Germany. The village is in the Sorbian settlement area of Upper Lusatia and is mainly known for the Azalea and Rhododendron Park Kromlau, the largest rhododendron park in Germany, and its "Devil's Bridge" (Rakotzbrücke).
