= Kromlau Azalea and Rhododendron Park =

Landscaped park in Germany

Coordinates: 51°32′08″N 14°38′10″E

- Azaleen- und Rhododendronpark Kromlau; Acalejowy a Rododendronowy Park Kromola
- Rakotz (Crab's) Bridge
- Interactive map of Kromlau Azalea and Rhododendron Park
- Location: Saxony (Lusatia)
- Nearest town: Weißwasser (Běła Woda)
- Established: 1842
- Designated: landscape park

The Kromlau Azalea and Rhododendron Park (German: Azaleen- und Rhododendronpark Kromlau; Upper Sorbian: Acalejowy a Rododendronowy Park Kromola) is an 80-hectare (200-acre) landscaped park in the village of Kromlau (Upper Sorbian: Kromola), in the municipality of Gablenz (Jabłońc) in the region of Lusatia (Upper Lusatia), in the very east of the German state of Saxony, close to the border with Poland. It was created in the nineteenth century, reportedly on the grounds of a former feudal estate, by Friedrich Herrmann Rötschke. Following World War II, the park was nationalized by the government, and has no admission fee (though there is a nominal parking fee). The park is an example of an English landscape garden, and it contains many small ponds and lakes. Its most well-known element is the Rakotz Bridge, a bridge especially built to create a circle when it is reflected in the water beneath it.

== Rakotz Bridge ==
The Rakotz Bridge (German: Rakotzbrücke; Upper Sorbian: Rakocec Móst), also known as Devil's Bridge (German: Teufelsbrücke; Upper Sorbian: Djabołski Móst), spanning Rakotz Lake, is 7.8 metres (26 ft) long and 6.5 metres (21 ft) wide. The name of both the bridge and the lake derive from the Upper Sorbian expression for crab (rak). The radius of the inner arch is 2.2 metres, and the outer radius is 3.4 metres long. The abutments measure 3.6 metres (12 ft), and the side weights measure 2.0 metres (6 ft 7 in).

The bridge features artificially-formed basalt columns selected and shipped from distant quarries. It was commissioned in 1860 "by the knight of the local town", Friedrich Herrmann Rötschke (1805–1893).

Although the bridge was renovated in 2018 and 2019, it has remained forbidden to cross the bridge, for the safety of both the public and the bridge itself.

== Gallery ==
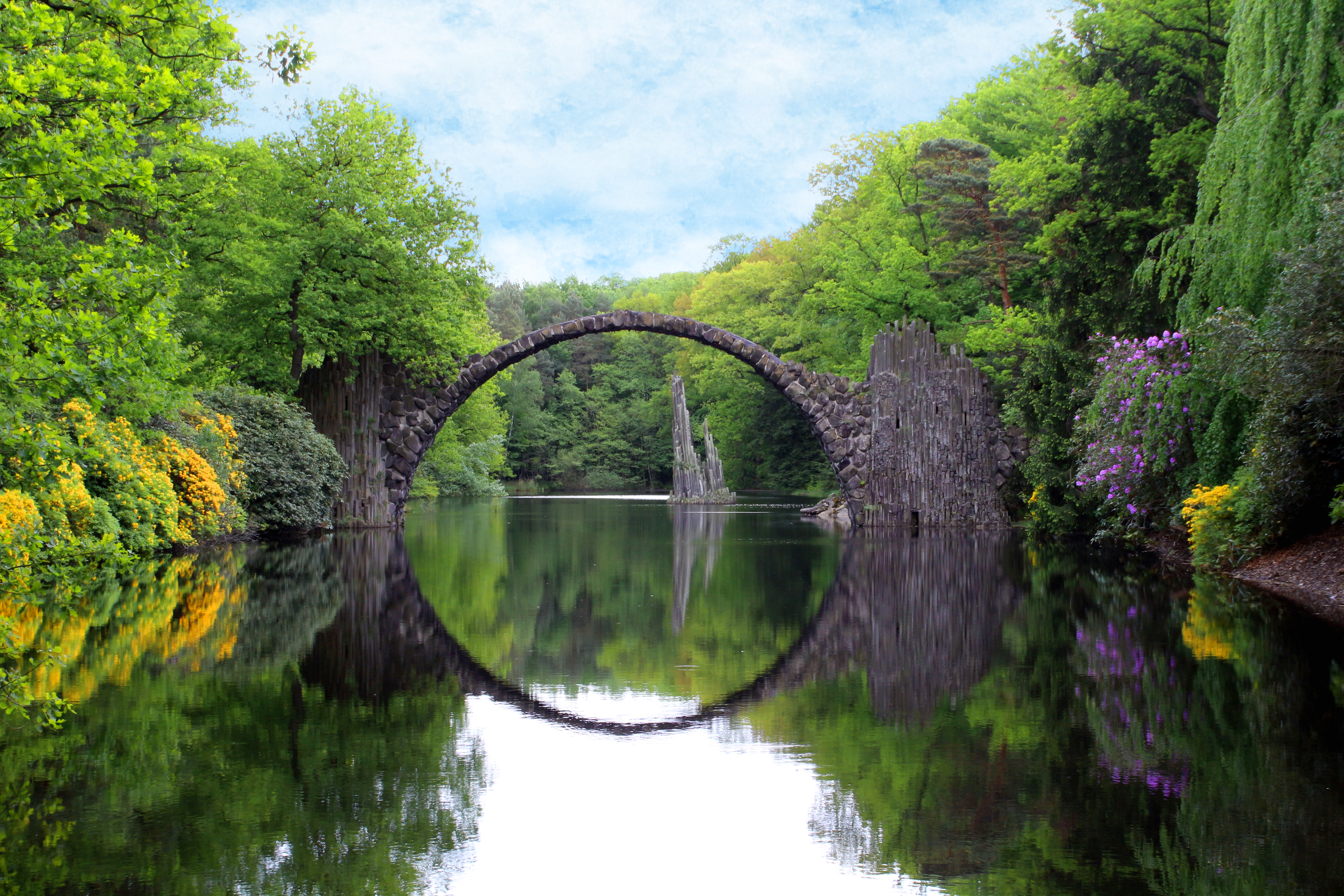

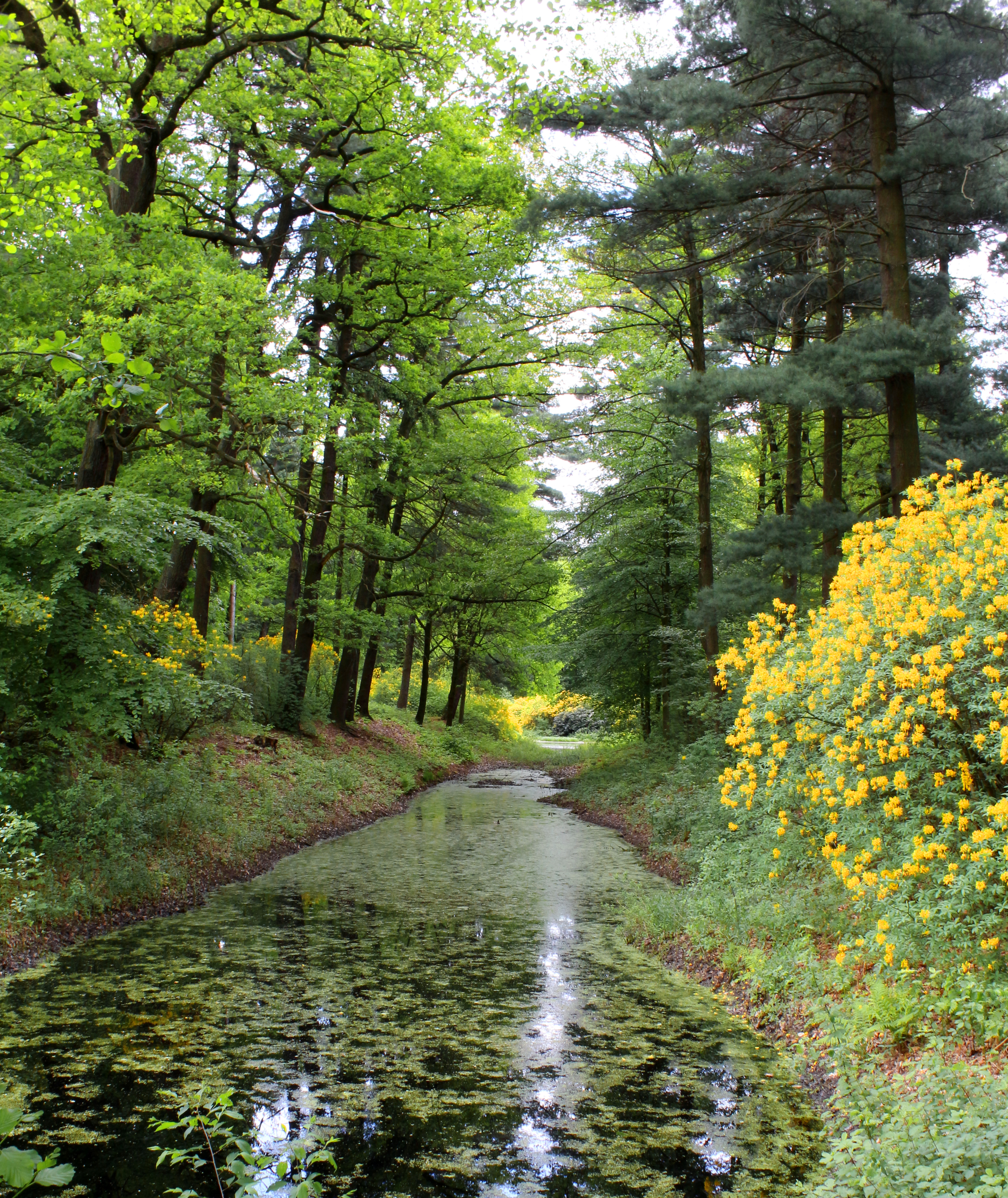

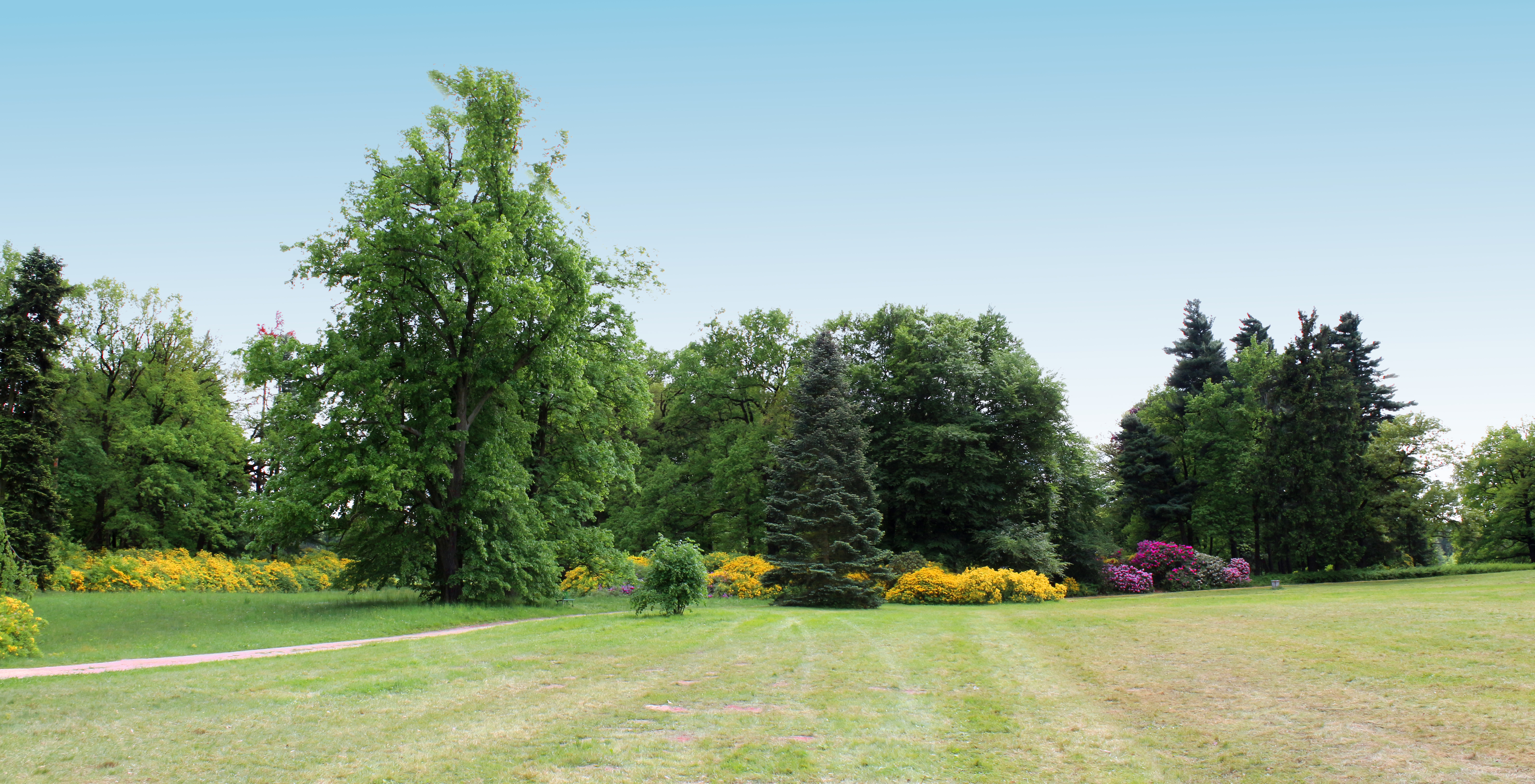

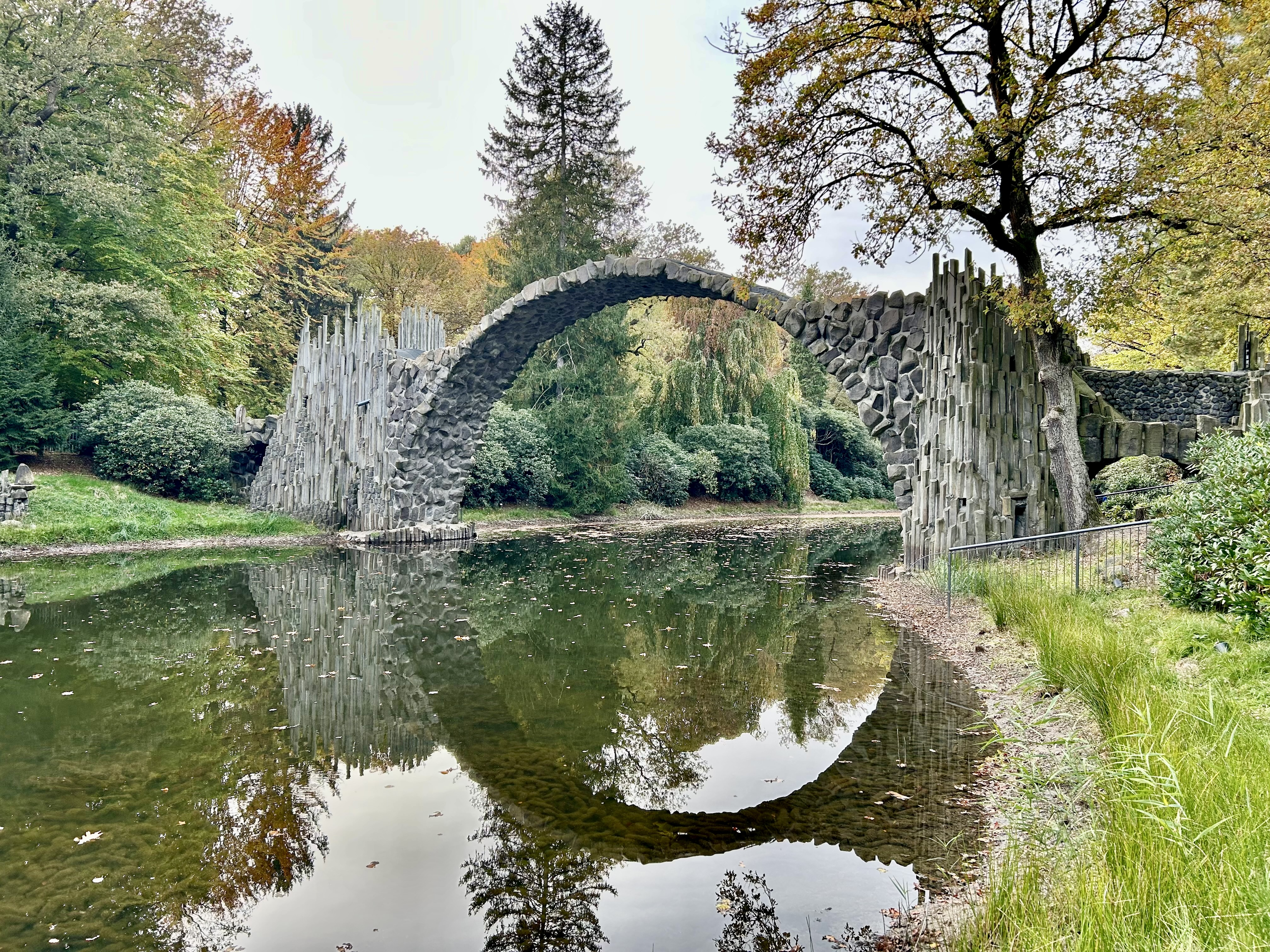
Rakotzbrücke and Rakotzsee

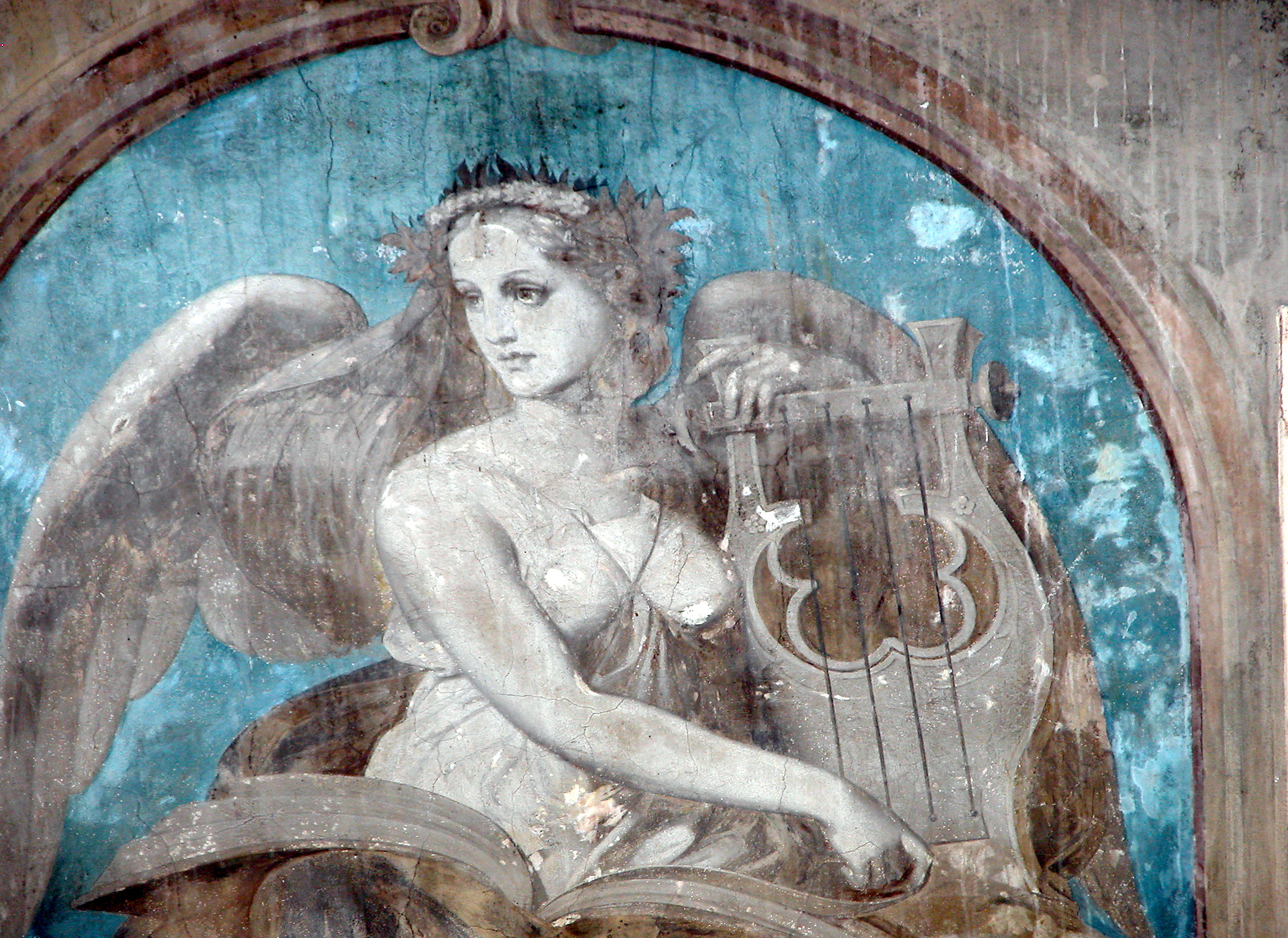

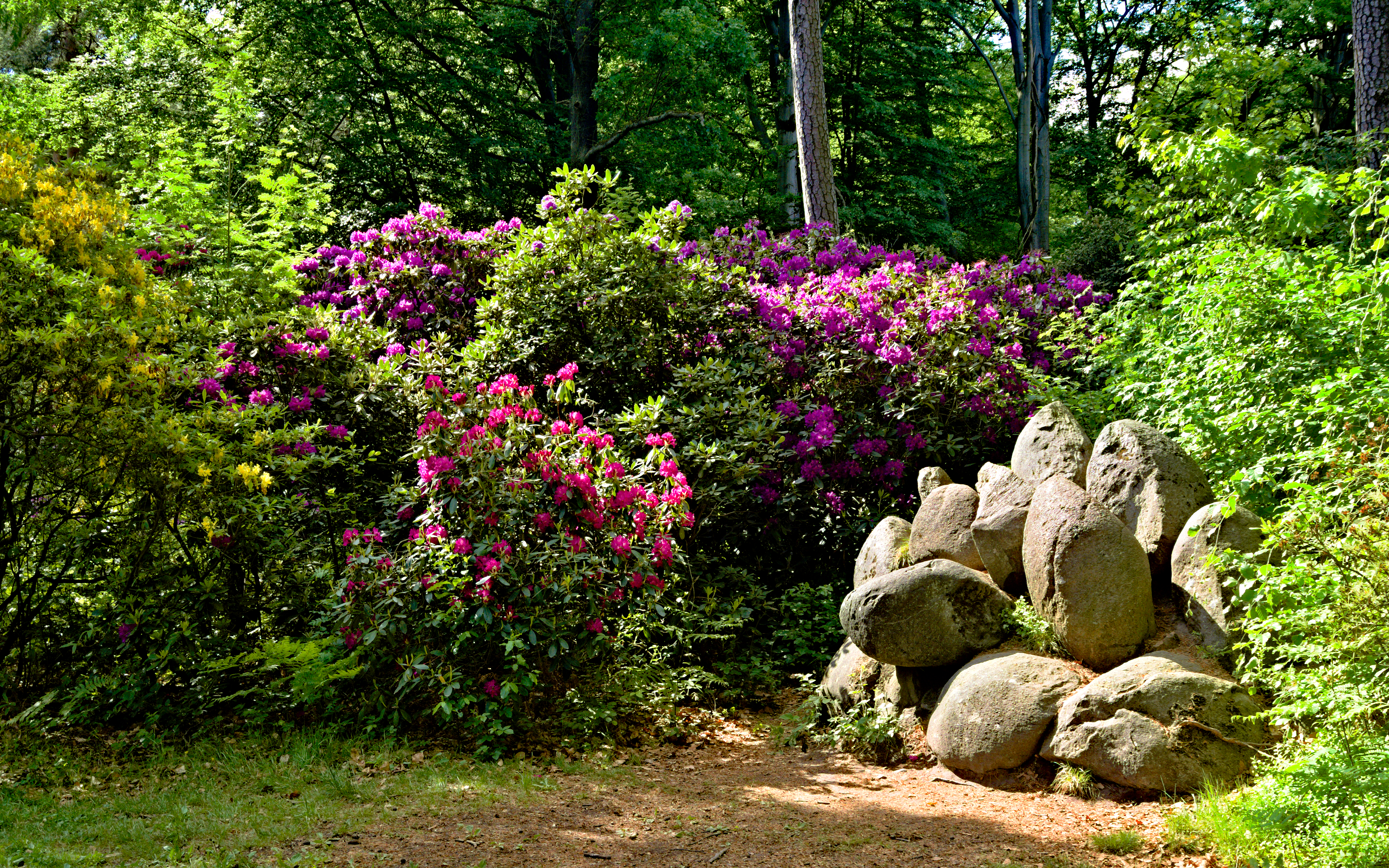

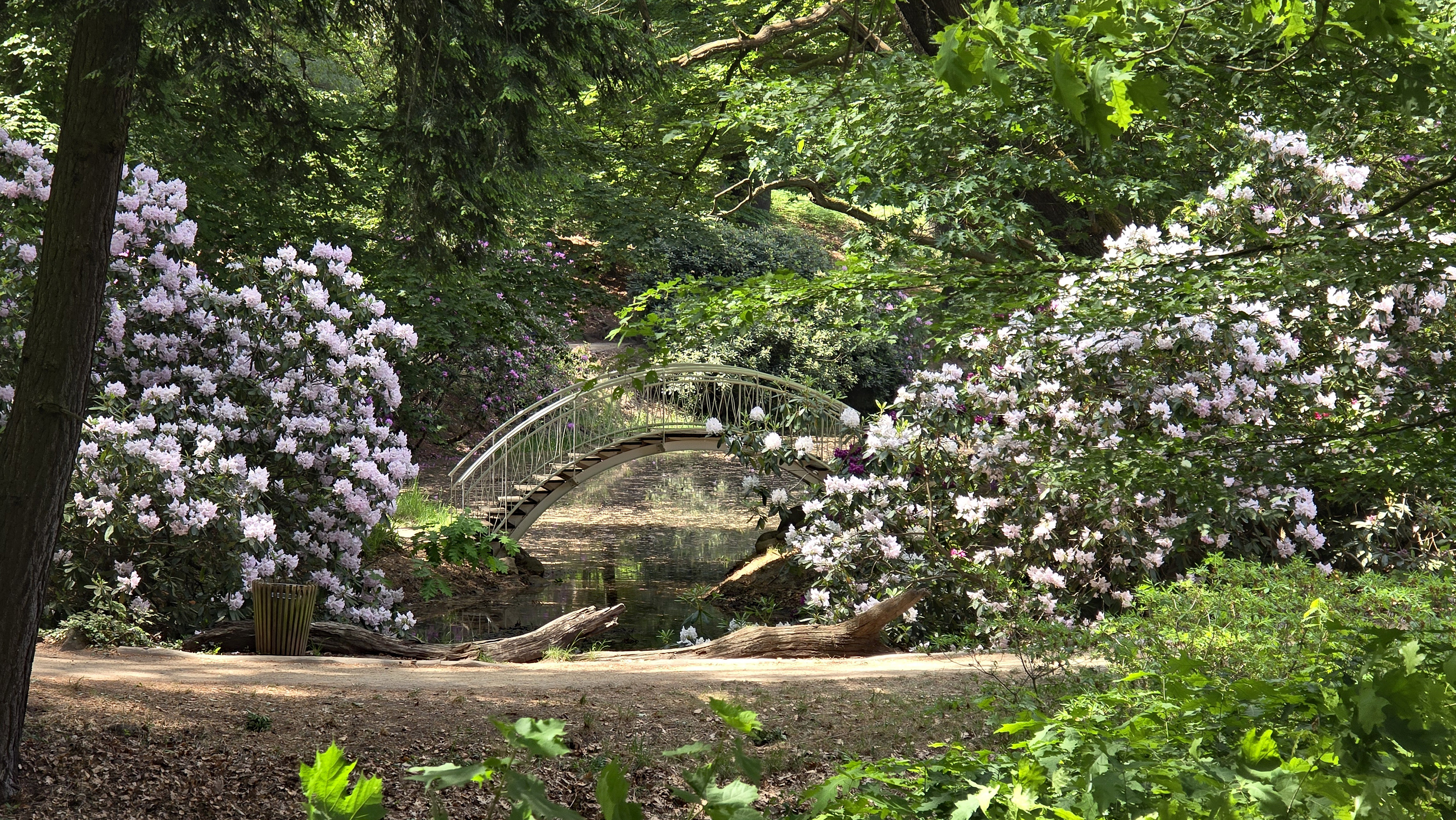

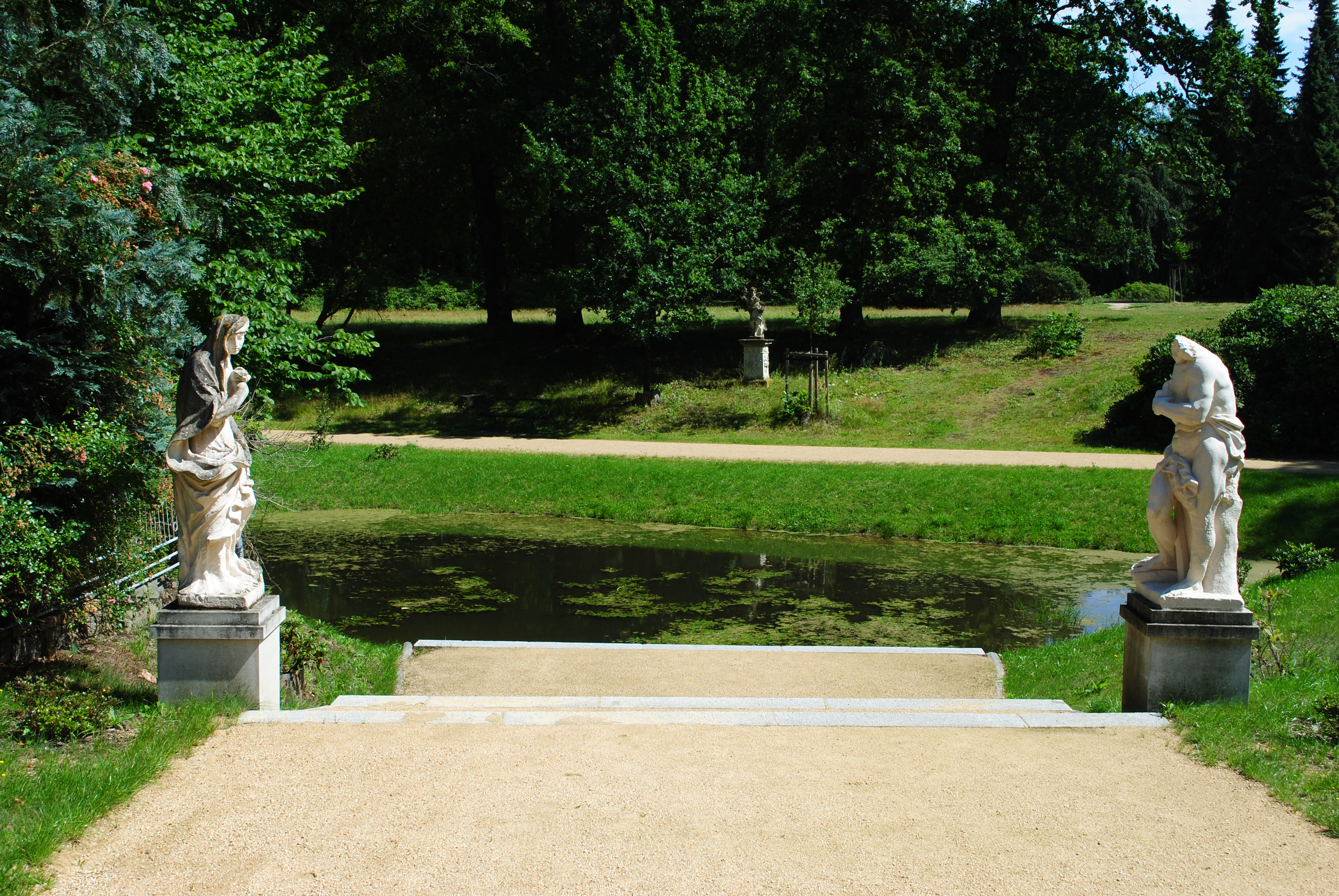

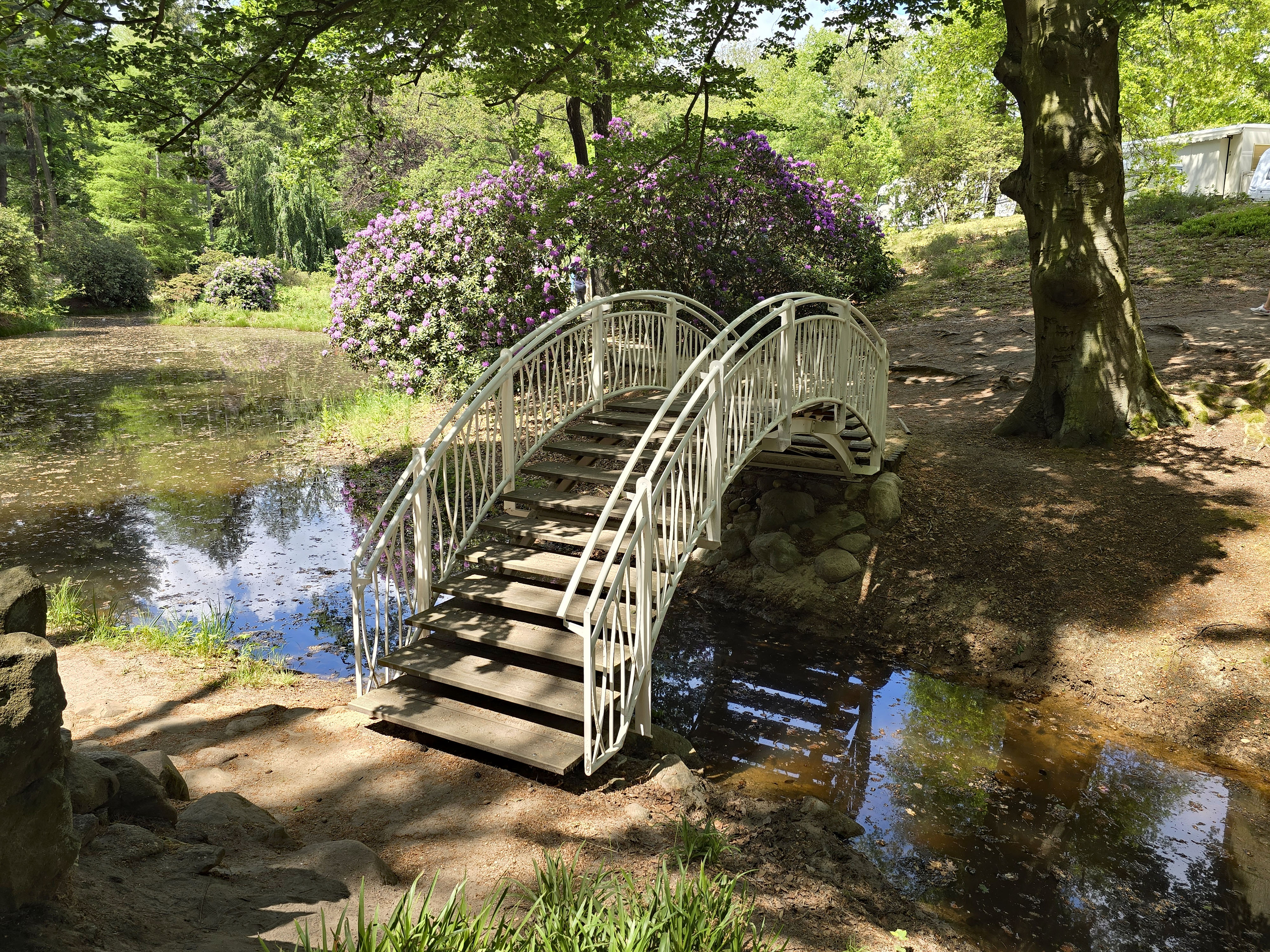

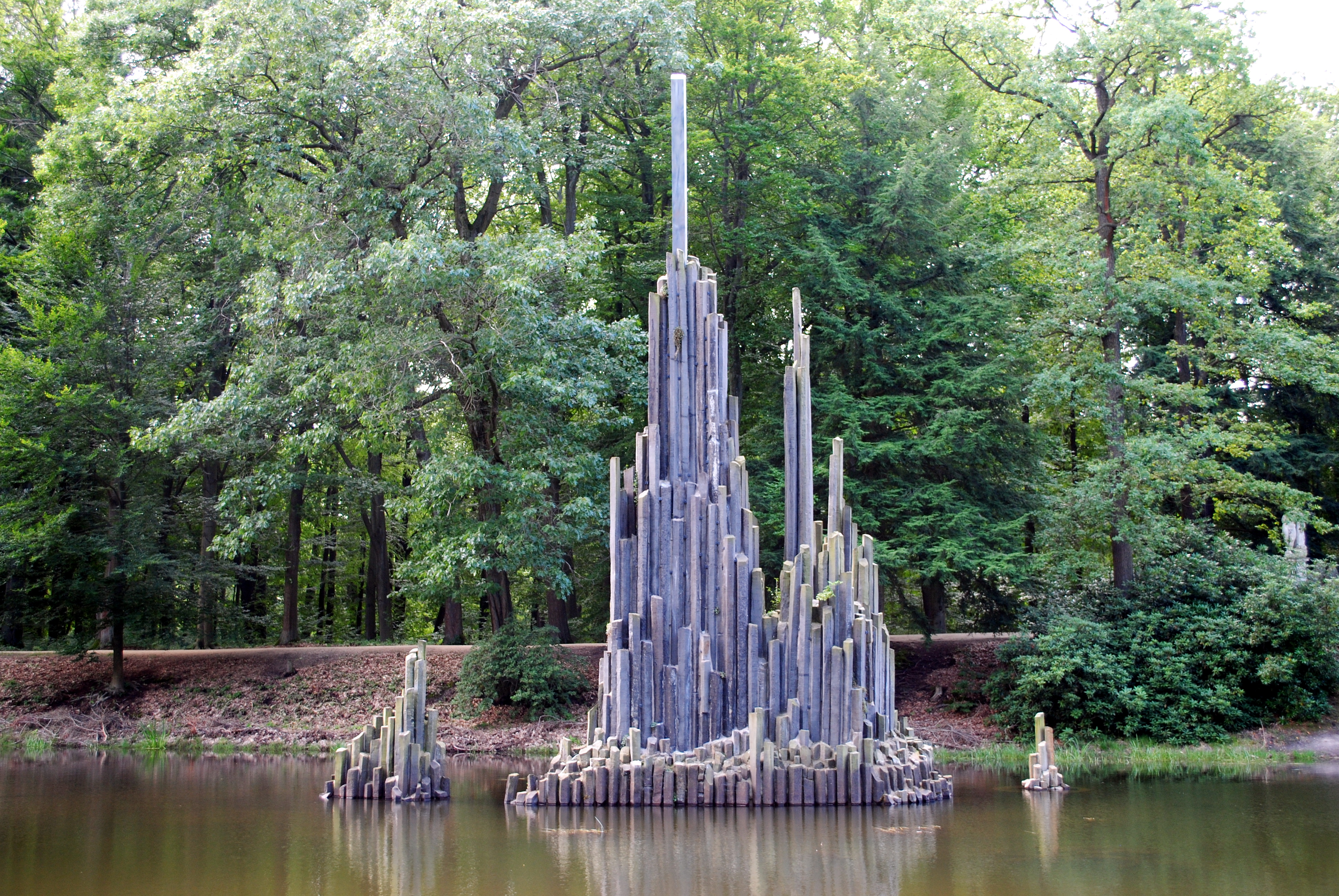

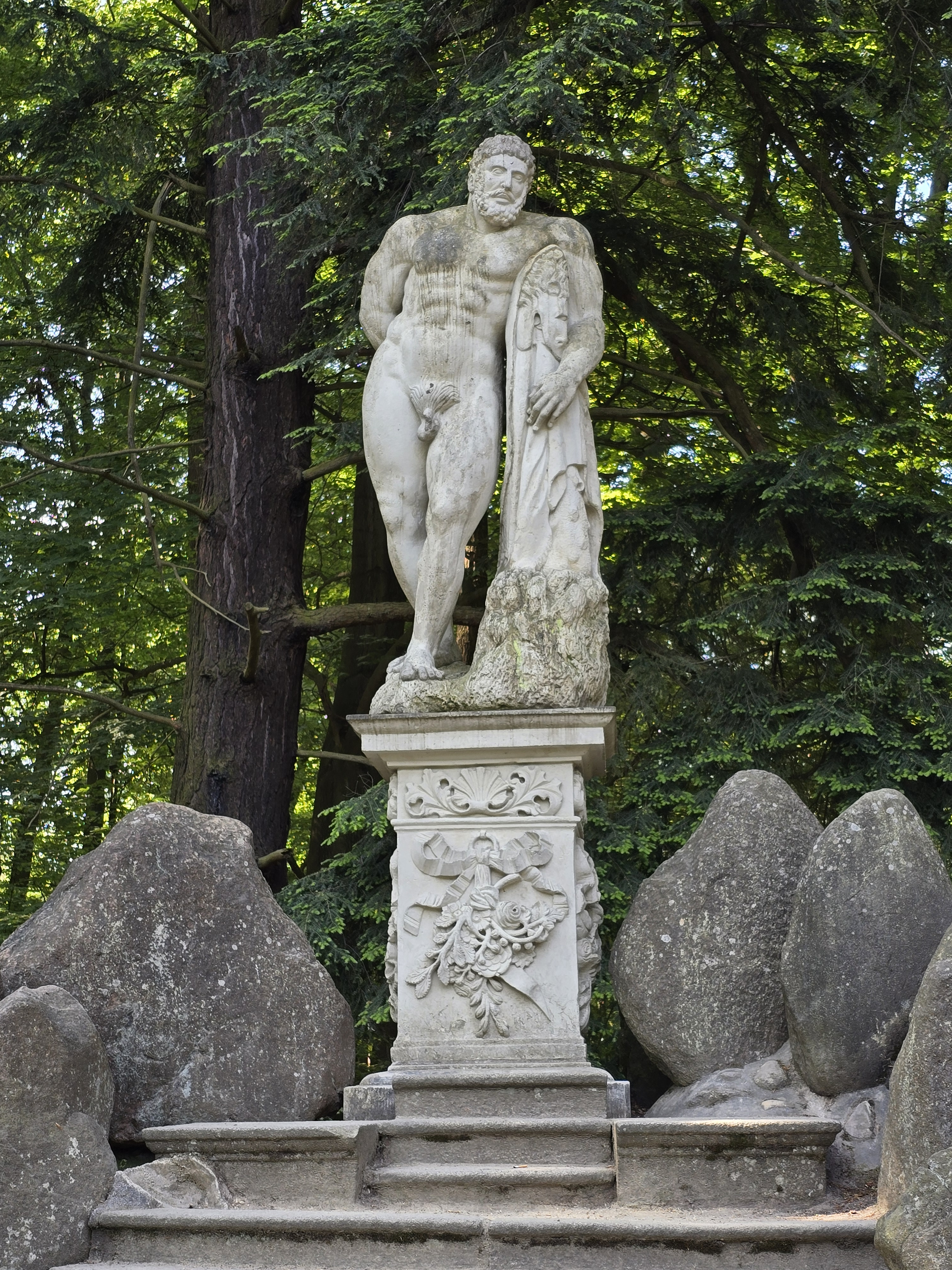

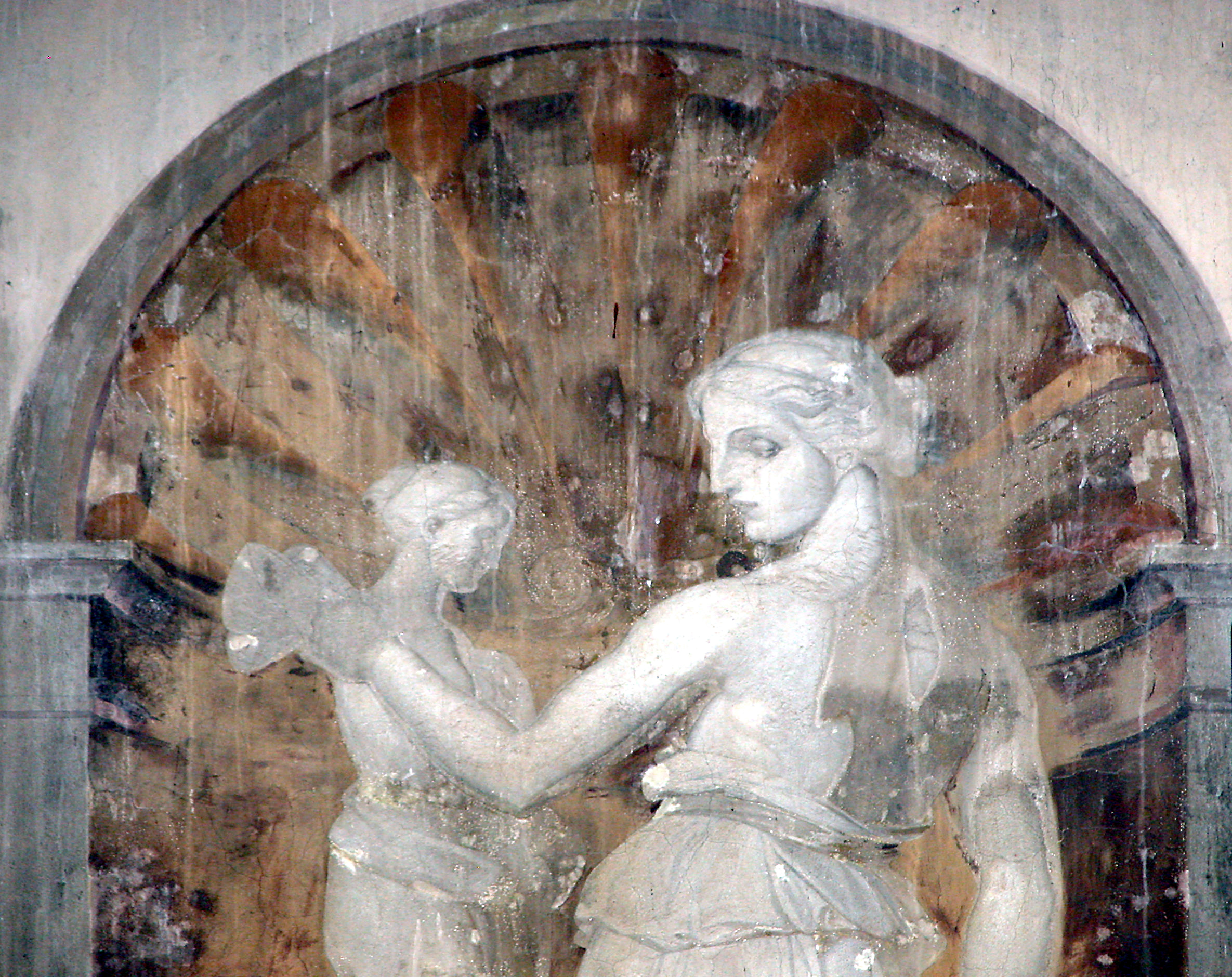

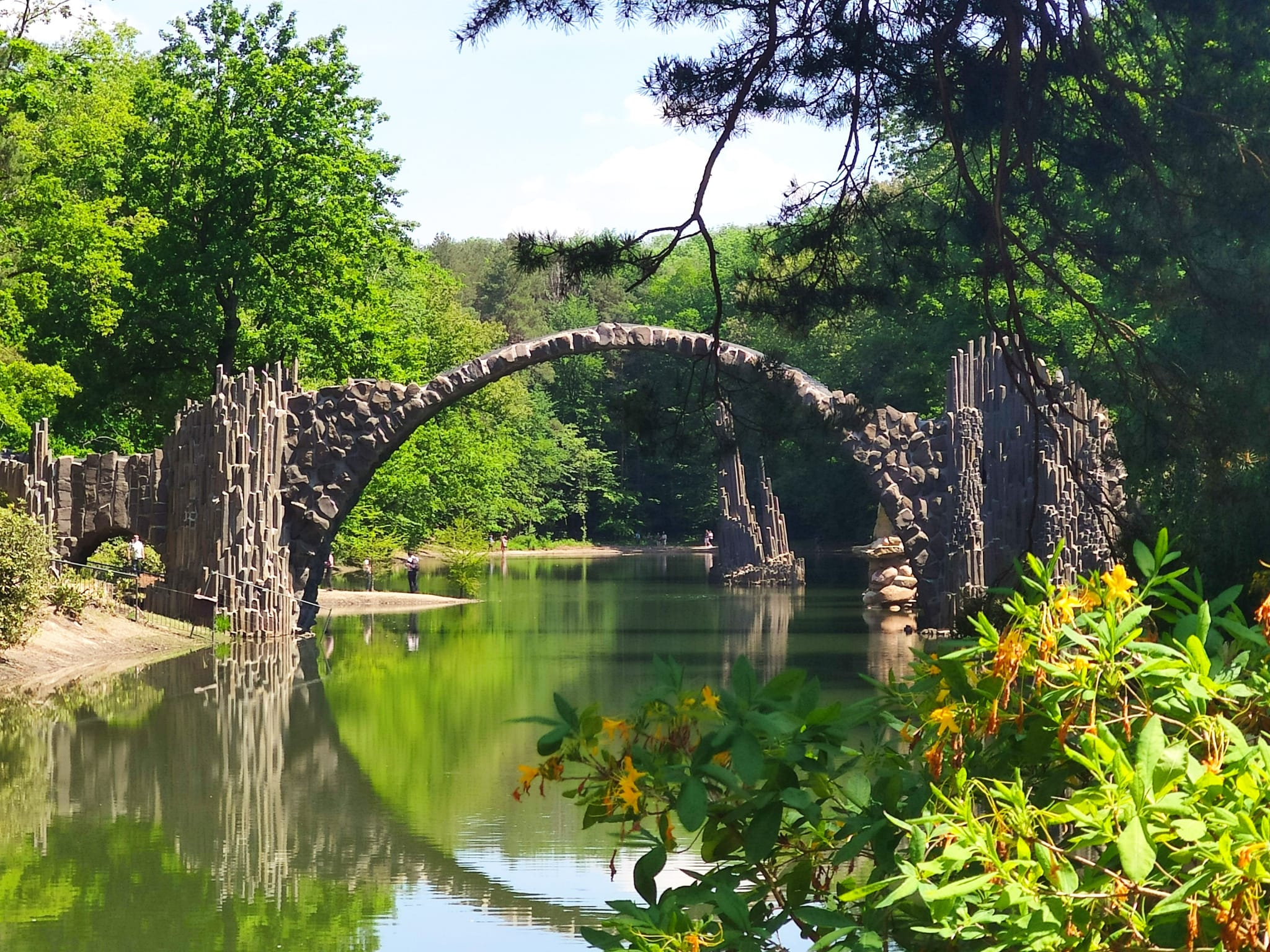

The Rakotz Bridge and apples (Upper Sorbian: jabłučina or jabłoń) in the coat of arms of Gablenz.

District of Görlitz within Germany

District of Görlitz within Saxony

Municipalities of the district of Görlitz

Gablenz within the district of Görlitz.
