= Gablenz, Saxony =

Gablenz Jabłońc Jabłoniec
- Municipality
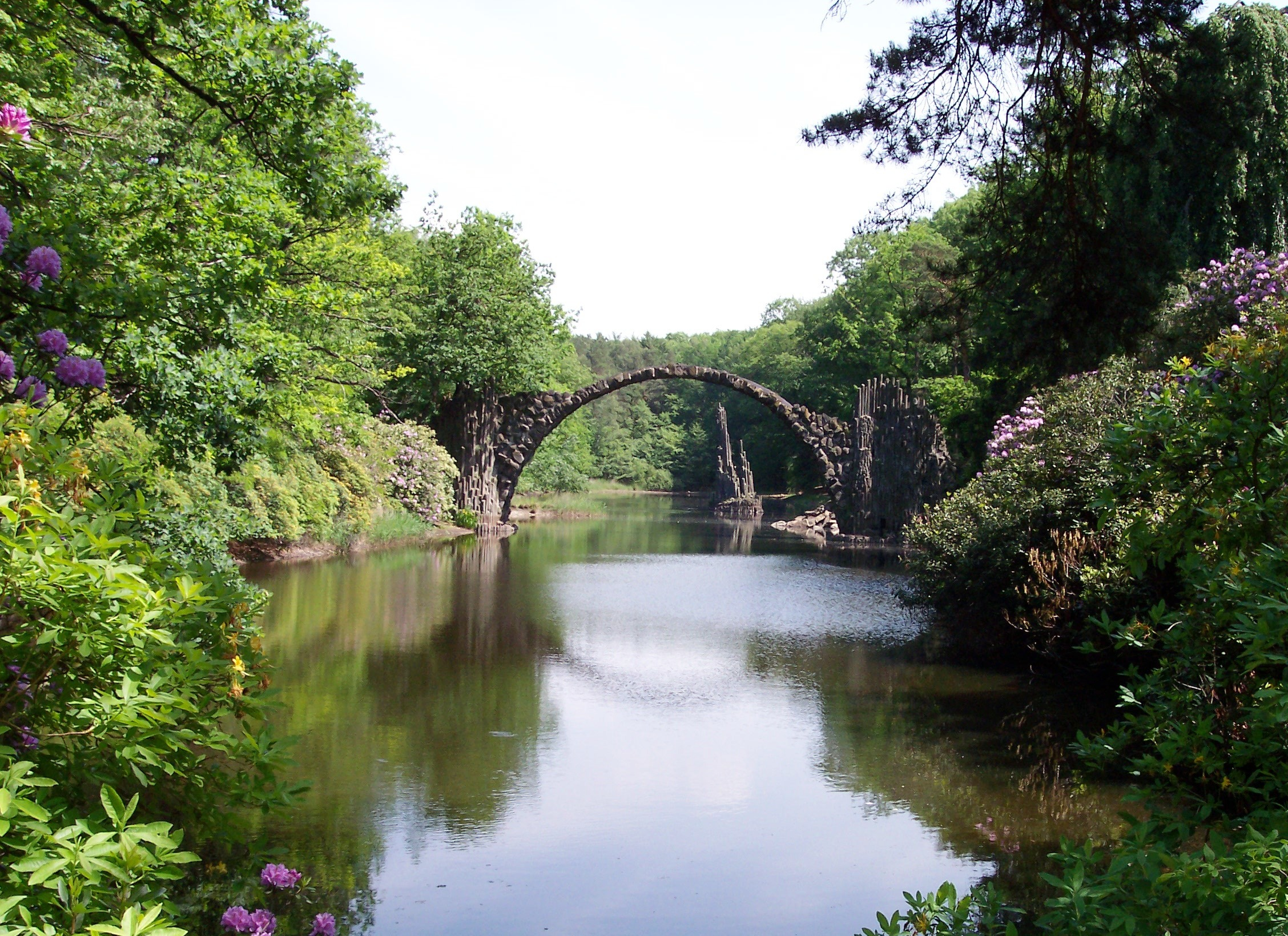
- The Rakotzbrücke at Azalea and Rhododendron Park Kromlau

- Coat of arms

- Location of Gablenz; Jabłońc within Görlitz district
- Interactive map of Gablenz; Jabłońc
- Location within Germany Location within Saxony
- Coordinates: 51°32′8″N 14°39′54″E
- Country: Germany
- State: Saxony
- District: Görlitz
- Subdivisions: 3

Government
  - Mayor (2018–25): Dietmar Noack (CDU)

Area
  - Total: 14.65 km^{2} (5.66 sq mi)
- Elevation: 150 m (490 ft)

Population (2025-12-31)
  - Total: 1,526
  - Density: 104.2/km^{2} (269.8/sq mi)
- Demonym(s): German: Gablenzer; Upper Sorbian: Jabłońcan (m.), Jabłońcanka (f.)
- Time zone: UTC+01:00 (CET)
  - Summer (DST): UTC+02:00 (CEST)
- Postal codes: 02953
- Dialling codes: 03576
- Vehicle registration: GR, LÖB, NOL, NY, WSW, ZI

Gablenz (Upper Sorbian: Jabłońc, pronounced [ˈjabwɔnʲts]; Polish: Jabłoniec) is a municipality in the district of Görlitz, in Saxony, Germany.

The municipality is part of the recognized Sorbian settlement area in Saxony. Upper Sorbian has an official status next to German, all villages bear names in both languages.

== See also ==
- Räderschnitza
