= List of longest arch bridge spans =

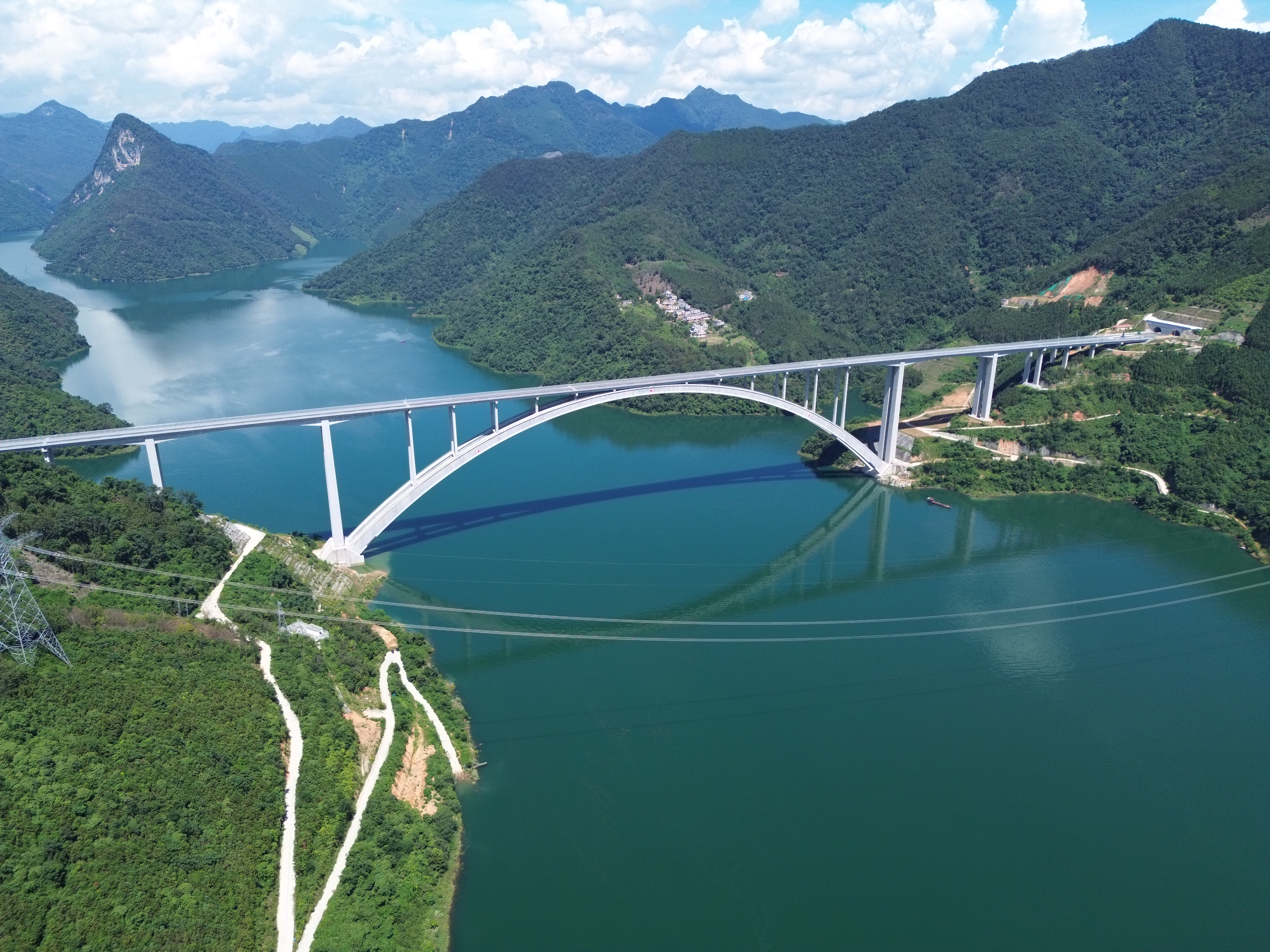
The Tian'e Longtan Bridge.

This list of the longest arch bridge spans ranks the world's arch bridges by the length of their main span. The length of the main span is the most common way to rank bridges as it usually correlates with the engineering complexity involved in designing and constructing the bridge. If one bridge has a longer span than another it does not necessarily mean that the bridge is longer from shore to shore or from abutment to abutment.

Since each bridge has its own specific characteristics, and these are large structures, the very definition of span can vary from one bridge to another. Most use the span at the axis of the arch, as if the structure had a very thin thickness, and the intersection of this axis with the arch's fixed supports, similar to a hinged arch bridge. This definition is called calculated span. Others use the entire arched bridge section, separated from its approach viaducts, which is often the value between the two piers on each side of the arch. This is the case for bridges with multiple spans, large suspension or cable-stayed bridges use this definition of the span at the axis of their towers. Some, however, use the net span or the total external length of the arch.

== Completed bridges ==
Notes: CFST is concrete filled steel tube.

| Name | Span meters | Material | Year opened | Location | Country | Ref |
|---|---|---|---|---|---|---|
| Tian'e Longtan Bridge | 600 m (1,969 ft) | Concrete | 2024 | Tian'e County, Guangxi; 25°04′41″N 107°01′16″E | China | |
| Pingnan Third Bridge | 560 m (1,837 ft) | CFST | 2020 | Pingnan County, Guangxi; 23°32′31″N 110°20′49″E | China | |
| Chaotianmen Bridge | 552 m (1,811 ft) | Steel | 2009 | Chongqing; 29°35′18″N 106°34′39″E | China | |
| Lupu Bridge | 550 m (1,804 ft) | Steel | 2003 | Shanghai; 31°11′29″N 121°28′35″E | China | |
| Bosideng Bridge | 530 m (1,739 ft) | CFST | 2012 | Hejiang County, Sichuan; 28°53′32″N 105°52′47″E | China | |
| Zigui Yangtze River Bridge | 519 m (1,703 ft) | Steel | 2019 | Zigui County, Hubei; 30°57′34″N 110°45′33″E | China | |
| New River Gorge Bridge | 518 m (1,700 ft) | Steel | 1977 | Fayetteville, West Virginia; 38°04′08″N 81°04′57″W | United States | |
| Bayonne Bridge | 510 m (1,675 ft) | Steel | 1931 | Staten Island, New York–Bayonne, New Jersey; 40°38′31″N 74°08′32″W | United States | |
| Hejiang Yangtze River Bridge | 507 m (1,663 ft) | CFST | 2021 | Hejiang County, Sichuan; 28°49′29″N 105°49′53″E | China | |
| Sydney Harbour Bridge | 503 m (1,650 ft) | Steel | 1932 | Sydney; 33°51′08″S 151°12′39″E | Australia | |
| Nu River Bridge | 490 m (1,608 ft) | Steel | 2019 | Longling County–Shidian County, Yunnan; 24°45′02″N 98°56′48″E | China | |
| Deyu Expressway Wu River Bridge | 475 m (1,558 ft) | CFST | 2023 | Fenggang County–Sinan County, Guizhou; 27°39′03″N 107°54′44″E | China | |
| Chenab Bridge | 467 m (1,532 ft) | Steel | 2022 | Reasi, Jammu and Kashmir; 33°09′03″N 74°52′57″E | India | |
| Wushan Yangtze River Bridge | 460 m (1,509 ft) | CFST | 2005 | Wushan, Chongqing; 31°03′49″N 109°54′05″E | China | |
| Guantang Bridge | 457 m (1,499 ft) | Steel | 2018 | Liuzhou, Guangxi; 24°23′05″N 109°29′40″E | China | |
| Mingzhou Bridge | 450 m (1,476 ft) | Steel | 2011 | Ningbo, Zhejiang; 29°54′50″N 121°39′02″E | China | |
| Zhaoqing Bridge | 450 m (1,476 ft) | Steel | 2014 | Zhaoqing, Guangdong; 23°07′19″N 112°24′13″E | China | |
| Daxiaojing Bridge | 450 m (1,476 ft) | CFST | 2019 | Luodian County, Guizhou; 25°32′57″N 106°51′47″E | China | |
| Qinglong Railway Bridge | 445 m (1,460 ft) | Concrete | 2016 | Qinglong County–Guanling County, Guizhou; 25°57′02″N 105°15′18″E | China | |
| Yachi Railway Bridge | 436 m (1,430 ft) | CFST | 2019 | Qianxi County–Qingzhen, Guizhou; 26°53′04″N 106°17′25″E | China | |
| Mingzhu Bay Bridge | 436 m (1,430 ft) | Steel | 2021 | Guangzhou, Guangdong; 22°44′27″N 113°33′21″E | China | |
| Zhijing River Bridge | 430 m (1,411 ft) | CFST | 2009 | Badong County, Hubei; 30°37′36″N 110°11′48″E | China | |
| Zangmu Railway Bridge | 430 m (1,411 ft) | CFST | 2021 | Gyaca County, Tibet; 29°11′43″N 92°30′41″E | China | |
| Xinguang Bridge | 428 m (1,404 ft) | Steel | 2008 | Guangzhou, Guangdong; 23°03′10″N 113°19′18″E | China | |
| Wanzhou Yangtze River Bridge | 420 m (1,378 ft) | Concrete | 1997 | Wanzhou, Chongqing; 30°45′35″N 108°25′11″E | China | |
| Caiyuanba Bridge | 420 m (1,378 ft) | Steel | 2007 | Chongqing; 29°32′35″N 106°32′52″E | China | |
| Qilu Yellow River Bridge | 420 m (1,378 ft) | Steel | 2024 | Jinan, Shandong; 36°44′42″N 116°53′44″E | China | |
| Krk Bridge | 416 m (1,365 ft) | Concrete | 1980 | Krk–Šmrika; 45°14′50″N 14°34′13″E | Croatia | |
| Nanpan River Qiubei Bridge | 416 m (1,365 ft) | Concrete | 2016 | Qiubei County–Mile City, Yunnan; 24°06′43″N 103°35′07″E | China | |
| Dafaqu Bridge | 410 m (1,345 ft) | CFST | 2022 | Bozhou–Huichuan, Guizhou; 27°47′51″N 106°34′0″E | China | |
| Wuhan Hanjiangwan Bridge | 408 m (1,339 ft) | Steel | 2021 | Wuhan, Hubei; 30°35′8″N 114°12′16″E | China | |
| Qingshuitang Bridge | 408 m (1,339 ft) | Steel | 2023 | Zhuzhou, Hunan; 27°51′22″N 113°04′29″E | China | |
| Shuangbao Grand Bridge | 405 m (1,329 ft) ×2 | CFST | 2024 | Wulong, Chongqing; 29°17′42″N 107°28′26″E | China | |
| Liancheng Bridge | 400 m (1,312 ft) | CFST | 2007 | Xiangtan, Hunan; 27°53′24″N 112°57′27″E | China | (Note: For aesthetic reasons, the Liancheng Bridge is a cable-stayed arch bridge which is mainly supported by the arch structure and supplemented by the cable stays.) |
| Daning River Bridge | 400 m (1,312 ft) | Steel | 2010 | Wushan County, Chongqing; 31°06′51″N 109°53′19″E | China | |
| Second Hengqin Bridge | 400 m (1,312 ft) | Steel | 2015 | Zhuhai, Guangdong; 22°09′21″N 113°27′32″E | China | |
| Qianwei Minjiang Grand Bridge | 400 m (1,312 ft) | CFST | 2020 | Qianwei, Sichuan; 29°8′29″N 103°59′25″E | China | |
| Changtai Yangtze River Tianxingzhou Bridge | 388 m (1,273 ft) | Steel | 2025 | Changzhou–Taizhou, Jiangsu; 31°59′47″N 119°57′13″E | China | |
| Changtai Yangtze River Lu'anzhou Bridge | 388 m (1,273 ft) | Steel | 2025 | Changzhou–Taizhou, Jiangsu; 32°1′8″N 119°58′49″E | China | |
| Almonte River Railway Viaduct | 384 m (1,260 ft) | Concrete | 2016 | Cáceres, Extremadura; 39°41′11″N 6°27′39″W | Spain | |
| Fremont Bridge (Portland) | 382 m (1,253 ft) | Steel | 1973 | Portland, Oregon; 45°32′17″N 122°40′59″W | United States | |
| Hiroshima Airport Bridge | 380 m (1,247 ft) | Steel | 2010 | Hiroshima; 34°27′26″N 132°55′34″E | Japan | |
| Bugrinsky Bridge | 380 m (1,247 ft) | Steel | 2014 | Novosibirsk, Novosibirsk Oblast; 54°58′30″N 82°57′45″E | Russia | |
| Yelanghe Bridge | 370 m (1,214 ft) | Concrete | 2018 | Tongzi County, Guizhou; 28°24′24″N 106°49′14″E | China | |
| Maocaojie Bridge | 368 m (1,207 ft) | CFST | 2006 | Maocaojie, Hunan; 29°3′43″N 112°18′7″E | China | |
| Port Mann Bridge (1964) dismantled in 2015 | 366 m (1,201 ft) | Steel | 1964 | Surrey, British Columbia; 49°13′05″N 122°48′41″W | Canada | |
| Zhaohua Jialing River Bridge | 364 m (1,194 ft) | Concrete | 2012 | Guangyuan, Sichuan; 32°18′4″N 105°43′56″E | China | |
| Žďákov Bridge | 362 m (1,188 ft) | Steel | 1967 | Orlík nad Vltavou, South Bohemian Region; 49°30′16″N 14°11′01″E | Czech Republic | |
| Nansha Harbor Hongqili Railway Bridge | 360 m (1,181 ft) ×2 | Steel | 2021 | Guangzhou–Zhongshan, Guangdong; 22°43′30″N 113°27′11″E | China | |
| Yajisha Bridge | 360 m (1,181 ft) | CFST | 2000 | Guangzhou, Guangdong; 23°03′36″N 113°16′07″E | China | |
| Wanzhou Railway Bridge | 360 m (1,181 ft) | Steel | 2005 | Wanzhou, Chongqing; 30°46′12″N 108°25′00″E | China | |
| Zongxihe Bridge | 360 m (1,181 ft) | CFST | 2015 | Nayong County, Guizhou; 27°01′23″N 105°14′30″E | China | |
| Zhunshuo Railway Yellow River Bridge | 360 m (1,181 ft) | CFST | 2018 | Jungar Banner, Inner Mongolia–Hequ County, Shanxi; 39°26′21″N 111°21′18″E | China | |
| Shawei Zuojiang Bridge | 360 m (1,181 ft) | CFST | 2021 | Fusui County, Guangxi; 22°45′50″N 107°59′21″E | China | |
| Xinwei Hongshuihe Bridge | 354 m (1,161 ft) | CFST | 2024 | Xincheng County, Guangxi; 23°51′42″N 108°41′31″E | China | |
| Najiehe Railway Bridge | 352 m (1,155 ft) | Steel | 2016 | Zhijin County–Qingzhen, Guizhou; 26°42′06″N 106°09′46″E | China | |
| Lexi Expressway Suba Bridge | 350 m (1,148 ft) | Concrete | 2026 | Mabian County, Sichuan; 28°44′36″N 103°31′37″E | China | |
| Shintenmon Bridge | 348 m (1,142 ft) | Steel | 2018 | Uki, Kumamoto; 32°36′43″N 130°27′33″E | Japan | |
| Bridge of the Americas | 344 m (1,129 ft) | Steel | 1962 | Balboa, Panamá Province; 8°56′35″N 79°33′54″W | Panama | |
| Podilskyi Bridge | 344 m (1,129 ft) | Steel | 2023 | Kyiv; 50°28′22″N 30°32′06″E | Ukraine | |
| Lancang River Railway Bridge | 342 m (1,122 ft) | Concrete | 2022 | Yongping County–Longyang, Yunnan; 25°17′23″N 99°20′57″E | China | |
| Meixihe Railway Bridge | 340 m (1,115 ft) | Concrete | 2022 | Fengjie County, Chongqing; 31°3′38″N 109°31′8″E | China | |
| Baishuihe Bridge | 340 m (1,115 ft) | CFST | 2024 | Zhijin County, Guizhou; 26°33′39″N 105°26′7″E | China | |
| Yonghe Bridge | 338 m (1,109 ft) | CFST | 2005 | Nanning, Guangxi; 22°48′13″N 108°17′31″E | China | |
| Xiaohe River Bridge | 338 m (1,109 ft) | CFST | 2010 | Enshi City, Hubei; 30°11′39″N 109°13′35″E | China | |
| Taiping Lake Bridge | 336 m (1,102 ft) | CFST | 2007 | Huangshan City–Chizhou, Anhui; 30°19′49″N 117°57′04″E | China | |
| Dashengguan Yangtze River Bridge | 336 m (1,102 ft) ×2 | Steel | 2009 | Nanjing, Jiangsu; 31°57′36″N 118°37′51″E | China | |
| Meishan Chunxiao Bridge | 336 m (1,102 ft) | Steel | 2017 | Ningbo, Zhejiang; 29°46′03″N 121°55′34″E | China | |
| Matan Hongshuihe Bridge | 336 m (1,102 ft) | CFST | 2018 | Laibin, Guangxi; 23°42′18″N 109°14′45″E | China | |
| Yibin Jinsha River Rail Road Bridge | 336 m (1,102 ft) | Steel | 2019 | Yibin, Sichuan; 28°44′10″N 104°35′4″E | China | |
| Tianshenggang Channel Bridge | 336 m (1,102 ft) | Steel | 2020 | Nantong–Suzhou, Jiangsu; 32°2′19″N 120°42′51″E | China | |
| Dujiangyan Qingcheng Bridge | 336 m (1,102 ft) | Steel | 2025 | Dujiangyan City, Sichuan; 30°58′47″N 103°36′39″E | China | |
| Laviolette Bridge | 335 m (1,099 ft) | Steel | 1967 | Trois-Rivières–Bécancour, Quebec; 46°18′26″N 72°33′42″W | Canada | |
| Shuiluohe Bridge | 335 m (1,099 ft) | Concrete | 2024 | Gulin County, Sichuan; 27°59′56″N 105°55′33″E | China | |
| Silver Jubilee Bridge | 330 m (1,083 ft) | Steel | 1961 | Runcorn–Widnes, Cheshire; 53°20′45″N 2°44′17″W | United Kingdom | |
| Jiangjiehe Bridge | 330 m (1,083 ft) | Concrete | 1995 | Weng'an County, Guizhou; 27°17′56″N 107°22′18″E | China | |
| Dongxihe Bridge | 330 m (1,083 ft) | CFST | 2023 | Wuxi County, Chongqing; 31°39′55″N 109°35′10″E | China | |
| Baishuijiang Bridge | 330 m (1,083 ft) | CFST | 2023 | Yiliang County, Yunnan; 27°48′14″N 104°31′27″E | China | |
| Birchenough Bridge | 329 m (1,080 ft) | Steel | 1935 | Chipinge, Manicaland Province; 19°57′43″S 32°20′39″E | Zimbabwe | |
| Theodore Roosevelt Lake Bridge | 329 m (1,079 ft) | Steel | 1992 | Gila County–Maricopa County, Arizona; 33°40′27″N 111°09′27″W | United States | |
| Tajo Railway Viaduct | 324 m (1,063 ft) | Concrete | 2019 | Cáceres, Extremadura; 39°42′59″N 6°26′35″W | Spain | |
| Mike O'Callaghan–Pat Tillman Memorial Bridge | 323 m (1,060 ft) | Concrete | 2010 | Boulder City, Nevada–Mohave County, Arizona; 36°00′45″N 114°44′29″W | United States | |
| Guansheng Qujiang Bridge | 320 m (1,050 ft) | Concrete | 2018 | Guang'an, Sichuan; 30°27′43″N 106°40′35″E | China | |
| Lanhai Expressway Qinjiang Bridge | 318 m (1,043 ft) | CFST | 2025 | Qinzhou, Guangxi; 21°54′14″N 108°36′26″E | China | |
| Zhenglong Hongshuihe Bridge | 316 m (1,037 ft) | CFST | 2024 | Laibin, Guangxi; 23°44′10″N 109°24′23″E | China | |
| Glen Canyon Dam Bridge | 313 m (1,027 ft) | Steel | 1959 | Page, Arizona; 36°56′08″N 111°29′00″W | United States | |
| Yongjiang Bridge | 312 m (1,024 ft) | Concrete | 1996 | Yongning District, Guangxi; 22°45′52″N 108°29′07″E | China | |
| Hell Gate Bridge | 310 m (1,017 ft) | Steel | 1917 | New York City; 40°46′57″N 73°55′19″W | United States | |
| Liming Lancang River Bridge | 310 m (1,017 ft) | Steel | 2022 | Jinghong, Yunnan; 21°59′57″N 100°49′56″E | China | |
| Loushuihe Bridge | 310 m (1,017 ft) | Steel | 2024 | Hefeng County, Hubei; 29°52′20″N 110°01′34″E | China | |
| Chunan Nanpu Bridge | 308 m (1,010 ft) | CFST | 2003 | Chun'an County, Zhejiang; 29°40′04″N 118°49′28″E | China | |
| Pentele Bridge (Hungary) | 308 m (1,010 ft) | Steel | 2007 | Dunaújváros, Fejér County; 46°54′12″N 18°57′30″E | Hungary | |
| Fenghuang Third Bridge | 308 m (1,010 ft) | Steel | 2017 | Nansha District, Guangdong; 22°44′44″N 113°30′40″E | China | |
| Lewiston–Queenston Bridge | 305 m (1,001 ft) | Steel | 1962 | Lewiston, New York–Queenston, Ontario; 43°09′11″N 79°02′40″W | United States; Canada | |
| Gladesville Bridge | 305 m (1,001 ft) | Concrete | 1964 | Sydney; 33°50′32″S 151°08′53″E | Australia | |
| Van Brienenoord Bridge (westbound) | 305 m (1,001 ft) | Steel | 1990 | Rotterdam; 51°54′12″N 4°32′36″E | Netherlands | |
| Shin Kizugawa Bridge | 305 m (1,001 ft) | Steel | 1994 | Osaka, Osaka Prefecture; 34°37′33″N 135°27′46″E | Japan | |
| Perrine Bridge | 303 m (994 ft) | Steel | 1974 | Twin Falls, Idaho; 42°36′01″N 114°27′14″W | United States | |
| Seri Saujana Bridge | 300 m (984 ft) | Steel | 2003 | Putrajaya; 2°54′49″N 101°40′35″E | Malaysia | (Note: The Seri Saujana Bridge is a hybrid between a cable-stayed bridge and an arch bridge, both designs are structural.) |
| Chancheng Dongping Bridge | 300 m (984 ft) | Steel | 2006 | Foshan, Guangdong; 22°58′38″N 113°07′05″E | China | |
| Nanning Bridge | 300 m (984 ft) | Steel | 2009 | Nanning, Guangxi; 22°47′08″N 108°22′04″E | China | |
| Karun 4 Arch Bridge | 300 m (984 ft) | Steel | 2015 | Kabusi, Chaharmahal and Bakhtiari province 31°38′29″N 50°29′23″E | Iran | |
| Tsakona Arch Bridge | 300 m (984 ft) | Steel | 2016 | Meligalas–Paradiseia, Peloponnese; 37°17′45″N 22°01′32″E | Greece | |
| Xianghuoyan Bridge | 300 m (984 ft) | CFST | 2017 | Kaiyang, Guizhou; 26°57′45″N 106°54′59″E | China | |
| Cuijiaying Hanjiang Bridge | 300 m (984 ft) ×2 | CFST | 2019 | Xiangyang, Hubei; 31°58′23″N 112°10′3″E | China | |
| Jinghai Expressway Lancang River Bridge | 300 m (984 ft) | Steel | 2021 | Jinghong, Yunnan; 22°2′15″N 100°46′53″E | China | |
| Gaowang Bridge | 300 m (984 ft) | Steel | 2021 | Wuzhou, Guangxi; 23°28′13″N 111°17′13″E | China | |
| Wumeihe Bridge | 300 m (984 ft) | CFST | 2022 | Fuquan, Guizhou; 26°50′42″N 107°41′34″E | China | |
| Jingxiong Bridge | 300 m (984 ft) | Steel | 2023 | Fangshan, Beijing; 39°47′20″N 116°15′2″E | China | |

== Under construction ==
| Name | Span meters | Material | Year opened | Location | Country | Ref |
|---|---|---|---|---|---|---|
| Fenglai Bridge | 580 m (1,903 ft) | Steel | 2026 | Wulong District, Chongqing; 29°23′26″N 107°17′29″E | China | |
| Luzhou Lantian Yangtze River Bridge | 570 m (1,870 ft) | Steel | 2027 | Luzhou, Sichuan; 28°51′52″N 105°25′17″E | China | |
| Huangbai Railway Hongshui River Bridge | 570 m (1,870 ft) | Concrete | 2028 | Leye County–Wangmo County, Guangxi; 25°1′58″N 106°26′37″E | China | |
| Lewang Expressway Hongshui River Bridge | 528 m (1,732 ft) | CFST | 2027 | Leye County–Wangmo County, Guangxi; 24°58′16″N 106°12′0″E | China | |
| Guniuhe Bridge | 520 m (1,706 ft) | Steel | 2026 | Shuicheng, Guizhou; 26°11′37″N 105°02′37″E | China | |
| Shili Heihuijiang Bridge | 518 m (1,699 ft) | CFST | 2028 | Fengqing County–Weishan County, Yunnan; 24°56′45″N 100°12′21″E | China | |
| Xininghe Bridge | 510 m (1,673 ft) | Concrete | 2026 | Pingshan County, Sichuan; 28°40′12″N 103°50′4″E | China | |
| Sichuan-Tibet Railway Jinsha River Bridge | 500 m (1,640 ft) | Steel | 2031 | Gonjo County, Tibet–Baiyü County, Sichuan; 30°43′54″N 98°57′45″E | China | |
| Kuizhou Yangtze River Bridge | 470 m (1,542 ft) | Steel | 2028 | Fengjie County, Chongqing; 30°59′28″N 109°25′18″E | China | |
| Zhaozhuang Bridge | 410 m (1,345 ft) | CFST | 2028 | Xingyi, Guizhou; 25°06′57″N 104°58′46″E | China | |
| West Central Ring Road Haihe River Bridge | 410 m (1,345 ft) | Steel | 2027 | Binhai, Tianjin; 39°0′43″N 117°36′20″E | China | |
| Dona Antónia Ferreira Bridge | 402 m (1,319 ft) | Concrete | 2026 | Porto–Vila Nova de Gaia, Porto District; 41°08′47″N 8°38′07″W | Portugal | |
| Taohe Bridge Lanyonglin | 400 m (1,312 ft) | CFST | 2026 | Yongjing County–Dongxiang County, Gansu; 35°55′23″N 103°22′24″E | China | |
| Xiniu Bridge | 390 m (1,280 ft) | Steel | 2026 | Weishan County–Fengqing County, Yunnan; 24°56′48″N 100°3′3″E | China | |
| Tongjianghe Bridge | 380 m (1,247 ft) | Concrete | 2026 | Pingchang County, Sichuan; 31°36′40″N 107°11′23″E | China | |
| Jianghan Tenth Bridge | 380 m (1,247 ft) | Steel | 2027 | Wuhan, Hubei; 30°35′31″N 114°10′16″E | China | |
| Jianzha Yellow River Bridge | 366 m (1,201 ft) | Steel | 2026 | Jainca County–Hualong County, Qinghai; 35°54′30″N 102°03′26″E | China | |
| Daheba Bridge | 360 m (1,181 ft) | CFST | 2026 | Jinyang County, Sichuan; 27°40′21″N 103°19′22″E | China | |
| Xiaohuanggou Jiangkou Bridge | 352 m (1,155 ft) | CFST | 2027 | | China | |
| Xisujiaohe Bridge | 350 m (1,148 ft) | CFST | 2026 | Leibo County, Sichuan; 28°9′59″N 103°27′19″E | China | |
| Wujiang Wengma Rail Bridge | 337 m (1,106 ft) | Concrete | 2026 | Weng'an County, Guizhou; 27°18′8″N 107°22′26″E | China | |
| Yichang Baimaxi Bridge | 330 m (1,083 ft) | Composite | 2028 | Yichang, Hubei; 30°47′13″N 111°15′23″E | China | |
| Xiyangjiang Bridge | 330 m (1,083 ft) | CFST | 2028 | Guangnan County, Yunnan; 23°51′57″N 105°18′6″E | China | |
| Qiaowo Bridge | 325 m (1,066 ft) | CFST | 2027 | Puge County, Sichuan; 27°29′41″N 102°28′49″E | China | |
| Jianyang Tuojiang Bridge | 320 m (1,050 ft) | CFST | 2027 | Jianyang, Sichuan; 30°26′56″N 104°34′11″E | China | |
| Shangwujiao Bridge | 310 m (1,017 ft) | CFST | 2026 | Leibo County, Sichuan; 28°15′29″N 103°33′1″E | China | |
| Liutonghe Bridge | 300 m (984 ft) | CFST | 2025 | Leibo County, Sichuan; 28°3′4″N 103°25′1″E | China | |

== History of largest spans ==
Flags refer to present national boundaries.

| Record | Name | Location | Main span | Crosses | Notes |
|---|---|---|---|---|---|
| 2024–present | Tian'e Longtan Bridge | Guangxi | 600 m (1,969 ft) | Hongshui River | |
| 2020–2024 | Pingnan Third Bridge | Guangxi | 575 m (1886 ft) | Xun River | |
| 2009–2020 | Chaotianmen Bridge | Chongqing | 552 m (1,811 ft) | Yangtze | |
| 2003–2009 | Lupu Bridge | Shanghai | 550 m (1,804 ft) | Huangpu River | |
| 1977–2003 | New River Gorge Bridge | Fayetteville, West Virginia | 518 m (1,699 ft) | New River | |
| 1931–1977 | Bayonne Bridge | Bayonne, New Jersey | 510 m (1,673 ft) | Kill Van Kull | |
| 1916–1931 | Hell Gate Bridge | New York City | 298 m (978 ft) | Hell Gate | |
| 1898–1916 | Upper Steel Arch Bridge | Niagara Falls, Ontario/ Niagara Falls, New York | 256 m (840 ft) | Niagara River | destroyed in 1938 |
| 1886–1898 | Luiz I Bridge | Porto | 172 m (564 ft) | Douro | |
| 1884–1886 | Garabit Viaduct | Ruynes-en-Margeride | 165 m (541 ft) | Truyère | |
| 1877–1884 | Maria Pia Bridge | Porto | 160 m (525 ft) | Douro | |
| 1874–1877 | Eads Bridge | St. Louis, Missouri | 158.5 m (520 ft) | Mississippi River | |
| 1860–1874 | Southwark Bridge | London | 73 m (240 ft) | River Thames | |
| 1848–1860 | Cascade Bridge | Windsor, New York | 76 m (249 ft) | Cascade Gulf | |
| 1819–1848 | Southwark Bridge | London | 73 m (240 ft) | River Thames | |
| 1796–1819 | Wearmouth Bridge | Sunderland | 72 m (236 ft) | River Wear | |
| 1479–1796 | Pont de Vieille-Brioude | Vieille-Brioude | 54 m (177 ft) | Allier | destroyed in 1822 |
| 1416–1479 | Castelvecchio Bridge | Verona, Veneto | 49 m (161 ft) | Adige | destroyed in 1945 |
| 1377–1416 | Trezzo sull'Adda Bridge | Trezzo sull'Adda, Lombardy | 72 m (236 ft) | Adda | destroyed in 1416 |
| 1356–1377 | Castelvecchio Bridge | Verona, Veneto | 49 m (161 ft) | Adige | destroyed in 1945 |
| 1341–1356 | Pont du Diable | Céret | 45 m (148 ft) | Tech | |
| 1147–1341 | Malabadi Bridge | Silvan | 39 m (128 ft) | Batman River | |
| 605–1147 | Zhaozhou Bridge | Zhao County, Hebei | 37 m (121 ft) | Xiao River | |
| 270–605 | Severan Bridge | Kahta | 34 m (112 ft) | Chabinas Creek | |
| 105–270 | Trajan's Bridge | Drobeta-Turnu Severin/ Kladovo | 51 m (167 ft) | Danube | wooden arches destroyed in 270 |
| 27 BC–105 | Ponte d'Augusto | Narni | 32 m (105 ft) | Nera | destroyed in 1855 |
| 62 BC–27 BC | Pons Fabricius | Rome | 25 m (82 ft) | Tiber | |
| 142 BC–62 BC | Pons Aemilius | Rome | 24 m (79 ft) | Tiber | destroyed in 1890s |

== See also ==
- List of longest masonry arch bridge spans
- List of longest beam bridge spans
- List of longest suspension bridge spans
- List of longest cable-stayed bridge spans
- List of longest bridges
- List of highest bridges
- List of tallest bridges
- List of spans (list of remarkable permanent wire spans)

== Notes and references ==
- References
- Notes
