= Pingnan Third Bridge =

Pingnan Third Bridge Chinese: 平南三桥
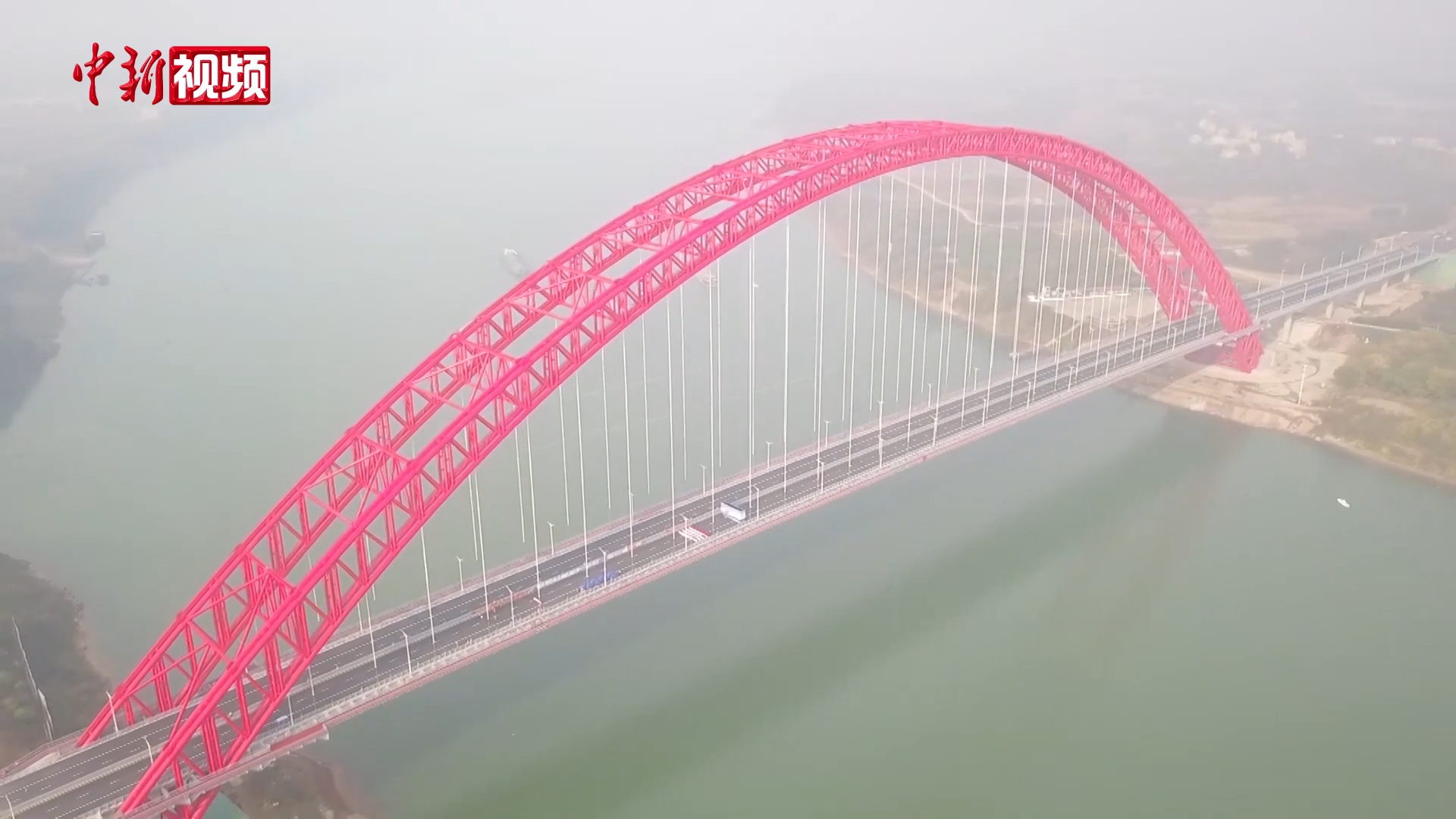
- Coordinates: 23°32′30″N 110°20′50″E
- Carries: Road traffic (S50 Lipu–Beiliu Expressway / Pingnan Western Ring Road)
- Crosses: Xun River (section of Xi River)
- Locale: Pingnan, Guangxi, China

Characteristics
- Design: CFST Arch bridge
- Total length: 1,035 m (3,396 ft)
- Width: 34.30 m (112.5 ft)
- Height: 140 m (460 ft)
- Longest span: 575 m (1,886 ft)
- Clearance below: 21 m (69 ft) (navigational)

History
- Construction start: 7 August 2018
- Opened: 28 December 2020

Location
- Interactive map of Pingnan Third Bridge; Chinese: 平南三桥

The Pingnan Third Bridge (Chinese: 平南三桥; pinyin: Píngnán Sānqiáo), internationally known as Pingnan Third Bridge, is a road bridge that crosses the Xun River, a section of the Xi River (which later flows into the Pearl River). It is part of the new western bypass of Pingnan in the Guangxi province of the People's Republic of China.

The bridge, with a total length of 1035 m, carries four lanes of traffic with emergency lanes and sidewalks on both sides. It consists of a 170 m long approach bridge on the south bank, a CFST arch bridge with a main span of 575 m, and a 280 m long approach bridge on the north bank.

As of 2025, with its main span of 575 m, it is the world's second-largest arch bridge after the Tian'e-Longtan Bridge (600 m span) was inaugurated in 2024. It is larger than the Chaotianmen Bridge (552 m span), which previously topped the list of largest arch bridges, and significantly surpasses the Bosideng Bridge, which, with a span of 530 m, was previously the largest CFST arch bridge.

Its large, red arch is 34.3 m wide and consists of two arch ribs connected and stiffened by wind bracing. The sidewalks are routed outside the arch. Each arch rib is made of four steel tubes with a diameter of 140 cm, which are connected transversely with 85 cm diameter tubes and vertically with 70 cm diameter tubes. The ribs are 4.20 m wide, and their structural depth decreases from 17 m at the abutments to 8.5 m at the crown. To avoid problems associated with filling the tubes with concrete (incomplete filling, shrinkage of the concrete), a vacuum pumping method and a special type of concrete were developed.

The bridge deck is a composite structure of a steel plate girder grid and a 15 cm thick concrete slab.

The southern abutment could be founded relatively easily on the bedrock, while the northern abutment in the local gravel required particularly extensive and technologically demanding foundation work. The paired piers of the approach bridges are supported on bored piles.

Construction began on August 7, 2018. The completed bridge was opened to traffic on December 28, 2020.

The arch and the bridge deck were prefabricated in large sections, weighing up to 215 tons, which were delivered by ship and lifted into position by a large cable crane. Two tall truss towers were built first for the cable crane, to which the arch halves, erected by the balanced cantilever method, were also anchored back. The respective crane loads and the tension of the back-anchoring had to be continuously monitored and adjusted, partly with the help of satellite-based surveying.

== Sources ==
- Zheng, Jielian (2024-10-14). Innovative Technology for 500-meter Scale Concrete-Filled Steel Tubular Arch Bridge Construction. Springer Nature. ISBN 978-981--971245-8.
- Zheng, Jielian; Du, Hailong; Mu, Tingmin; Liu, Jiaping; Qin, Dayan; Mei, Guoxiong; Tu, Bing (20 September 2021). "Innovations in Design, Construction, and Management of Pingnan Third Bridge – The Largest-Span Arch Bridge in the World". Structural Engineering International. doi:10.1080/10168664.2021.1963300.
