= Chaotianmen =

Chaotianmen may refer to:

- Chaotianmen Bridge, Chongqing, China, a road bridge that connects Jiangbei District with Nan'an District, above the Yangtze River
- Chaotianmen funicular, Yuzhong District, Chongqing
- Chaotianmen Station, Chongqing, China, a subway station of the Chongqing Rail Transit Line 1
