= Deyu Expressway Wu River Bridge =

Deyu Expressway Wu River Bridge 德余高速乌江特大桥
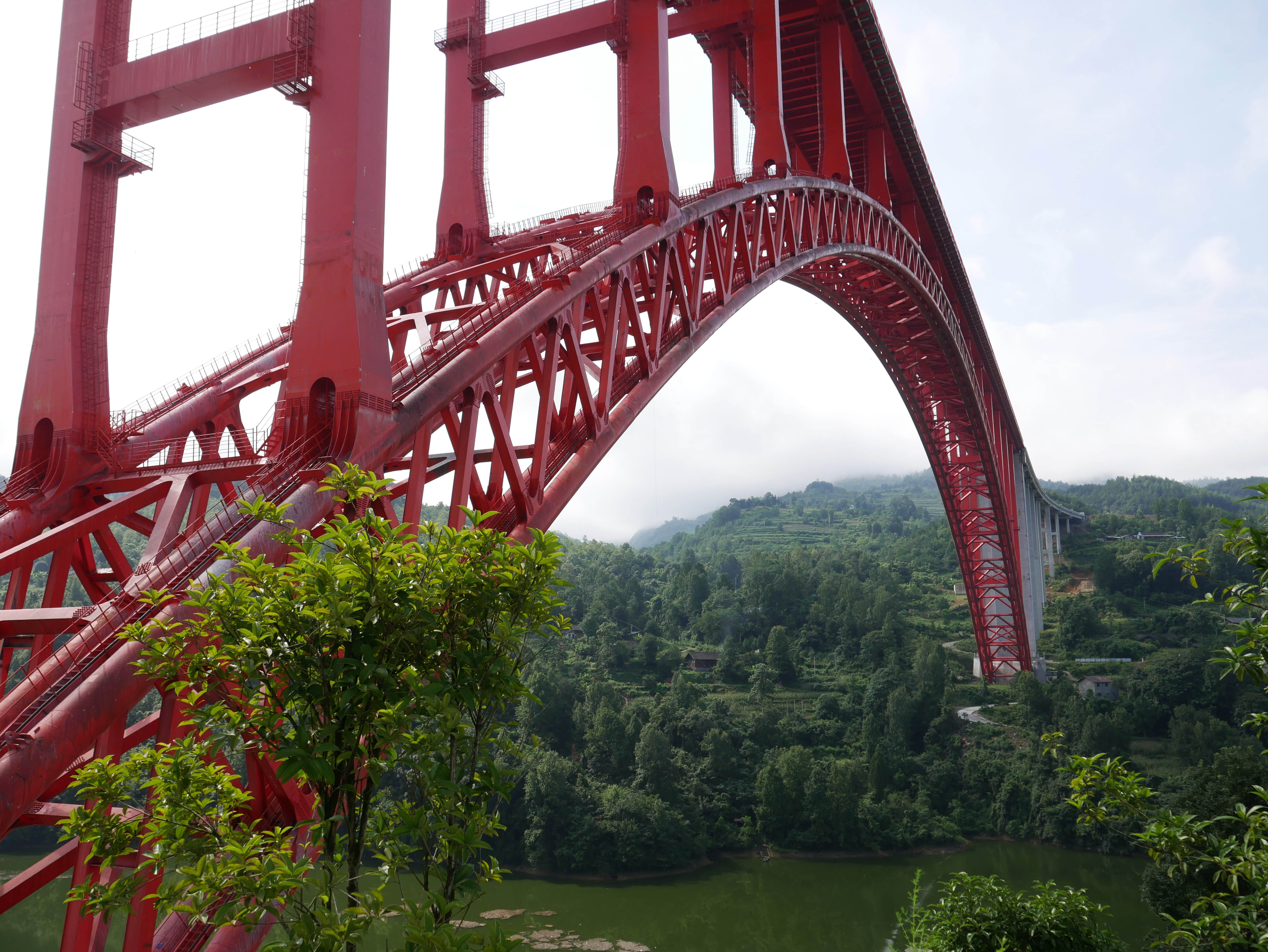
- Coordinates: 27°39′03″N 107°54′44″E
- Carries: Guizhou S29 Deyu Expressway
- Crosses: Wu River (Yangtze tributary)
- Locale: Fenggang County–Sinan County, Guizhou

Characteristics
- Design: CFST deck arch bridge
- Material: Steel, concrete
- Total length: 1,834 m (6,017 ft)
- Longest span: 475 m (1,558 ft)
- Clearance above: 220 m (720 ft)

History
- Opened: 10 July 2023

Location
- Interactive map of Deyu Expressway Wu River Bridge

The Deyu Expressway Wu River Bridge (Chinese: 德余高速乌江特大桥) is an arch bridge over the Wu River between Fenggang County and Sinan County, Guizhou in the People's Republic of China. The bridge is one of the largest arch bridge in the world with a 475 metres (1,558 ft) main span.

== See also ==
- List of bridges in China
- List of longest arch bridge spans
- List of highest bridges
