= Daxiaojing Bridge =

Daxiaojing Bridge 大小井大桥
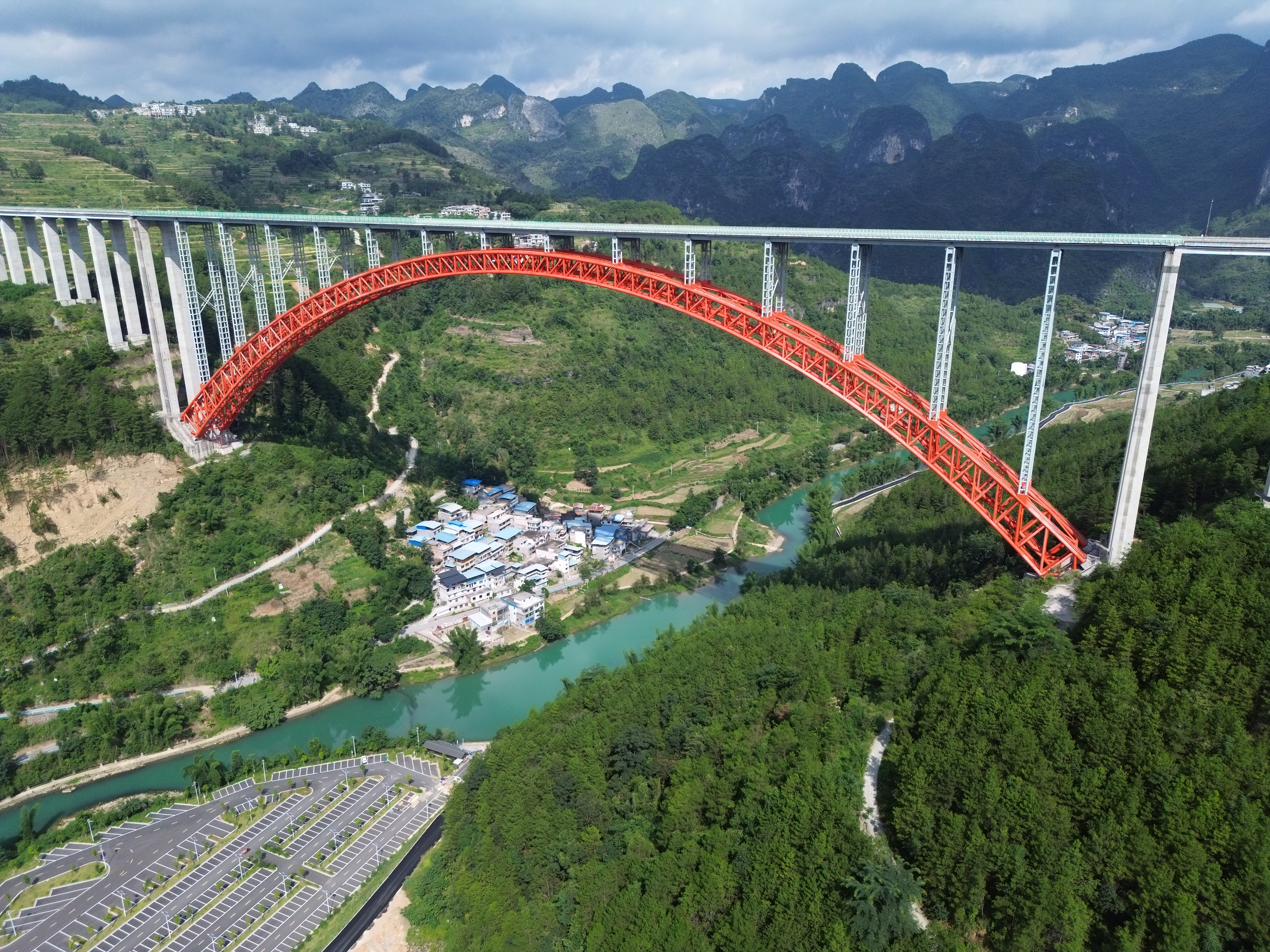
- Coordinates: 25°32′57″N 106°51′47″E
- Carries: Guizhou S62 Yuqing–Anlong Expressway
- Crosses: Dajing River
- Locale: Luodian County, Guizhou

Characteristics
- Design: CFST deck arch bridge
- Material: Steel, concrete
- Total length: 1,501 m (4,925 ft)
- Longest span: 450 m (1,480 ft)
- Clearance above: 216 m (709 ft)

History
- Construction start: 29 June 2016
- Opened: 16 August 2019

Location
- Interactive map of Daxiaojing Bridge

The Daxiaojing Bridge (Chinese: 大小井大桥) carries the Yuqing–Anlong Expressway over the Dajing River in Luodian County, Guizhou in the People's Republic of China. The bridge is one of the largest arch bridge in the world with a 450 metres (1,480 ft) main span.

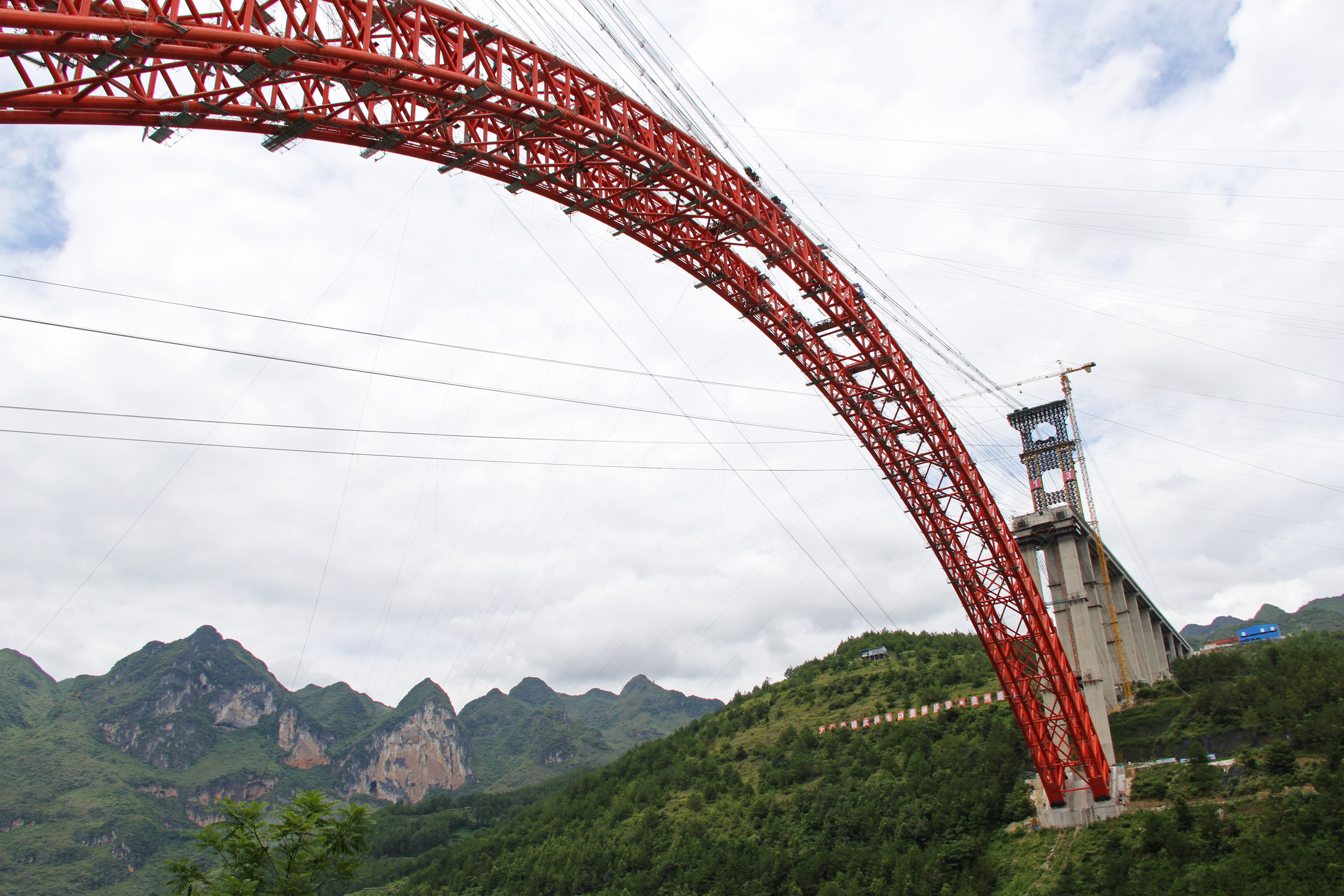
Bridge under construction

== See also ==
- List of bridges in China
- List of longest arch bridge spans
- List of highest bridges
