= Zhaoqing Bridge =

Xijiang Railway Bridge
- Coordinates: 23°7′18″N 112°24′11″E
- Carries: Trains Only
- Crosses: Xi River
- Locale: Zhaoqing, Guangdong, China

Characteristics
- Design: Arch bridge
- Total length: 604.5 m (1,983 ft)
- Width: 38 m (125 ft)
- Height: 122 m (400 ft) (steel arch bottom to arch top)
- Longest span: 450 m (1,476 ft)

History
- Construction end: 2014

The Xijiang Railway Bridge (Chinese: 西江特大桥; pinyin: xī jiāng tè dàqiáo), is located on the Guangzhou to Nanning highspeed railway with a 450-meter main span that is the world's longest railway-only arch bridge and, together with the Mingzhou Bridge, the second largest steel box arch after the Lupu Bridge in Shanghai. The basket handle arch carries 2 railway lines over the Xi River.

== See also ==
- List of longest arch bridge spans
