= Guantang Bridge =

Guantang Bridge 官塘大桥
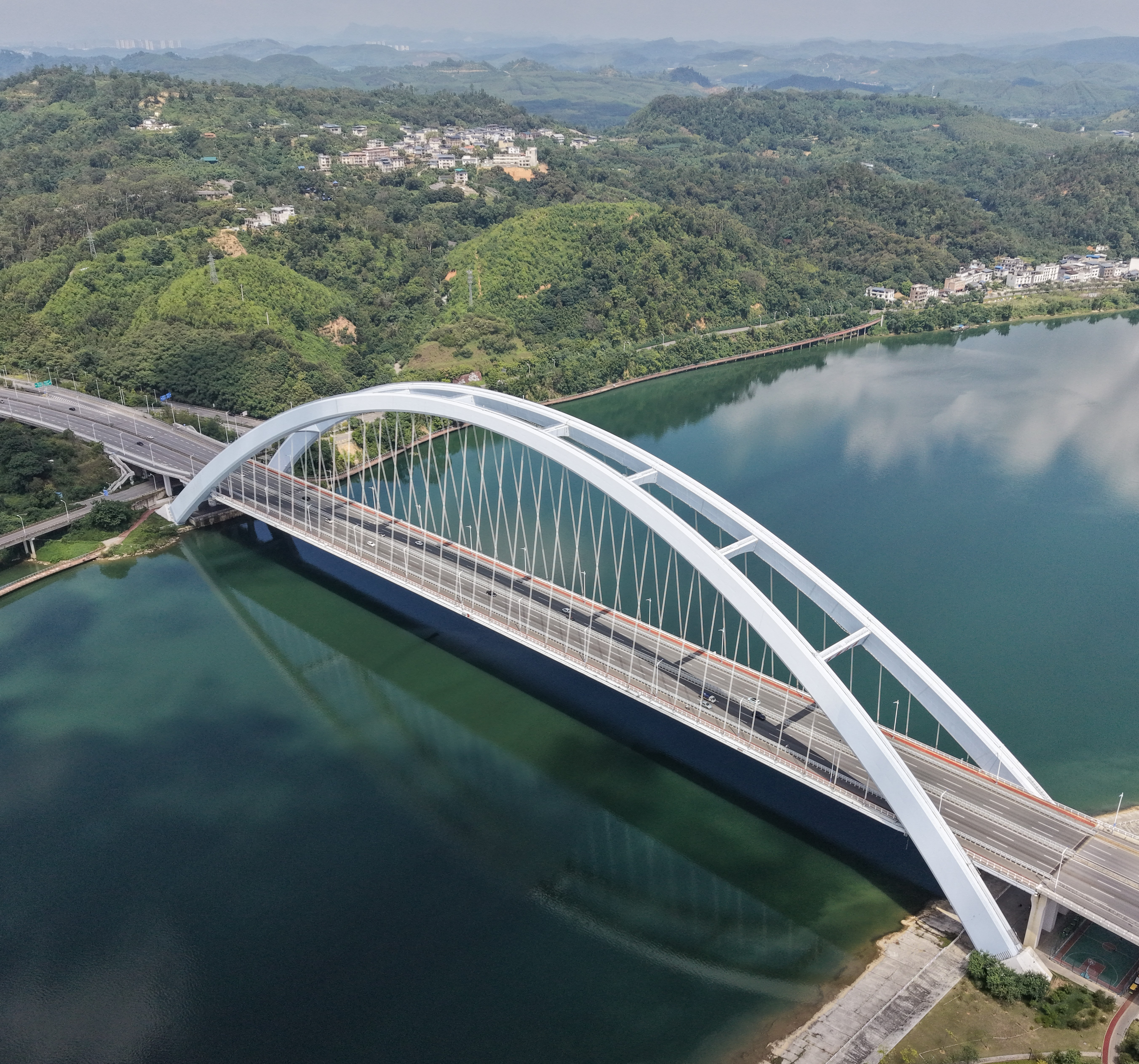
- Coordinates: 24°23′05″N 109°29′40″E
- Crosses: Liu River
- Locale: Liuzhou, Guangxi

Characteristics
- Design: Through arch bridge
- Material: Steel
- Total length: 1,155.5 m (3,791 ft)
- Longest span: 457 m (1,499 ft)
- No. of lanes: 6

History
- Constructed by: China Railway Group Limited
- Construction start: 2 February 2016
- Opened: 27 November 2018

Location
- Interactive map of Guantang Bridge

The Guantang Bridge (Chinese: 官塘大桥) is an arch bridge over the Yong River in Liuzhou, Guangxi, China. The bridge is one of the largest arch bridge in the world with a 457 metres (1,499 ft) main span.

== See also ==
- List of bridges in China
- List of longest arch bridge spans
