= Mingzhou Bridge =

Mingzhou Bridge 明州大桥
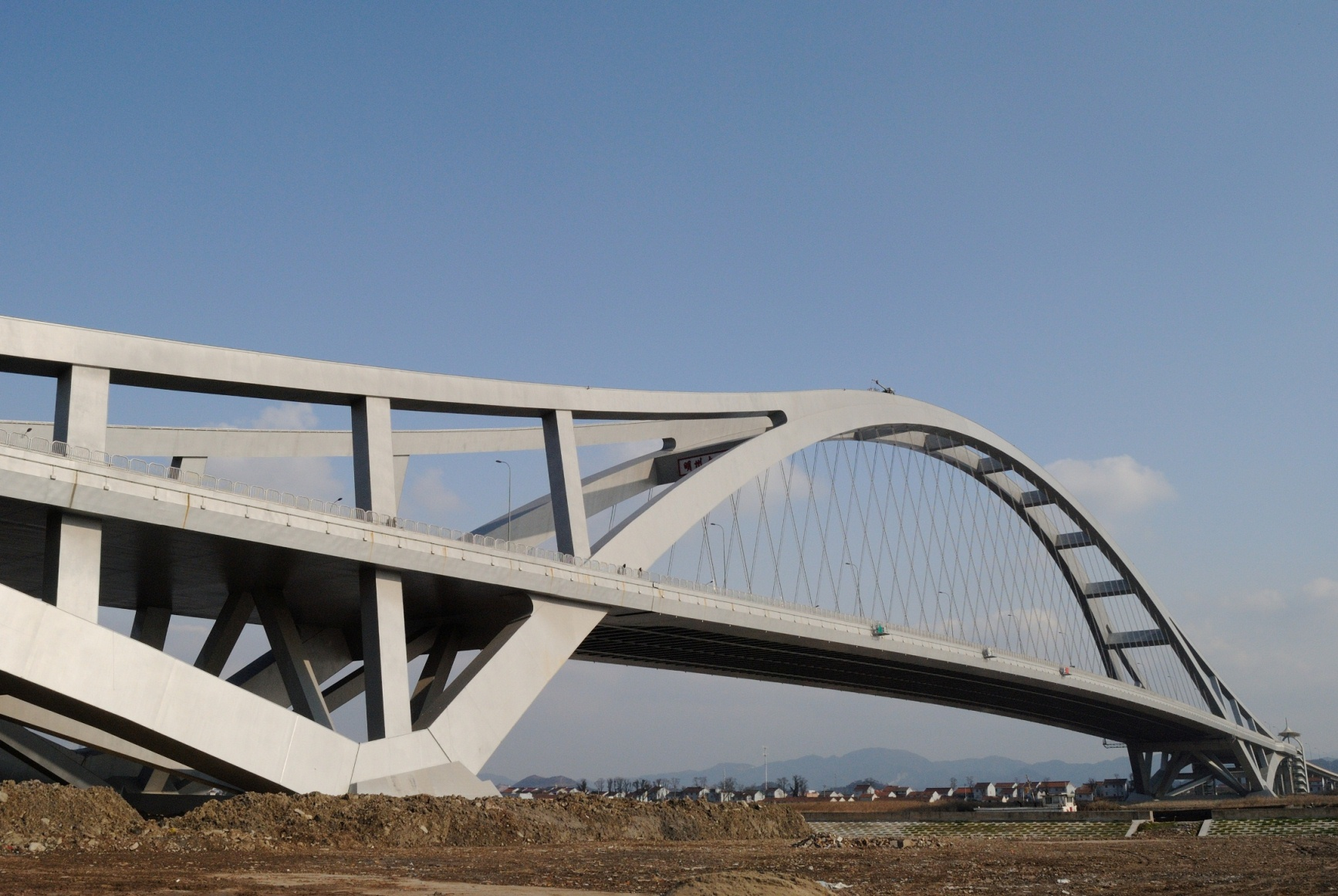
- Coordinates: 29°54′50″N 121°39′02″E
- Carries: East Ring Road North
- Crosses: Yong River (Zhejiang)
- Locale: Ningbo, Zhejiang
- Preceded by: Sanguantang Bridge
- Followed by: Qingshuipu Bridge

Characteristics
- Design: Through arch bridge
- Material: Steel
- Total length: 1,250 m (4,100 ft)
- Longest span: 450 m (1,480 ft)
- No. of lanes: 8

History
- Construction start: 13 February 2008
- Opened: 5 May 2011

Location
- Interactive map of Mingzhou Bridge

The Mingzhou Bridge (Chinese: 明州大桥) carries the East Ring Road North over the Yong River in Ningbo, Zhejiang in the People's Republic of China. It connects Zhenhai and Beilun districts.

The bridge is one of the largest arch bridge in the world with a 450 metres (1,480 ft) main span.

Bridge diagram

== See also ==
- List of bridges in China
- List of longest arch bridge spans
