= Fenglai Bridge =

Fenglai Daxi River Grand Bridge 凤来大溪河特大桥
- Coordinates: 29°23′26″N 107°17′29″E
- Carries: Wuliang Expy
- Crosses: Daxi River
- Locale: Wulong District, Chongqing
- Official name: 凤来大溪河特大桥

Characteristics
- Design: Steel deck arch bridge
- Total length: 1,123 m (3,684 ft)
- Longest span: 580 m (1,900 ft)
- Clearance below: 310 m (1,020 ft)

History
- Construction end: 2026

Location
- Interactive map of Fenglai Daxi River Grand Bridge

The Fenglai Daxi River Grand Bridge (Chinese: 凤来大溪河特大桥) is a steel deck arch bridge over the Daxi River in Wulong District, Chongqing, China. The bridge is one of the largest arch bridge in the world with a 580-metre (1,900 ft) main span and one of the highest bridges in the world with a deck 310 metres (1,020 ft) above the river.

== See also ==
- List of bridges in China
- List of longest arch bridge spans
- List of highest bridges
