= Najiehe Railway Bridge =

Najiehe Railway Bridge 纳界河特大桥
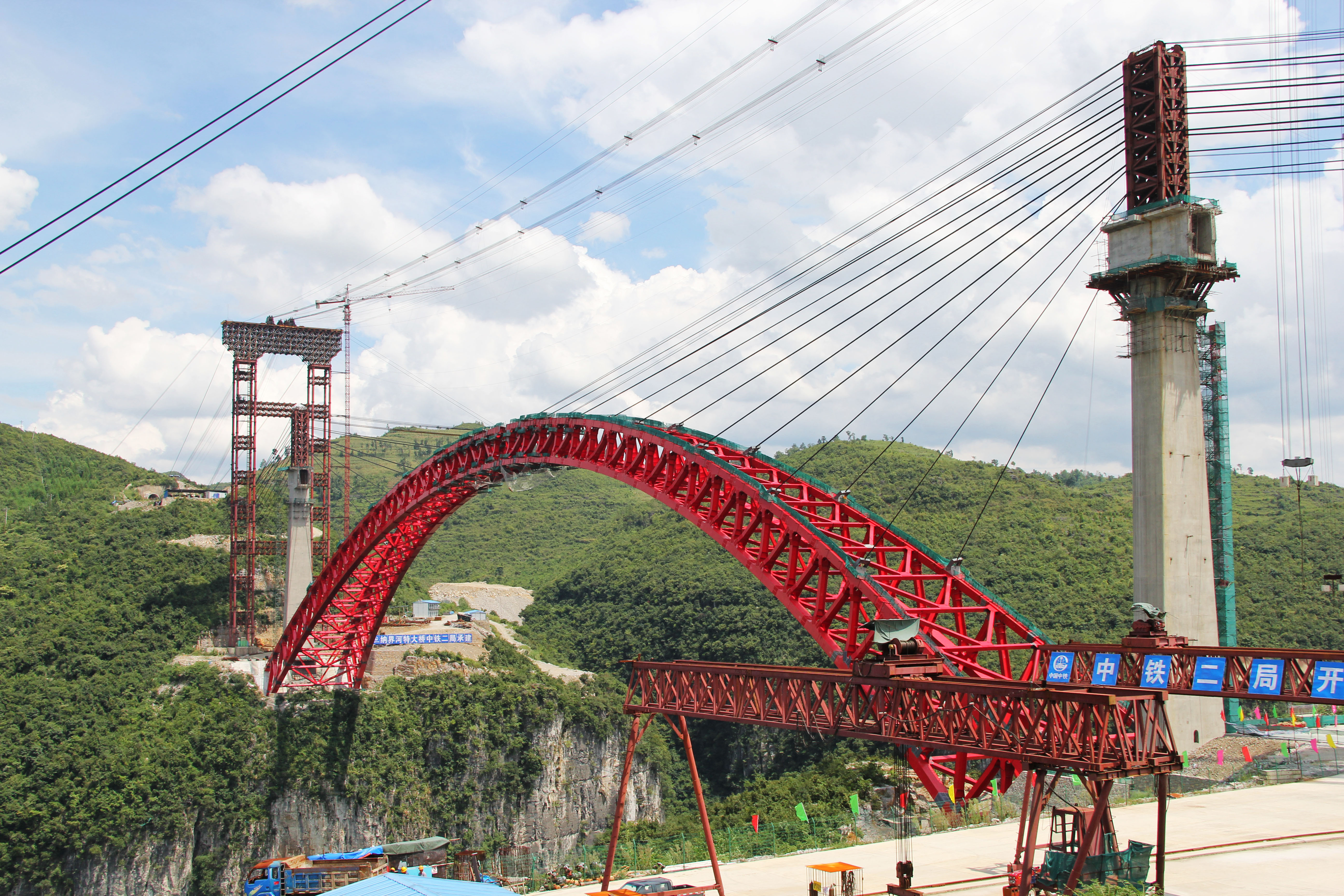
- Coordinates: 26.7029°N 106.1631°E
- Carries: Lindai-Zhijin Railway
- Crosses: Sancha River
- Locale: Guizhou, China

Characteristics
- Design: Arch bridge
- Material: Steel
- Total length: 810 m (2,660 ft)
- Longest span: 352 m (1,155 ft)
- Clearance above: 285 m (935 ft) to reservoir
- Clearance below: 310 m (1,020 ft)

History
- Opened: January 2016

The Najiehe Railway Bridge is a steel arch bridge in central Guizhou, China. With a rail height of 305 m (1,001 ft), this is the second highest railway bridge in world. The truss arch is also one of the longest arch bridges with a main span of 352 m (1,155 ft). The bridge crosses the Sancha River between Zhijin in Bijie and Qingzhen in Guiyang. The bridge is part of the new Lindai-Zhijin Railway line between Zhijin County and Guiyang.

The bridge crosses over the reservoir created by the Dongfeng Dam. Although the Najiehe Railway Bridge is officially 310 metres high, the drop to the water is only 285 meters when the reservoir is at full water level.

== See also ==
- List of highest bridges in the world
- List of longest arch bridge spans
