= Caiyuanba Bridge =

Bridge crossing the Yangtze River in Chongqing, China

Caiyuanba Bridge 菜園壩大橋
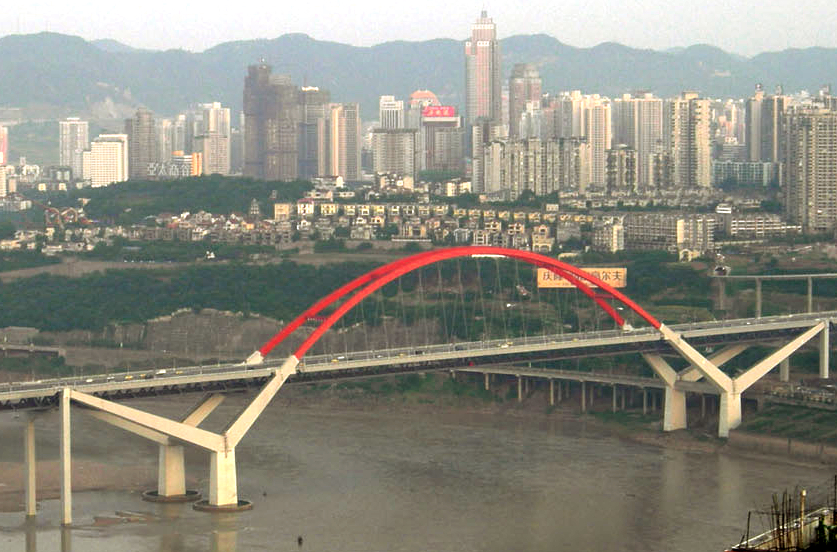
- Coordinates: 29.543222°N 106.547944°E
- Carries: 6 lanes of road traffic 2 tracks of Metro line 3
- Crosses: Yangtze River
- Locale: Chongqing, China

Characteristics
- Design: Arch Bridge
- Total length: 800 metres (2,600 ft)
- Width: 36.5 metres (120 ft)
- Longest span: 420 metres (1,380 ft)

History
- Construction cost: 2 billion Yuan (US$258 million)
- Opened: 29 October 2007

The Caiyuanba Bridge is an arch bridge which crosses the Yangtze River in Chongqing, China. Completed in 2007, the arch spans 420 metres (1,380 ft) ranking among the longest arch bridges in the world. The bridge carries 6 lanes of traffic and two tracks of Chongqing Rail Transit Line 3 between the Nan'an District south of the Yangtze River and the Yuzhong District to the north.

== See also ==
- List of longest arch bridge spans
- Yangtze River bridges and tunnels
