= Yachi Railway Bridge =

Yachi Railway Bridge 鸭池河特大桥
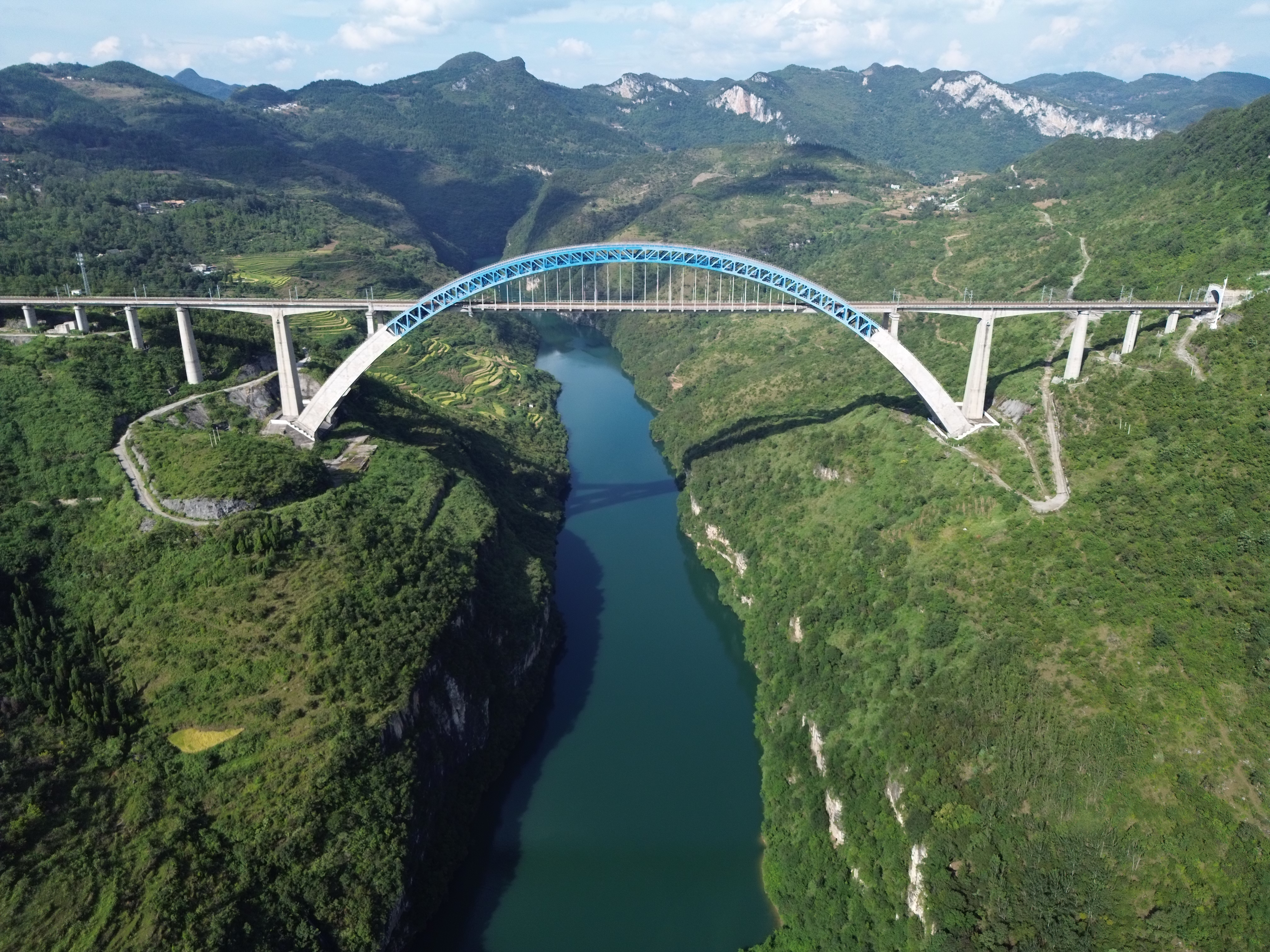
- Coordinates: 26.8844°N 106.2903°E
- Carries: Chengdu–Guangzhou High-Speed Railway
- Crosses: Yachi River
- Locale: Qianxi County, Guizhou, China

Characteristics
- Design: Arch Bridge
- Material: Steel, concrete
- Total length: 1,466.5 m (4,811 ft)
- Longest span: 436 m (1,430 ft)
- Clearance below: 272 m (892 ft)

History
- Opened: 2019

Location
- Interactive map of Yachi Railway Bridge

The Yachi River Bridge is an arch bridge in Guizhou, China. The bridge, at 272 m (892 ft), is one of the highest in world. It is also one of the longest arch bridges with a main span of 436 m (1,430 ft). The bridge crosses the Yachi River between Qianxi County in Bijie and Qingzhen in Guiyang. The bridge is part of the Chengdu–Guiyang high-speed railway.

Although Yachi Railway Bridge is officially 272 metres high, the bridge crosses over the reservoir of the Suofengying Dam so it is only approximately 232 metres above the water level.

== See also ==
- List of longest arch bridge spans
- List of highest bridges in the world
