= Tian'e Longtan Bridge =

Tian'e Longtan Bridge 天峨龙滩特大桥
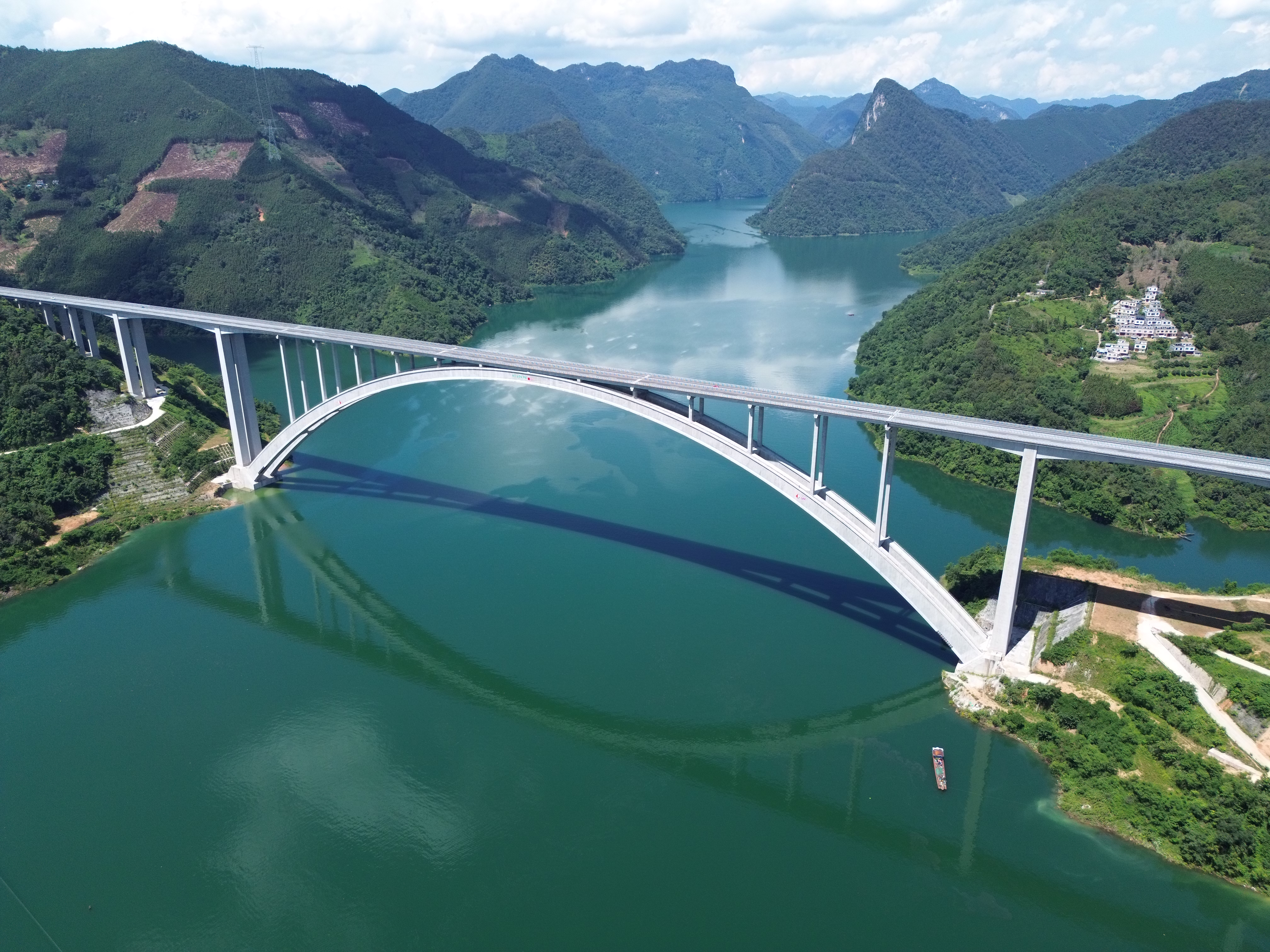
- Coordinates: 25°04′41″N 107°01′16″E
- Carries: Guangxi S26 Dan'e Expressway
- Crosses: Hongshui River; Longtan Dam reservoir

Characteristics
- Design: Arch bridge
- Material: Concrete
- Total length: 2,488.55 m (8,164.5 ft)
- Width: 26 m (85 ft)
- Longest span: 600 m (2,000 ft)
- Clearance above: 140 m (460 ft) above reservoir 290 m (950 ft) above original level

History
- Construction start: January 2020
- Opened: 1 February 2024

Location
- Interactive map of Tian'e Longtan Bridge

The Tian'e Longtan Bridge (Chinese: 天峨龙滩特大桥) carries the Nantian Expressway over the Hongshui River in the Guangxi Zhuang Autonomous Region of China.

The Nantian Expressway connects Nandan County and Tian'e County in the prefecture-level city of Hechi.

Opened on 1 February 2024, the motorway bridge crosses the reservoir of the large Longtan Dam, located 6 km downstream, with two closely spaced structures for the two directions of travel, which are only connected at the foundations and by crossbeams in the arches. Each of the two arches has a span of 600 m. It is now the largest arch bridge in the world, ahead of the previous leader, the Pingnan Third Bridge.

The 2,488.55 m (8,164.5 ft) long and 26 m (85 ft) wide bridge crosses the deep reservoir at a height of 140 m above the highest water level or 290 m above the original river.

Its arches have a skeleton of four parallel steel tubes, which are connected by numerous diagonal and transverse struts like a truss. These arches were erected using the balanced cantilever method by supporting them on piers and temporary masts with multiple stays, and individual prefabricated sections were delivered by a cable crane stretched across the reservoir. After the completion of these steel arches, they were encased in formwork and coated with concrete. Piers made of reinforced concrete stand in front of and on the arches. The deck girders were then erected using the cantilever method from prestressed concrete.

Construction work began in January 2020 and was completed in January 2024.

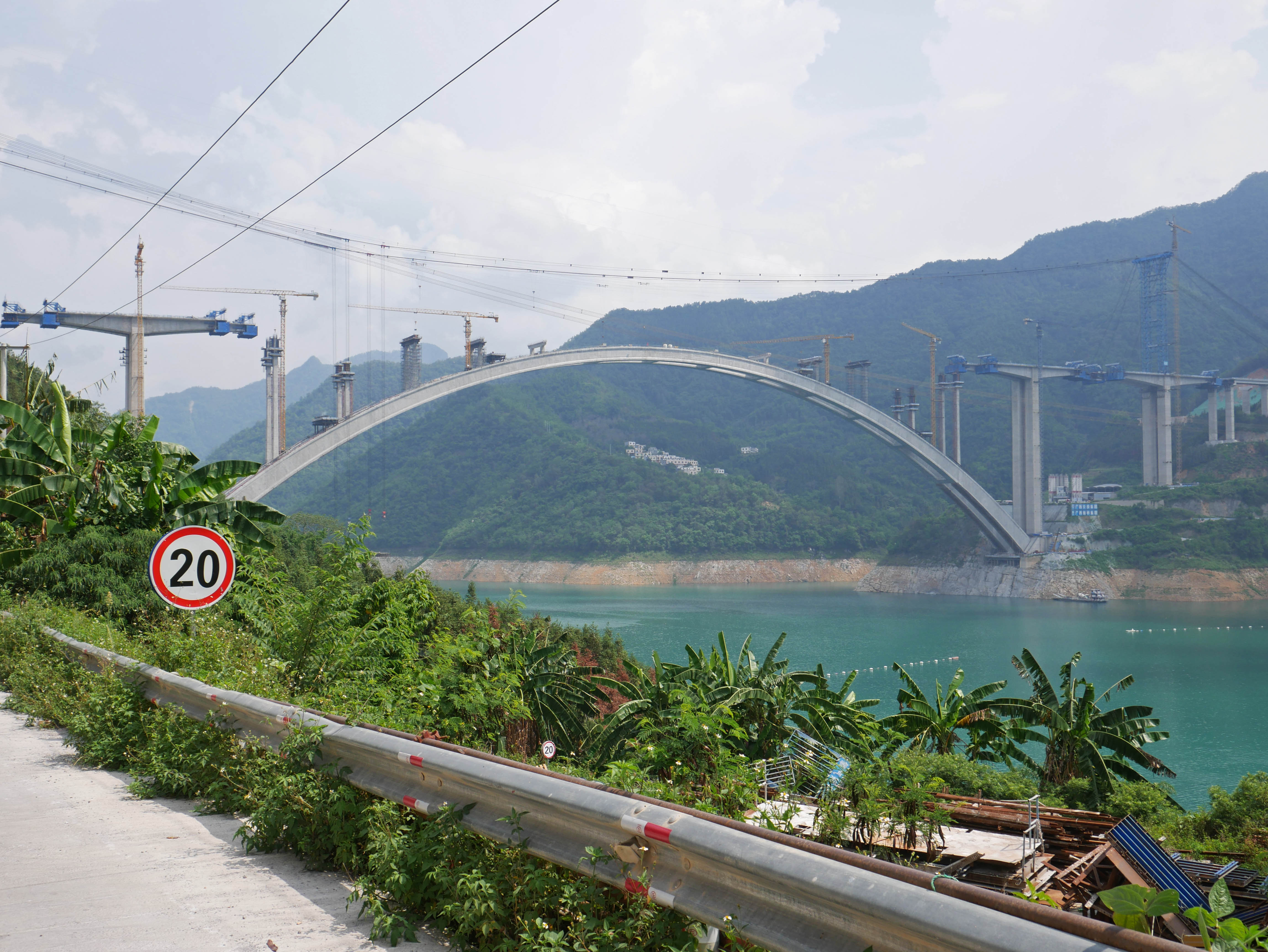
Bridge under construction (summer 2023). Cantilevered pylons and an overhead cable crane are visible

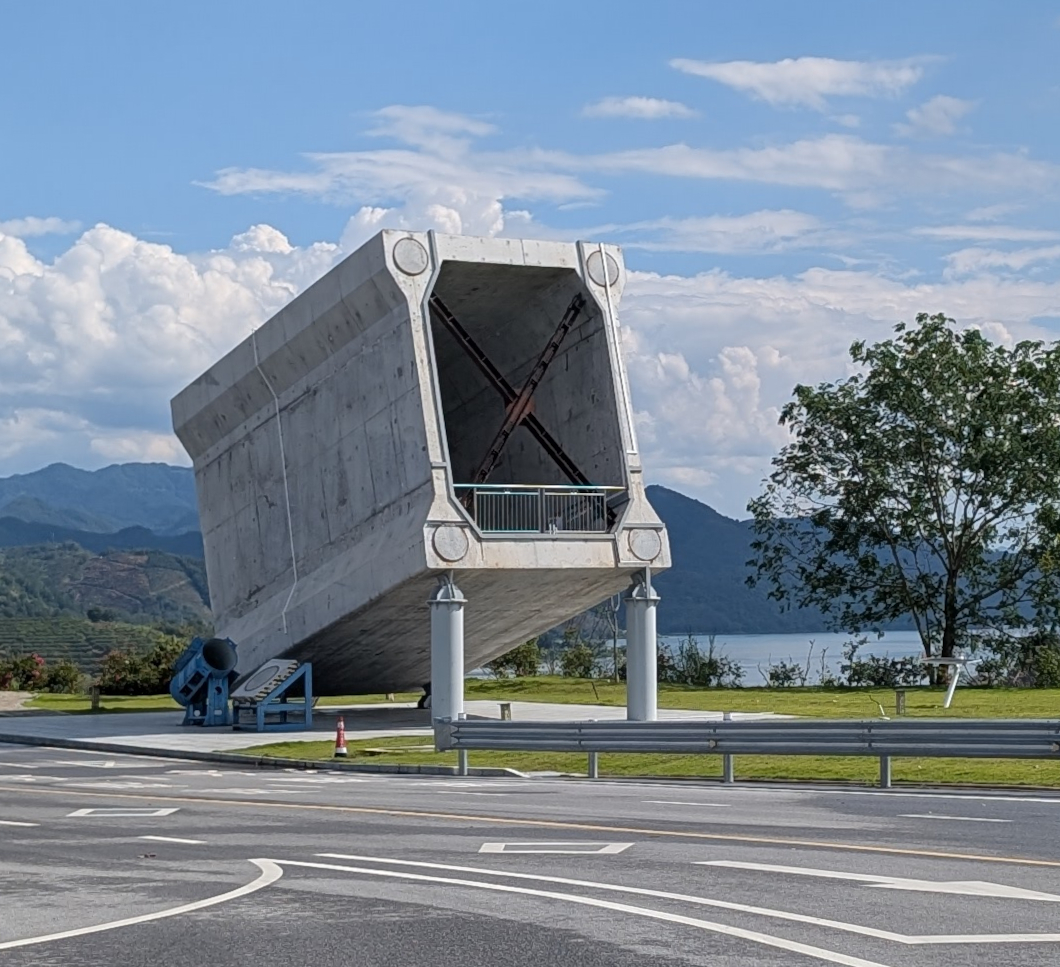
A bridge prototype at the nearest expressway exit

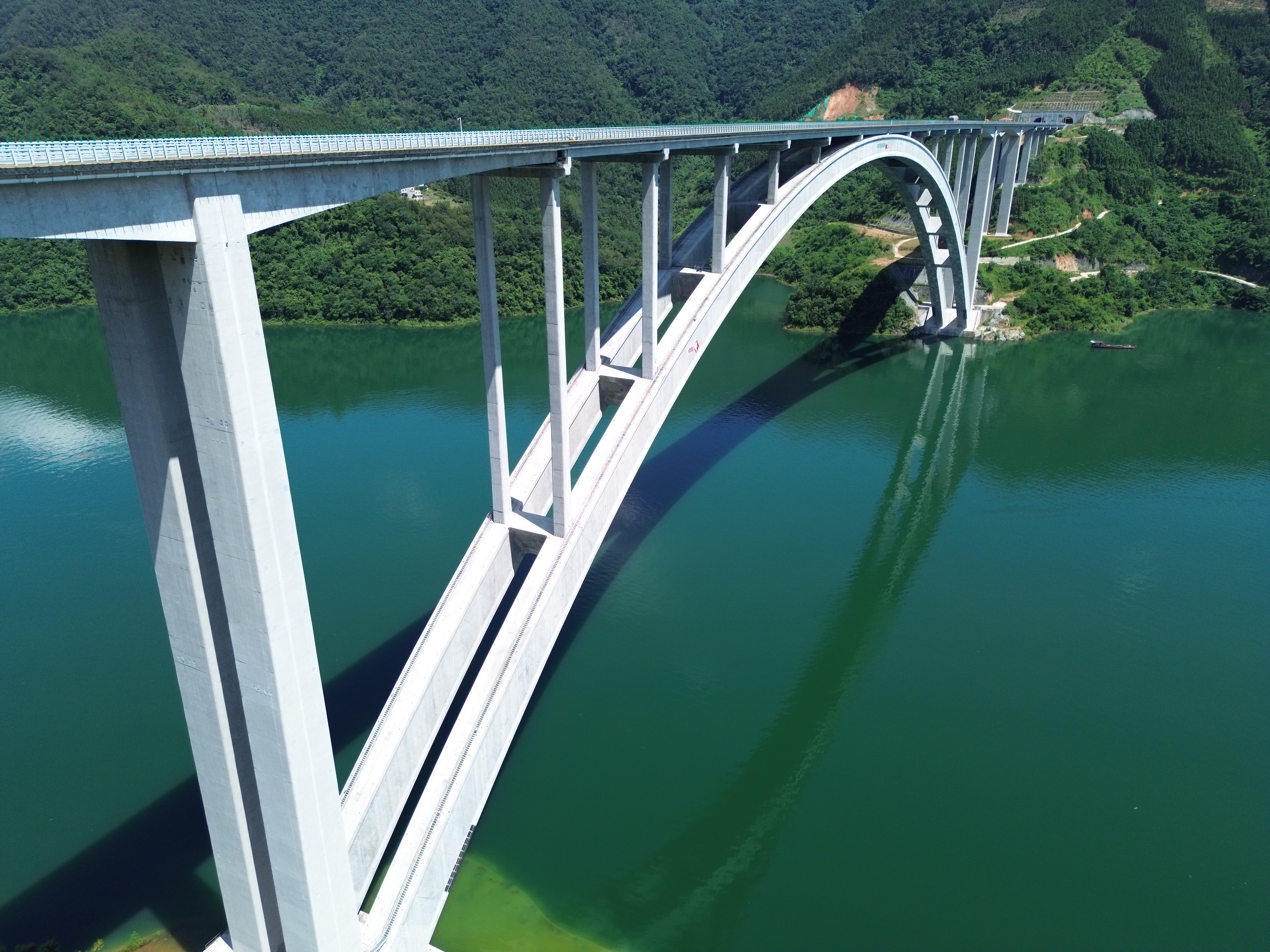
Bridge details

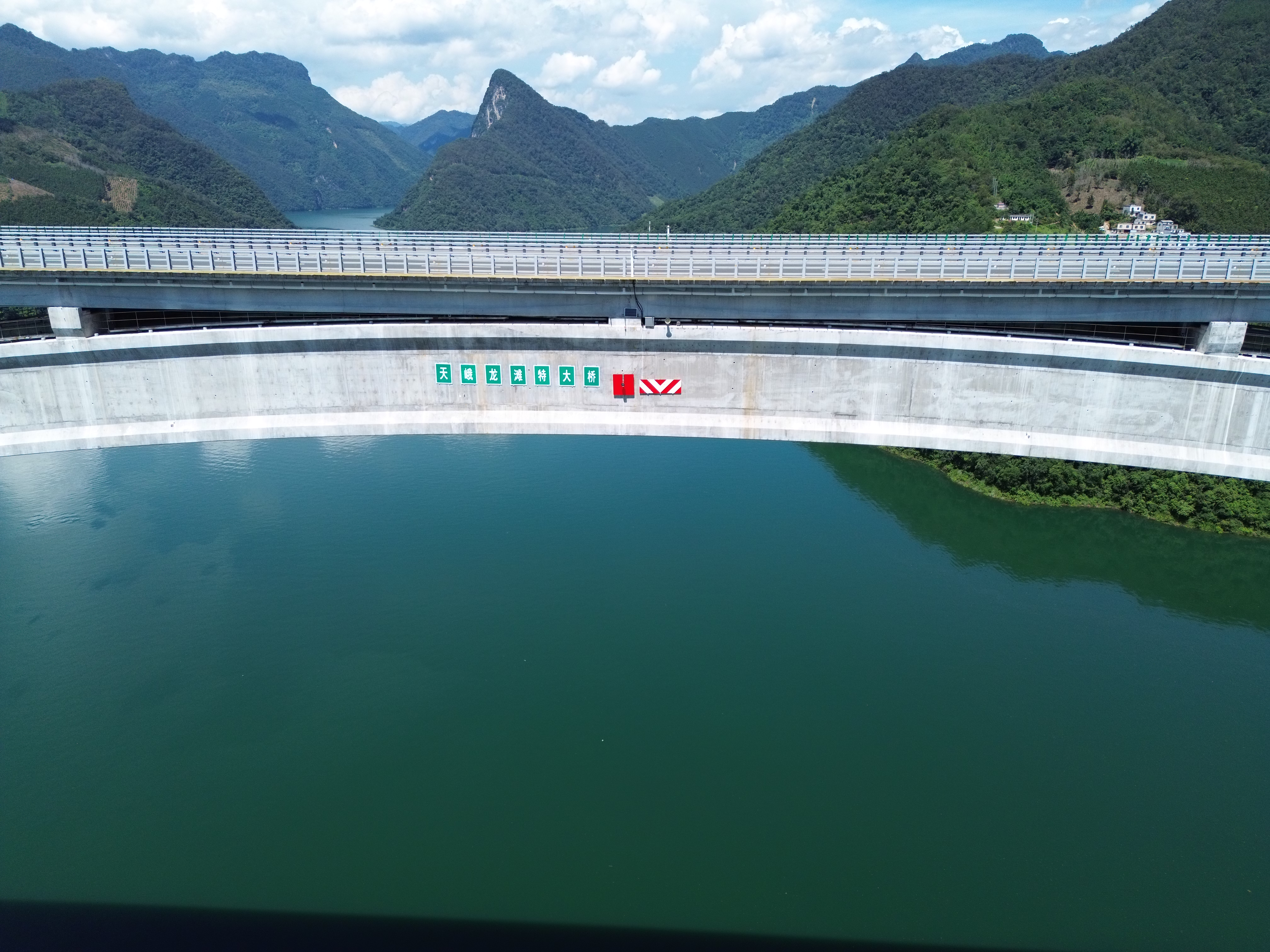
Bridge details

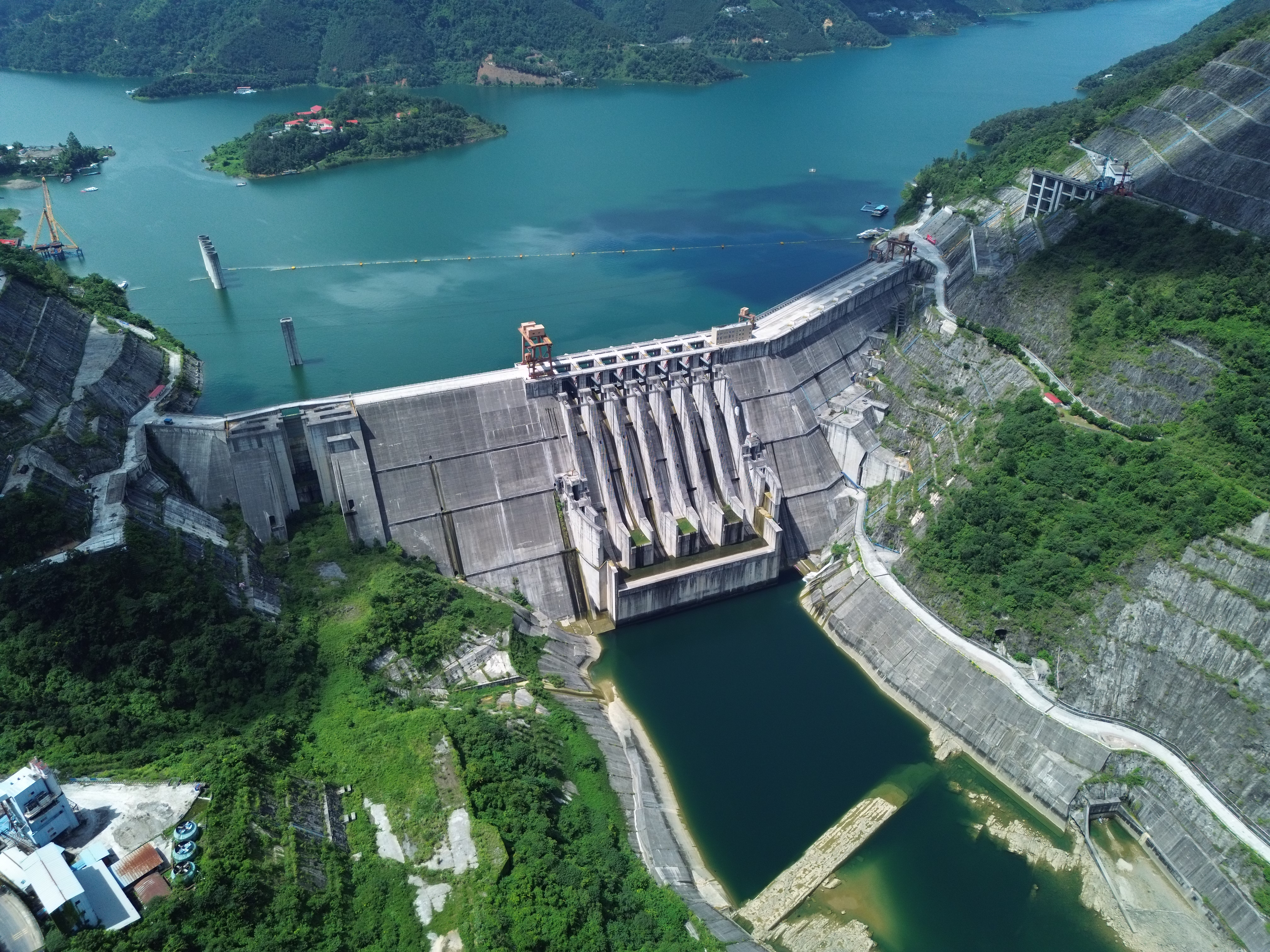
The Longtan Dam

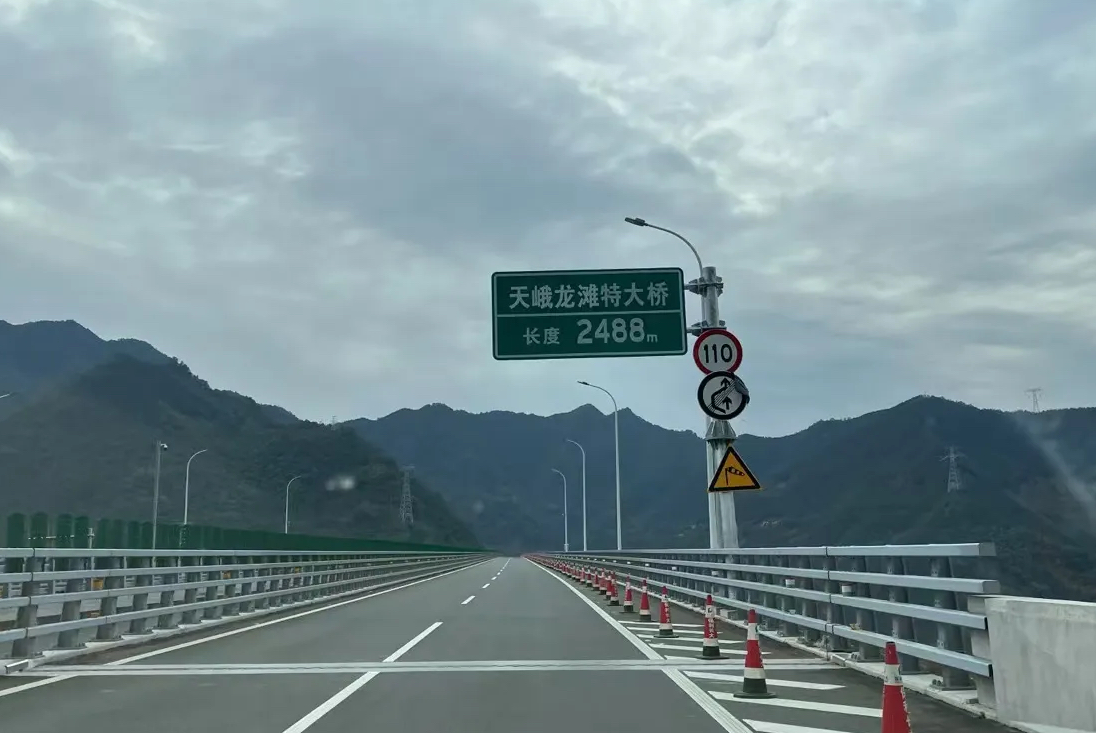
Sign

== See also ==
- List of bridges in China
- List of longest arch bridge spans
- List of highest bridges
