= Liancheng Bridge =

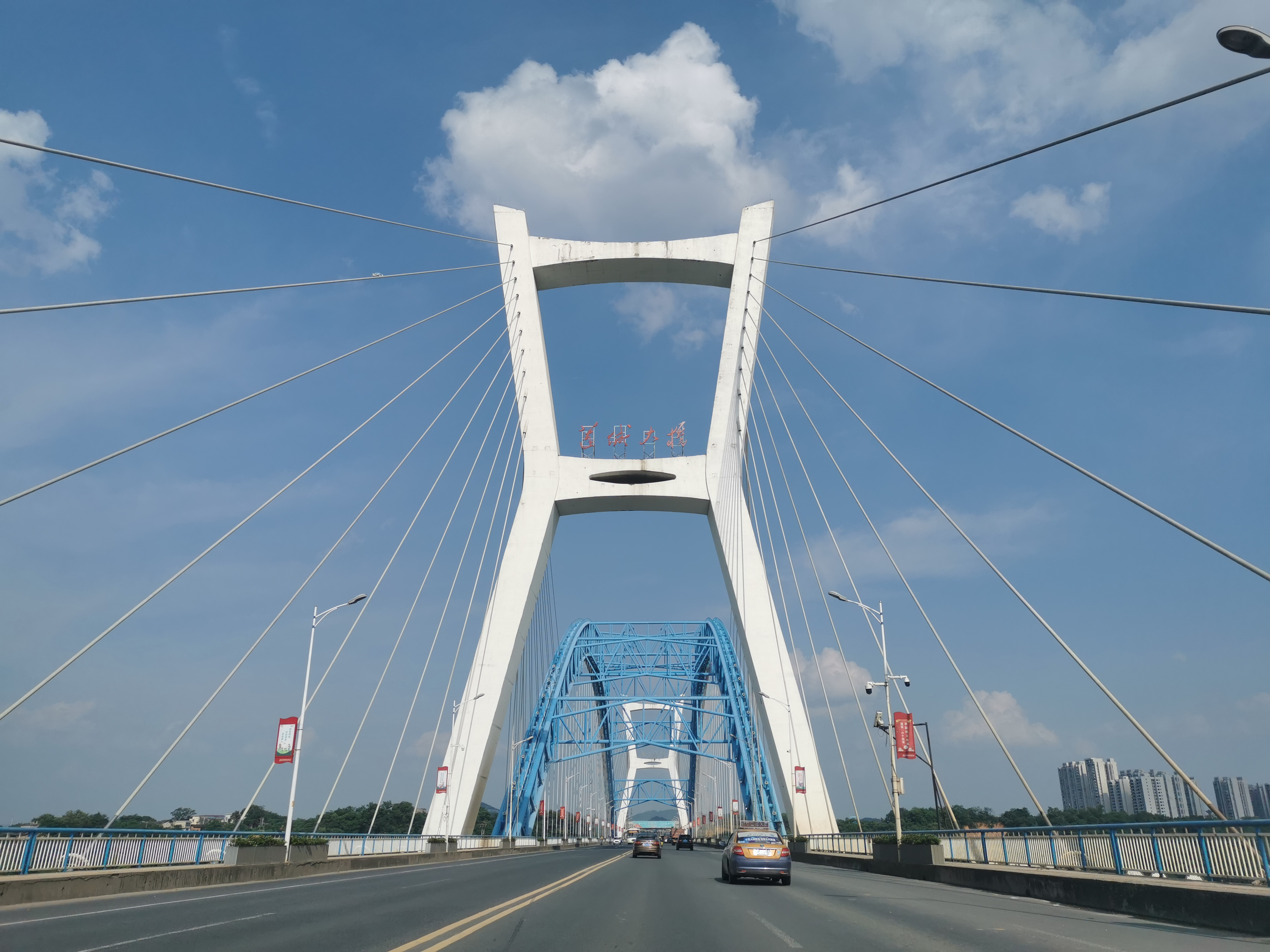
- Liancheng Bridge in May 2021
- Coordinates: 27°53′30″N 112°58′22″E
- Carries: Motor vehicles, pedestrians and bicycles
- Crosses: Xiang River
- Locale: Xiangtan, Hunan, China
- Other name: Xiangtan No.4 Bridge

Characteristics
- Material: Steel bar, concrete
- Total length: 1,345 metres (4,413 ft)
- Width: 27 metres (89 ft)
- Traversable?: Yes
- Longest span: 400-metre (1,300 ft)

History
- Construction start: July 1, 2004
- Construction end: October 31, 2006
- Opened: 12 July 2007
- Inaugurated: 12 July 2007

Chinese name
- Simplified Chinese: 莲城大桥
- Traditional Chinese: 蓮城大橋
Transcriptions
Standard Mandarin
- Hanyu Pinyin: Liánchéng Dàqiáo

Alternative Chinese name
- Simplified Chinese: 湘潭四桥
- Traditional Chinese: 湘潭四橋
Transcriptions
Standard Mandarin
- Hanyu Pinyin: Xiāngtán Sìqiáo

Location
- Interactive map of Liancheng Bridge

Liancheng Bridge (Chinese: 莲城大桥) is a cross-border bridge linking Yuhu District and Yuetang District over the Xiang River in Xiangtan, Hunan, China. The Liancheng Bridge is 1,340.86 metres (4,399.1 ft) long and 27 metres (89 ft) wide. The bridge deck is a two-way four lane urban trunk road.

== History ==
Construction began on July 1, 2004, and at that time it was named "Xiangtan No.4 Bridge". It was renamed "Liancheng Bridge" in June 2006. It was completed on October 31, 2006, and cost more than 452.1 million yuan. It opened to traffic on July 12, 2007. On June 1, 2016, it cancelled the entry fees system.
