= Chaotianmen funicular =

Funicular railway in Chongqing, China

Chaotianmen Funicular was a funicular railway in Yuzhong District, Chongqing, People's Republic of China, on the bank of Jialing River. As the name indicates, it was in Chaotianmen, where there used to be a ferry terminal. The construction commenced in 1983, and the line opened on August 1, 1984, National day of the People's Republic of China. The funicular was being built to connect the pier with Chaotianmen Downtown.

As the Chongqing Raffles City, a complex of office buildings developed by Singaporean company Capitaland, started construction in 2007 in the Chaotianmen Area, the Funicular line permanently closed and was eventually demolished to make way for the development project.

However, in 2018, a new plan was proposed to build a new funicular line at the original location. This proposal is currently under evaluation.
