= Sinan County, Guizhou =

Sinan County 思南县 Szenan
- County
- Location of the seat in Guizhou Sinan (Southwest China)
- Coordinates (Sinan County government): 27°57′23″N 108°14′58″E
- Country: China
- Province: Guizhou
- Prefecture-level city: Tongren
- County seat: Sitang

Area
  - Total: 2,231 km^{2} (861 sq mi)

Population (2010)
  - Total: 499,398
  - Density: 223.8/km^{2} (579.8/sq mi)
- Time zone: UTC+8 (China Standard)
- Postal code: 565100

Sinan County (simplified Chinese: 思南县; traditional Chinese: 思南縣; pinyin: Sīnán Xiàn) is a county under the administration of the prefecture-level city of Tongren, in the northeast of Guizhou Province, China. The government is located in Sitang.

== Administrative divisions ==
Sinan County is divided into 3 subdistricts, 17 towns and 8 ethnic townships:

subdistricts

- Sitang Subdistrict 思唐街道
- Guanzhongba Subdistrict 关中坝街道
- Shuangtang Subdistrict 双塘街道

towns

- Tangtou Town 塘头镇
- Xujiaba Town 许家坝镇
- Dabachang Town 大坝场镇
- Wenjiadian Town 文家店镇
- Yingwuxi Town 鹦鹉溪镇
- Hepengxi Town 合朋溪镇
- Zhangjiazhai Town 张家寨镇
- Sunjiaba Town 孙家坝镇
- Qinggangpo Town 青杠坡镇
- Wengxi Town 瓮溪镇
- Liangshuijing Town 凉水井镇
- Shaojiaqiao Town 邵家桥镇
- Changba Town 长坝镇
- Banqiao Town 板桥镇
- Daheba Town 大河坝镇
- Xiangba Town 香坝镇
- Tingziba Town 亭子坝镇

ethnic townships

- Silin Tujia and Miao Ethnic Township 思林土家族苗族乡
- Hujiawan Miao and Tujia Ethnic Township 胡家湾苗族土家族乡
- Kuanping Tujia and Miao Ethnic Township 宽坪土家族苗族乡
- Fengyun Tujia and Miao Ethnic Township 枫芸土家族苗族乡
- Sandao Tujia and Miao Ethnic Township 三道水土家族苗族乡
- Tianqiao Tujia and Miao Ethnic Township 天桥土家族苗族乡
- Xinglong Tujia and Miao Ethnic Township 兴隆土家族苗族乡
- Yangjia'ao Miao and Tujia Ethnic Township 杨家坳苗族土家族乡

== Climate ==
Climate data for Sinan, elevation 417 m (1,368 ft), (1991–2020 normals, extremes 1981–2010)
Month	Jan	Feb	Mar	Apr	May	Jun	Jul	Aug	Sep	Oct	Nov	Dec	Year
Record high °C (°F)	26.1 (79.0)	31.4 (88.5)	34.8 (94.6)	35.1 (95.2)	37.2 (99.0)	37.5 (99.5)	39.2 (102.6)	39.9 (103.8)	38.5 (101.3)	34.5 (94.1)	29.9 (85.8)	23.5 (74.3)	39.9 (103.8)
Mean daily maximum °C (°F)	9.4 (48.9)	12.3 (54.1)	17.0 (62.6)	22.8 (73.0)	26.7 (80.1)	29.3 (84.7)	32.7 (90.9)	32.9 (91.2)	29.0 (84.2)	22.6 (72.7)	17.5 (63.5)	11.7 (53.1)	22.0 (71.6)
Daily mean °C (°F)	6.5 (43.7)	8.7 (47.7)	12.6 (54.7)	17.8 (64.0)	21.7 (71.1)	24.8 (76.6)	27.6 (81.7)	27.3 (81.1)	23.9 (75.0)	18.4 (65.1)	13.6 (56.5)	8.6 (47.5)	17.6 (63.7)
Mean daily minimum °C (°F)	4.6 (40.3)	6.4 (43.5)	9.8 (49.6)	14.6 (58.3)	18.3 (64.9)	21.6 (70.9)	23.9 (75.0)	23.5 (74.3)	20.5 (68.9)	15.9 (60.6)	11.3 (52.3)	6.6 (43.9)	14.8 (58.5)
Record low °C (°F)	−2.7 (27.1)	−1.4 (29.5)	0.5 (32.9)	5.5 (41.9)	10.4 (50.7)	14.1 (57.4)	17.7 (63.9)	18.0 (64.4)	12.6 (54.7)	7.6 (45.7)	0.7 (33.3)	−1.9 (28.6)	−2.7 (27.1)
Average precipitation mm (inches)	27.4 (1.08)	25.5 (1.00)	49.9 (1.96)	110.4 (4.35)	157.1 (6.19)	200.5 (7.89)	171.9 (6.77)	123.7 (4.87)	75.6 (2.98)	100.5 (3.96)	49.0 (1.93)	22.3 (0.88)	1,113.8 (43.86)
Average precipitation days (≥ 0.1 mm)	12.0	10.5	13.5	15.9	16.8	15.3	12.4	11.8	9.8	14.1	10.5	10.1	152.7
Average snowy days	2.8	1.3	0.3	0	0	0	0	0	0	0	0	1.0	5.4
Average relative humidity (%)	75	74	74	76	77	79	74	73	74	79	78	75	76
Mean monthly sunshine hours	27.6	37.9	63.9	83.7	98.7	94.2	168.6	178.4	125.6	75.5	60.7	39.3	1,054.1
Percentage possible sunshine	8	12	17	22	23	23	40	44	34	21	19	12	23
Source: China Meteorological Administration
