= Yong River (Zhejiang) =

River in Ningbo, China

Coordinates: 29°52′35.8″N 121°33′25.8″E

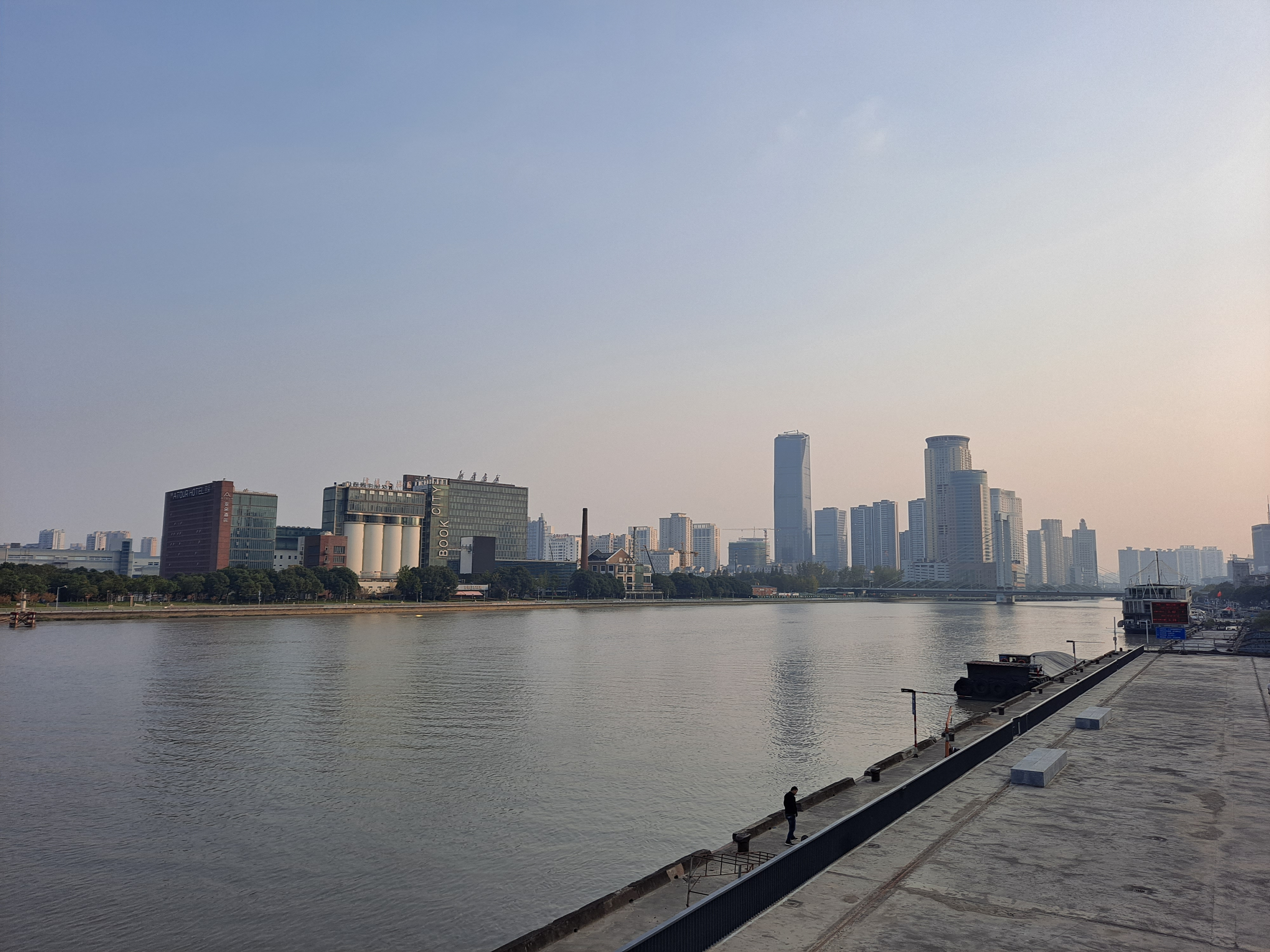
Yong River

The Yong River (Chinese: 甬江, p Yǒng Jiāng, Wu Yon Kaon) is one of the main rivers in China, located in Ningbo, Zhejiang Province.

Yong is the name of the river, and also a short name for Ningbo, the city through which it flows. The name Yong comes from the ancient name of a mountain in the area. Yong River is formed by the convergence of two rivers, namely the Fenghua River, which flows through Fenghua, Yuyao and Cixi, and the Yao River, which passes through Shangyao and Siming Mountains. It empties into the East China Sea in Zhenhai District, Ningbo.

== See also ==
- Yong River (邕江) in Guangxi
