= Pingnan County, Guangxi =

Pingnan County 平南县 · Bingznanz Yen Pingnam
- County
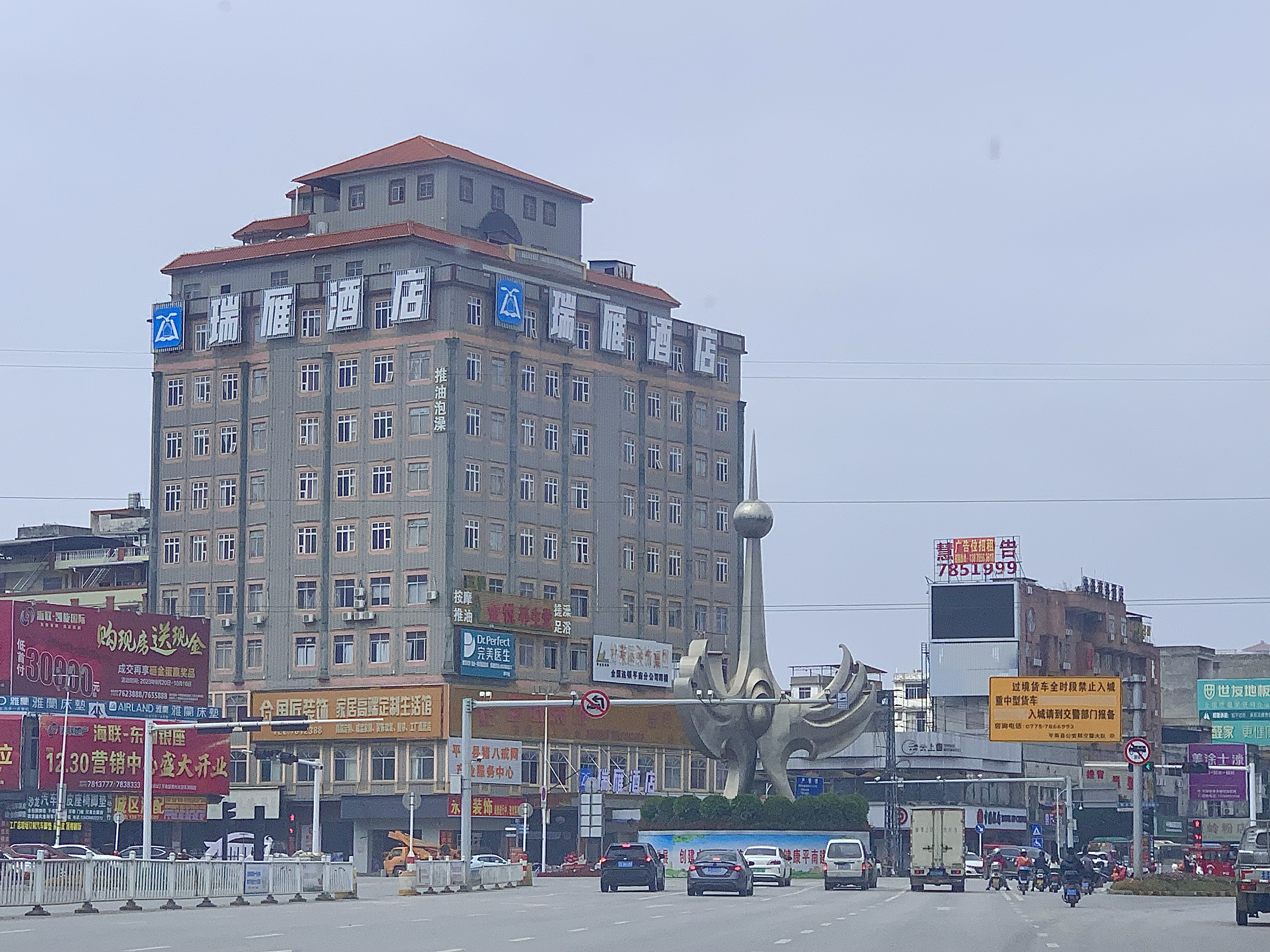

- Location of the seat in Guangxi
- Coordinates: 23°32′20″N 110°23′31″E
- Country: China
- Region: Guangxi
- Prefecture-level city: Guigang
- County seat: Pingnan Subdistrict

Area
  - Total: 2,989 km^{2} (1,154 sq mi)

Population (2002)
  - Total: 520,000
  - Density: 170/km^{2} (450/sq mi)
- Time zone: UTC+8 (China Standard)

Pingnan (Chinese: 平南; pinyin: Píngnán; Zhuang: Bingznanz) is a county in the east of Guangxi, China. It is both the easternmost and northernmost county-level division of the prefecture-level city of Guigang, with a population (as of 2002) of 520,000 residing in an area of 2,989 km^{2} (1,154 sq mi).

== Administrative divisions ==
Pingnan County is divided into 2 subdistricts, 16 towns, 1 township and 2 ethnic townships:

subdistricts

- Pingnan Subdistrict 平南街道
- Shangdu Subdistrict 上渡街道

towns

- Pingshan Town 平山镇
- Simian Town 寺面镇
- Liuchen Town 六陈镇
- Daxin Town 大新镇
- Da'an Town 大安镇
- Wulin Town 武林镇
- Dapo Town 大坡镇
- Dazhou Town 大洲镇
- Zhenlong Town 镇隆镇
- Anhuai Town 安怀镇
- Danzhu Town 丹竹镇
- Guancheng Town 官成镇
- Siwang Town 思旺镇
- Dapeng Town 大鹏镇
- Tonghe Town 同和镇
- Donghua Town 东华镇

township

- Sijie Township 思界乡

ethnic townships

- Guo'an Yao Ethnic Township 国安瑶族乡
- Malian Yao Ethnic Township 马练瑶族乡

== Climate ==
Climate data for Pingnan, elevation 83 m (272 ft), (1991–2020 normals, extremes 1981–present)
Month	Jan	Feb	Mar	Apr	May	Jun	Jul	Aug	Sep	Oct	Nov	Dec	Year
Record high °C (°F)	28.9 (84.0)	33.4 (92.1)	33.5 (92.3)	35.0 (95.0)	36.0 (96.8)	37.9 (100.2)	39.4 (102.9)	38.8 (101.8)	38.0 (100.4)	36.9 (98.4)	33.5 (92.3)	30.7 (87.3)	39.4 (102.9)
Mean daily maximum °C (°F)	17.0 (62.6)	18.7 (65.7)	21.1 (70.0)	26.5 (79.7)	30.5 (86.9)	32.3 (90.1)	33.7 (92.7)	33.9 (93.0)	32.5 (90.5)	29.4 (84.9)	24.9 (76.8)	19.6 (67.3)	26.7 (80.0)
Daily mean °C (°F)	13.0 (55.4)	14.8 (58.6)	17.6 (63.7)	22.7 (72.9)	26.2 (79.2)	28.0 (82.4)	29.1 (84.4)	29.2 (84.6)	27.9 (82.2)	24.7 (76.5)	19.9 (67.8)	15.0 (59.0)	22.3 (72.2)
Mean daily minimum °C (°F)	10.4 (50.7)	12.2 (54.0)	15.2 (59.4)	20.0 (68.0)	23.4 (74.1)	25.3 (77.5)	26.0 (78.8)	26.0 (78.8)	24.6 (76.3)	21.2 (70.2)	16.5 (61.7)	11.7 (53.1)	19.4 (66.9)
Record low °C (°F)	1.5 (34.7)	2.1 (35.8)	2.7 (36.9)	8.6 (47.5)	14.1 (57.4)	17.9 (64.2)	21.4 (70.5)	21.3 (70.3)	15.4 (59.7)	10.1 (50.2)	5.2 (41.4)	0.1 (32.2)	0.1 (32.2)
Average precipitation mm (inches)	60.3 (2.37)	53.8 (2.12)	109.2 (4.30)	150.5 (5.93)	266.2 (10.48)	307.8 (12.12)	237.4 (9.35)	175.7 (6.92)	92.7 (3.65)	53.3 (2.10)	64.0 (2.52)	46.8 (1.84)	1,617.7 (63.7)
Average precipitation days (≥ 0.1 mm)	10.3	11.5	17.4	16.3	18.4	20.6	17.1	14.9	9.7	5.7	7.2	7.9	157
Average snowy days	0.1	0	0	0	0	0	0	0	0	0	0	0	0.1
Average relative humidity (%)	73	76	81	80	80	82	78	77	73	67	68	67	75
Mean monthly sunshine hours	81.6	64.1	53.1	83.2	134.9	147.8	202.2	205.3	189.9	189.3	151.3	131.1	1,633.8
Percentage possible sunshine	24	20	14	22	33	36	49	52	52	53	46	40	37
Source: China Meteorological Administrationall-time October record
