= Chaotianmen Bridge =

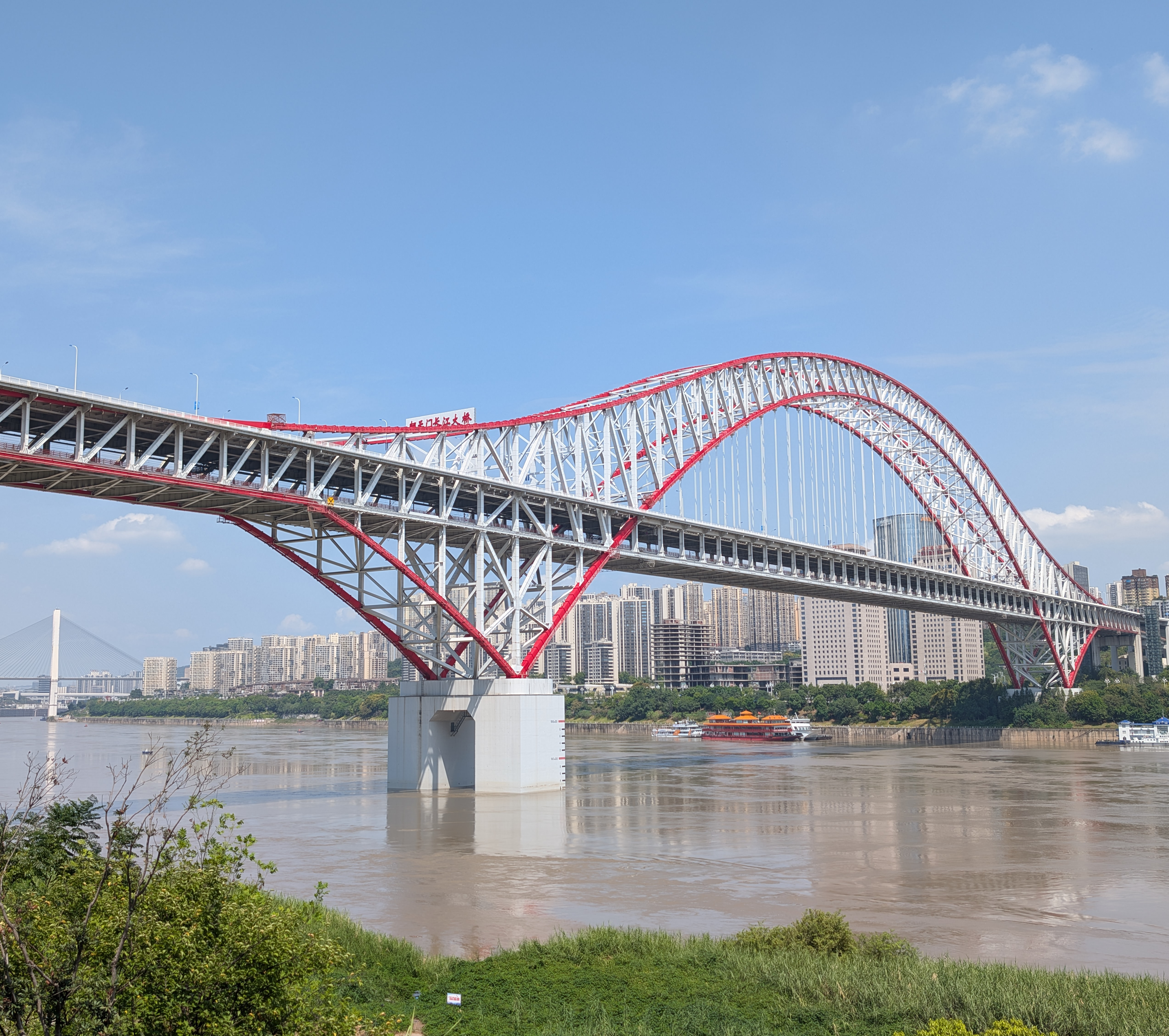
- Coordinates: 29.588871°N 106.57721°E
- Carries: Trains, Motor vehicles, Pedestrians
- Crosses: Yangtze River
- Locale: Chongqing, China

Characteristics
- Design: Through arch bridge
- Total length: 1,741 m (5,712 ft)
- Width: 36.5 m (120 ft)
- Height: 142 m (466 ft) (middle supports to arch top)
- Longest span: 552 m (1,811 ft)

History
- Construction start: December 2004
- Construction cost: 3.2 billion Yuan
- Opened: 30 April 2009

Location
- Interactive map of Chaotianmen Bridge

The Chaotianmen Bridge (simplified Chinese: 朝天门长江大桥; traditional Chinese: 朝天門長江大橋; pinyin: Cháotiān mén chángjiāng dàqiáo) is a road-rail bridge over the Yangtze River in the city of Chongqing, China. The bridge, which opened on 29 April 2009, is the world's longest through arch bridge.

The continuous steel truss arch bridge with tie girders has a height of 142 m (466 ft) from middle supports to arch top, main span of 552 m (1,811 ft) and a total length of 1,741 m (5,712 ft). It carries six lanes of traffic with a pedestrian walkway on each side on the upper deck. The lower deck has 2 traffic lanes on each side with the Chongqing Metro Loop Line running down the middle.

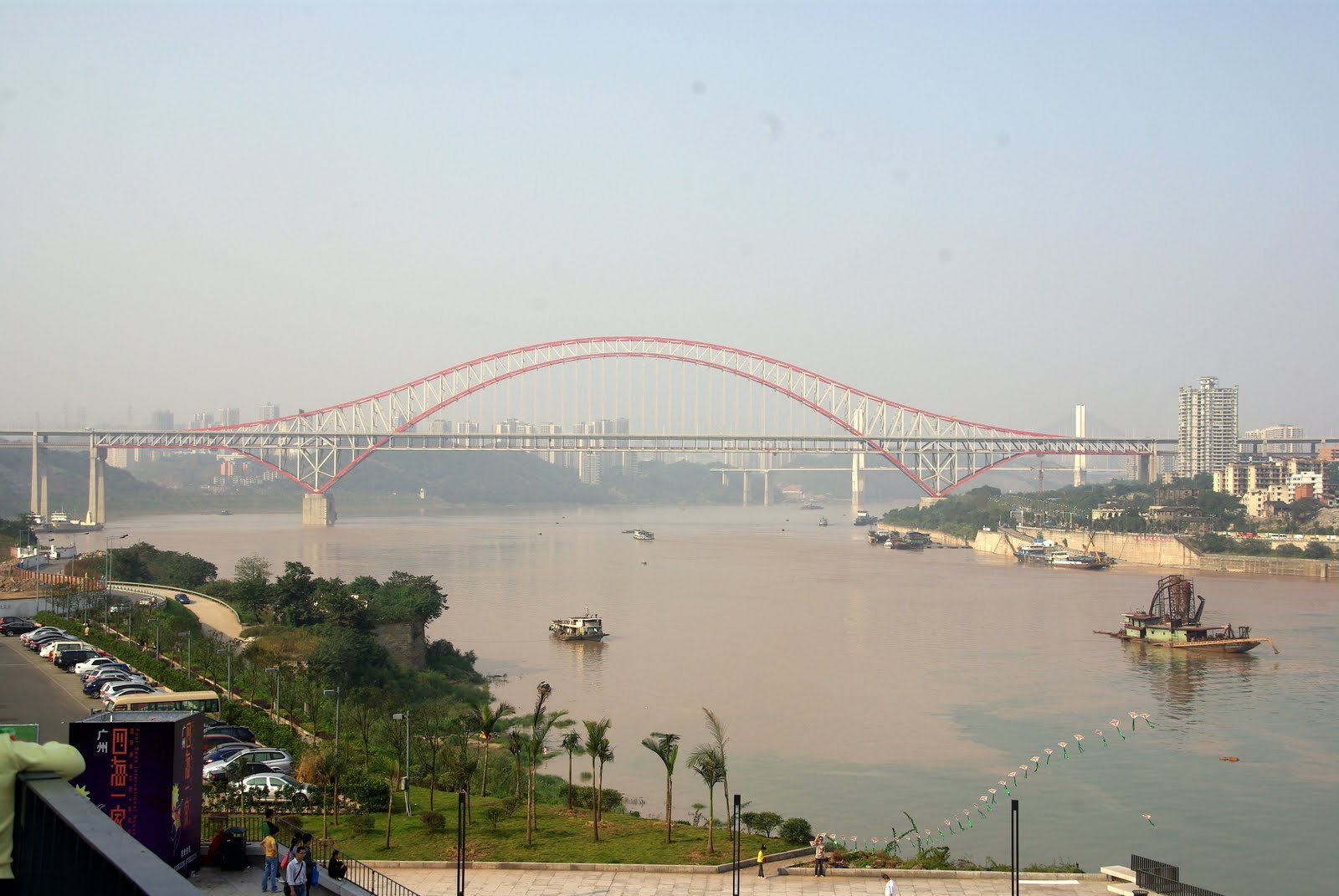

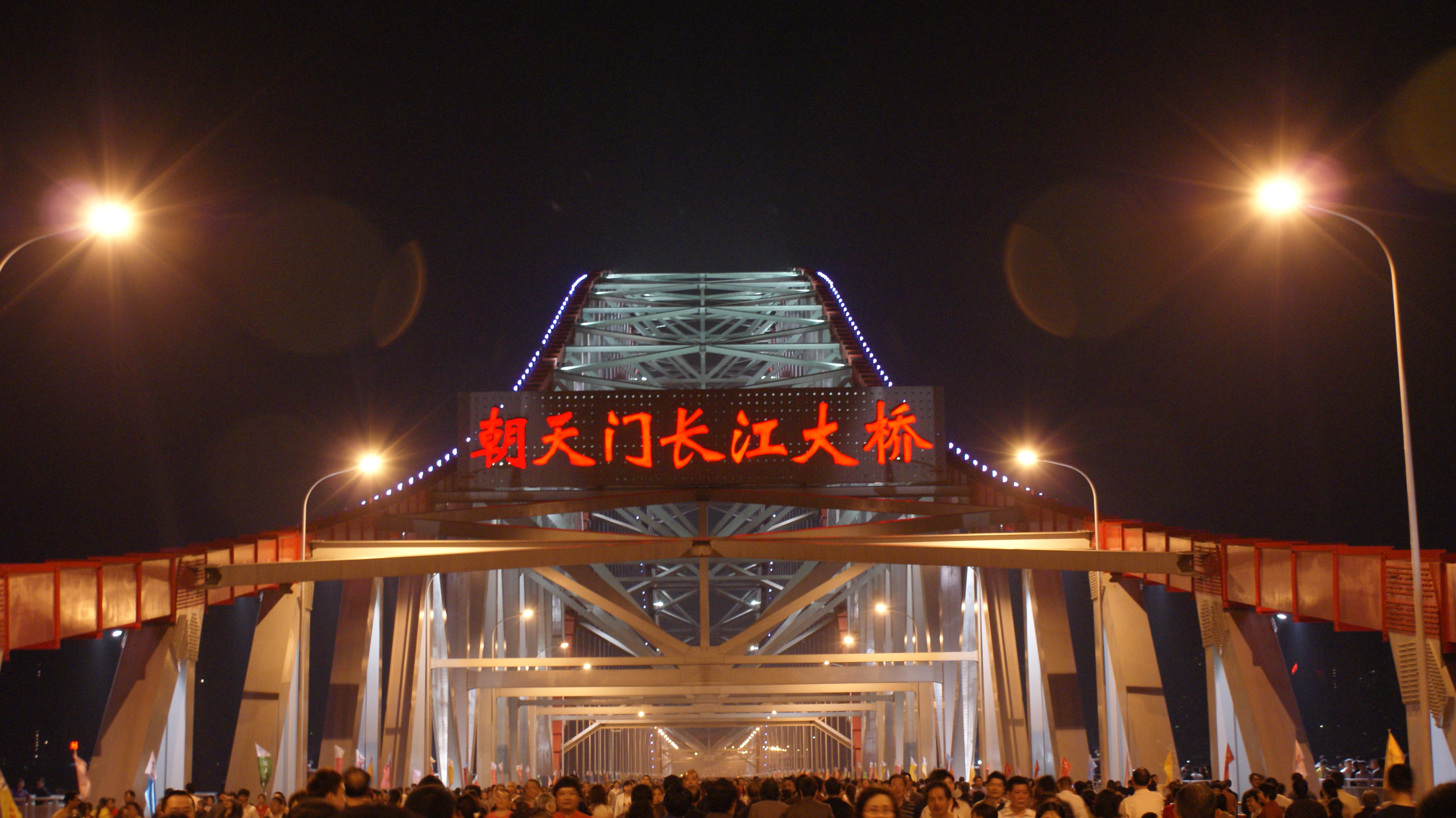

Side view diagram of the bridge with lengths in meters

A comparison of Chaotianmen Bridge with some of the most notable bridges on the same scale

== See also ==
- Bridges and tunnels across the Yangtze River
- List of bridges in China
- List of longest arch bridge spans
