= Concrete filled steel tube =

Composite material used in architecture

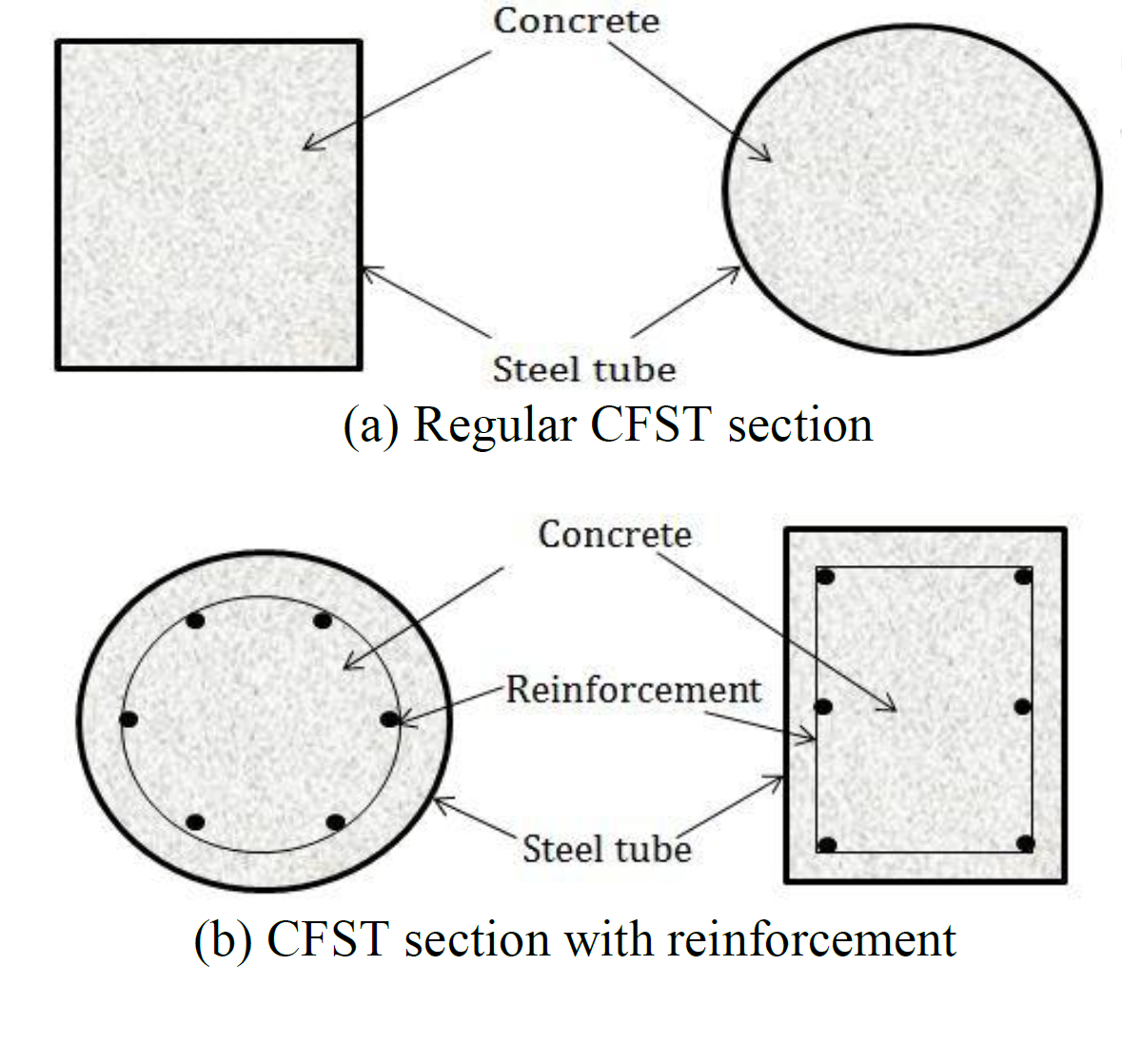
Sections of concrete filled steel tubes

Concrete filled steel tube (CFST) is a construction technique used for columns, electricity transmitting towers, and, in the 21st century, skyscrapers and arch bridges (especially the ones with a very long span). CFST is a composite material similar to reinforced concrete, except that the steel reinforcement comes not in form of a rebar embedded into concrete, but as a steel tube outside of the concrete body.

The all-way compression experienced by the concrete core inside the tube increases its bearing capacity and deformability. The latter, even when the high-strength concrete, makes the failure modes to be "quasi-plastic", greatly increasing survivability of the construction in case of an earthquake.

The pipes used can be circular or rectangular in section and might contain further reinforcement inside, or the concrete can be sandwiched between two concentric tubes in a concrete-filled double skin steel tubular (CFDST) construction.

== History ==
The CFST technique is known for more than a hundred years, but only got into wide use in the 21st century.

== Advantages ==
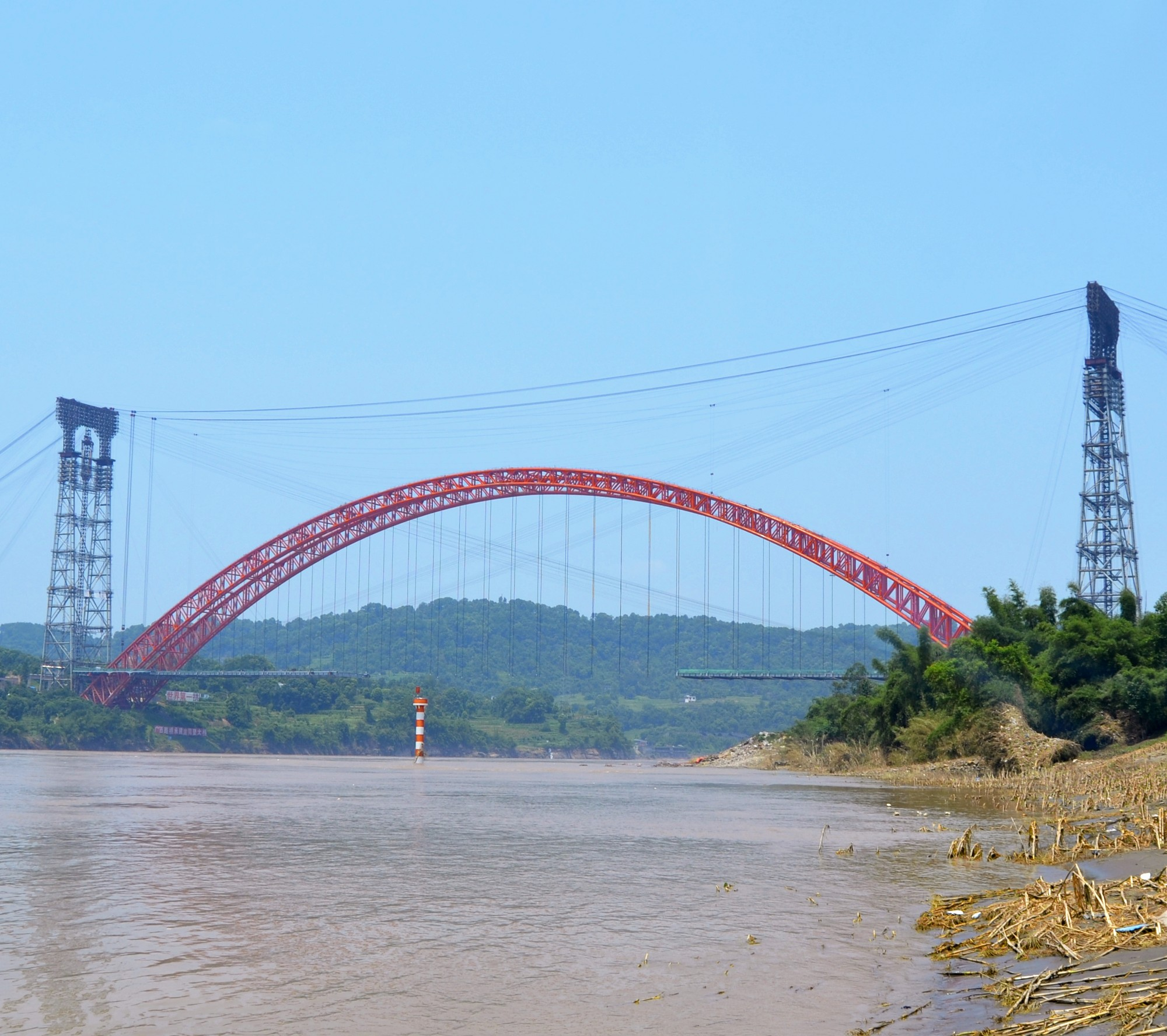
CFST bridge (Bosideng Bridge) under construction with a cable crane used for erection

The composite character of CFST provides the "confinement effect" that plays on the complementary properties of steel and concrete. On one hand, the steel tubes without filling are prone to failure due to local defects, forcing architects to overdesign the structure to accommodate the tube imperfections. Concrete filling delays local buckling, improving the overall structural safety margin. On the other hand, tube provides confinement for the concrete, thus converting the axial forces into a three-dimensional compression of the concrete thus delaying the formation of longitudinal cracks (spalling).

The main construction advantages of CFST over open concrete include:

- steel tubes can be used as formwork for concrete, lowering the cost of construction;
- the arch can be constructed without a temporary support (centring) since the welded tube structure has high stability;
- erection is less expensive due to tube being relatively lightweight, allowing the use, for example, of cable cranes or balanced cantilever method;
- excellent compression, bending, and torsion strength;
- lower drag coefficients;
- smaller area to paint;
- better aesthetics;
- ability to fill voids if discovered later.

== Disadvantages ==
The confinement effect ("hooped compression") might decrease at the operational loads due to Poisson's ratio being lower in concrete than in steel, causing the tube to break away from the concrete filler under load.

Making a beam-to-column connection is complicated.

== Bridges ==
The first CFST arch bridges were built in the USSR in the 1930s, but the method was abandoned after construction of two bridges due to inability of the designers to exploit the advantages of the new material.

Since 1990, the CFST technique got very popular in China, with more than 400 bridges built by 2017, with the maximum span increasing from 100 to 500 meters.

The erection of the CFST bridges in China utilizes three methods of construction:

- Cable-stayed fastening-hanging cantilever assembly is used for the majority of CFST bridges
- Rotation construction
- Large-segment lifting construction

== Standards ==
CFST use is allowed by multiple construction codes:

- Japanese code AIJ (since 1997);
- American AISC (2005);
- British bridge code BS 5400 (2005);
- Chinese code DBJ13-51 (2003);
- Eurocode 4 (2004);
- Australian bridge design standard AS5100 (2004).

== Sources ==
- Alostaz, Yousef Mohammed (1996). Connections to concrete-filled steel tubes (PDF) (Doctor of Philosophy in Civil Engineering thesis). University of Illinois at Urbana-Champaign.
- Han, Lin-Hai; Li, Yong-Jin; Liao, Fei-Yu (2011). "Concrete-filled double skin steel tubular (CFDST) columns subjected to long-term sustained loading". Thin-Walled Structures. 49 (12): 1534–1543. doi:10.1016/j.tws.2011.08.001.
- Han, Lin-Hai (2023-10-19). Theory of Concrete-Filled Steel Tubular Structures. Springer Nature. ISBN 978-981-99-2170-6.
- Krishan, A.L.; Troshkina, E.A.; Chernyshova, E.P. (2016). "Efficient Design of Concrete Filled Steel Tube Columns". Procedia Engineering. 150. Elsevier BV: 1709–1714. doi:10.1016/j.proeng.2016.07.159. ISSN 1877-7058.
- Zhao, Xiao-Ling; Han, Lin-Hai; Lu, Hui (2010-07-27). Concrete-filled Tubular Members and Connections. CRC Press. ISBN 978-1-4822-6608-5.
- Zheng, Jielian; Wang, Jianjun (2018). "Concrete-Filled Steel Tube Arch Bridges in China". Engineering. 4 (1): 143–155. doi:10.1016/j.eng.2017.12.003.
