= Moon bridge =

Highly-rounded arched pedestrian bridge associated with gardens in China and Japan

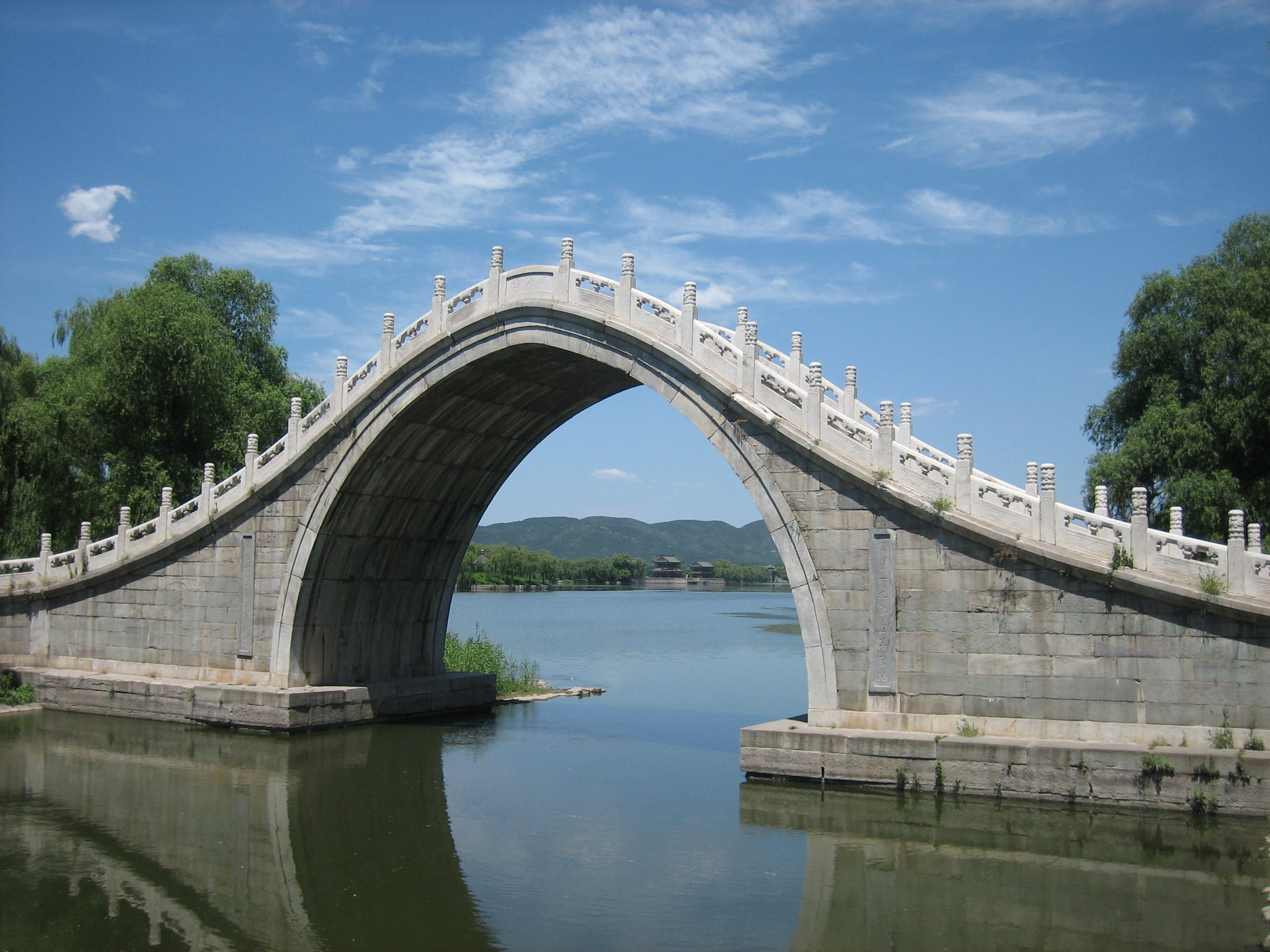
- Jade Belt Bridge at the Summer Palace, Beijing
- Material: Stone, brick, and wood

A moon bridge (Chinese: 月桥; pinyin: yuèqiáo), also known as sori-bashi (反り橋) in Japanese, or as a drum bridge (太鼓橋, taiko-bashi), is a highly arched pedestrian bridge. The moon bridge originated in China and became synonymous with Chinese gardens. However, the general shape of this bridge can be seen throughout East Asian cultures, in particular Japan.

Generally, these bridges are non-functional, serving as ornamentation. However, they were originally designed to allow pedestrians to cross canals while allowing the passage of barges beneath. To achieve this height in normal bridge construction, significant space from the river banks must be used for the approaches of the bridge. The climbing ascent and descent of the moon bridge has the advantage of conserving this space. These approaches can be very steep on moon bridges, sometimes requiring ladder-like rungs to be affixed to the bridge.

Moon bridges can be constructed from a variety of materials and construction techniques. Some wooden moon bridges employ a "woven-arch" style: cross beams are threaded between the longitudinal members, developing inherent stiffness and shape. Though rare, this technique is displayed on the 12th-century Chinese "Rainbow Bridge", the 1913 moon bridge in the Japanese garden of the Huntington Library in California.

In formal garden design, a moon bridge is placed so that it is reflected in still water. The high arch and its reflection form a circle, symbolizing the Moon. By forming a reflected full circle, the bridge also symbolizes purity: the Chinese words for "full" and "circle" together translate to "perfection".

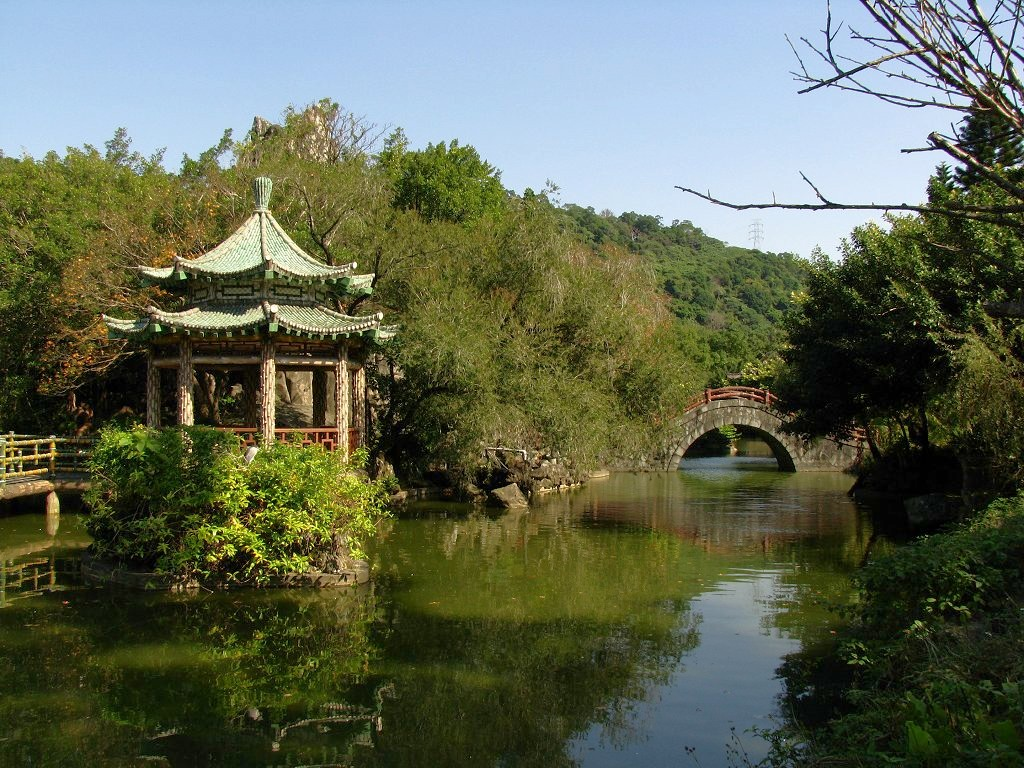
Shuangxi Park and Chinese Garden Taipei

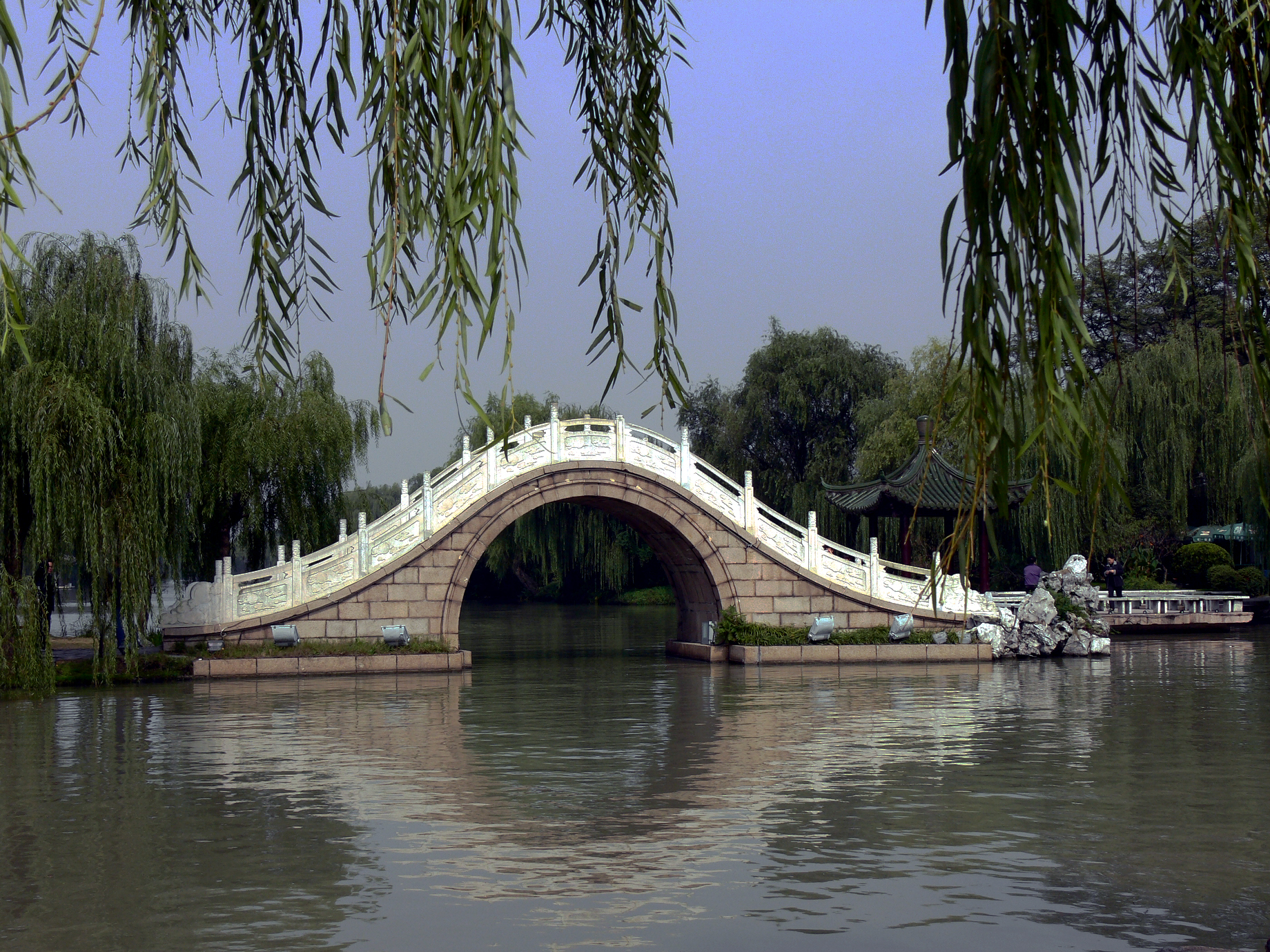
Twenty four bridge in Yangzhou, Jiangsu Province

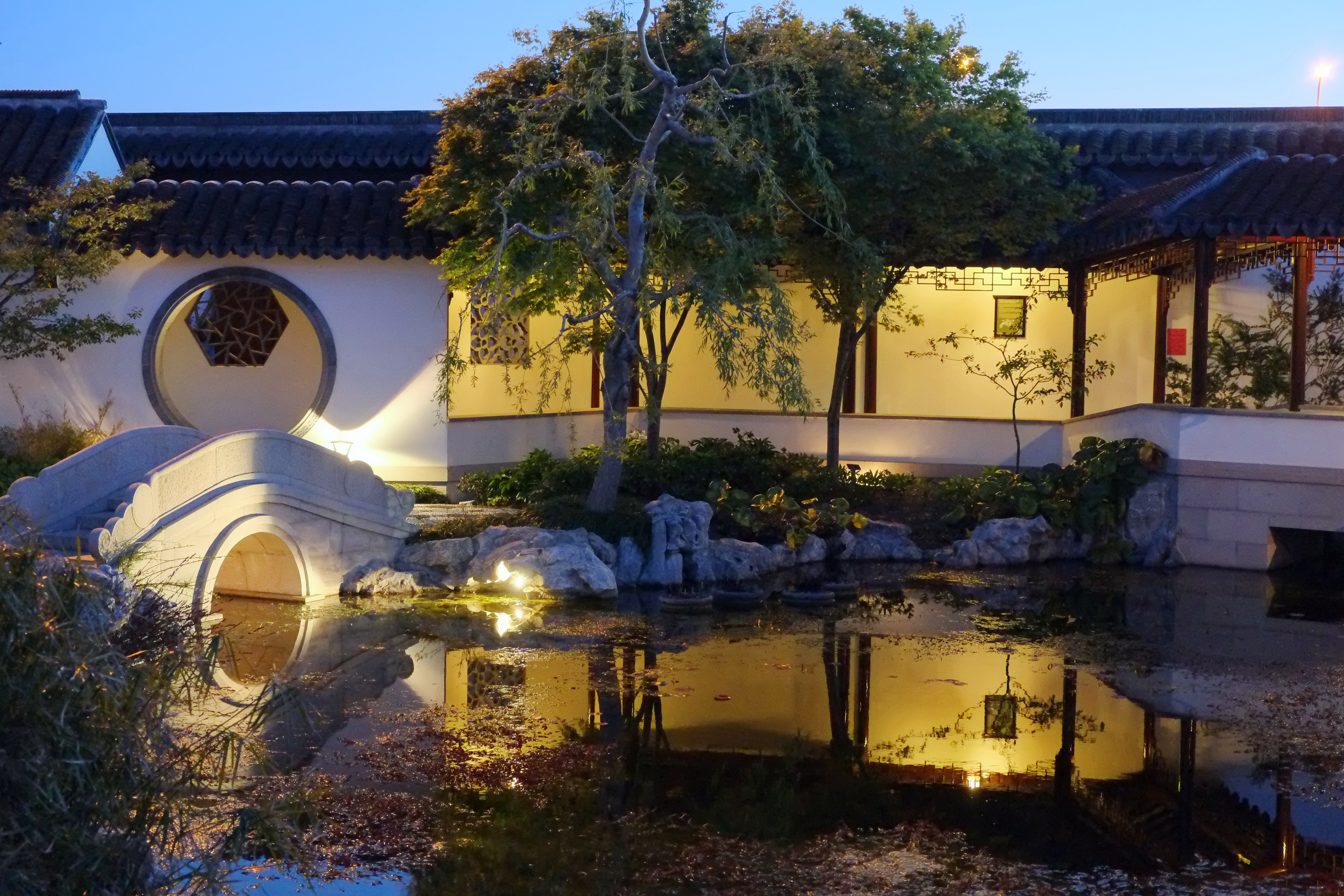
Bridge reflecting in the lake in the evening (Dunedin Chinese Garden)

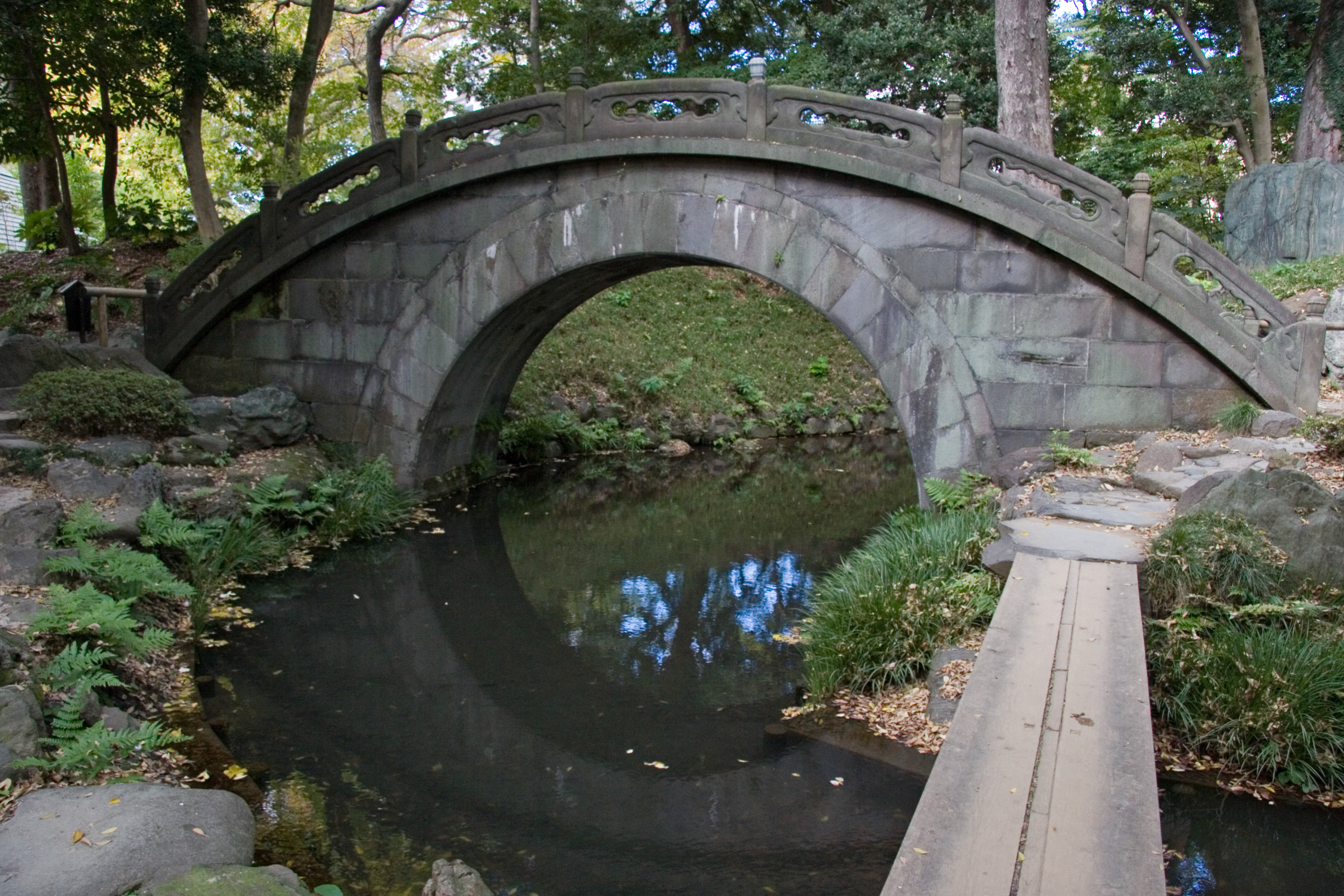
A full circle forms due to the shape and reflection of Engetsu-kyō stone bridge at Koishikawa-Kōrakuen in Tokyo, Japan

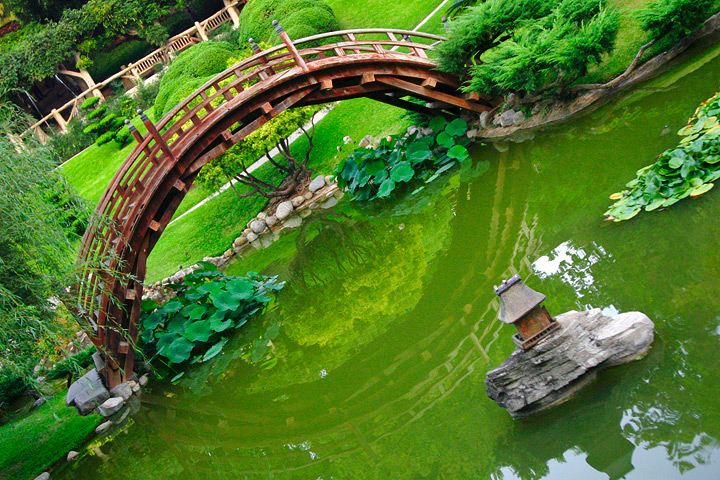
Moon bridge with a "woven-arch" construction

== See also ==
- Moon gate
- Chinese garden
