= Jade Belt Bridge =

Moon bridge in Beijing, China

Coordinates: 39°58′48.7″N 116°16′25.7″E

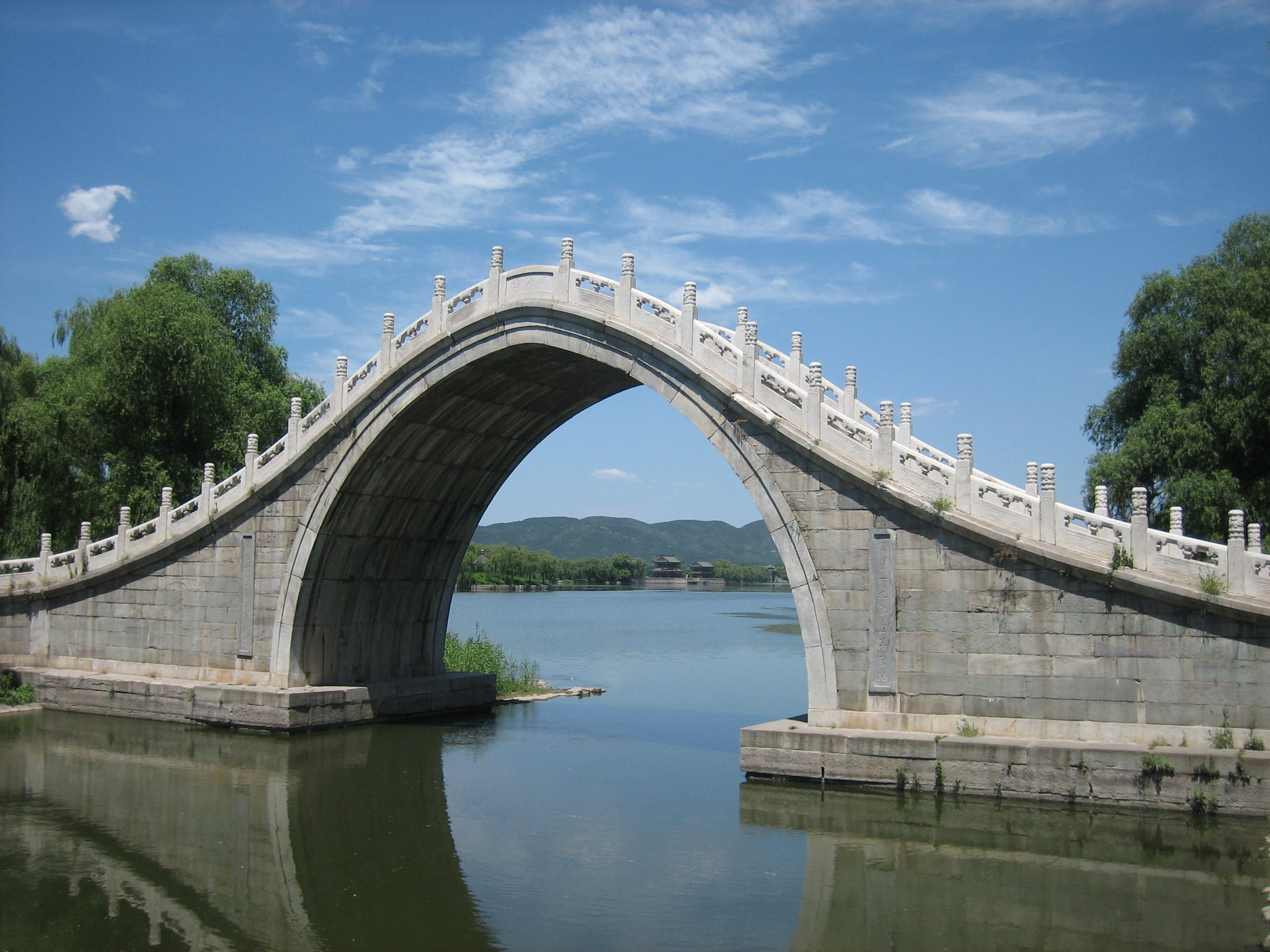
The Jade Belt Bridge

The Jade Belt Bridge (simplified Chinese: 玉带桥; traditional Chinese: 玉帶橋; pinyin: Yù Dài Qiáo), also known as the Camel's Back Bridge, is an 18th-century pedestrian moon bridge located on the grounds of the Summer Palace in Beijing, China. It is famous for its distinctive tall thin single arch.

The Jade Belt Bridge is the most well-known of the six bridges on the western shore of Kunming Lake. It was erected in the years 1750, during the reign of the Qianlong Emperor, and was built in the style of the delicate bridges in the country-side of southern China. It is made from marble and other white stone. The ornate bridge railings are decorated with carvings of cranes and other animals. The clearance of the arch was chosen to accommodate the dragon boat of the Qianlong Emperor. As the Kunming Lake inlet to the neighboring Yu River, and when during special occasions, the emperors and empress and their dragon boat would specifically pass under this bridge. It is one of the most beautiful bridges in the Summer Palace. A similar arch bridge called Xiuyi Bridge is located on the southeast of Summer Palace.

== Gallery ==
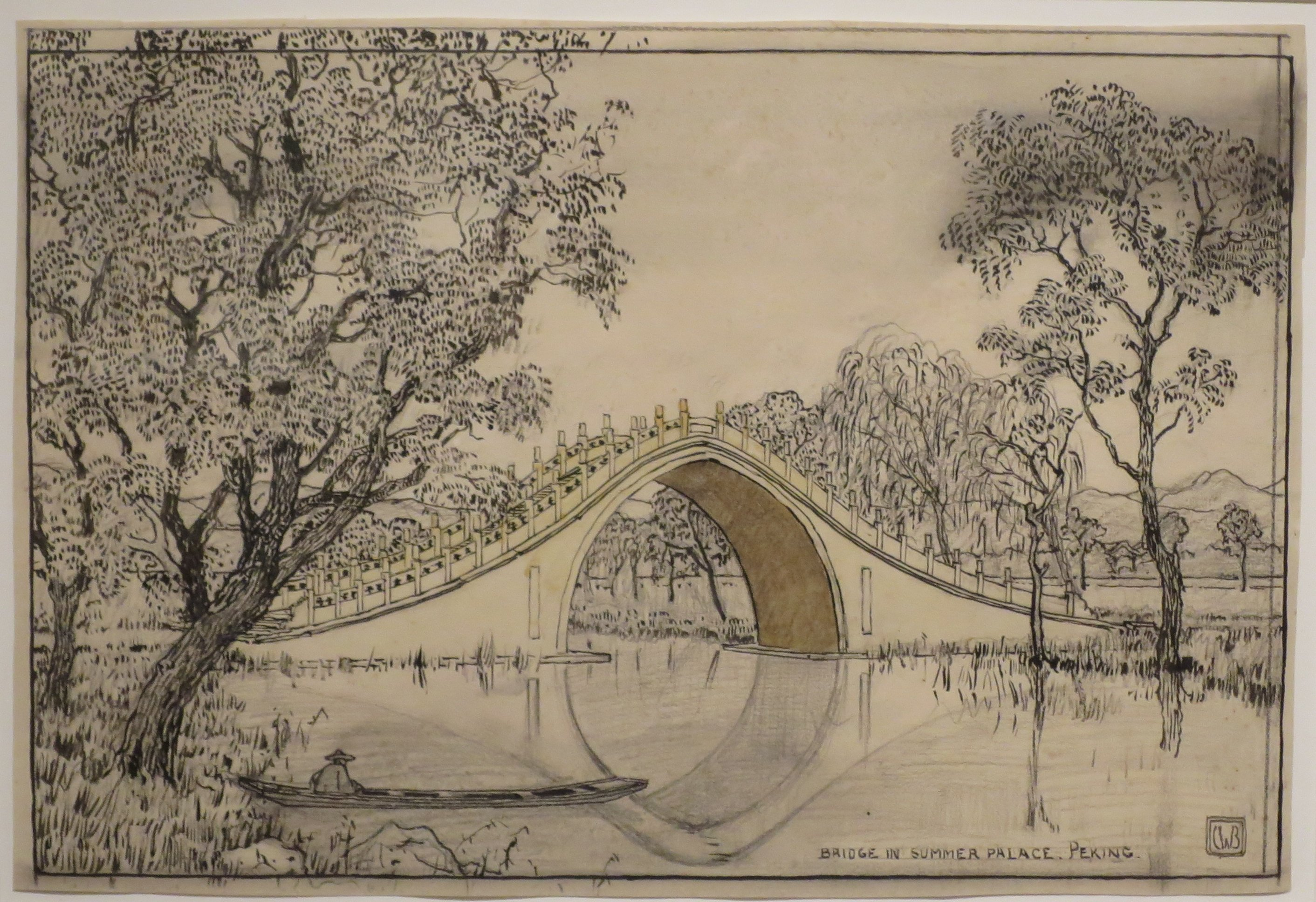
Drawing by Charles W. Bartlett

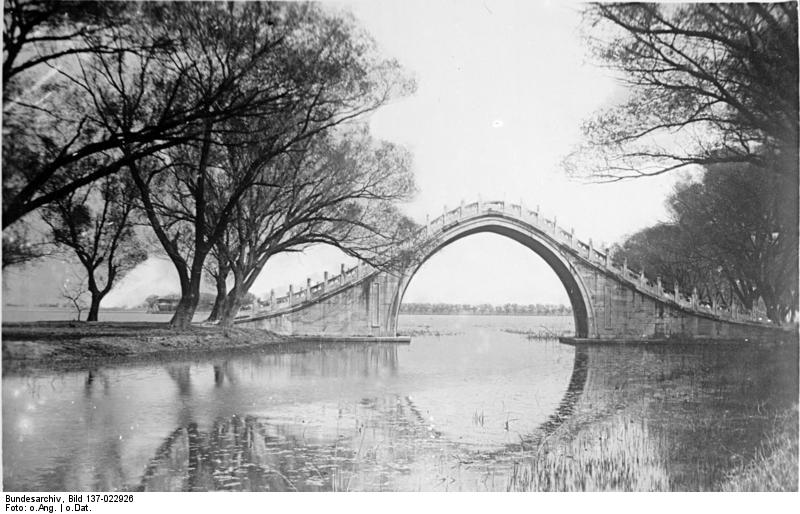

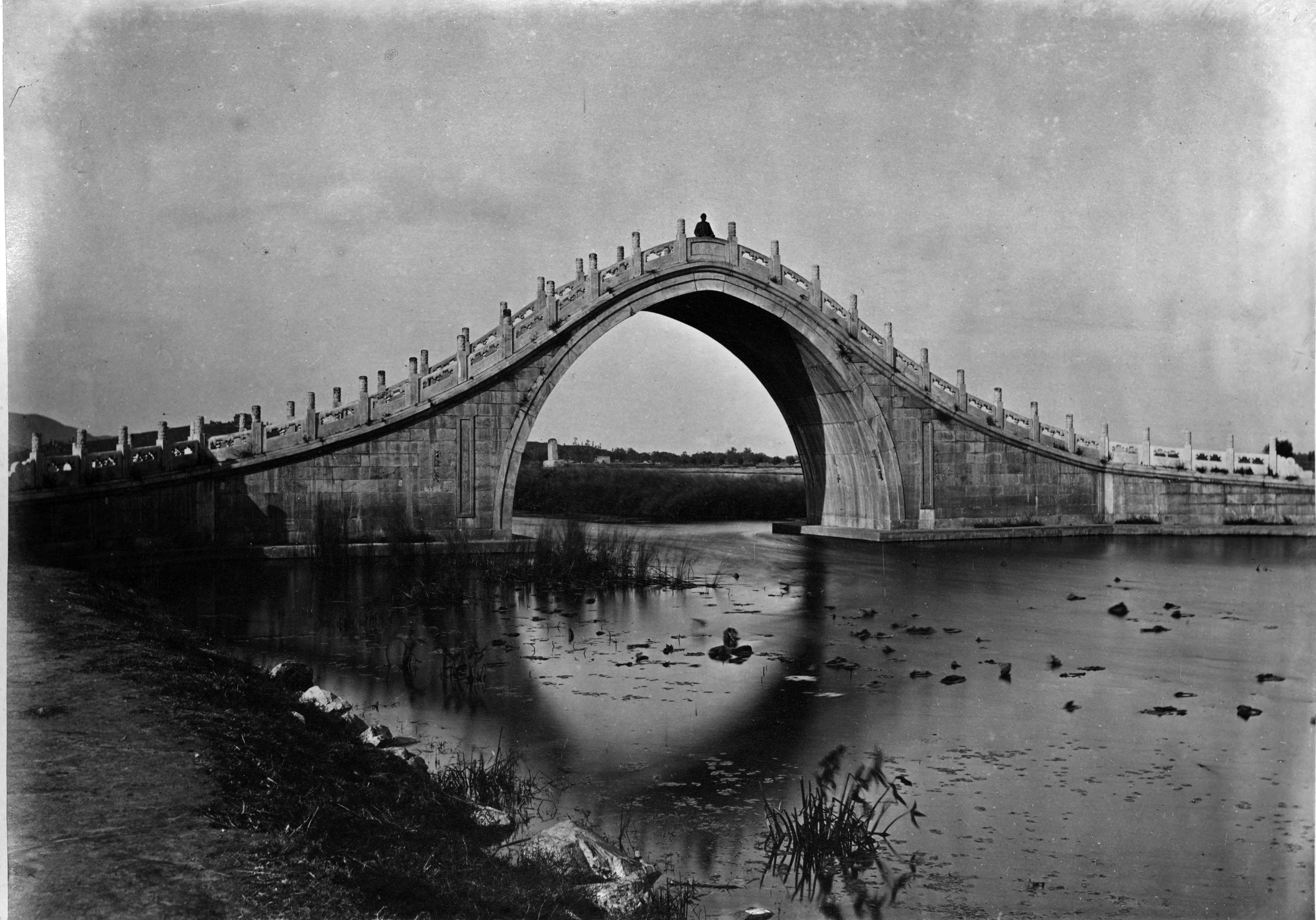
circa 1879

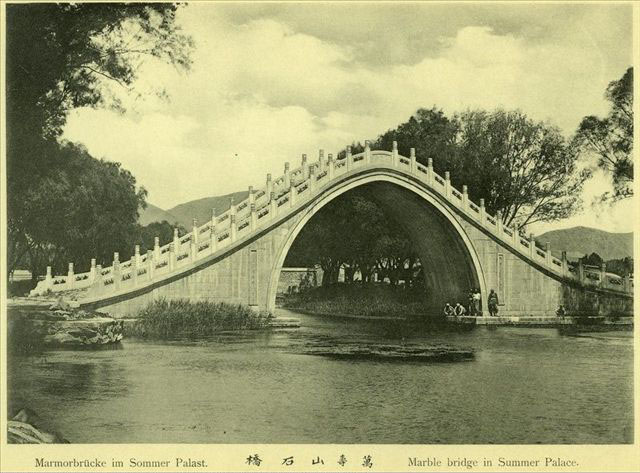
between circa 1900 and circa 1903

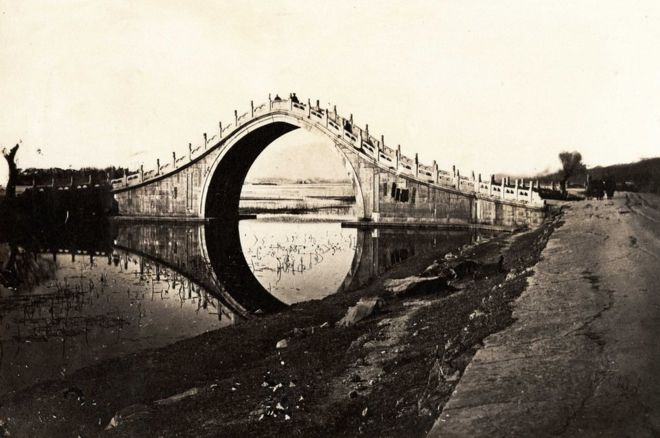
between 1870 and 1889

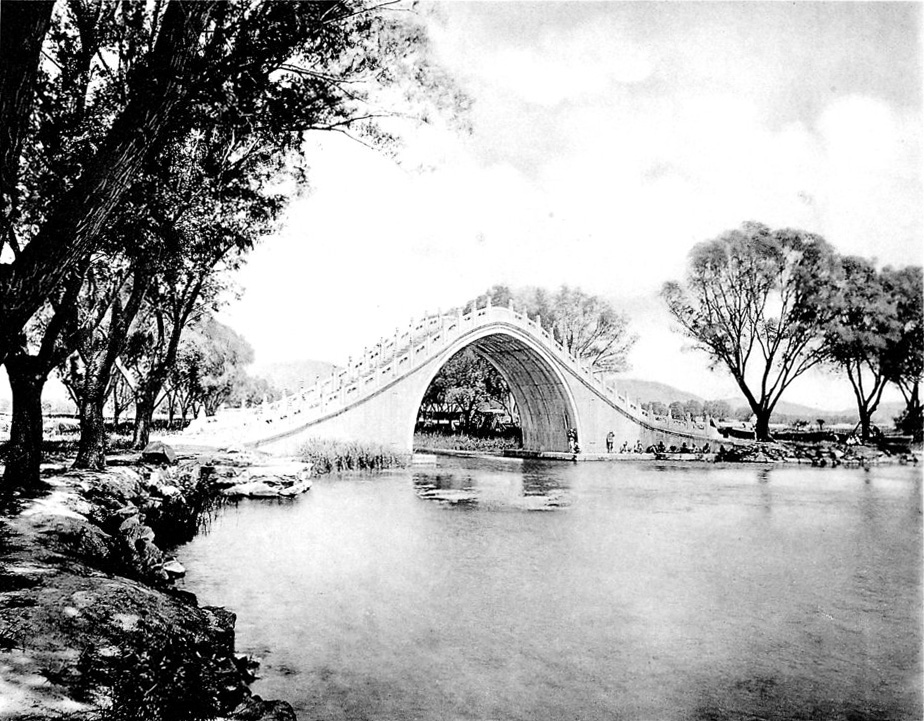
before or in 1902

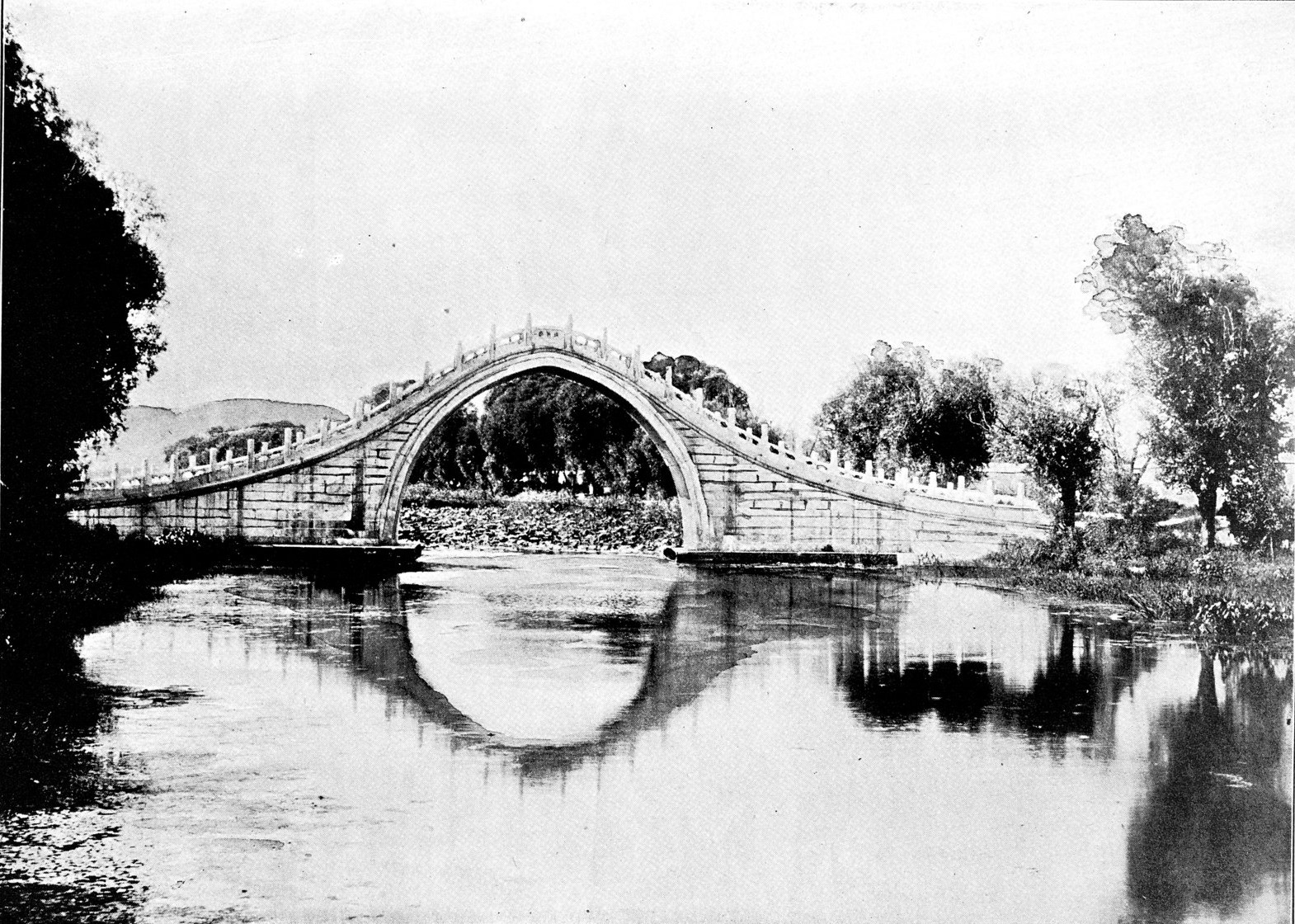
before 1906

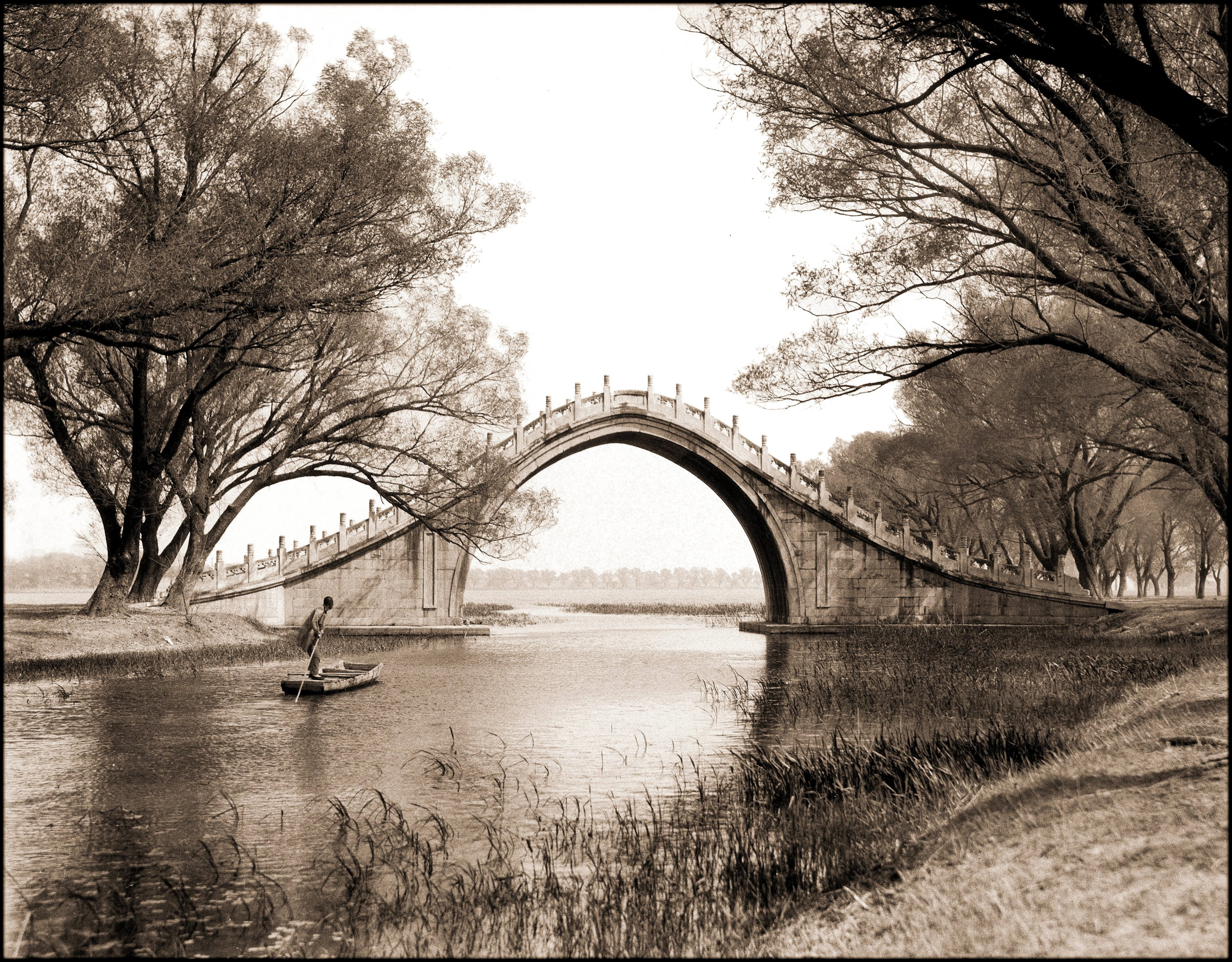
circa 1924

== Legacy ==
The modern scholar Wang Chaosheng proposed that some degraded writing on the back of a stele was actually a poem composed by the Qianlong Emperor, dated to 1755, referencing the Jade Belt Bridge of the Pictures of Tilling and Weaving that were in the original Summer Palace, then known as the Gardens of Clear Ripples (清漪園; Qingyiyuan).

To the west of Jade Belt Bridge - the Pictures of Tilling and Weaving

The silk clouds of the weavers and the rain of the plowing farmers study the methods of Wu.

The water and weather (of north and south) are pretty much the same,

Food and clothing share the same source so all must work with diligence.

== See also ==
- Precious Belt Bridge
- Chinese architecture
- Architecture of the Song dynasty
- List of bridges in China
- Ponte della Maddalena
