= Kunming Lake =

Coordinates: 39°59′30″N 116°16′20″E

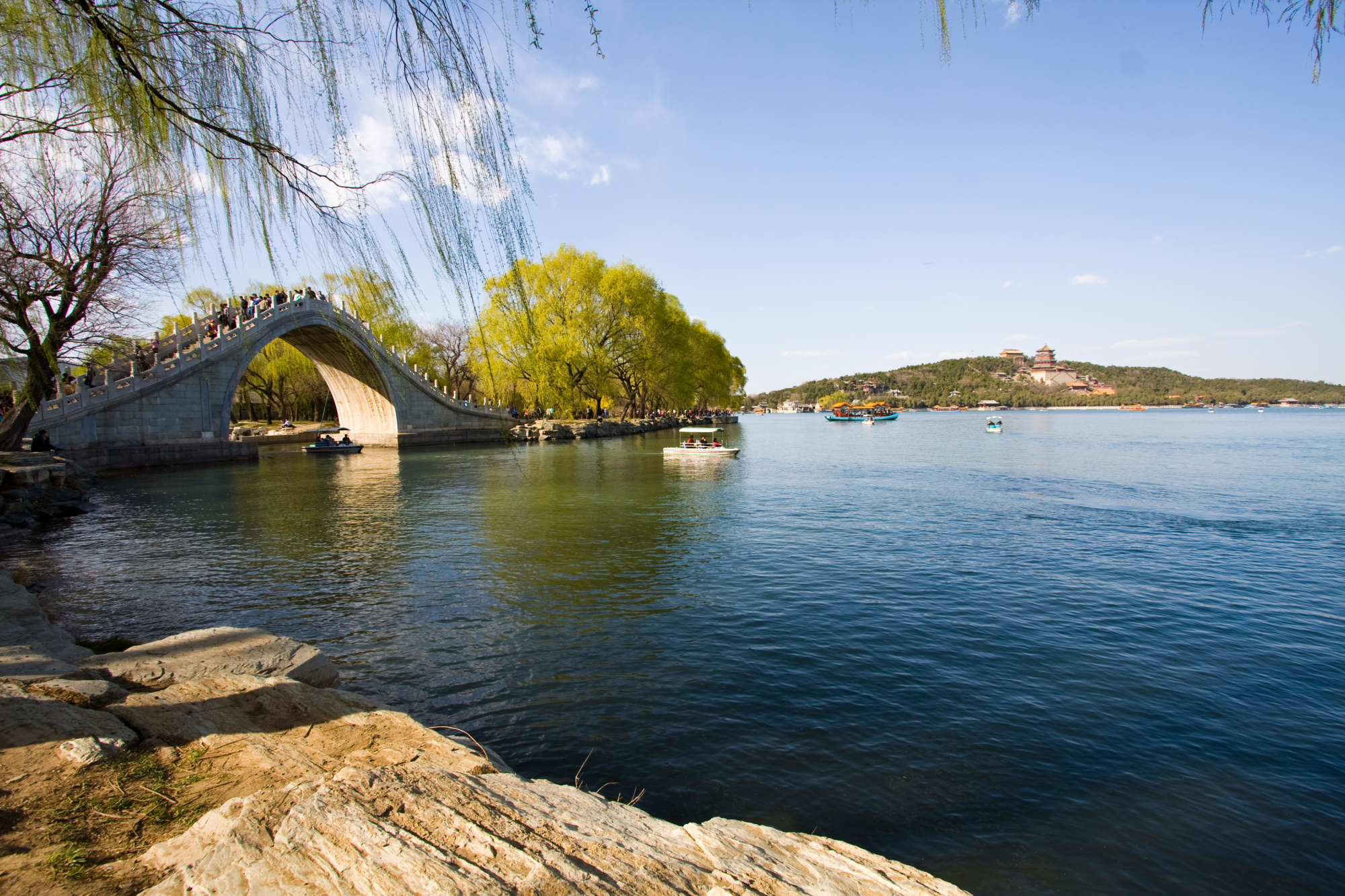
- Kunming Lake

- Location within Beijing
- Location: Summer Palace, Haidian District, Beijing
- Type: artificial lake
- Basin countries: China
- Surface area: 2.2 km^{2} (0.85 sq mi)
- Average depth: 1.5 m (4.9 ft)
- Max. depth: 3 m (9.8 ft)

Kunming Lake (Chinese: 昆明湖; pinyin: Kūnmíng Hú) is the central lake on the grounds of the Summer Palace in Haidian District, Beijing, China. Together with the Longevity Hill, Kunming Lake forms the key landscape features of the Summer Palace gardens.

With an area of 2.2 km^{2} (0.8 sq mi), Kunming Lake covers approximately three-quarters of the Summer Palace grounds. It is quite shallow, with an average depth of only 1.5 meters (5 ft).

Kunming Lake takes up about 75% of the park and contains many famous small islands and bridges, making it one of the top popular sites in the Summer Palace.

== History ==
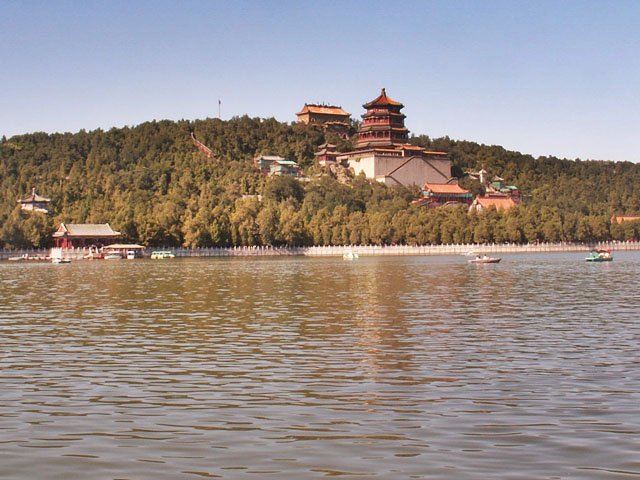
The Longevity Hill

Kunming Lake is a manmade lake whose predecessors were called Wengshan (Jar Hill) Pond and Xihu Lake. They were reservoirs which had been used as sources of water both for the city and irrigation of fields over a period of 3,500 years. Guo Shoujing, a famous astronomer and engineer in his time, developed it into a reservoir for the capital of the Yuan Dynasty in 1291. The conversion of the area into an imperial garden was commissioned by the Qianlong Emperor with the work being carried out between 1750 and 1764. In the course of creating the gardens, the lake area was extended by a workforce of almost 10,000 laborers.

In the year 1990 and 1991, the Beijing Municipal Government undertook the first dredging of the lake in 240 years. A total of 652,600 m^{3} (853,600 cu yd) of sludge were removed in the work. 205 Japanese bombs dropped during the Sino-Japanese War were also found.

== Garden design ==
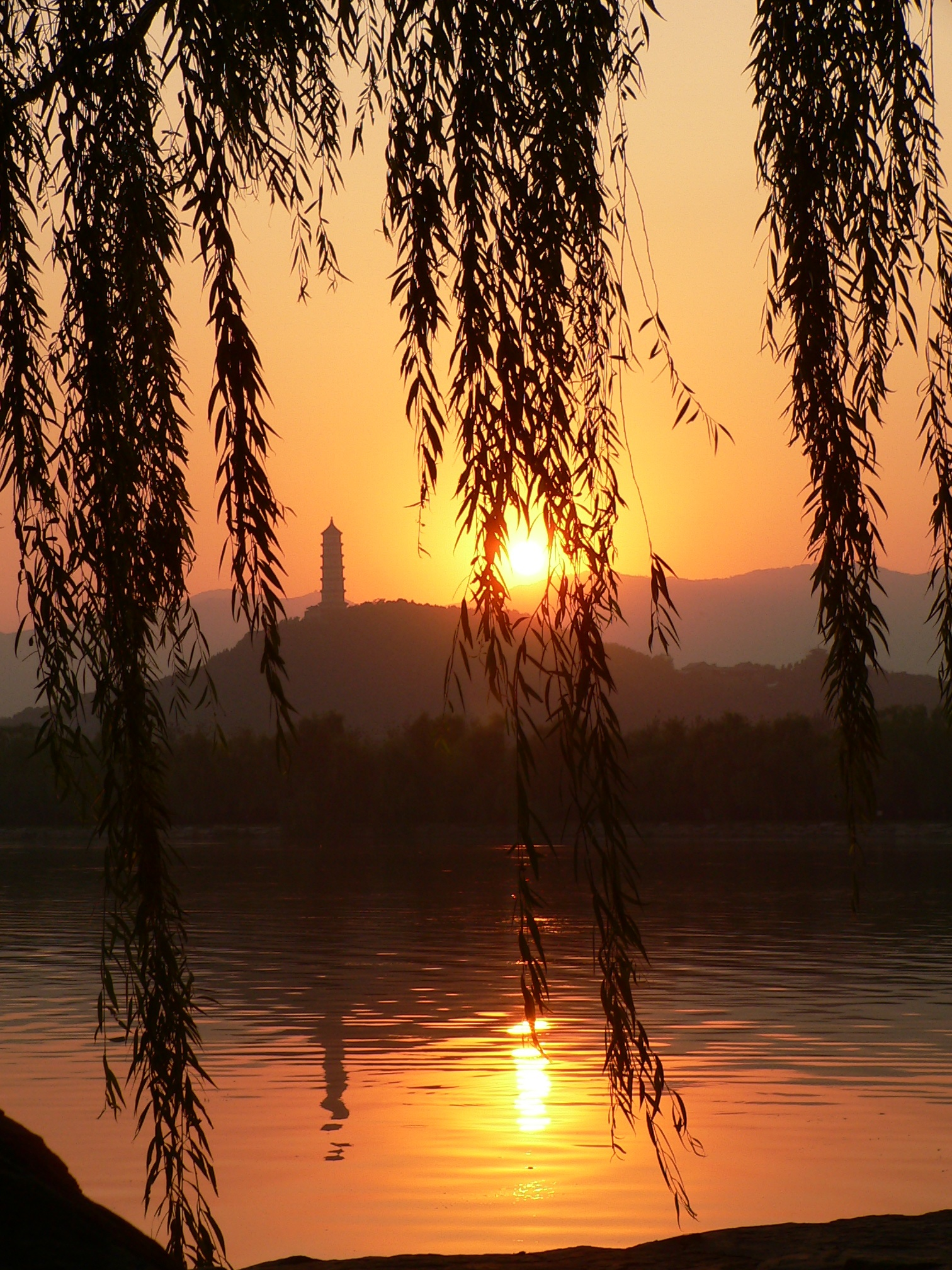
View over Kunming Lake towards Yu Quan Hill with Yu Feng Pagoda.

Kunming Lake is designed to represent the traditional Chinese gardening practice of "one pond, three hills" (一池三山). Like the islands in Hangzhou's West Lake and the Forbidden City's Taiye Lake, they were intended to represent three islands of the immortals mentioned in the Classic of Mountains and Seas: Penglai, Yingzhou, and Fangzhang. Kunming's three are named "South Lake Island" (t 南湖島, s 南湖岛, Nánhúdǎo), "Round Fort Island" (t 團城島, s 团城岛, Tuánchéngdǎo), and "Algæ-view Hall Island" (t 藻鑒堂島, s 藻鉴堂岛, Zǎojiàntángdǎo)

Many features of Kunming Lake are inspired by natural scenery from the region south of the Yangtze River. In particular, the West Dike is a recreation of the famous Sudi Dike on West Lake in Hangzhou. It cuts diagonally through the southern part of the lake. Like the Sudi Dike, the West Dike is connected through six bridges, each with its own distinctive style: Jiehu, Binfeng, Yudai, Jing, Lian, and Liu.

The largest bridge on Kunming Lake is the 17-Arch Bridge that connects the eastern shore with South Lake Island, representing Penglai. Close to the bridge on the eastern shore stands a bronze ox sculpture. According to Chinese legend, Yu the Great used an iron ox to prevent flooding. Since the bronze ox is located on the eastern dike of Kunming Lake in the direction of the Forbidden City, it was probably erected in order to protect the Forbidden City from flooding.

== Water source ==
The water source of Kunming Lake mainly comes from the recharge of springs downstream of Yuquan Mountain and groundwater. The springs within a few dozen miles northwest of Yuquan Mountain were channeled through the Baifuweng Mountain River in the Yuan Dynasty. However, the water source was obviously insufficient in 1949. In 1965, the Jingmi Diversion Canal Project was completed, opening up Kunming Lake as a new water source.

== Tourist attractions ==
=== Lake Islands ===
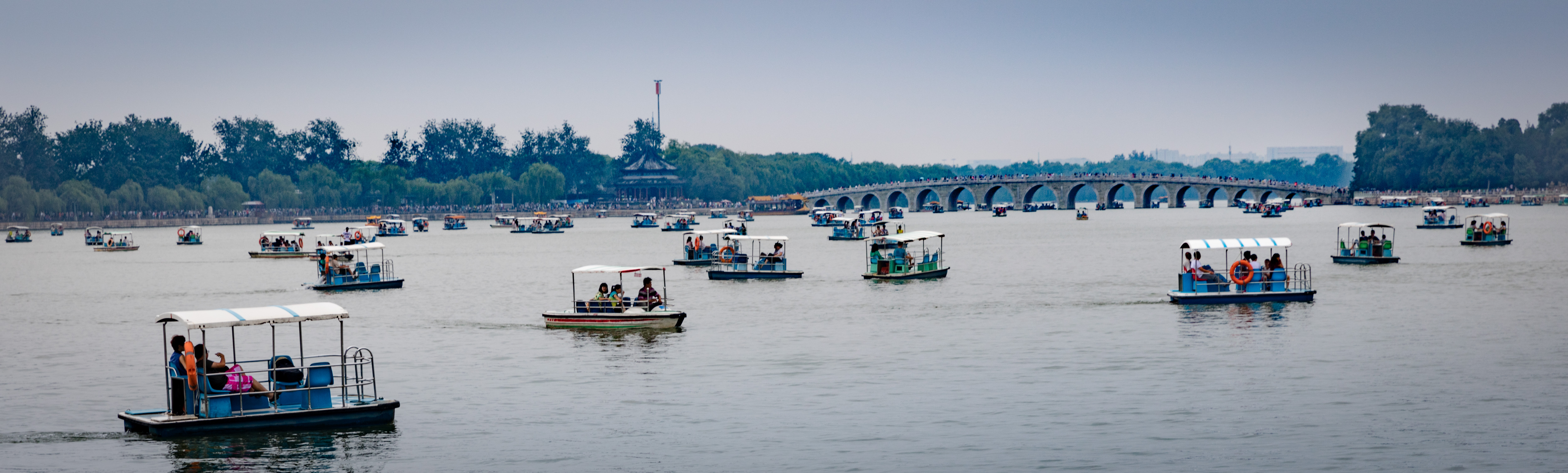
Tourists on the Kunming Lake

There are three islands in Kunming Lake. These three islands form the shape of a tripod, symbolizing a sign of immortality. This has been the norm for royal gardens since the time of Qin Shi Huang.

==== Nanhu Island ====
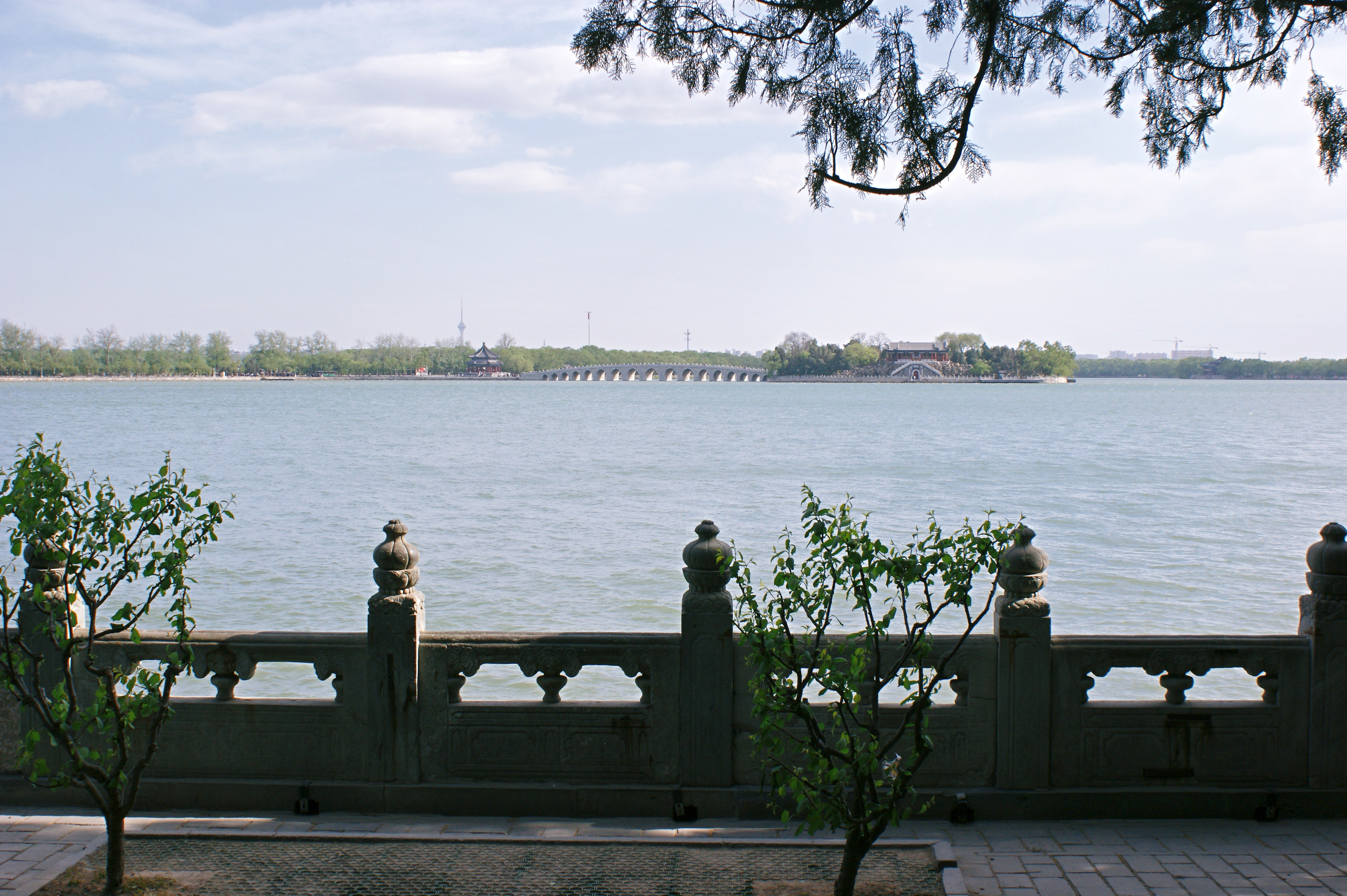
Overview of Nanhu Island in Kunming Lake

Nanhu Island located at the east side of Kunming Lake. The area is more than 10,000 square meters. A main building, Hanxu Hall, located on the north side of the island. This building was originally a three-layered pavilion imitating the Yellow Crane Tower for watching performances in the Qing Dynasty. After being burned by the British and French allied forces, the Guangxu years rebuilt a one-layer hall. Besides this, the island also contains a pier, some temples, and other smaller buildings.

==== Zhijing Pavilion Island ====
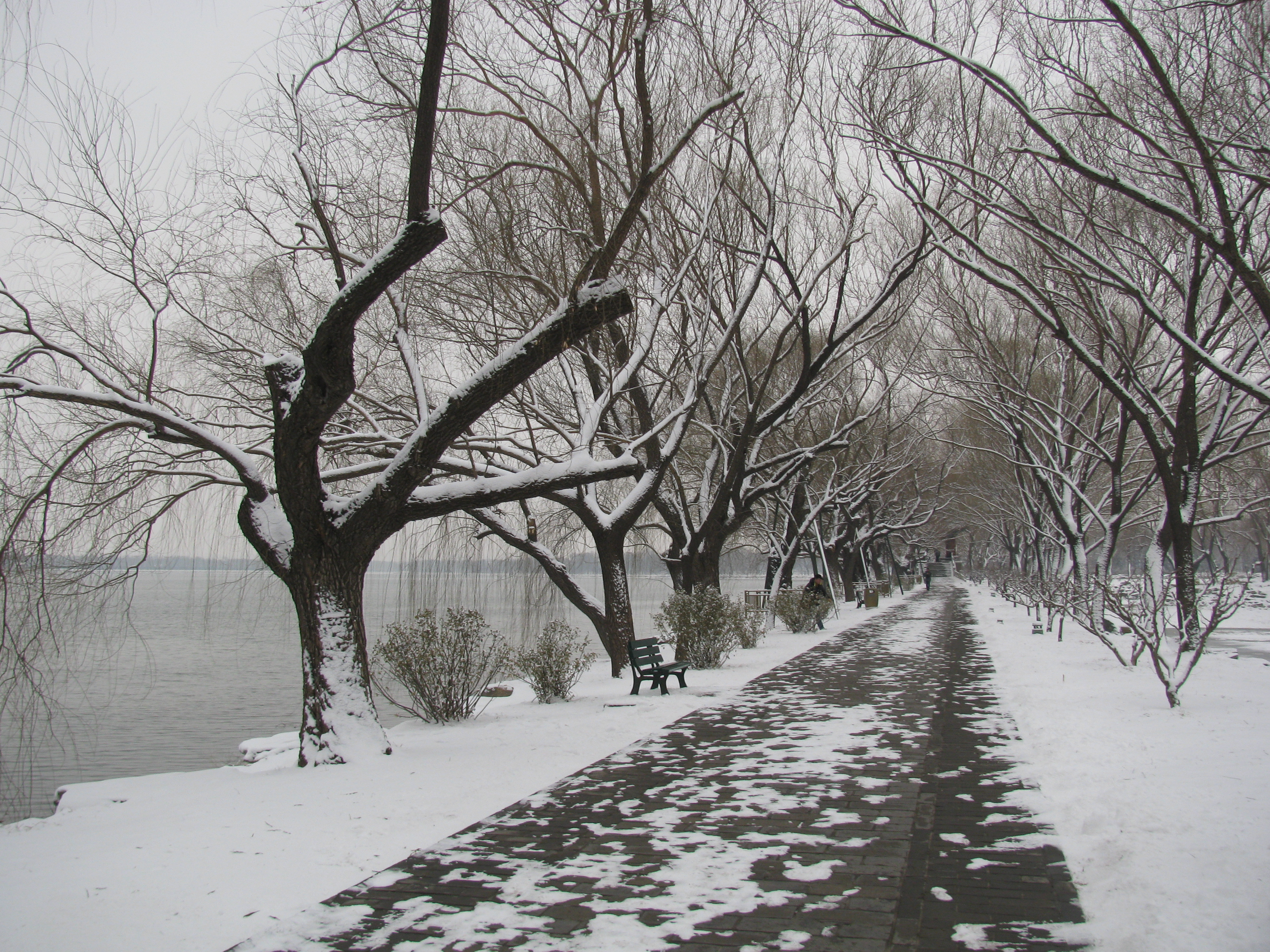
Zaojian Hall Island in Summer Palace

Zhijing Pavilion Island located at the north side of Kunming Lake. A round city wall was surrounded the Zhijing Pavilion on the center of the island. In 1860, after the destruction of British and French forces, Cixi removed the parts of this pavilion to rebuild other buildings in the Summer Palace. Since then the Zhijing Pavilion has been abandoned. Now, all that can be seen are the remains.

==== Zaojian Hall Island ====
Zaojian Hall Island located at the south side of Kunming Lake. The location is secluded. A small garden is also on the island. Qianlong liked to rest here at leisure time.

=== Bridges ===
==== Seventeen Arch Bridge ====
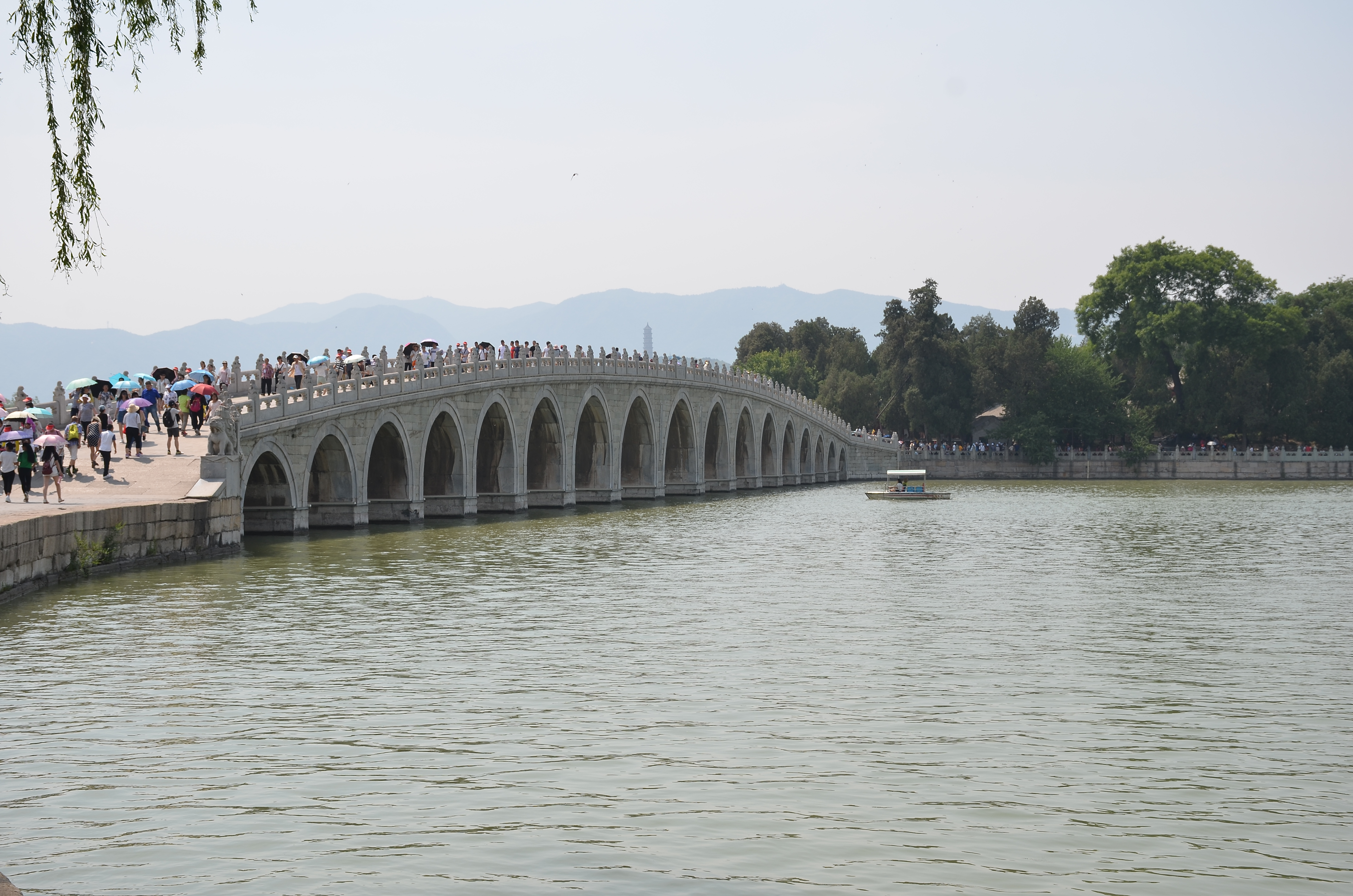
Far view of the 17-arch stone bridge

The Seventeen-Arch Bridge has a total length of 150 meters and a width of 8 meters. It is composed of 17 holes with different heights and widths. The holes on both sides are symmetrical, making the bridge body like a long rainbow and presenting a curved arch bridge. There are 62 pairs of pillars on the bridge railing, and 544 small stone lions with different expressions are decorated on the head of the pillars.

==== Xiuyi Bridge ====
The high-arched stone bridge with a single hole located at the southernmost bridge in the Summer Palace. It is the boundary between Kunming Lake and the Changhe River, and the only way for the emperors of the Qing Dynasty to enter the Summer Palace from the Changhe waterway.

==== Jiehu Bridge ====
Jiehu Bridge is the northernmost bridge of the lake's western shore. The bridge was first built in 1750, burned down by the British and French allied forces in 1860, and rebuilt by Cixi in 1886. It is a 3-hole stone bridge, 31.43 meters long, 6.52 meters at its widest point, 4.28 meters at its narrowest point, and about 5.84 meters high. There are 20 steps and 27 railings on both sides of the bridge.

==== Jade Belt Bridge ====
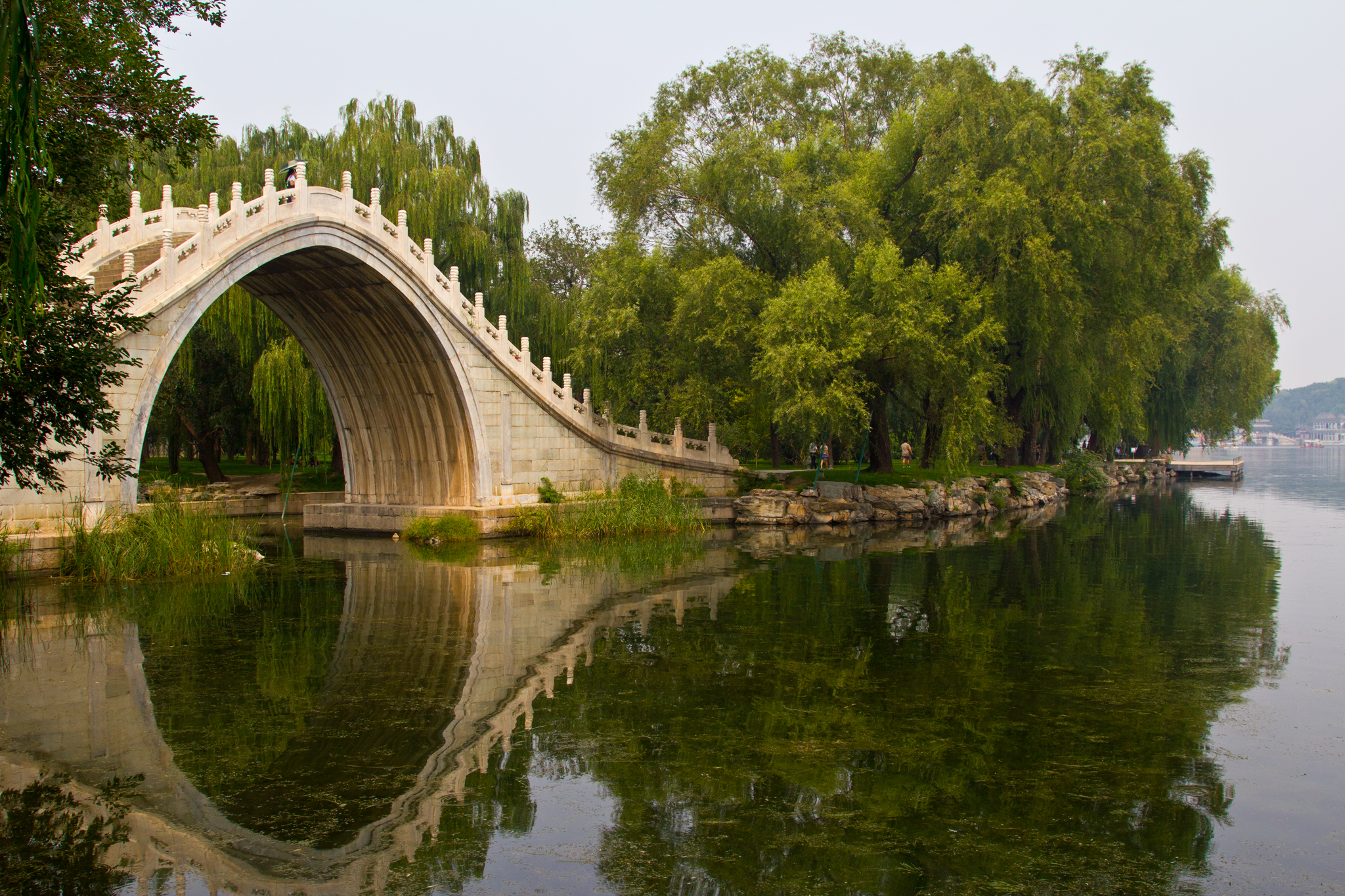
Jade Belt Bridge in Summer Palace

Jade Belt Bridge, one of the six bridges on the western of Kunming Lake, is a high-arch stone bridge built during the Qianlong emperor. The bridge body is made of white marble and bluestone. This is not only the water inlet of Kunming Lake, but also the exit for emperors to go to Yuquan Mountain.

== See also ==
- History of Beijing
- Kunming
- Dianchi Lake
