= Summer Palace =

Complex of gardens and palaces in Beijing, China; UNESCO World Heritage Site

UNESCO World Heritage Site
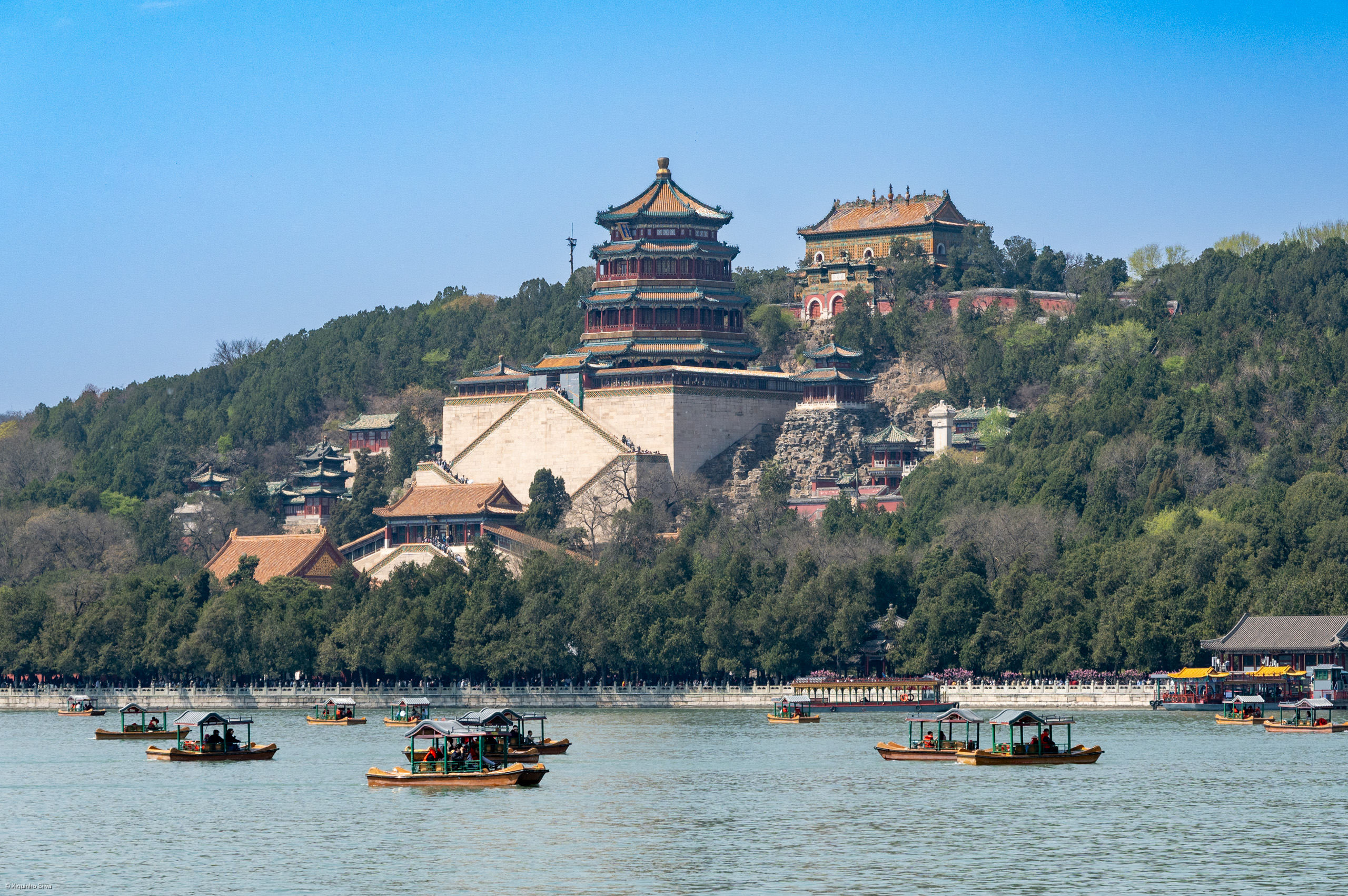
- The Summer Palace in Beijing

- Location within Beijing Location within China
- Location: Haidian, Beijing, China
- Criteria: Cultural: i, ii, iii
- Reference: 880
- Inscription: 1998 (22nd Session)
- Area: 297 ha (730 acres)
- Buffer zone: 5,545 ha (13,700 acres)
- Website: summerpalace-china.com
- Coordinates: 39°59′51.00″N 116°16′8.04″E

Summer Palace
- "Summer Palace" in Simplified (top) and Traditional (bottom) Chinese characters
- Simplified Chinese: 颐和园
- Traditional Chinese: 頤和園
- Literal meaning: Garden of Preserving Harmony
Transcriptions
Standard Mandarin
- Hanyu Pinyin: Yíhéyuán
- Wade–Giles: I^{2}-ho^{2}-yüan^{2}
- IPA: [ǐ.xɤ̌.ɥɛ̌n]
Yue: Cantonese
- Yale Romanization: Yìh-wòh-yùhn

The Summer Palace or Yihe Garden (simplified Chinese: 颐和园; traditional Chinese: 頤和園; pinyin: Yíhéyuán) consists of a vast ensemble of lakes, gardens and palaces located in Beijing. An imperial garden during the Qing dynasty, it includes Longevity Hill (万寿山; 萬壽山; Wànshòu Shān), Kunming Lake, and Seventeen-Arch Bridge. It covers an expanse of 2.9 square kilometres (1.1 sq mi), three-quarters of which is water.

Longevity Hill is about 60 metres (200 ft) high and has many buildings positioned in sequence. The front hill is the site of halls and pavilions, while the back hill, in sharp contrast, is quiet with natural beauty. The central Kunming Lake, covering 2.2 square kilometres (540 acres), was entirely man-made and the excavated soil was used to build Longevity Hill.

The Summer Palace, which is inspired by the gardens of South China, contains over 3,000 Chinese ancient buildings that house a collection of over 40,000 valuable historical relics from various dynasties.

In December 1998, UNESCO included the Summer Palace on its World Heritage List. It declared the Summer Palace "a masterpiece of Chinese landscape garden design. The natural landscape of hills and open water is combined with artificial features such as pavilions, halls, palaces, temples and bridges to form a harmonious ensemble of outstanding aesthetic value".

Notably in Chinese history, it is also the Central Route terminus of the South-North Water Transfer Project having traversed 1,267 km (787 mi) from Danjiangkou Reservoir, Hubei, making it Beijing's main water supply.

== History ==
=== Pre-Qing dynasty ===
The origins of the Summer Palace date back to the Jurchen-led Jin dynasty. In 1153, when the fourth emperor Wanyan Liang (r. 1150–1161) moved the Jin capital from Huining Prefecture (in present-day Acheng District, Harbin, Heilongjiang) to Yanjing (present-day Beijing), he ordered the construction of a palace in the Fragrant Hills and Jade Spring Hill in what is now the northwest of Beijing.

Around 1271, after the Yuan dynasty established its capital in Khanbaliq (present-day Beijing), the engineer Guo Shoujing initiated a waterworks project to direct the water from Shenshan Spring (神山泉) in Baifu Village (白浮村), Changping into the Western Lake (西湖), which would later become Kunming Lake. Guo aimed to create a water reservoir that would ensure a stable water supply for the palace.

In 1494, the Hongzhi Emperor (r. 1487–1505) of the Ming dynasty had a Yuanjing Temple (圓靜寺) built for his wet nurse, Lady Luo, in front of Jar Hill (瓮山), which was later renamed Longevity Hill. The temple fell into disrepair over the years and was abandoned, and the area around the hill became lush with vegetation. The Zhengde Emperor (r. 1505–21), who succeeded the Hongzhi Emperor, built a palace on the banks of the Western Lake and turned the area into an imperial garden. He renamed Jar Hill "Golden Hill" (金山) and named the lake "Golden Sea" (金海). Both the Zhengde Emperor and the Wanli Emperor (r. 1572–1620) enjoyed taking boat rides on the lake. During the reign of the Tianqi Emperor (r. 1620–27), the court eunuch Wei Zhongxian took the imperial garden as his personal property.

=== Qing dynasty ===
In the early Qing dynasty, Jar Hill served as the site for horse stables in the imperial palace. Eunuchs who committed offences were sent there to weed and cut grass. At the beginning of the reign of the Qianlong Emperor (r. 1735–1796), many imperial gardens were built in the area around present-day Beijing's Haidian District and accordingly, water consumption increased tremendously. At the time, much of the water stored in the Western Lake came from the freshwater spring on Jade Spring Hill, while a fraction came from the Wanquan River (萬泉河). Any disruption of the water flow from Jade Spring Hill would have affected the capital's water transport and water supply systems.

Around 1749, the Qianlong Emperor decided to build a palace in the vicinity of Jar Hill and the Western Lake to celebrate the 60th birthday of his mother, Empress Dowager Chongqing. He ordered the Western Lake to be expanded further west to create two more lakes, Gaoshui Lake (高水湖) and Yangshui Lake (養水湖), with the aim of improving the capital's waterworks system. The three lakes served not only as a reservoir for the imperial gardens but also as a source of water for the surrounding agricultural areas. The Qianlong Emperor collectively named the three lakes "Kunming Lake" after the Kunming Pool (昆明池) constructed by Emperor Wu (2nd century BC) in the Han dynasty for the training of his navy. The earth excavated from the expansion of Kunming Lake was used to enlarge Jar Hill, which was renamed "Longevity Hill". The Summer Palace, whose construction was completed in 1764 at a cost of over 4.8 million silver taels, was initially named "Qingyiyuan" (清漪園; 'Gardens of Clear Ripples').

The design of the Summer Palace was based on a legend in Chinese mythology about three divine mountains in the East Sea, namely Penglai, Fangzhang (方丈) and Yingzhou (瀛洲). The three islands in Kunming Lake – Nanhu Island (南湖島), Tuancheng Island (團城島) and Zaojiantang Island (藻鑒堂島) – were made to represent the three mountains, while the lake itself was based on a blueprint of the West Lake in Hangzhou. Moreover, many architectural features in the palace were also built to resemble or imitate various attractions around China. For example, the Phoenix Pier (鳳凰墩) represented Lake Tai; the Jingming Tower (景明樓) resembled Yueyang Tower, Hunan; the Wangchan Pavilion (望蟾閣) resembled Yellow Crane Tower; the shopping streets were designed to imitate those in Suzhou and Yangzhou. The centrepiece of the Summer Palace was the "Great Temple of Gratitude and Longevity" (大報恩延壽寺). There was also a Long Corridor more than 700 metres (2,300 ft) long which was furnished with artistic decorations. As the palace was not equipped with facilities for long-term residence and the daily administration of state affairs, the Qianlong Emperor never dwelt there and only remained for the day whenever he visited it.

As the Qing Empire started declining after the reign of the Daoguang Emperor (r. 1820–1850), the Summer Palace gradually became more neglected and the architectural features on the three islands were ordered to be dismantled due to the rising costs of maintenance. During the Second Opium War, British and French forces occupied the Summer Palace and the nearby Old Summer Palace in December 1860, sacking and burning both. The occupations came as part of an invasion of Northern China by Britain and France to force the government of the Qing dynasty to come to the negotiating table.

Between 1884–95, during the reign of the Guangxu Emperor (r. 1875–1908), Empress Dowager Cixi reportedly ordered up to 22 million silver taels, originally designated for upgrading the Qing navy (the Beiyang Fleet), to be used for reconstructing and enlarging the Summer Palace to celebrate her 60th birthday; however, some other sources state that a maximum of six million taels were allotted, of which none came from the Navy's capital budget, but only the accrued bank interest paid. As the funds were limited, the construction works were concentrated on the buildings at the front of Longevity Hill and the dams around Kunming Lake. The Summer Palace was also given its present-day Chinese name, "Yiheyuan" (頤和園), in 1888. In 1900, towards the end of the Boxer Rebellion, the Summer Palace suffered damage again when the forces of the Eight-Nation Alliance destroyed the imperial gardens and seized many artifacts stored in the palace. The palace was restored two years later.

=== Post-Qing dynasty ===
In 1912, following the abdication of the Puyi, the last Emperor, the Summer Palace became the private property of the former imperial family of the Qing Dynasty. Two years later, the Summer Palace was opened to the public and entry tickets were sold. In 1924, after Puyi was expelled from the Forbidden City by the warlord Feng Yuxiang, the Beijing municipal government took charge of administering the Summer Palace and turned it into a public park.

After 1949, the Summer Palace briefly housed the Central Party School of the Chinese Communist Party. Many of Mao Zedong's friends and key figures in the Communist Party, such as Liu Yazi and Jiang Qing, also lived there. Since 1953, many major restoration and renovation works have been done on the Summer Palace, which is now open to the public as a tourist attraction and park.

In November 1998, the Summer Palace was designated a World Heritage Site by UNESCO. Towards the end of 2006, the Chinese government also started distributing commemorative coins to celebrate the Summer Palace as a cultural relic of the world.

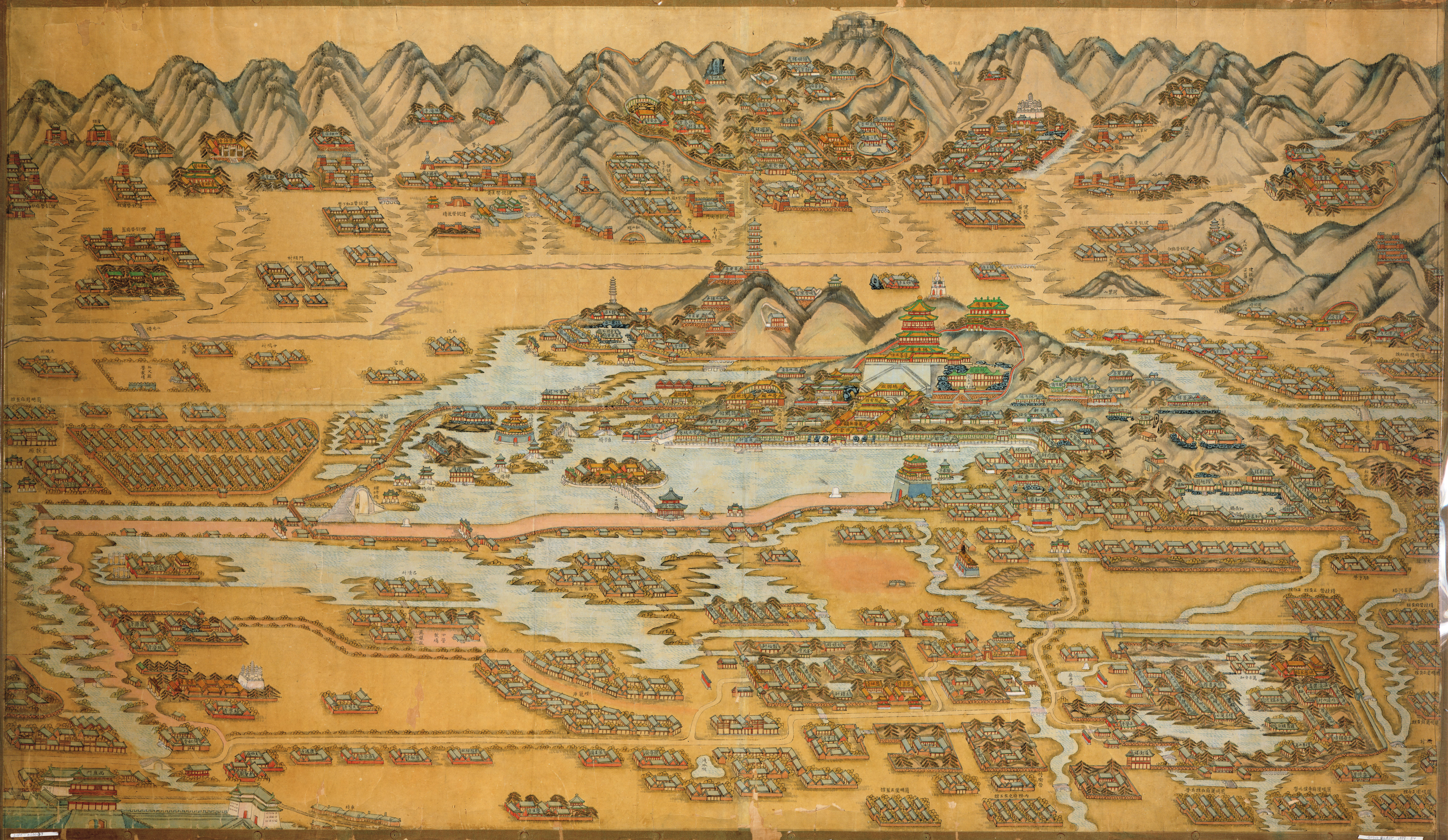
Pictorial plan of the Summer Palace, c. 1888.

== Attractions ==
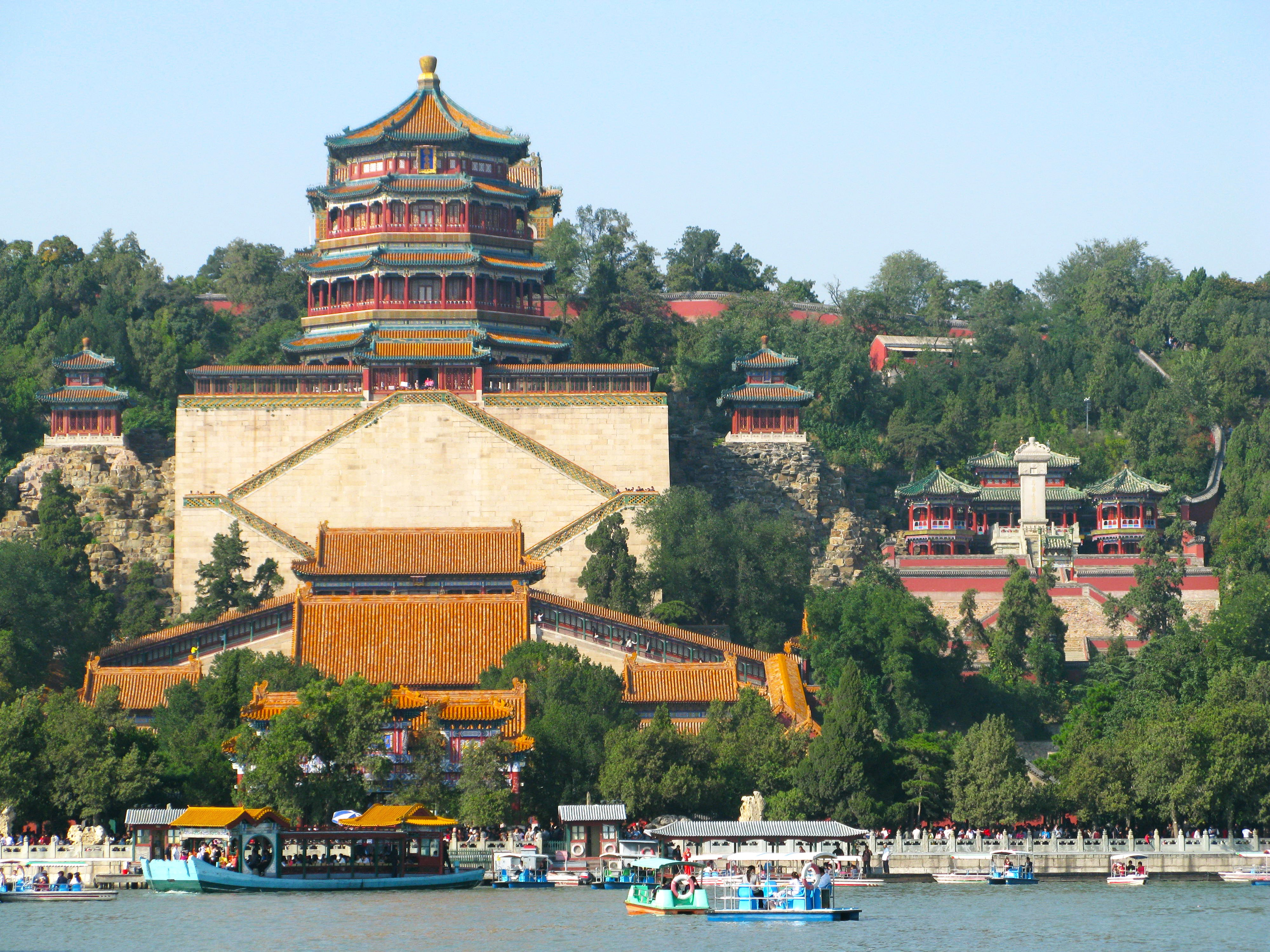
Foxiang Ge (Tower of Buddhist Incense) at Wanshou Shan (Longevity Hill)

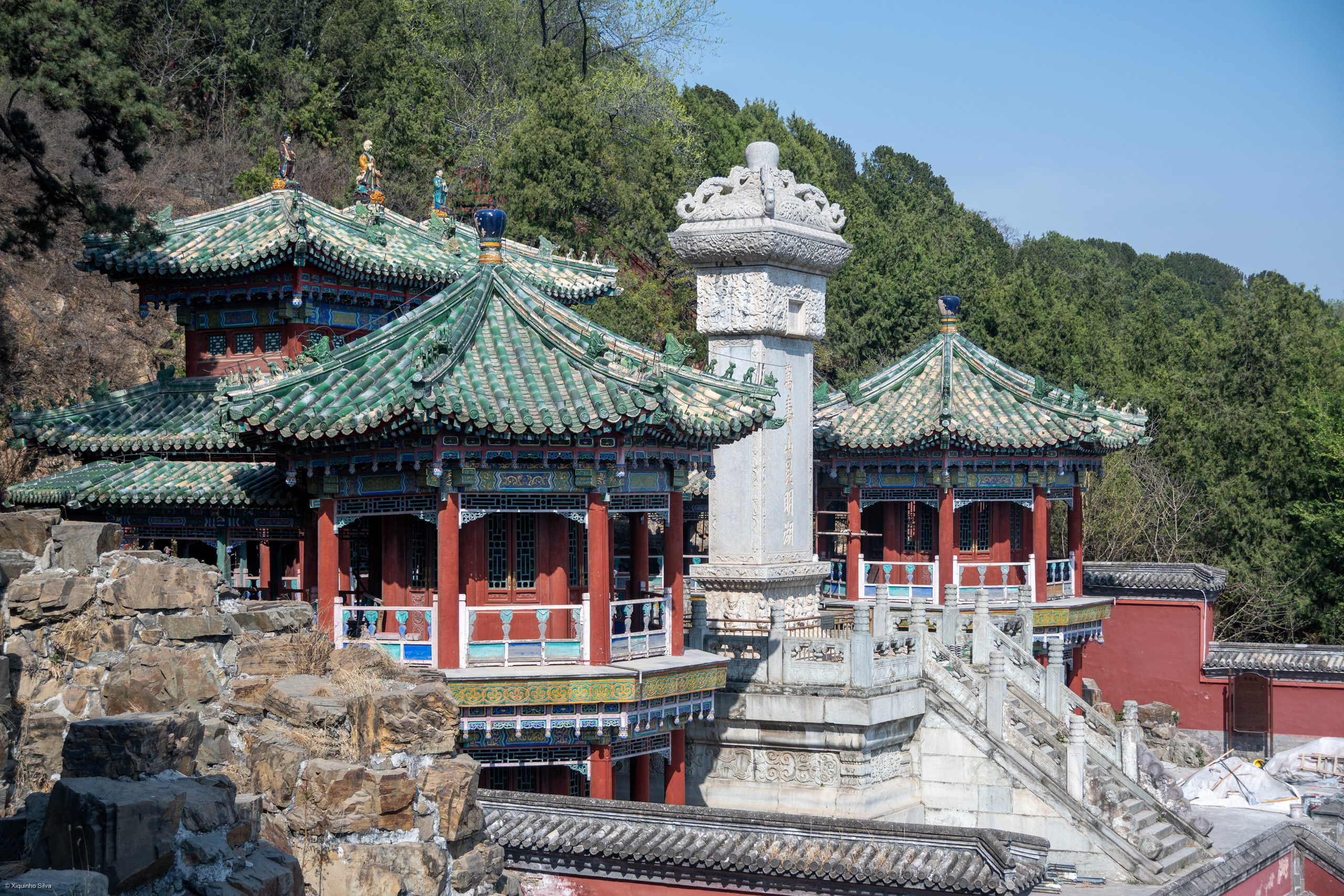
Stele of Longevity Hill and Kunming Lake

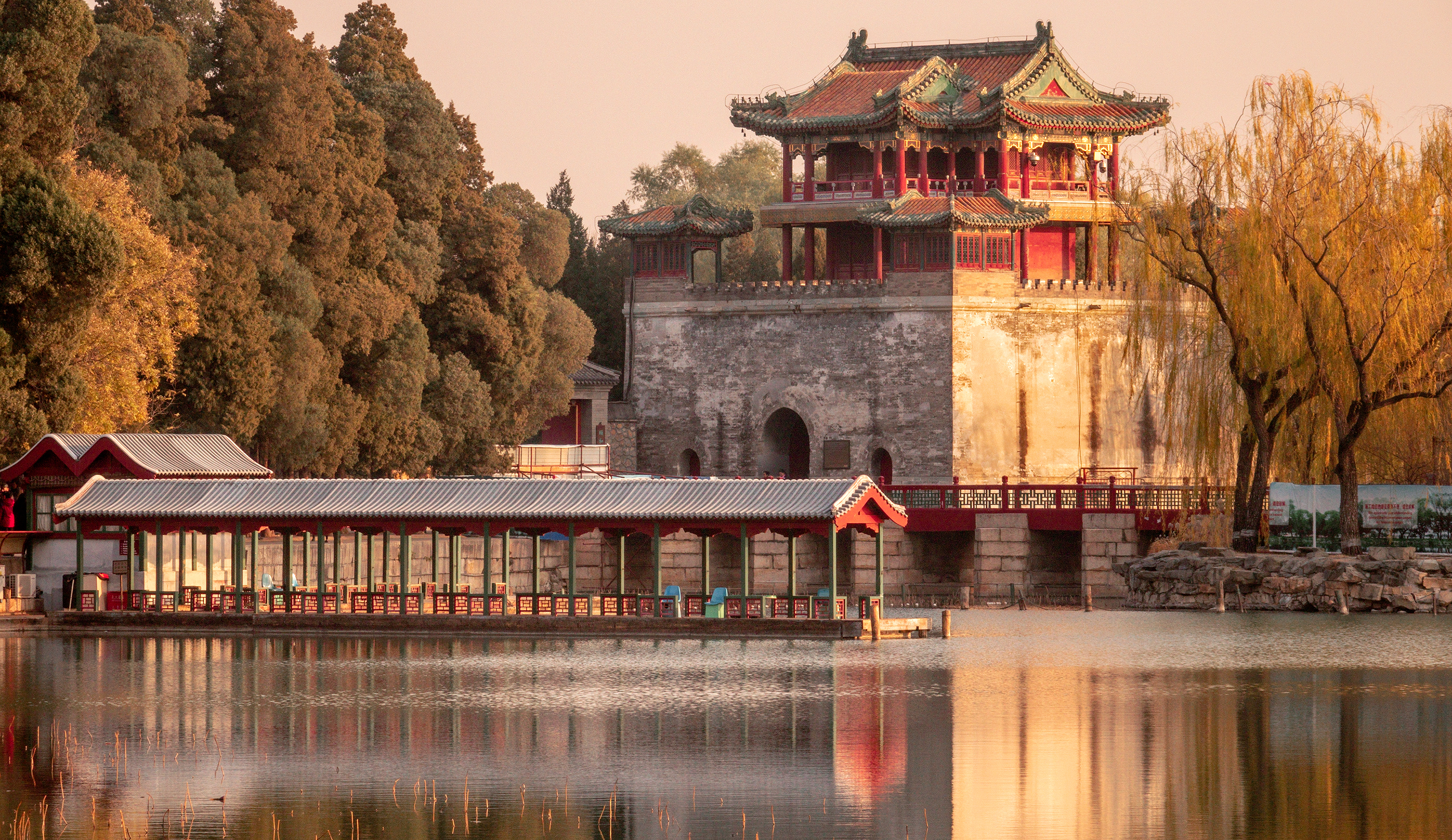
The Wenchang Pavilion

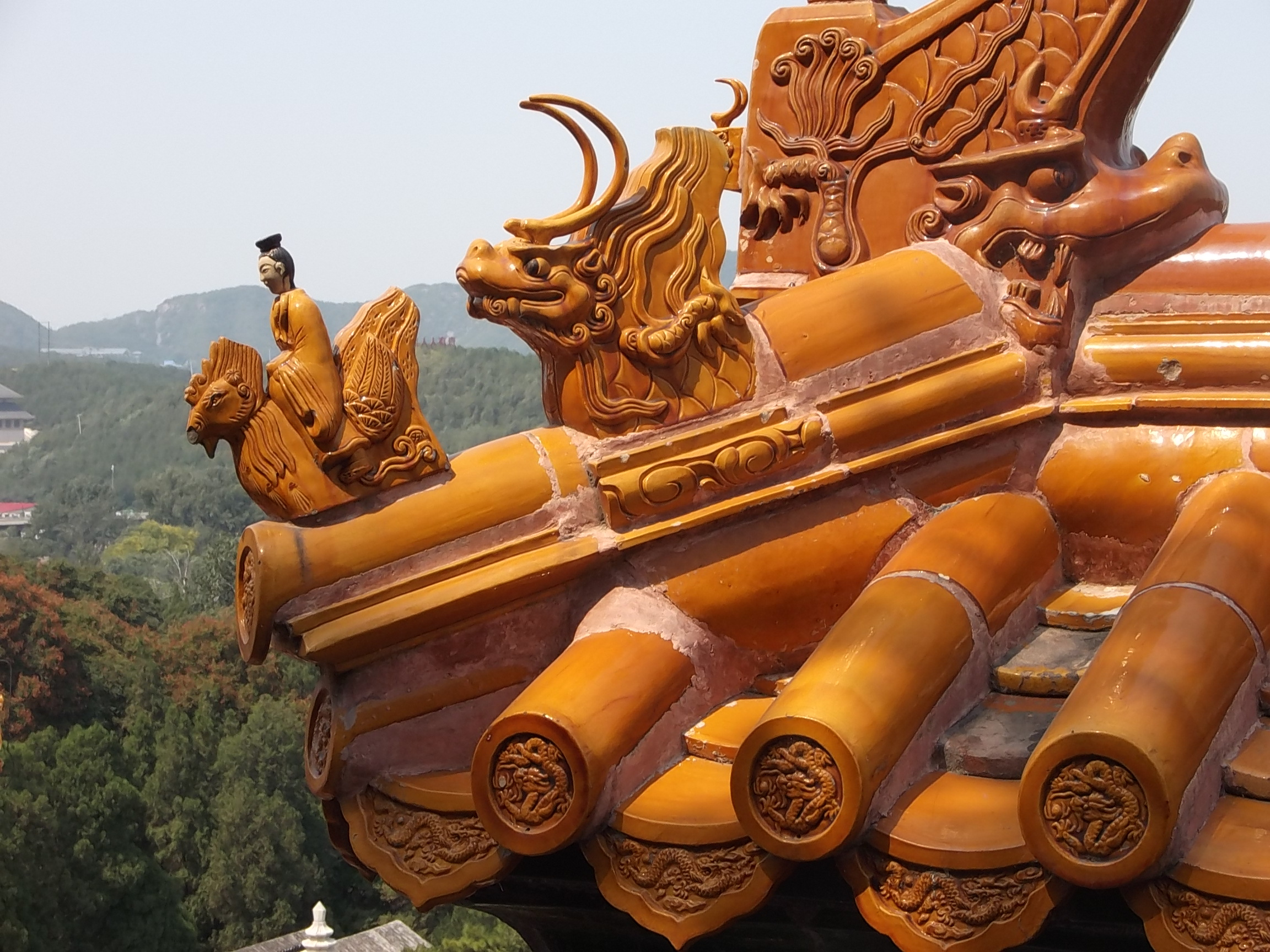
Imperial roof decorations

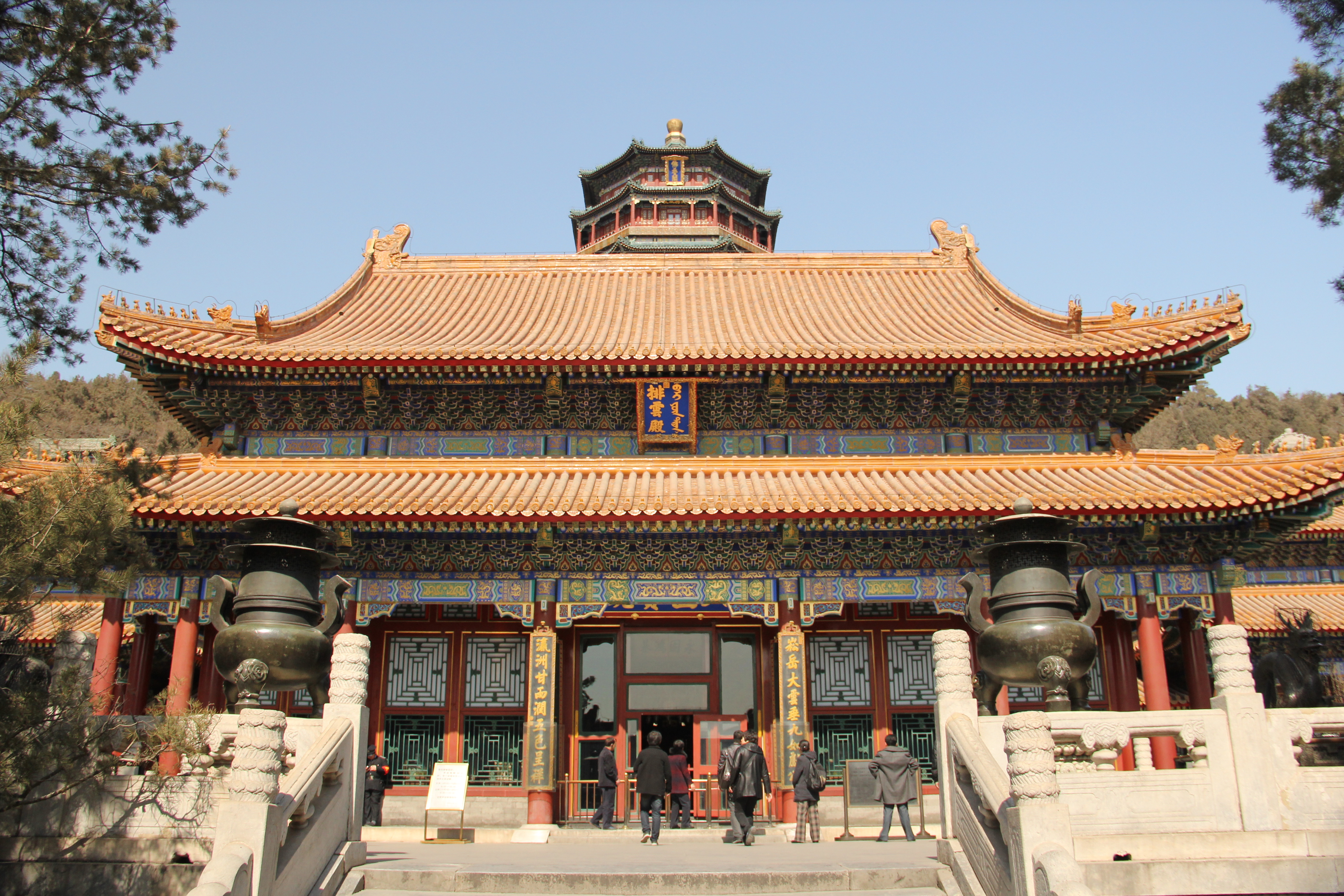
Paiyun Dian (Hall of Dispelling Clouds) and Foxiang Ge (Tower of Buddhist Incense) at Wanshou Shan (Longevity Hill), Summer Palace

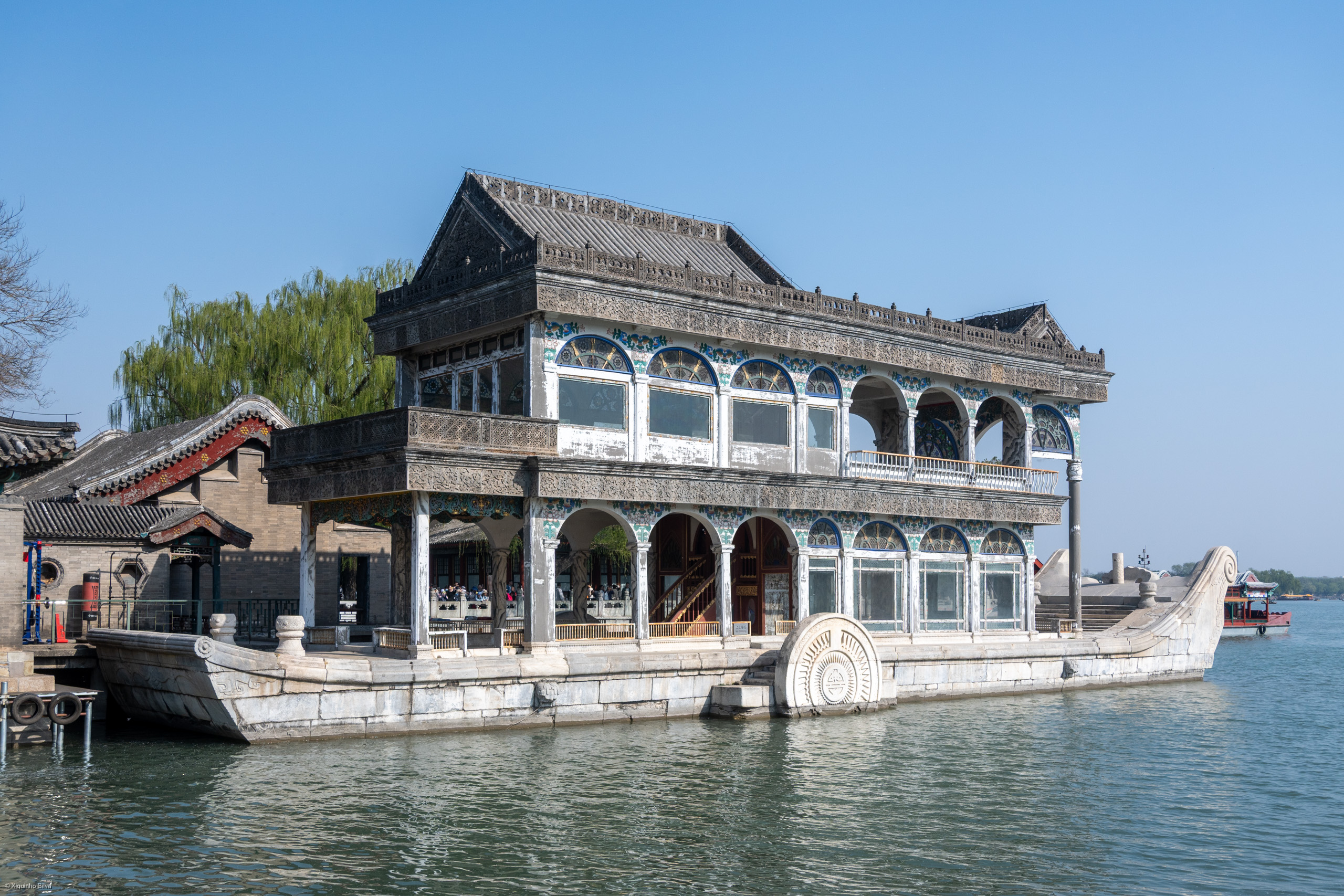
Stone Boat

The entire Summer Palace is centered around Longevity Hill and Kunming Lake, with the latter covering about three-quarters of the area. Most of the important buildings were built along the north–south axis of Longevity Hill, which is divided into the front hill and the back hill. There are three small islands within Kunming Lake: Nanhu Island, Zaojiantang Island and Zhijingge Island. The West Dam of Kunming Lake divides the lake in two. The East Dam was constructed during the reign of the Guangxu Emperor. The attractions in the Summer Palace may be divided into six different sections or scenic areas: the Halls, Longevity Hill, Kunming Lake, the Farming and Weaving Picture Scenic Area, the Long Corridor and the Central Axis area. The Summer Palace is among the most-visited destinations in China, ranking in the top five and attracts about 10 million tourists annually.

=== Front Hill ===
- Eastern Palace Gate (simplified Chinese: 东宫门; traditional Chinese: 東宮門; pinyin: Dōnggōngmén): The main entrance to the Summer Palace. The two bronze lions on either side of the gate are preserved from the Qianlong Emperor's time while the Cloud Dragon Steps in front of the gate are relics from the Old Summer Palace. The three Chinese characters "Yiheyuan" on the sign above the gate were written by the Guangxu Emperor.
- Hall of Benevolence and Longevity (仁寿殿; 仁壽殿; Rénshòudiàn): The hall where court sessions were held. It was called the "Hall of Good Governance" (勤政殿) in the Qianlong Emperor's time but was given its present-day name by the Guangxu Emperor. The well north of the hall is called the "Year-Prolonging Well" (延年井) while the rockery behind the hall was designed to imitate the Lion Grove Garden in Suzhou. The stalactites are relics from the Old Summer Palace.
- Hall of Jade Billows (玉澜堂; 玉瀾堂; Yùlántáng): Located west of the Hall of Benevolence and Longevity. It was the living quarters of the Qing emperors. The Guangxu Emperor was once confined here by Empress Dowager Cixi.
- Yiyun Hall (宜芸馆; 宜芸館; Yíyúnguǎn): Located north of the Hall of Jade Billows. It was originally a library in the Qianlong Emperor's time but became the living quarters of Empress Longyu in the Guangxu Emperor's time. It housed a collection of stone carvings of calligraphy written by the Qianlong Emperor.
- Dehe Garden (德和园; 德和園; Déhéyuán): Houses the three-storey Great Opera Hall (大戏楼; 大戲樓), where opera performances were staged.
- Hall of Joy and Longevity (乐寿堂; 樂壽堂; Lèshòutáng): The living quarters of Empress Dowager Cixi.
- Long Corridor (长廊; 長廊; Chángláng): Stretches from the Hall of Joy and Longevity in the east to Shizhang Pavilion in the west. The entire corridor is 728 metres (2,388 ft) long and contains artistic decorations, including paintings of famous places in China, and scenes from Chinese mythology and folktales, The Twenty-four Filial Exemplars and the Four Great Classical Novels.
- Hall of Dispelling Clouds (排云殿; 排雲殿; Páiyúndiàn): Situated on the centre of the central axis of Longevity Hill. Originally the Great Temple of Gratitude and Longevity (大報恩延壽寺), it was renovated in 1892 and became a place for Empress Dowager Cixi to receive guests, host grand ceremonies, and celebrate her birthday.
- Tower of Buddhist Incense (佛香阁; 佛香閣; Fóxiānggé): Located right in the centre of the front hill of Longevity Mountain. The tower was originally meant to be a nine-storey Buddhist pagoda built to resemble the Yellow Crane Tower. The Qianlong Emperor ordered the construction to be stopped just after the eighth storey was built. The tower was built on a 20 m (66 ft) tall stone base, measures three stories and 41 metres (135 ft) in height, and is supported by eight ironwood pillars. Empress Dowager Cixi visited the tower to offer incense and pray.
- Sea of Wisdom (智慧海; Zhìhuìhǎi): Located on the peak of Longevity Hill. It was built from coloured glass and houses over 1,000 statues of Buddhist figures. It was partially damaged during the Cultural Revolution.
- Stele of Longevity Hill and Kunming Lake (万寿山昆明湖碑; 萬壽山昆明湖碑; Wànshòushān Kūnmínghú Bēi): Located east of the Hall of Dispelling Clouds. The stele bears six Chinese characters written by the Qianlong Emperor.

Visual tour of the Summer Palace, Buddhist Incence Tower (Fóxiānggé).

- Pavilion of Precious Clouds (宝云阁; 寶雲閣; Bǎoyúngé): Located west of the Tower of Buddhist Incense. It was originally called the "Bronze Pavilion" (铜亭; 銅亭) and was built in 1755. The doors and windows were stolen by soldiers from the Eight-Nation Alliance in 1900. In the 1980s, they were purchased by overseas Chinese and donated back to the Summer Palace. As of March, 2026 the western courtyards of Longevity Hill, including the Bronze Pavilion, are closed to the public. According to staff, there are no plans to reopen this section.
- Stone Boat (石舫; Shífǎng): The Stone Boat is 36 metres (118 ft) long. The original wooden boat was burnt in 1860 and has been replaced with a marble copy with western-style paddle wheels.
- Oriole-Listening Hall (听鹂馆; 聽鸝館; Tīnglíguǎn): Located west of Longevity Hill. It used to be where Empress Dowager Cixi watched opera performances. The hall is now converted into a restaurant specialising in Qing imperial cuisine.
- Huazhongyou (画中游; 畫中游; Huàzhōngyóu): Located west of Longevity Hill, just above the Oriole-Listening Hall, with a view over Kunming Lake.
- East of the Front Hill (前山东部; 前山東部; Qiánshān Dōngbù): Has many pavilions and halls.
- West of the Front Hill (前山西部; Qiánshān Xībù): Has many pavilions and halls.
- West of the Long Corridor (长廊西端; 長廊西端; Chángláng Xīduān): There is a "West Four Hall" (西四厅; 西四廳) located north of Shizhang Pavilion. The Guangxu Emperor's Consort Zhen was confined in the hall by Empress Dowager Cixi. It used to be the west entrance into the Summer Palace during the Qianlong Emperor's time.

=== Back Hill ===
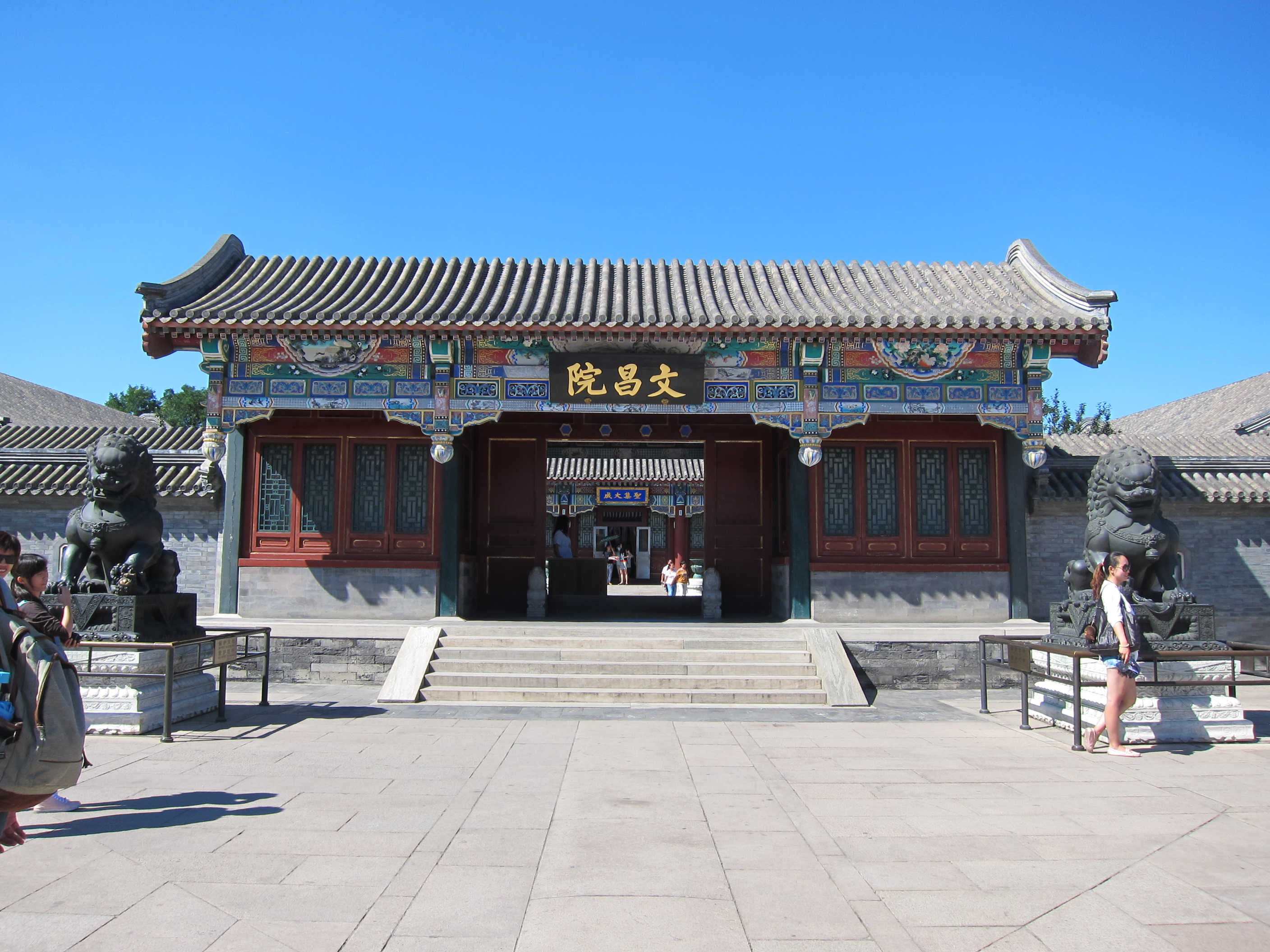
Wenchang Pavilion

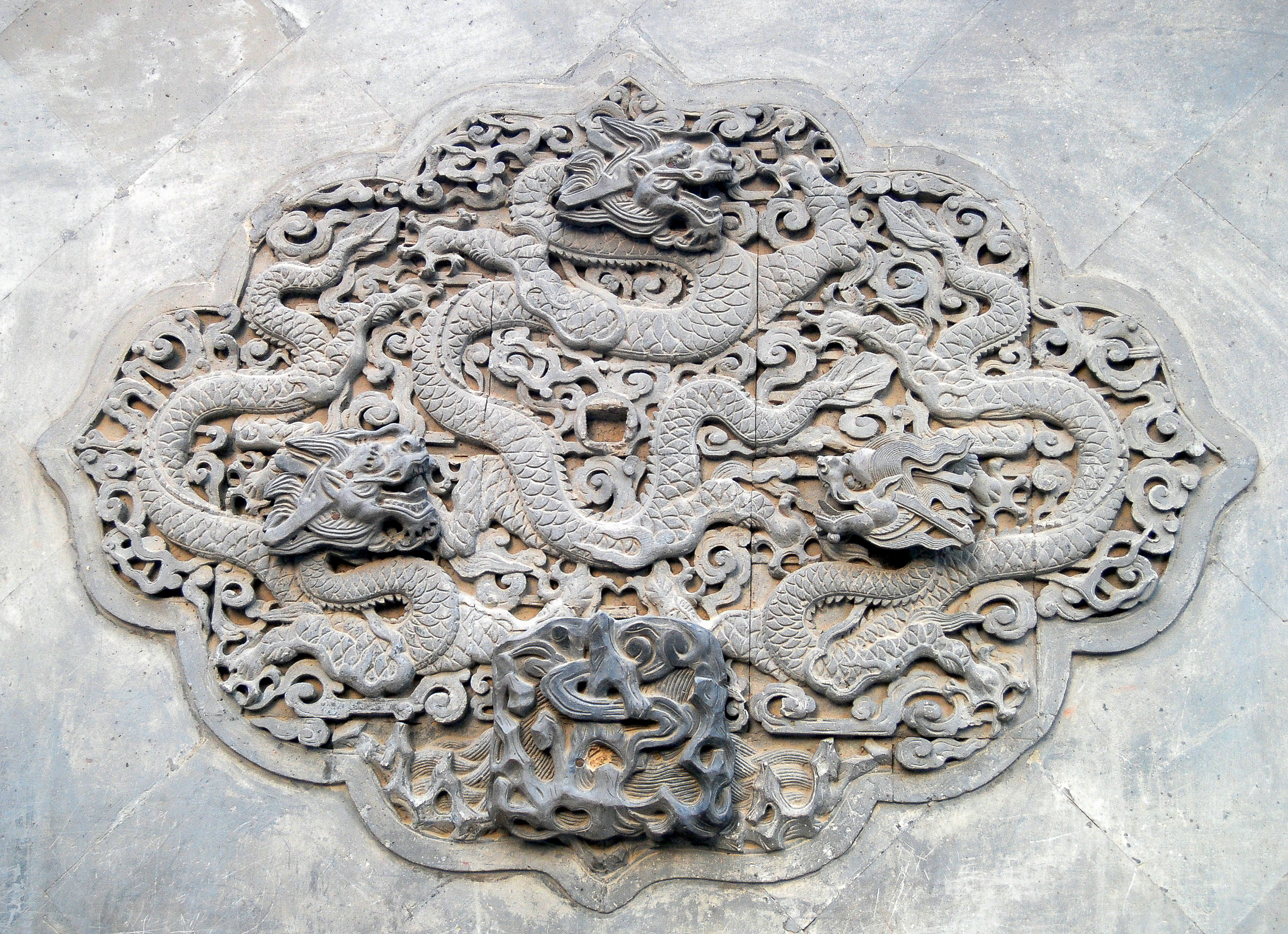
Relief of three Chinese dragons

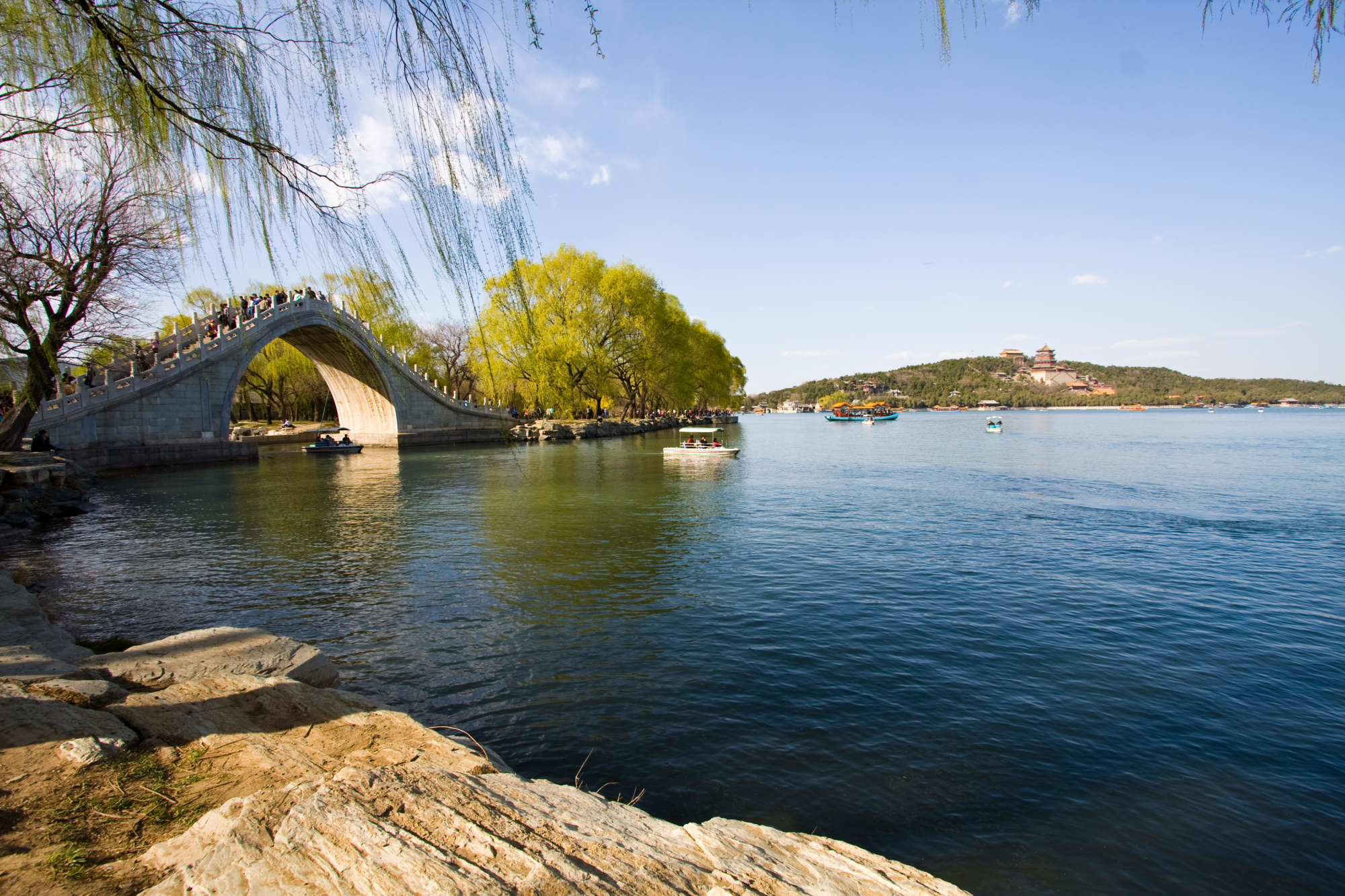
The Kunming lake

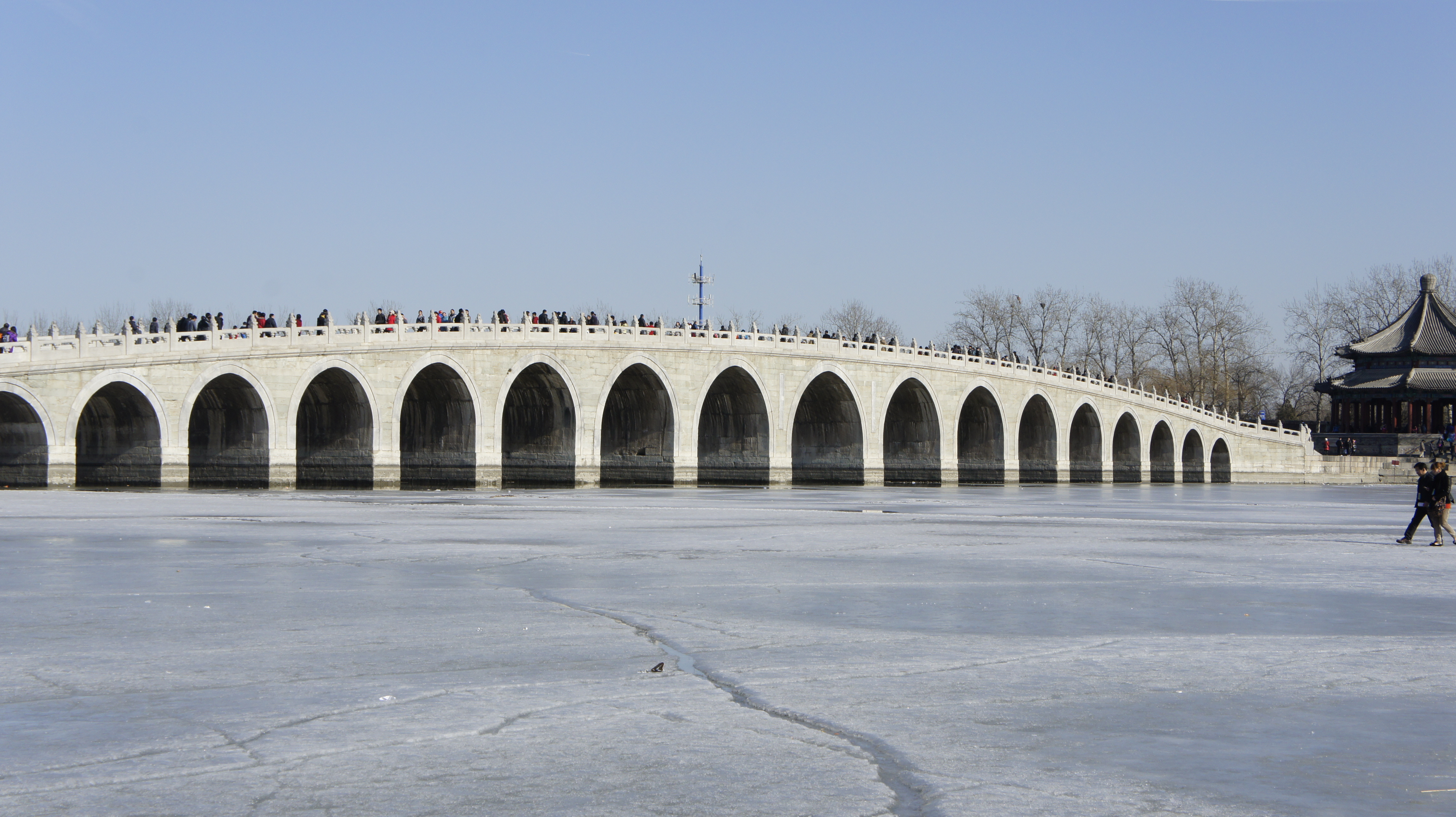
The Seventeen-Arch Bridge

- Suzhou Street (苏州街; 蘇州街; Sūzhōujiē): In 1762, after returning from touring the Jiangnan region, the Qianlong Emperor ordered the construction of a shopping street resembling Shantang Street in Suzhou. The street was destroyed by the British and French in 1860 and was only restored in 1988.
- Garden of Harmonious Pleasures (谐趣园; 諧趣園; Xiéqùyuán): Located in the northeast corner of the Summer Palace. In 1751, when the Qianlong Emperor toured the Jiangnan region, he was so impressed with Jichang Garden in Wuxi that he ordered a Huishan Garden (惠山園) to be built in the Summer Palace modelled after Jichang Garden. Huishan Garden was renamed "Xiequ Garden" in 1811.
- Four Great Regions (四大部洲; Sìdàbùzhōu): Located on the centre of the central axis of the back hill. It was designed to resemble the Samye Monastery in Tibet and houses statues of Bhaisajyaguru, the Buddha and Amitābha. It was destroyed by the British and French in 1860 but was restored later.
- Flower Pavilion and Glass Tower (花承阁琉璃塔; 花承閣琉璃塔; Huāchénggé Liúlítǎ): Located east of the back hill. It was destroyed by the British and French in 1860; only the Glass Tower remains. During the Cultural Revolution, the Buddhist statue at the bottom of the tower was disfigured by the Red Guards.
- Former Location of Gaichunyuan (赅春园遗址; 賅春園遺址; Gāichūnyuán Yízhǐ): Located west of the back hill. A small garden was built there during the Qianlong Emperor's time and the emperor also had his study room there. Gaichunyuan was mostly destroyed by the British and French in 1860.
- Former Location of Qiwang Pavilion (绮望轩遗址; 綺望軒遺址; Qǐwàngxuān Yízhǐ): Located west of the back hill beside the lake. A small garden was built there during the Qianlong Emperor's time.

=== Eastern Dam ===
- Zhichun Pavilion (知春亭; Zhīchūntíng): Located on the east bank of Kunming Lake at the south of the Hall of Jade Billows.
- Wenchang Tower (文昌阁; 文昌閣; Wénchānggé): Built to resemble a city gate. It served as an important entry point into the Summer Palace from the east and south during the Qianlong Emperor's time. The Wenchang Hall (文昌院), often called a Gallery, is located beside Wenchang Tower and displays cultural artefacts from the Summer Palace.
- Kuoru Pavilion (廓如亭; Kuòrútíng): Situated in the middle of the eastern dam, east of the 17 Openings Bridge. It covered an area of 130 m^{2} (1,400 sq ft).
- Bronze Ox (铜牛; 銅牛; Tóngniú): A bronze statue of an ox built in 1755.
- Yelü Chucai Shrine (耶律楚材词; 耶律楚材祠; Yēlǜ Chǔcái Cí): A shrine built by the Qianlong Emperor to commemorate Yelü Chucai, an influential statesman in the Mongol Empire. It was closed down after 2003 and its front section was converted into a souvenir shop.

=== Nanhu Island ===
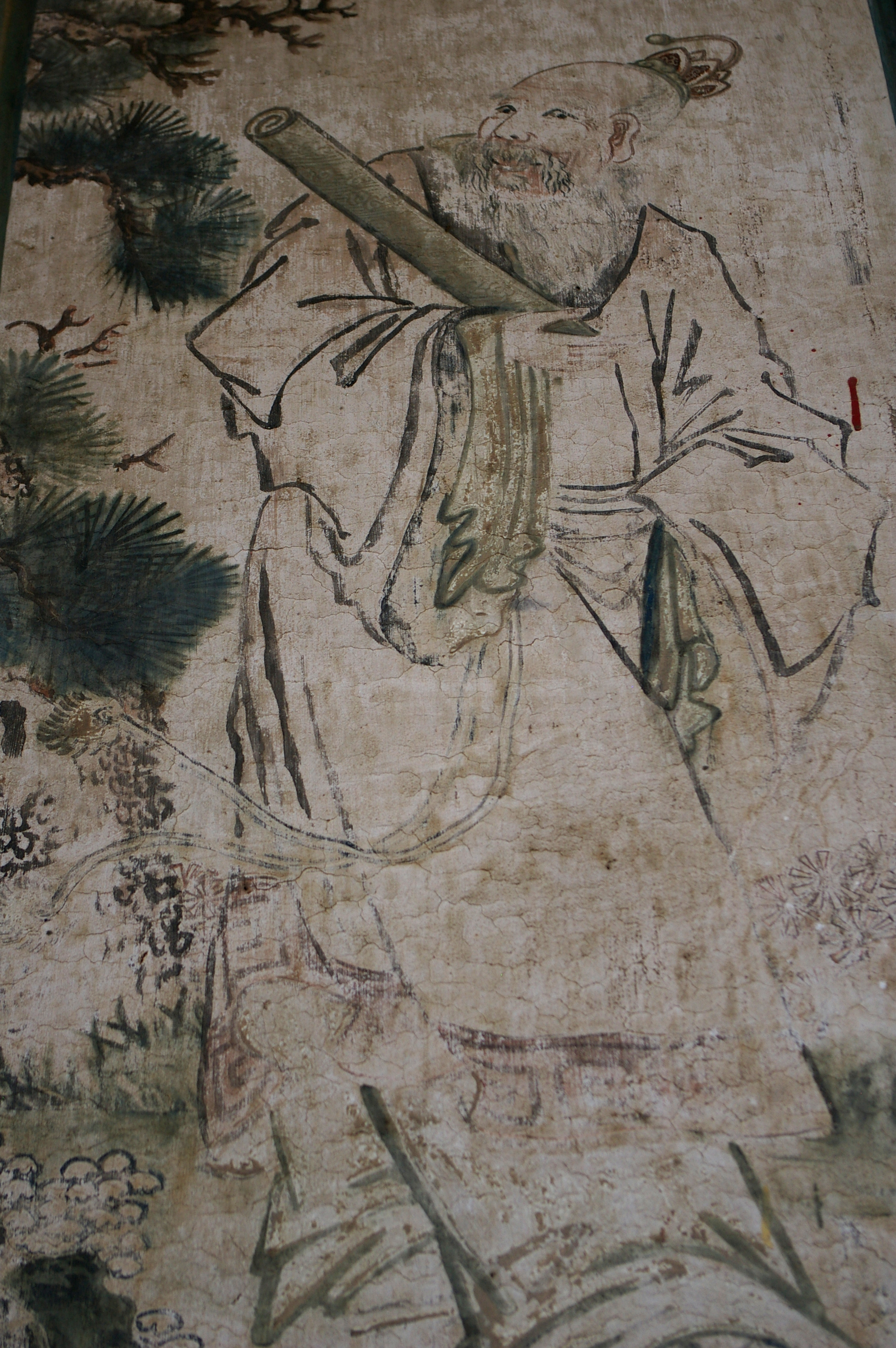
Portion of a fresco of a pavilion of the Summer Palace.

- 17-Arch Bridge (十七孔桥; 十七孔橋; Shíqīkǒngqiáo): Has 17 different types of arches on it. It incorporates features of the Precious Belt Bridge in Suzhou and the Lugou Bridge in Beijing. The entire bridge is 150 metres (490 ft) long and 8 metres (26 ft) wide.
- Dragon King Temple (龙王庙; 龍王廟; Lóngwángmiào): A temple built to worship the Dragon King.
- Hanxu Hall (涵虚堂; 涵虛堂; Hánxūtáng): Located the north of Nanhu Island, directly facing the Tower of Buddhist Incense on the north bank.

=== Western Dam ===
- Lake Dividing Bridge (界湖桥; 界湖橋; Jièhúqiáo): The bridge that separates Kunming Lake from the northern lake.
- Jade Belt Bridge (玉带桥; 玉帶橋; Yùdàiqiáo)
- Binfeng Bridge (豳风桥; 豳風橋; Bīnfēngqiáo)
- Jingming Tower (景明楼; 景明樓; Jǐngmínglóu): It was destroyed by the British and French in 1860 and was restored only in 1992. It was designed to imitate Yueyang Tower.
- Mirror Bridge (镜桥; 鏡橋; Jìngqiáo)
- White Silk Bridge (练桥; 練橋; Liànqiáo)
- Willow Bridge (柳桥; 柳橋; Liǔqiáo): Located most south of the western dam.
- Farming and Weaving Picture Scenic Area (耕织图景区; 耕織圖景區; Gēngzhítú Jǐngqū): Built during the Qianlong Emperor's time, it was designed to bring to life a scene from the daily lives of peasants. This area was excluded from the Summer Palace after it was renovated by Empress Dowager Cixi. In 1949, the area was occupied by the People's Liberation Army and a paper-making factory was built there. In 2003, the area was incorporated back into the Summer Palace and some old buildings were restored.

== Climate ==
Kunming Lake

Climate chart (precipitation, max. and min. temperature)
J	F	M	A	M	J	J	A	S	O	N	D
2 1 −5	5 6 −1	8 13 3	35 24 9	29 32 18	128 35 22	226 36 25	88 34 22	112 30 20	24 20 11	32 11 5	5 2 −3
- █ Average max. and min. temperatures in °C
- █ Precipitation totals in mm
Imperial conversion
J	F	M	A	M	J	J	A	S	O	N	D
0.1 34 23	0.2 43 30	0.3 55 37	1.4 75 48	1.1 90 64	5 95 72	8.9 97 77	3.5 93 72	4.4 86 68	0.9 68 52	1.3 52 41	0.2 36 27
- █ Average max. and min. temperatures in °F
- █ Precipitation totals in inches

== Transport ==
- Beigongmen station on Line 4 of Beijing Subway, near the North Gate.
- Summer Palace West Gate station on Xijiao line of Beijing Subway, near the West Gate.

== See also ==
- Old Summer Palace (Yuanming Garden)
- West Garden
- History of Beijing
