= List of bridges in Sichuan =

This is a list of bridges in Sichuan, China.

== Bridges ==
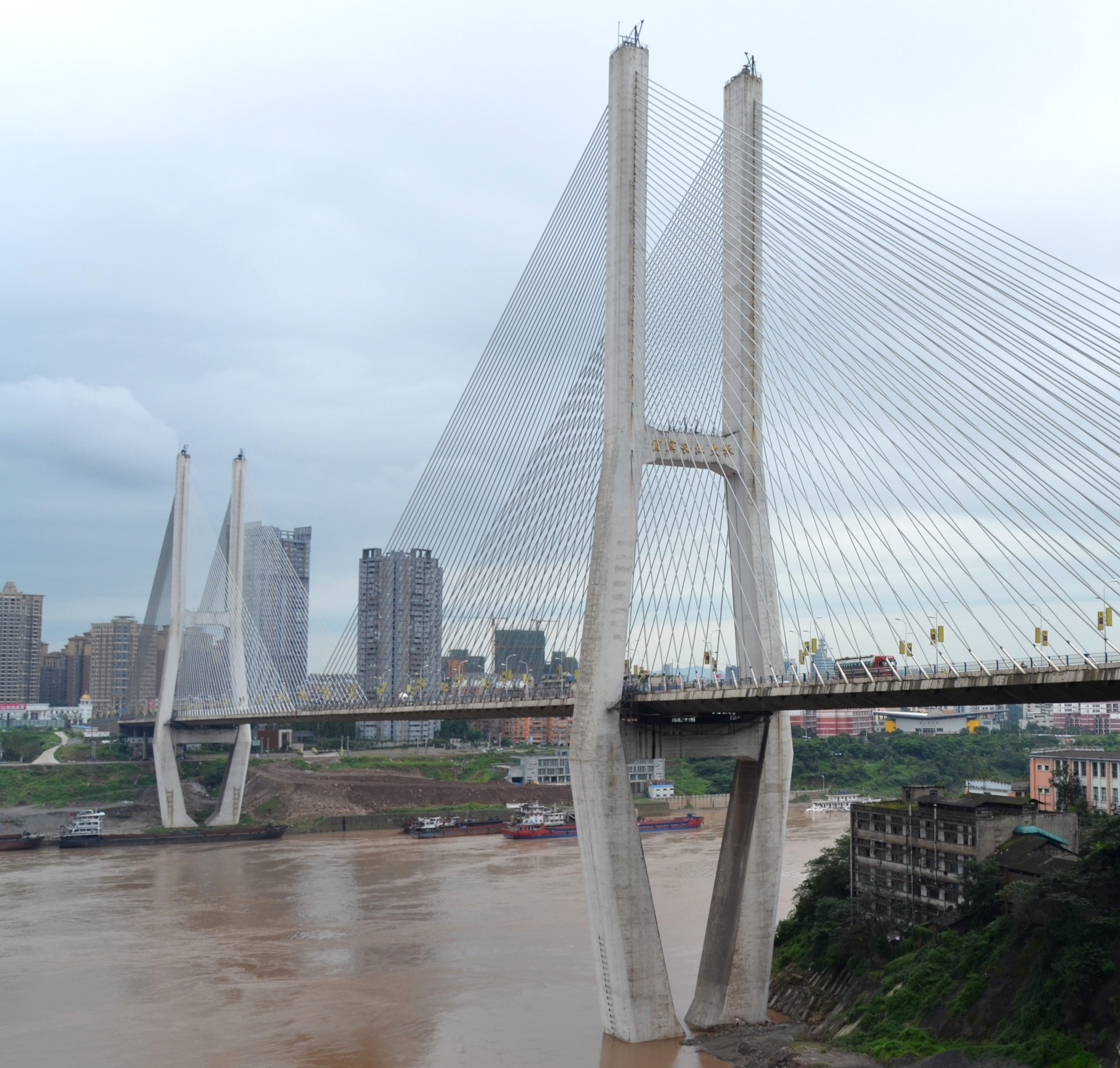
The Yibin Bridge over the Yangtze River

- Bingcaogang Bridge
- Bosideng Bridge
- Fujiang Bridge
- Kuige Bridge
- Labajin Bridge
- Luding Bridge
- Luding Yaye Expressway Bridge
- Miaoziping Bridge
- Nanxi Bridge
- Qiancao Bridge
- Qianwei Bridge
- Rongzhou Bridge
- Taian Yangtze River Bridge
- Xiaonanmen Bridge
- Xipan Bridge
- Yibin Bridge
- Zhaohua Jialing Jiang Bridge
- Zhongba Bridge

== See also ==
- List of bridges in China
- Yangtze River bridges and tunnels
