= List of bridges in Jiangsu =

This is a list of bridges in Jiangsu, China.

== Bridges ==
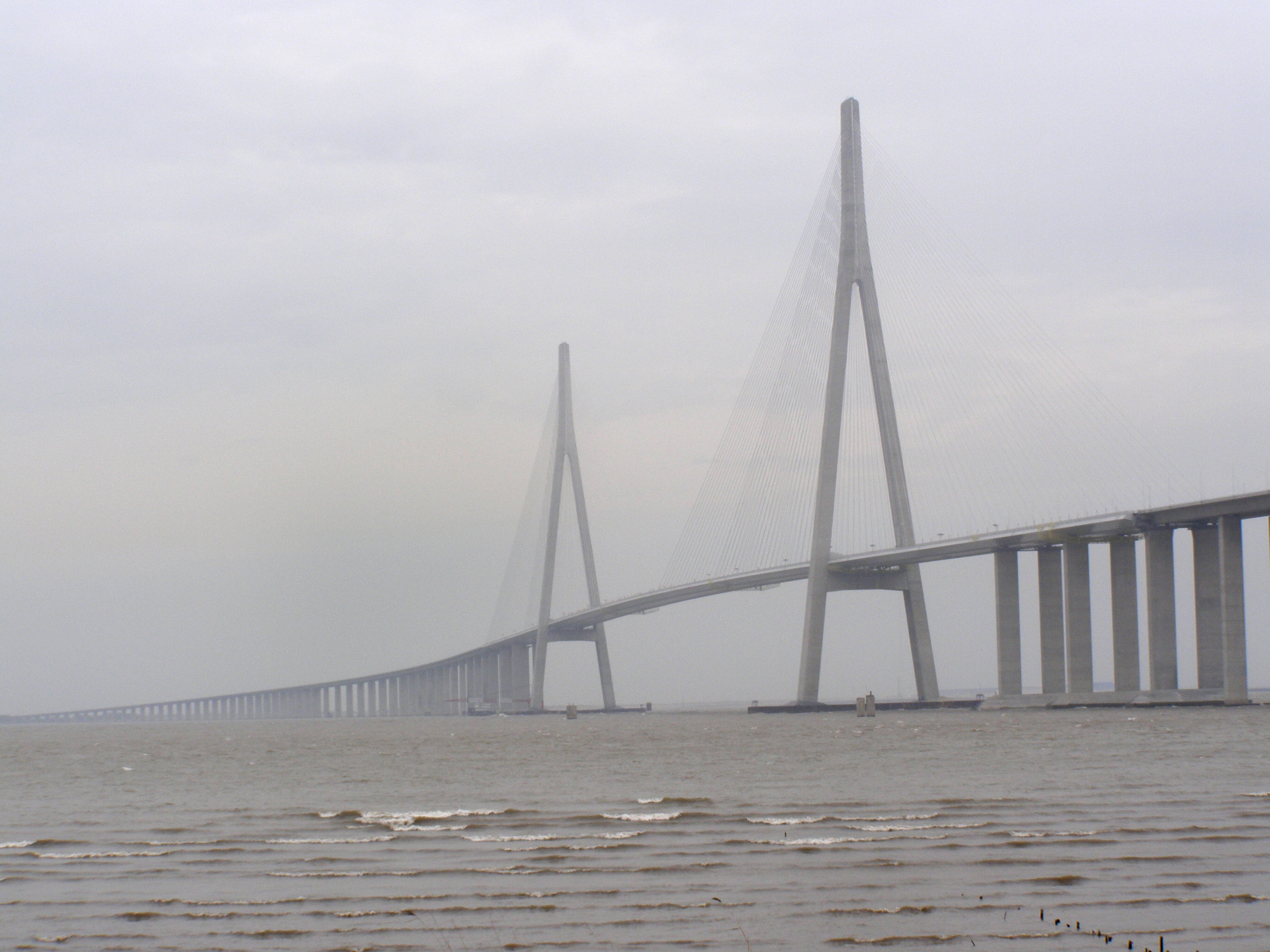
The Sutong Bridge, the second longest cable-stayed bridge in the world

- Chonghai Bridge under construction
- Chongqi Bridge
- Danyang–Kunshan Grand Bridge
- Dashengguan Bridge
- Fourth Nanjing Yangtze River Bridge
- Jiangyin Suspension Bridge
- Nanjing Yangtze River Bridge
- Precious Belt Bridge
- Runyang Bridge
- Second Nanjing Yangtze Bridge
- Sutong Bridge
- Taihu Bridge
- Taizhou Yangtze River Bridge
- Third Nanjing Yangtze Bridge

== See also ==
- List of bridges in China
- Yangtze River bridges and tunnels
