= Changtai Yangtze River Bridge =

Cable-stayed bridge, China

Changtai Yangtze River Bridge 常泰长江大桥
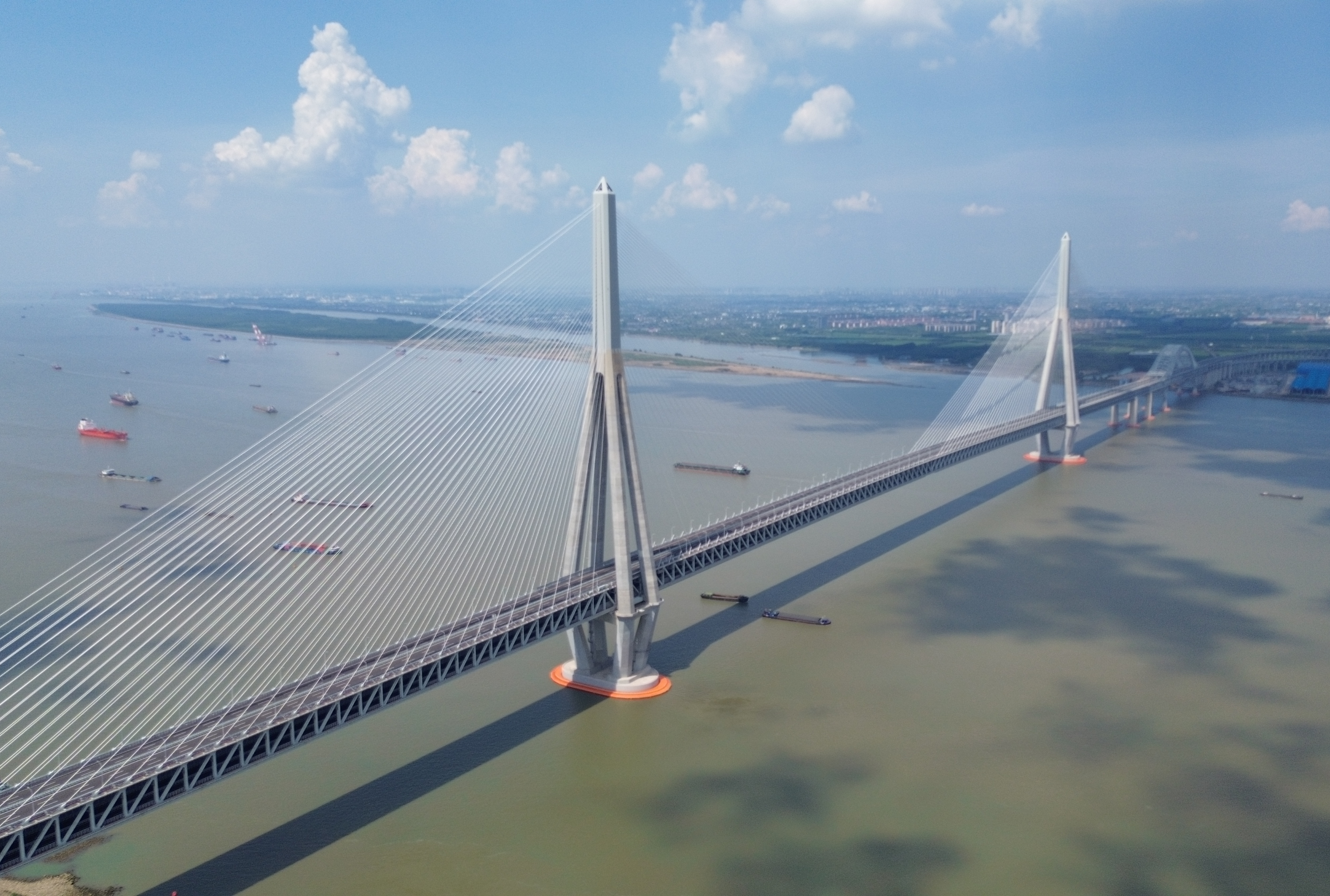
- Coordinates: 32°00′31″N 119°58′06″E
- Carries: Upper level: Jiangsu S30 Ruchang Expressway; Lower level: Taichang Intercity Railway (under planning); Two-way four-lane conventional highway
- Crosses: Yangtze River
- Locale: Changzhou–Taizhou, Jiangsu, China

Characteristics
- Design: double deck cable-stayed bridge with through arch approach spans
- Material: Steel, concrete
- Total length: 10,030 m (32,907 ft)
- Width: 36.6 m (120 ft)
- Height: 352 m (1,155 ft)
- Longest span: 1,176 m (3,858 ft)
- Clearance above: 900 m (2,953 ft)
- No. of lanes: Upper level: 6 lanes Lower level: 2 railway tracks, 4 lanes

History
- Designer: China Railway Major Bridge Survey and Design Institute
- Constructed by: Jiangsu Provincial Transportation Engineering Construction Bureau
- Construction start: 9 January 2019
- Inaugurated: 9 September 2025 (road)

Location
- Interactive map of Changtai Yangtze River Bridge

The Changtai Yangtze River Bridge (Chinese: 常泰长江大桥 is a through-arch, cable-stayed bridge that connects the cities of Changzhou and Taizhou, in Jiangsu province, China, it crosses the Yangtze river between the Taizhou Yangtze River Bridge upstream and the Jiangyin Yangtze River Bridge downstream.

When it opened in 2025, it surpassed the Russky Bridge to become the longest cable-stayed bridge with a 1,176-metre (3,858 ft) main span and the Millau Viaduct as the tallest bridge structure in the world with a height of 352 metres (1,155 ft).

== Design ==
The Changtai Yangtze River Bridge is a bridge complex with a two-level deck that include a main cable-stayed bridge and two secondary arch bridges with a 388-metre (1,273 ft) span each.

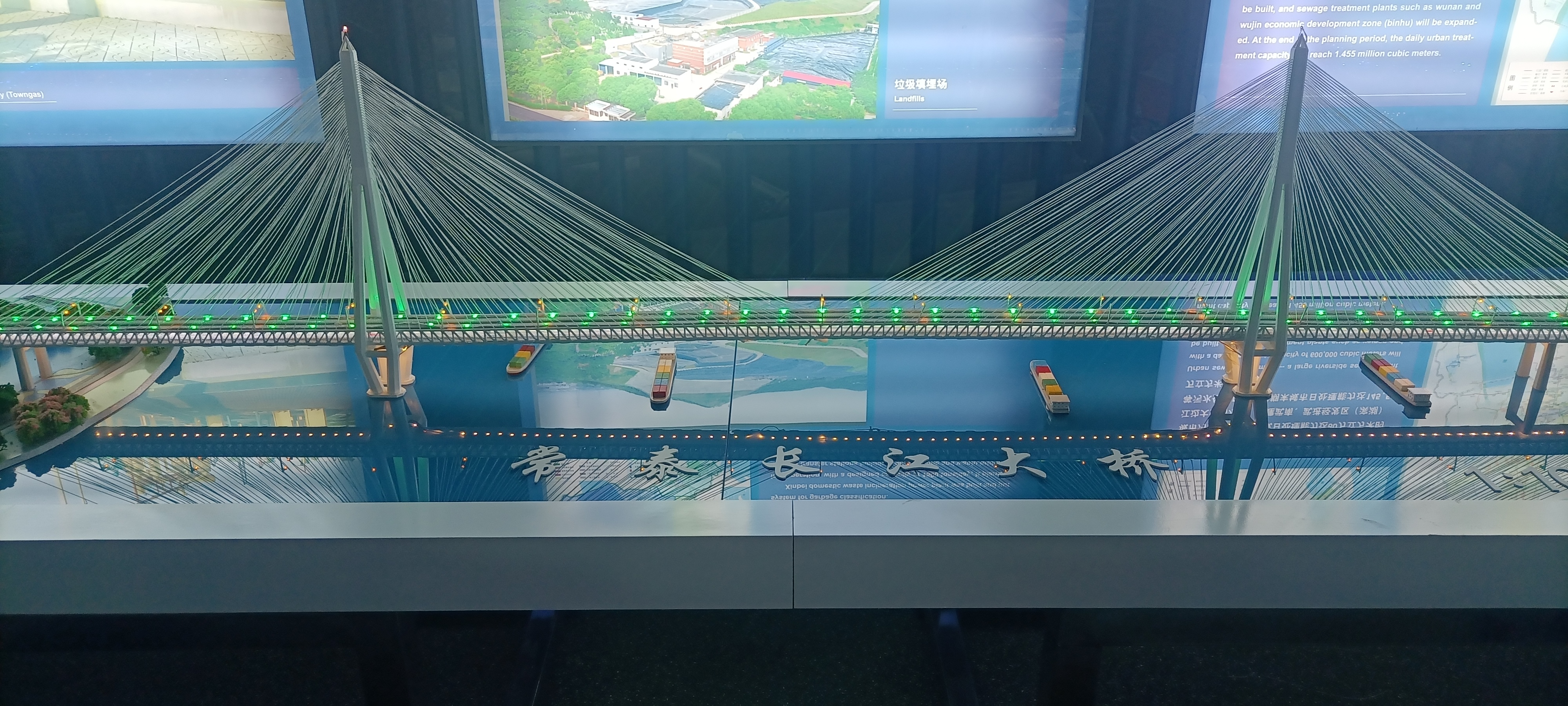

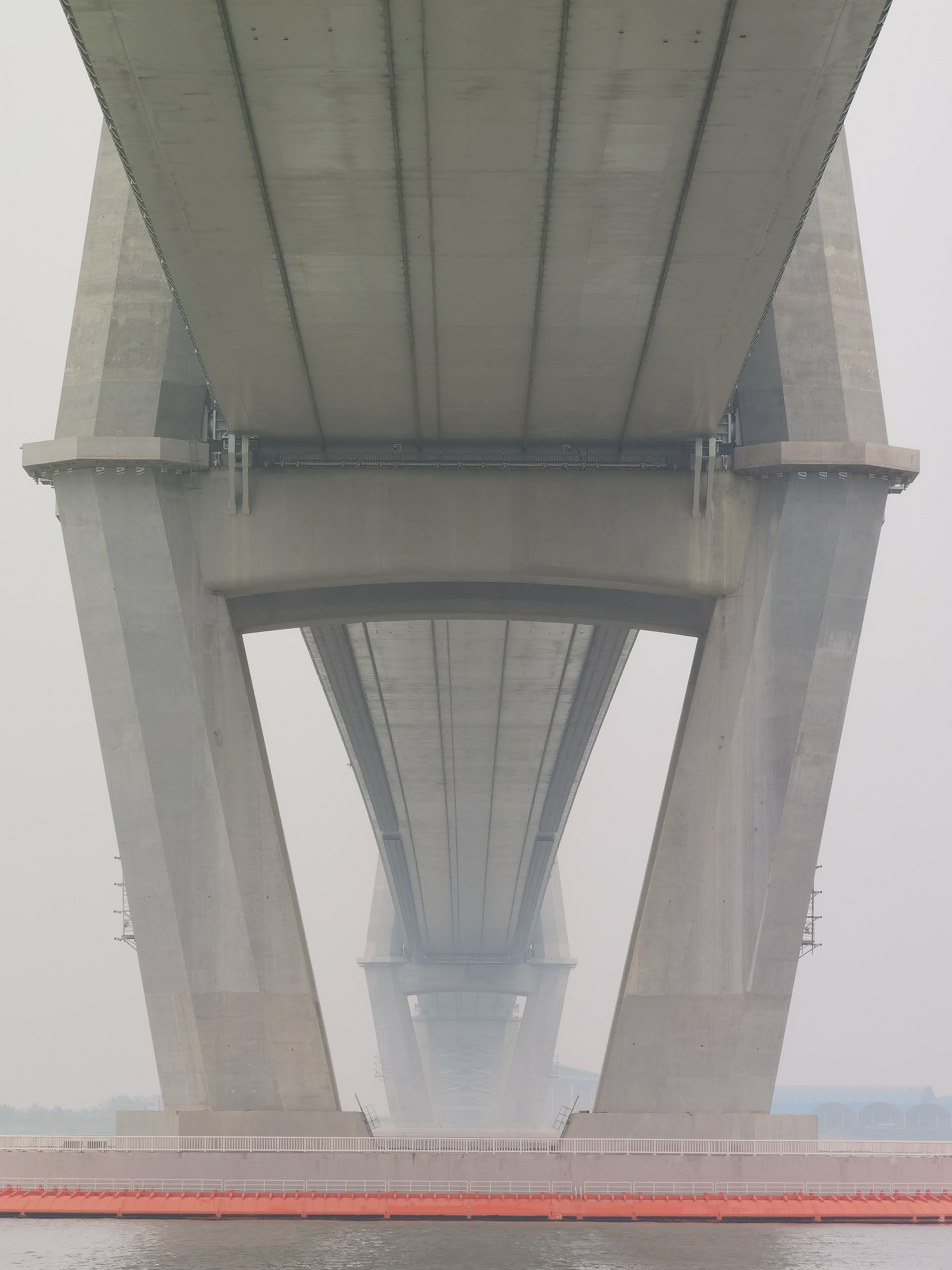

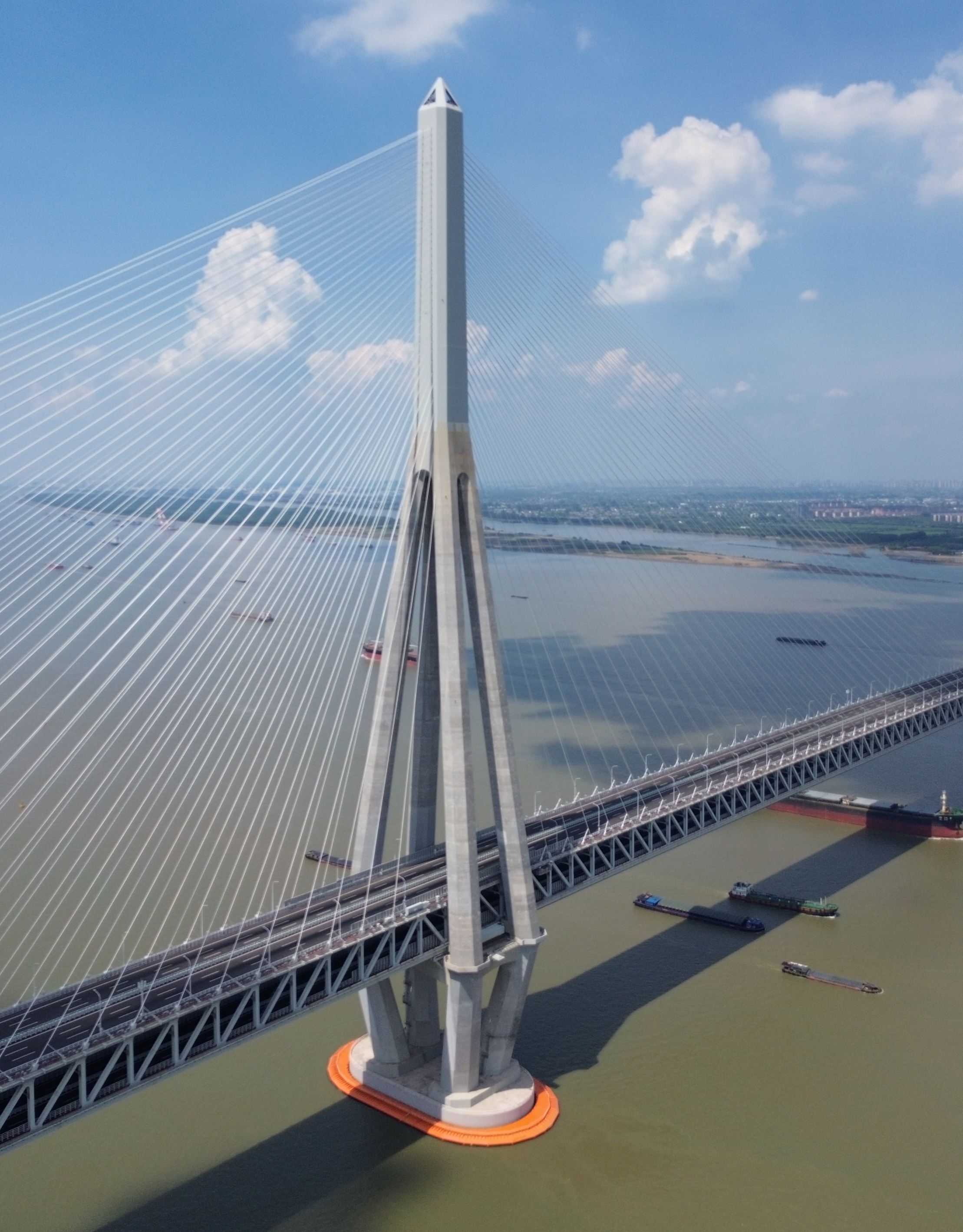

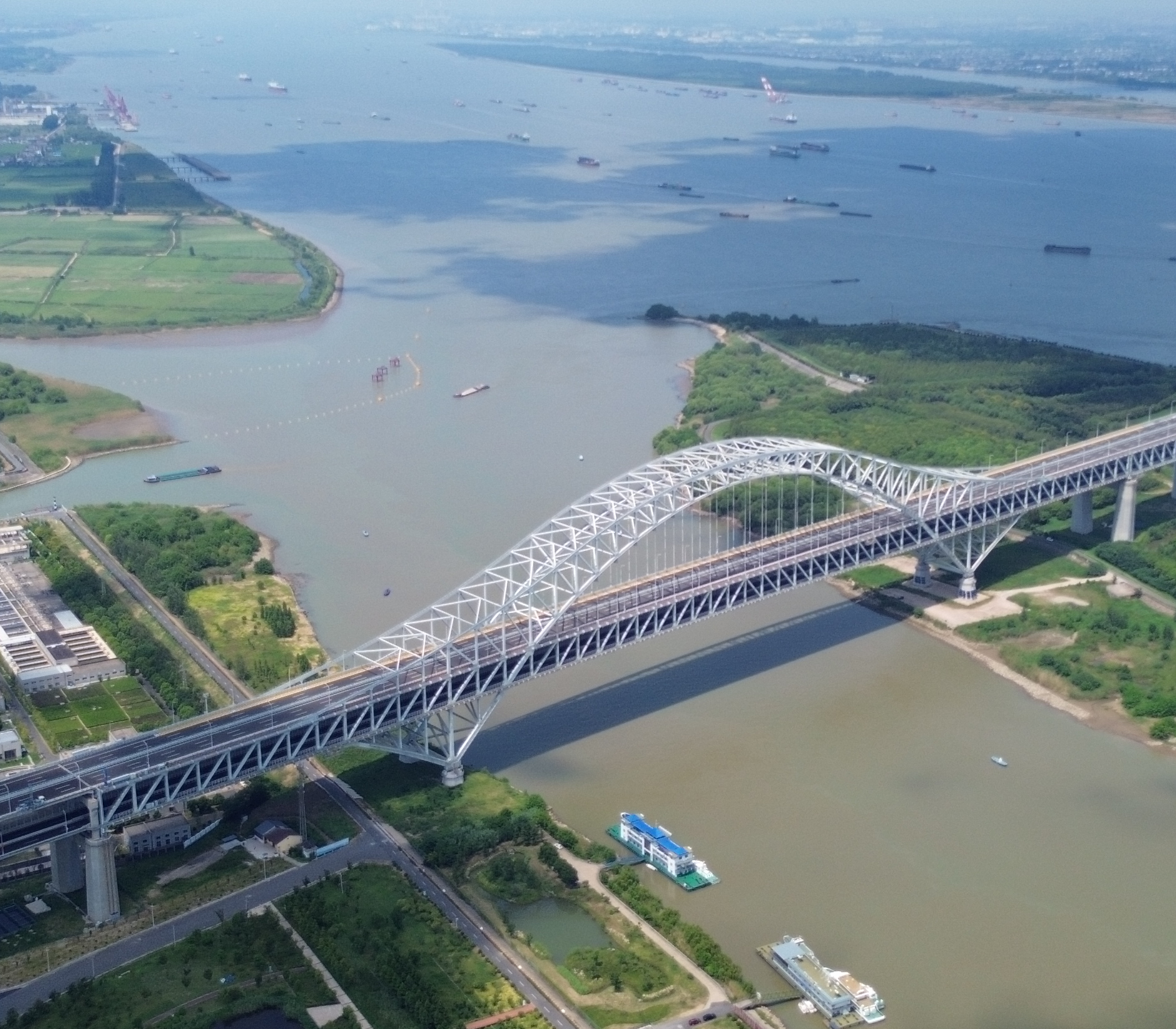

== See also ==
- Bridges and tunnels across the Yangtze River
- List of bridges in China
- List of longest cable-stayed bridge spans
- List of tallest bridges in the world
