= Sichuan-Tibet Railway Dadu River Bridge =

Sichuan-Tibet Railway Dadu River Bridge 川藏铁路大渡河特大桥
- Coordinates: 29°55′50″N 102°13′45″E
- Carries: Sichuan–Tibet railway
- Crosses: Dadu River
- Locale: Luding County, Sichuan

Characteristics
- Design: Suspension
- Material: Steel, concrete
- Total length: 1,280 m (4,200 ft)
- Height: 256 m (840 ft) (east tower); 144 m (472 ft) (west tower)
- Longest span: 1,060 m (3,480 ft)
- Clearance below: 380 m (1,250 ft)

History
- Construction end: 2028

Location
- Interactive map of Sichuan-Tibet Railway Dadu River Bridge

The Sichuan-Tibet Railway Dadu River Bridge (Chinese: 川藏铁路大渡河特大桥), is a suspension bridge over the Dadu River in Luding County, Sichuan, China. The bridge is one of the longest suspension bridges with a main span of 1,060 m (3,480 ft).

== See also ==
- Luding Bridge
- Xingkang Bridge
- Sichuan-Tibet Railway Nu River Bridge
- List of bridges in China
- List of longest suspension bridge spans
- List of highest bridges
