= Sichuan-Tibet Railway Nu River Bridge =

Sichuan-Tibet Railway Nu River Bridge 川藏铁路怒江特大桥
- Coordinates: 30°27′28″N 96°39′58″E
- Carries: Sichuan–Tibet railway
- Crosses: Nu River
- Locale: Pasho County, Tibet Autonomous Region

Characteristics
- Design: Suspension
- Material: Steel, concrete
- Total length: 1,200 m (3,900 ft)
- Longest span: 1,040 m (3,410 ft)

Location
- Interactive map of Sichuan-Tibet Railway Nu River Bridge

The Sichuan-Tibet Railway Nu River Bridge (Chinese: 川藏铁路怒江特大桥), is a suspension bridge under construction over the Salween River (known as the Nu Jiang or Nu River in China) in Pasho County, Tibet Autonomous Region, China. The bridge is one of the longest suspension bridges with a main span of 1,040 m (3,410 ft).

== See also ==
- Nu River Bridge
- Sichuan-Tibet Railway Dadu River Bridge
- List of bridges in China
- List of longest suspension bridge spans
- List of highest bridges
