= Taihu (disambiguation) =

Taihu freshwater lake on the borders of Jiangsu and Zhejiang provinces in China.

Taihu may also refer to:

== Places in China ==
- Taihu, Beijing (台湖镇)
- Taihu, Jiangsu (太湖街道), Binhu, Wuxi
- Taihu, Zhuzhou, a village in Hunan Province
- Taihu County (太湖县), Anhui Province

== Other uses ==
- Taihu Bridge, a bridge in Suzhou, Jiangsu, China
- Taihu pig, a domestic breed of pig
- Taihu stone, a kind of limestone

== See also ==
- Taihu Square station, on the Wuxi Metro
- Taihu Wu, a Wu Chinese language
