= Nu River Bridge =

Nu River Bridge 怒江四线特大桥
- Coordinates: 24.7505°N 98.9467°E
- Carries: Dali–Ruili railway
- Crosses: Nu River
- Locale: Yunnan, China
- Official name: 怒江四线特大桥

Characteristics
- Design: Arch bridge
- Material: Steel
- Total length: 1,024 m (3,360 ft)
- Width: 24.9 m (82 ft)
- Longest span: 490 m (1,610 ft)
- Clearance below: 212 m (696 ft)

History
- Construction start: 2016
- Construction end: 30 December 2019
- Opened: Jun. 2025

Location
- Interactive map of Nu River Bridge

Nu River Bridge (simplified Chinese: 怒江桥; traditional Chinese: 怒江橋; pinyin: Nù Jiāng Qiáo) is a railroad bridge part of the Dali–Ruili railway in China's Yunnan province. It is 1,024 metres (0.636 mi) long. Construction started January 24, 2016. The steel truss arch bridge has a main span of 490 meters and a total length of 1024 meters, with the bridge deck being 212 meters above the Nu River.

== See also ==
- Sichuan-Tibet Railway Nu River Bridge
- List of bridges in China
- List of longest arch bridge spans
- List of highest bridges
