= Aizhai Bridge =

Aizhai Bridge 矮寨大桥
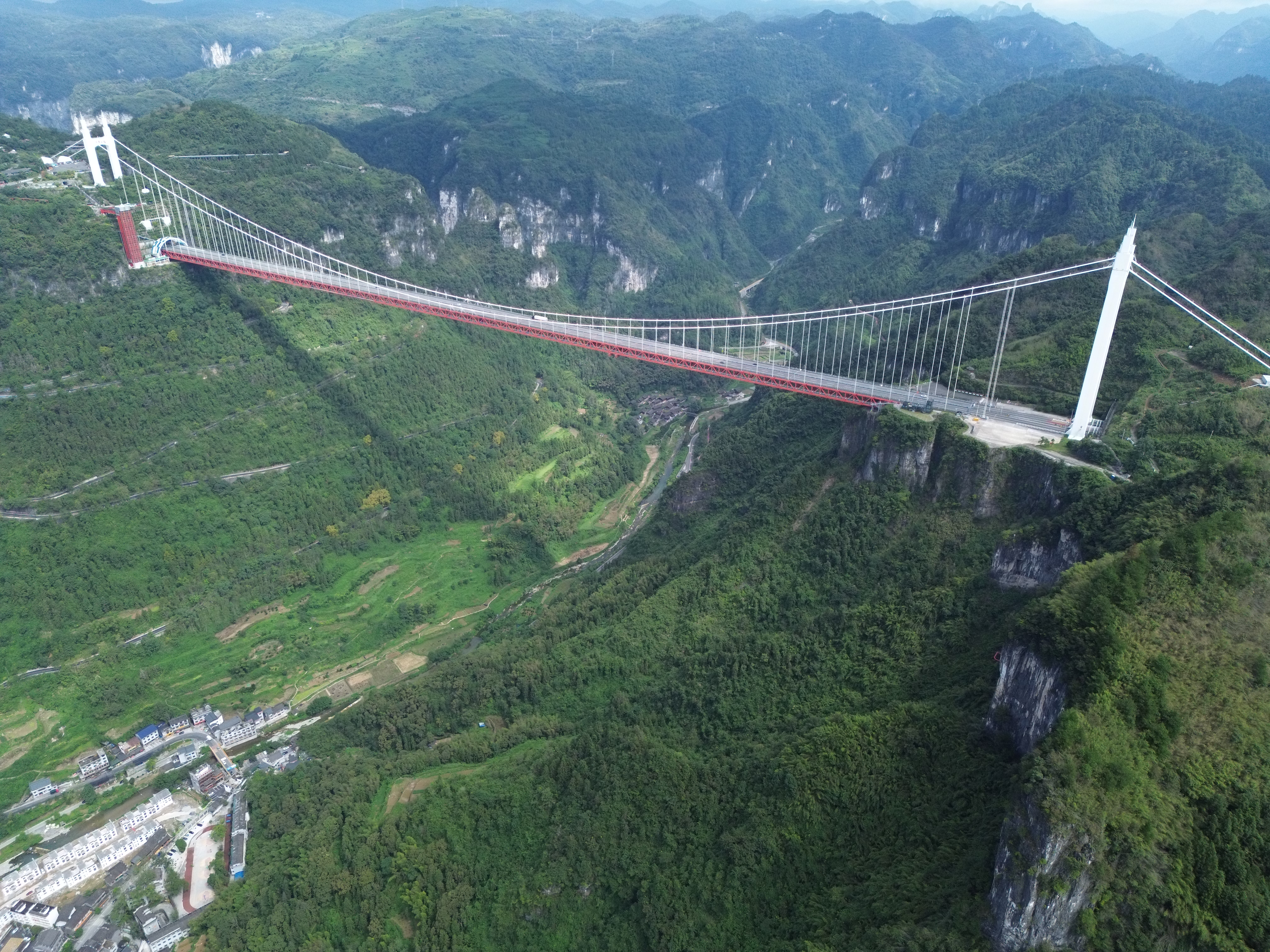
- Coordinates: 28.331°N 109.5974°E
- Carries: 4 lanes of G65 Baotou–Maoming Expressway
- Crosses: Dehang Grand Canyon (德夯大峡谷)
- Locale: Jishou

Characteristics
- Design: Suspension bridge
- Total length: 1,534 m (5,033 ft)
- Width: 24.5 m (80 ft)
- Longest span: 1,176 m (3,858 ft)
- Clearance below: 336 m (1,102 ft)

History
- Construction start: October 2007
- Construction end: December 2011
- Opened: 31 March 2012

Location
- Interactive map of Aizhai Bridge

The Aizhai Bridge (Chinese: 矮寨大桥) is a suspension bridge on the G65 Baotou–Maoming Expressway near Jishou, Hunan, China. The bridge was built as part of an expressway from southwest China's Chongqing Municipality to Changsha.

The bridge is famous for the view it offers those crossing it.

With a main span of 1,176 metres (3,858 ft) and a deck height of 336 metres (1,102 ft), as of 2013, it is the thirteenth-highest bridge in the world and the world's nineteenth-longest suspension bridge. Of the world's 400 or so highest bridges, none has a main span as long as Aizhai. It is also the world's highest and longest tunnel-to-tunnel bridge. The bridge contains 1888 lights to increase visibility at night.

Construction on the Aizhai Bridge began in October 2007 and was completed by the end of 2011, ahead of schedule. The bridge was temporarily opened to pedestrians during the 2012 Spring Festival and was formally opened to traffic in March 2012.

The bridge was built with the assistance of a $208 million loan from the Asian Development Bank; the total project cost was $610 million, which included 64 kilometres (40 mi) of expressway construction (two thirds of which comprised bridge and tunnel) and upgrades to 129 kilometres (80 mi) of local roads. The bridge and the associated road construction were projected to reduce the travel time between Jishou and Chadong from 4 hours to less than 1 hour.

In September 2012, the Aizhai Bridge was the site of an international BASE jumping festival that included more than 40 jumpers from 13 countries.

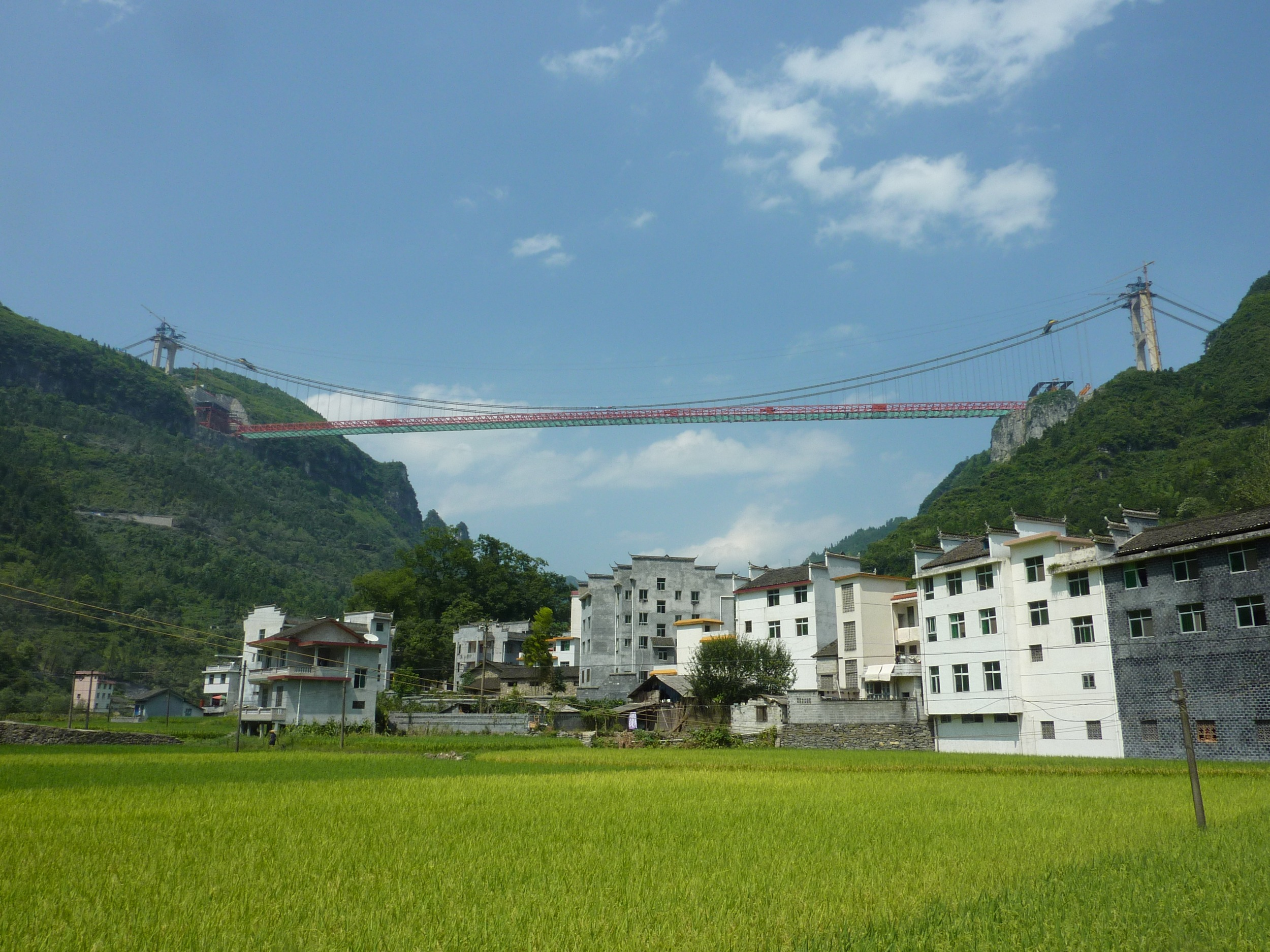

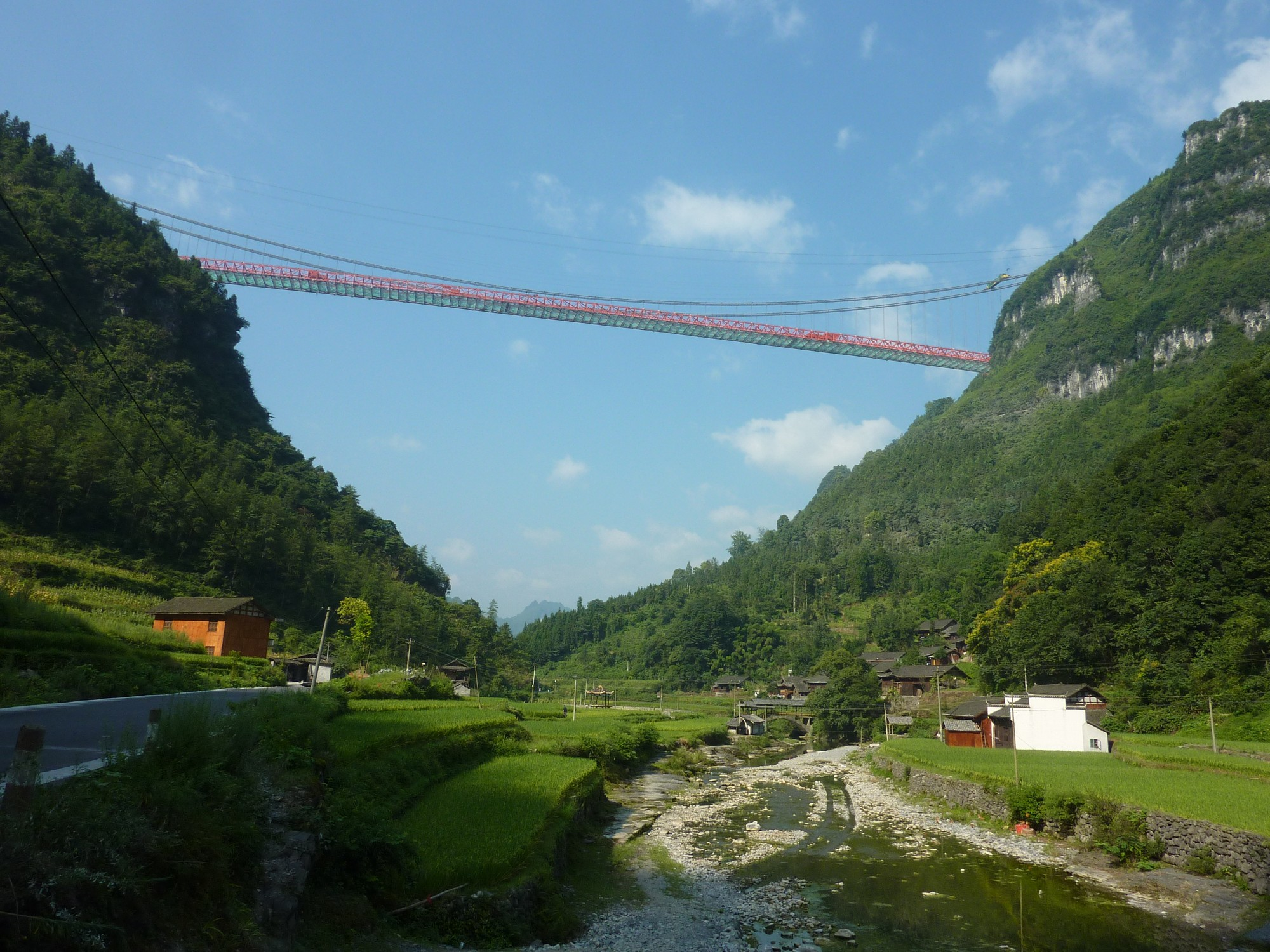

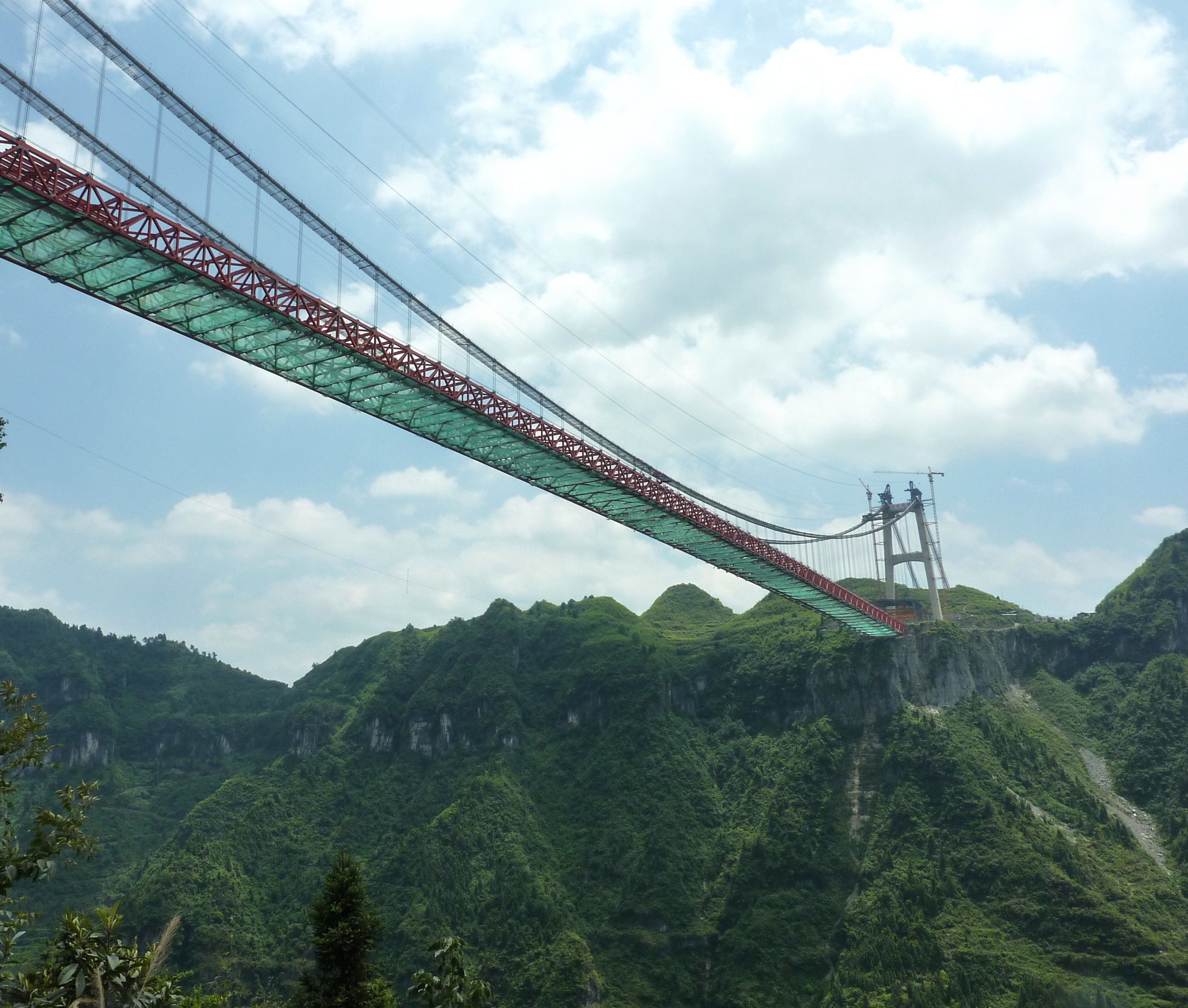

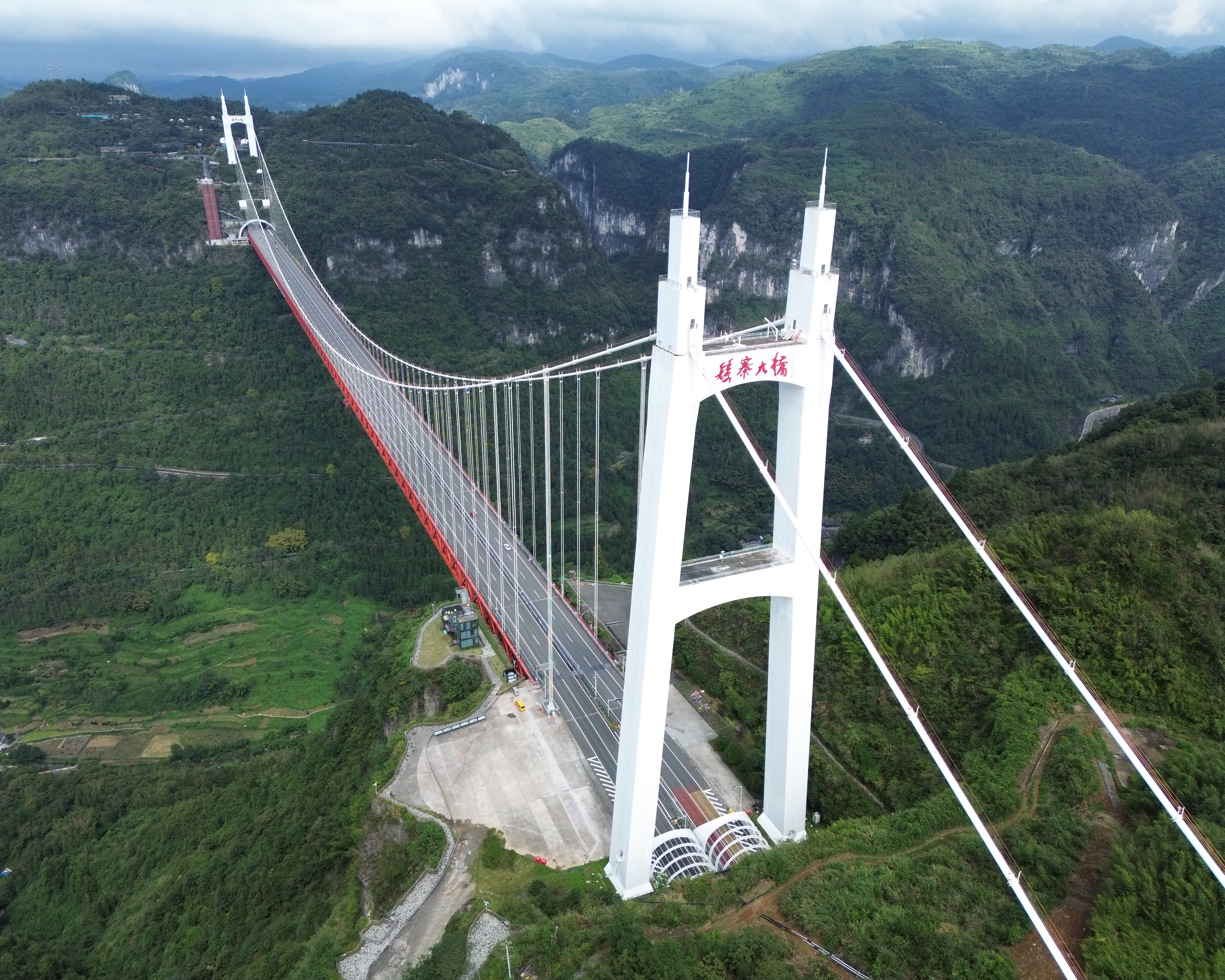

== See also ==
- List of bridges in China
- List of highest bridges in the world
- List of longest suspension bridge spans
