= Longjiang Bridge =

Bridge in People's Republic of China

Longjiang Bridge 龙江特大桥
- Longjiang Bridge of Baoteng Expressway in Yunnan Province
- Coordinates: 24.8388°N 98.6722°E
- Carries: S10 Baoteng Expressway
- Crosses: Long River
- Locale: Baoshan, Yunnan, Yunnan, China

Characteristics
- Design: Suspension bridge
- Material: Steel
- Total length: 2,471 m (8,107 ft)
- Width: 33.5 m (110 ft)
- Height: 169.7 m (557 ft)
- Longest span: 1,196 m (3,924 ft)
- Clearance below: 280 m (920 ft)

History
- Construction start: August 2, 2011
- Construction end: April 5, 2016
- Opened: May 1, 2016

Location
- Interactive map of Longjiang Bridge

The Long River Bridge or Longjiang Bridge (龙江特大桥) is a suspension bridge near Baoshan, Yunnan, China. The main span of the bridge is 1,196 m (3,924 ft) making it one of the longest ever built. The bridge is also one of the highest in world sitting 280 m (920 ft) above the river below. The bridge started construction on August 2, 2011, completed construction in April 2016, and was opened to the public on May 1, 2016.

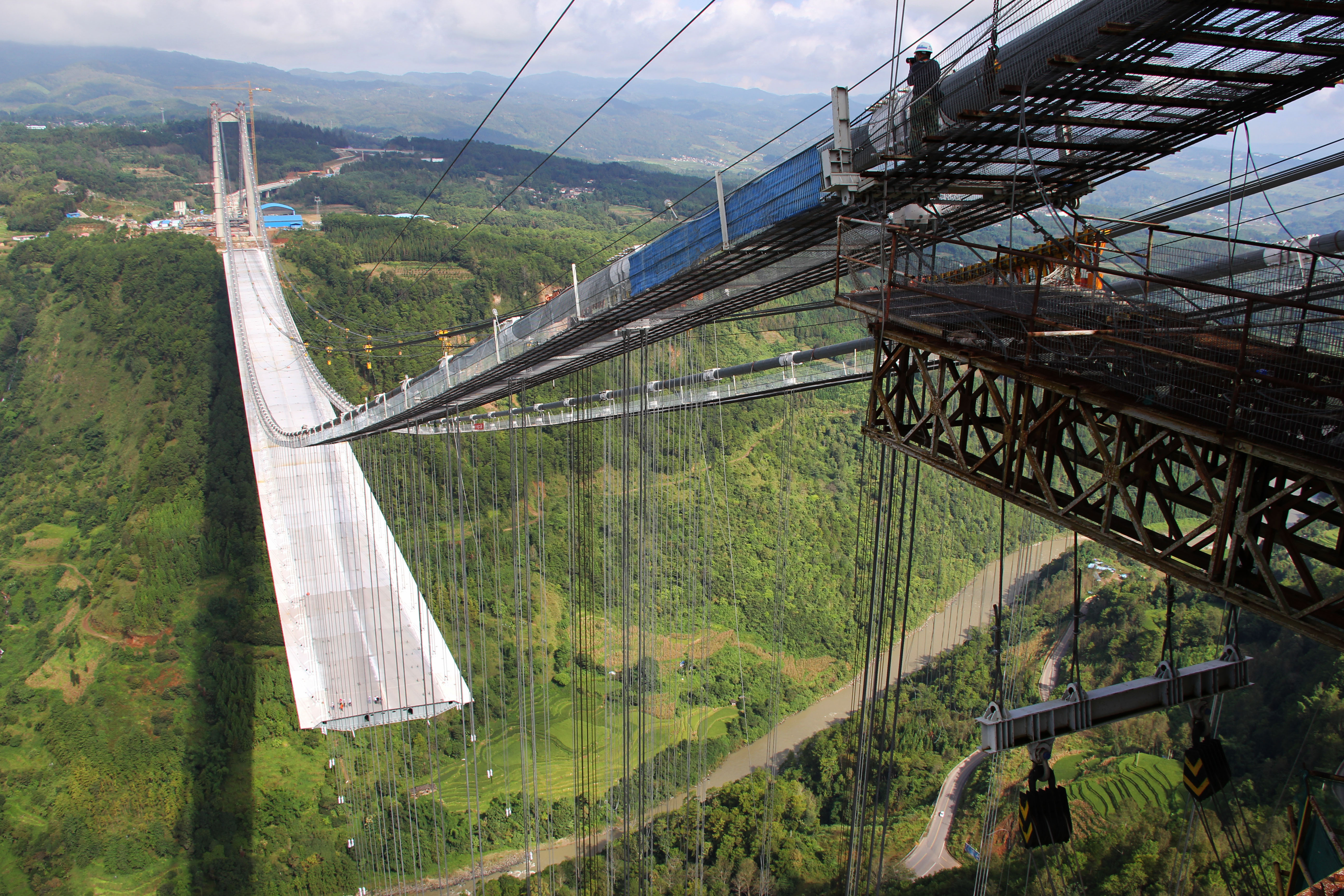
Longjiang Bridge under construction (2015)

The project cost around 1.96 billion Yuan (Roughly 272 million USD).

== Geography ==
The bridge is part of S10 Baoshan–Tengchong Expressway, connecting the cities of Baoshan and Tengchong in southwest China, and going straight to Myanmar. It crosses the Long River Valley, the largest natural obstacle on the Baoteng Expressway. Prior to the bridge, going from Baoshan to Tengchong involves a 13.5 km (8.4 mi) detour down to the valley floor.

== See also ==
- List of bridges in China
- List of highest bridges
- List of longest suspension bridge spans
