= Nansha Bridge =

Bridge over the Pearl River in Guangdong

Nansha Bridge 南沙大桥
- Coordinates: 22°53′22″N 113°32′12″E
- Carries: Guangzhou–Longchuan Expy
- Crosses: Pearl River
- Locale: Dongguan–Guangzhou, Guangdong, China

Characteristics
- Design: Suspension bridge
- Total length: 12,891 m (42,293 ft)
- Width: 54 m (177 ft)
- Height: Nizhou Waterway Bridge: 260 m (850 ft)
- Longest span: Dasha Waterway Bridge: 1,200 m (3,900 ft); Nizhou Waterway Bridge: 1,688 m (5,538 ft)
- No. of lanes: 8

History
- Constructed by: China Communications Construction Ltd. Guangdong Provincial ChangDa Highway Engineering Co. Ltd.
- Construction start: 28 June 2013
- Construction cost: CN¥ 12 billion
- Opened: 2 April 2019

Location
- Interactive map of Nansha Bridge

The Nansha Bridge (simplified Chinese: 南沙大桥; traditional Chinese: 南沙大橋; pinyin: Nánshā Dàqiáo) is a set of two suspension bridges located in Guangdong, China, spanning the Pearl River. It is also the beginning of the Guangzhou–Longchuan Expressway. While it was under construction, it was due to be named the Humen Second Bridge (Chinese : 虎门二桥)

== Description ==
The bridge is an important part of the Pearl River Delta expressway network, connecting the Shatian Town in Dongguan to Nansha District in Guangzhou, as well as the Guangzhou Ring Expressway and the Guangshen Yanjiang Expressway.

The Nansha Bridge opened to traffic on 2 April 2019.

== See also ==
- List of bridges in China
- List of longest suspension bridge spans
