= List of bridges in Fujian =

This is a list of bridges in Fujian, China.

== Bridges ==
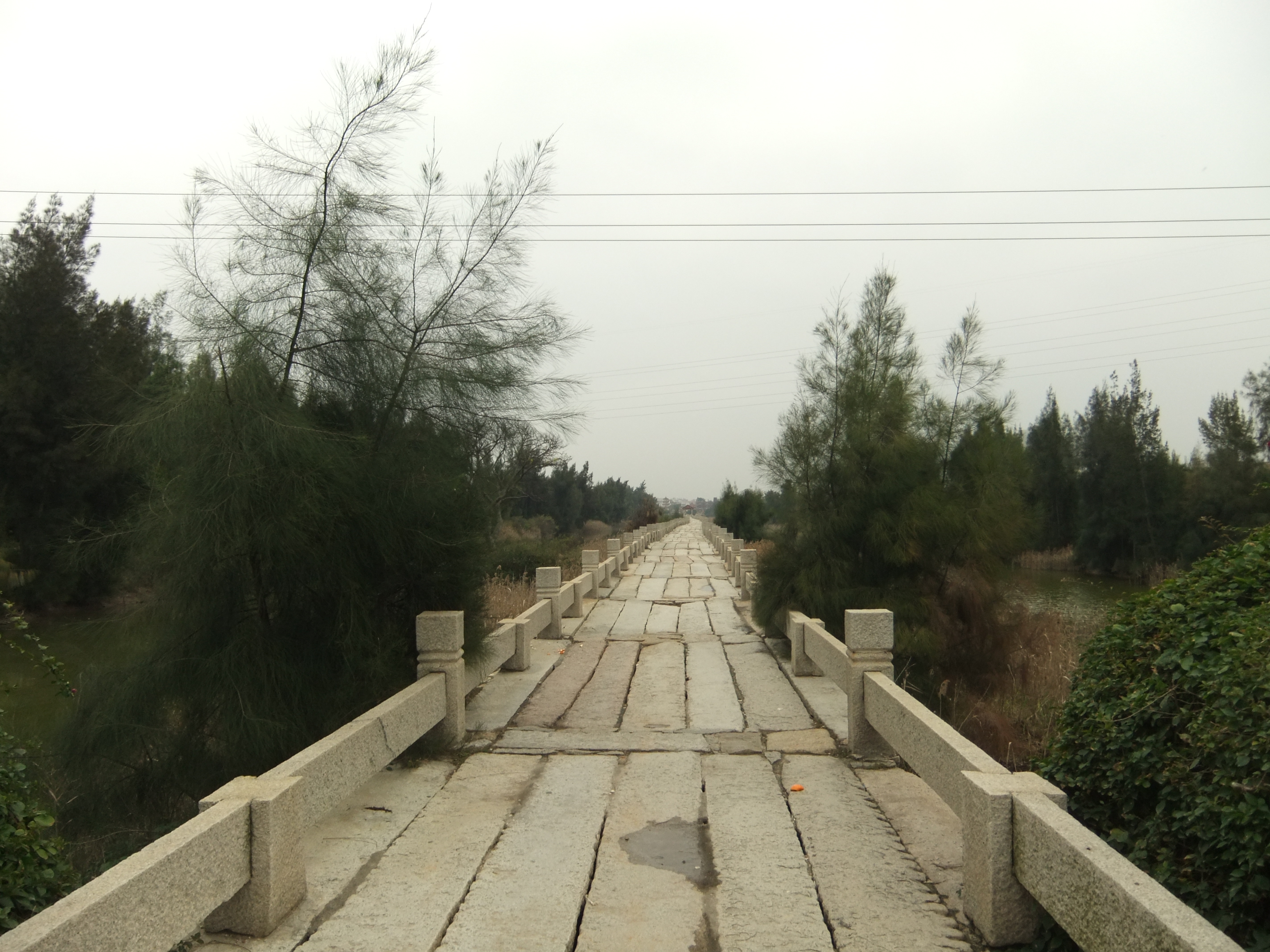
The Anping Bridge in the Quanzhou prefecture

- Anping Bridge
- Gushan Bridge
- Haicang Bridge
- Huai'an Bridge (Fuzhou)
- Jin River Bridge
- Langqi Minjiang Bridge
- Qingzhou Bridge
- Sanxianzhou Bridge
- Slab bridge
- Tianchi Bridge
- Wuyuan Bridge
- Xiabaishi Bridge
- Xiamen Zhangzhou Bridge
- Xingduicha Bridge
- Wan'an Bridge

== See also ==
- List of bridges in China
