= Nanxi Bridge =

Nanxi Bridge 南溪长江大桥
- Coordinates: 28.783694°N 104.945694°E
- Carries: G93 Chengdu–Chongqing Ring Expressway
- Crosses: Yangtze River
- Locale: Nanxi District, Yibin, Sichuan, China

Characteristics
- Design: Suspension Bridge
- Material: Steel
- Total length: 1,295 metres (4,249 ft)
- Longest span: 820 metres (2,690 ft)

History
- Construction end: 2013
- Construction cost: 660 million RMB

Location
- Interactive map of Nanxi Bridge

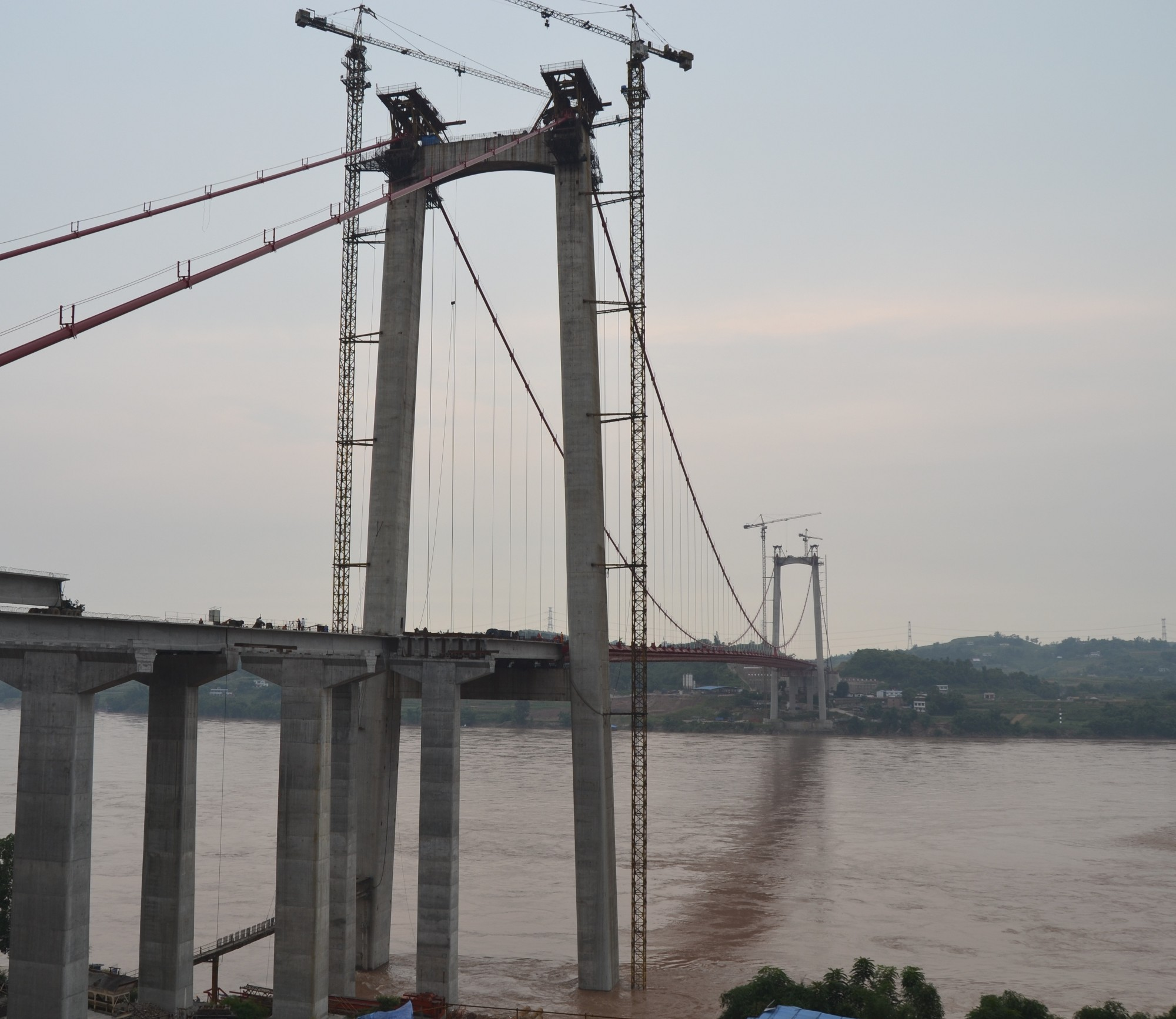
under construction

The Nanxi Bridge (Chinese: 南溪长江大桥) is a suspension bridge over the Yangtze River in Nanxi District, Yibin, Sichuan, China. It is one of the longest suspension bridges in the world with a span of 820 m (2,690 ft). The bridge carries traffic on the G93 Chengdu–Chongqing Ring Expressway and cost 660 million RMB.

== See also ==
- Yangtze River bridges and tunnels
- List of longest suspension bridge spans
- List of largest bridges in China
