= Yanji Yangtze River Bridge =

Chinese suspended bridge

Yanji Yangtze River Bridge 燕矶长江大桥
- The bridge under construction in 2025
- Coordinates: 30°24′26″N 114°59′11″E
- Crosses: Yangtze
- Locale: Huanggang–Ezhou

Characteristics
- Design: Two levels suspension bridge with 4 main cables
- Material: Steel, concrete
- Height: 184 m (604 ft)
- Longest span: 1,860 m (6,102 ft)

History
- Constructed by: China Communications Construction Company (CCCC)
- Construction start: 2021
- Opened: 2026

Location
- Interactive map of Yanji Yangtze River Bridge

The Yanji Yangtze River Bridge (Chinese: 燕矶长江大桥) is an under construction suspension bridge over the Yangtze, China.

== Locale ==
The Yanji Yangtze River Bridge is located 6.7 kilometers downstream from the Ehuang Yangtze River Bridge. It borders Huangzhou District, Huanggang City, to the north, and Yanji City, Ezhou City, to the south.

== Description ==
The preliminary design of the bridge was approved in 2021 and the bridge is expected to be completed in 2025. In December 2024, after the completion of the towers, the laying of the cables was completed, with the deck still to be laid.

== See also ==
- Bridges and tunnels across the Yangtze River
- List of longest suspension bridge spans - Under construction
- List of bridges in China
