= Jin'an Bridge =

Jin'an Jinsha River Bridge 金安金沙江大桥
- Coordinates: 26°49′20″N 100°26′30″E
- Carries: G4216 Chengdu–Lijiang Expressway
- Crosses: Jinsha River
- Locale: Lijiang, Yunnan, China

Characteristics
- Design: Suspension
- Material: Steel
- Total length: 1,678 m (5,505 ft)
- Height: 230 m (750 ft)
- Longest span: 1,386 m (4,547 ft)
- Clearance above: 461 m (1,512 ft)

History
- Construction start: 2016
- Opened: 31 December 2020

Location
- Interactive map of Jin'an Jinsha River Bridge

The Jin'an Jinsha River Bridge (Chinese: 金安金沙江大桥) is a suspension bridge near Lijiang, Yunnan, China. At 461 m (1,512 ft), it is the 5th highest bridge in the world. The bridge forms part of the G4216 Chengdu–Lijiang Expressway carrying traffic over the Jinsha River. The bridge construction began in 2016, the structure closed in January 2020 and it opened for traffic on 31 December 2020. The main span of the bridge is 1,386 m (4,547 ft).

The bridge crosses the river 1.4 km upstream from the Jin'anqiao Dam. Due to the formation of the reservoir behind the dam, the full clearance to the original river level will not be visible.

== Original design ==
The original design of the expressway crossed the Jinsha River 30 km (30,000 m) 20 km downstream at the village of Taku. The Taku Bridge was also a suspension bridge design. The original design was slightly higher crossing 512 m (1,680 ft) above the river and slightly shorter with a main span of the bridge 1,190 m (3,900 ft).

G4216 Chengdu–Lijiang Expressway

== Others ==
The Jin'an Bridge (金安大桥) is a local bridge located nearby (2km) this suspension bridge which was built before 2000, and part of G353.

== See also ==
- List of bridges in China
- Bridges and tunnels across the Yangtze River
- List of highest bridges in the world
- List of longest suspension bridge spans
