= Baoshan–Tengchong Expressway =

Road in Yunnan, China

Baoshan–Tengchong Expressway
- 天保－猴桥高速公路
- Baoshan–Tengchong Expressway 保山—腾冲高速公路; Baoteng Expressway 保腾高速
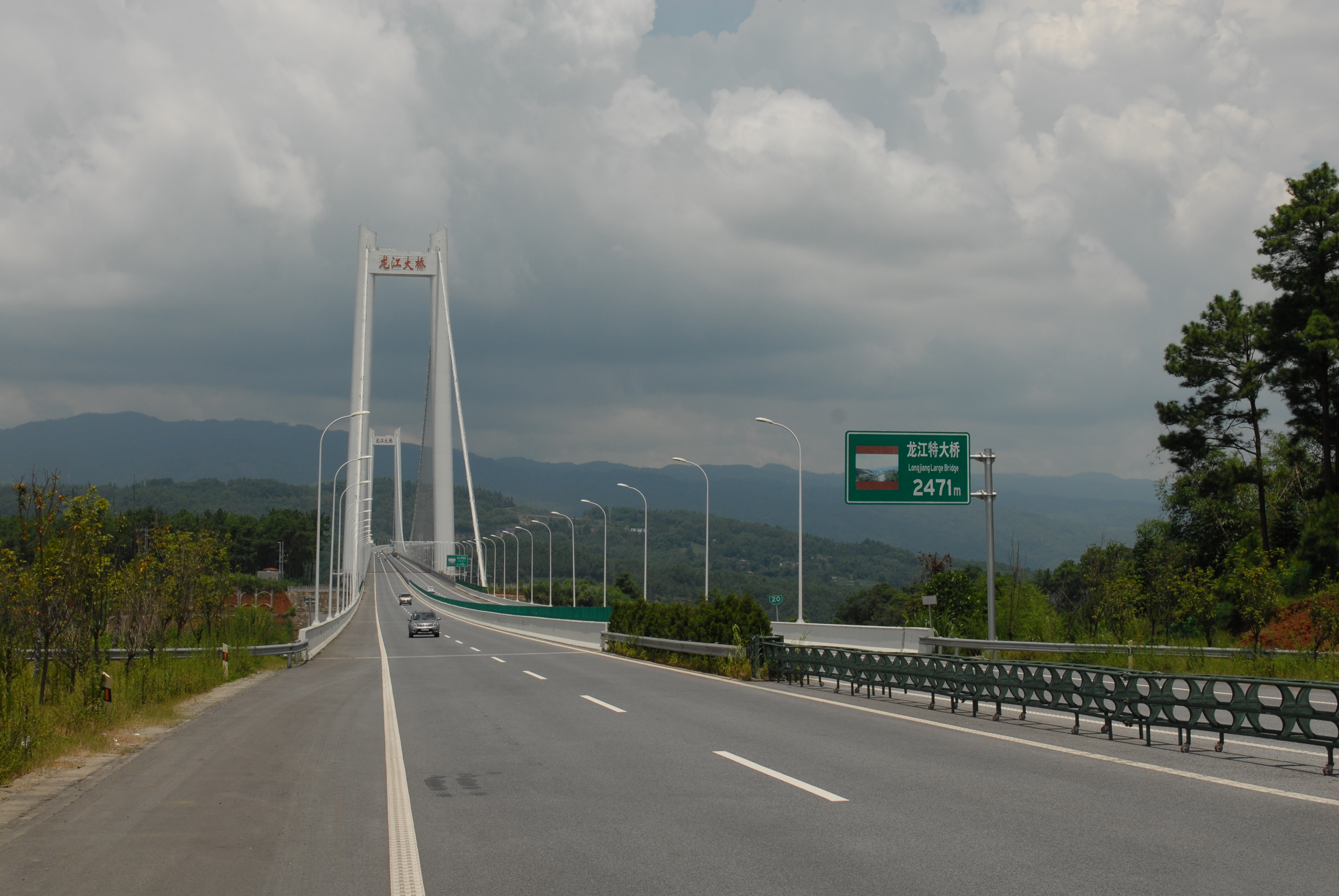
- Longjiang Bridge

Route information
- Length: 63.86 km (39.68 mi)
- Existed: 20 April 2016–present

Major junctions
- South end: G56 Hangzhou–Ruili Expressway Zhen'an
- North end: Tengchong–Houqiao Expressway and Tengchong–Longchuan Expressway, terminus at Zhonghe Tengchong City

Location
- Country: China
- Province: Yunnan

Highway system
- National Trunk Highway System; Primary; Auxiliary; National Highways; Transport in China

Baoshan–Tengchong Expressway also known as Baoteng Expressway is a national-level expressway in Yunnan, China, part of G5615 Tianbao–Houqiao Expressway. It connects the city of Baoshan and Tengchong. The expressway was built between 2007 and 2016. The key project of the expressway is a bridge named Longjiang Bridge, one of the highest in the world sitting 280 m (920 ft) above the Long River below. The total cost of the expressway is approximately 4.6 billion Yuan, about 71.97 million Yuan per kilometer. It is also the first expressway built in a volcano area in China.

The expressway was an independent Yunnan provincial expressway with code S10; it was merged into the G5615 Tianbao–Houqiao Expressway in the National Road Network Plan 2022.
