= Labajin Bridge =

Labajin Bridge 腊八斤特大桥
- Coordinates: 29.692°N 102.813°E
- Carries: G5 Beijing–Kunming Expressway
- Locale: Yingjing, Sichuan, China

Characteristics
- Design: Beam Bridge
- Material: Concrete
- Height: 182.6 metres (599 ft)
- Longest span: 200 metres (660 ft)
- Clearance above: 229 metres (751 ft)

History
- Opened: 2012

Labajin Bridge is a 229-metre-high (751 ft) concrete beam bridge near Yingjing in Sichuan, China. As of 2019, it is among the sixty highest bridges in the world. The bridge is located on G5 Beijing–Kunming Expressway.

== See also ==
- List of highest bridges in the world
- List of tallest bridges in the world
