= Xingkang Bridge =

Xingkang Bridge 泸定大渡河特大桥
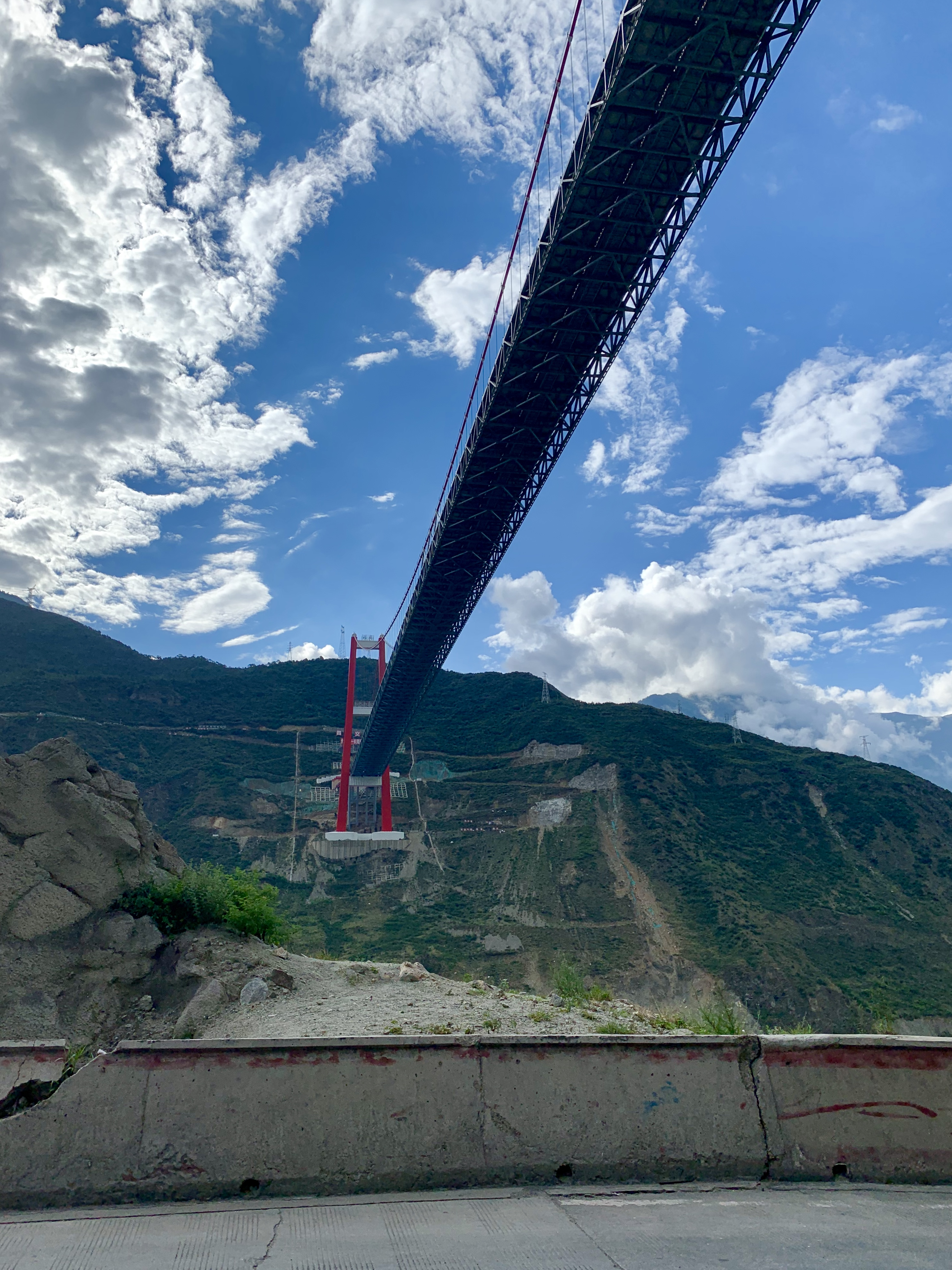
- Coordinates: 29.9654°N 102.2149°E
- Carries: G4218 Ya'an–Kargilik Expressway
- Crosses: Dadu River
- Locale: Luding County, Sichuan, China

Characteristics
- Design: Suspension
- Material: Steel
- Height: 188 m (617 ft)
- Longest span: 1,100 m (3,600 ft)
- Clearance above: 285 m (935 ft)

History
- Opened: 2018

Location
- Interactive map of Xingkang Bridge

The Xingkang Bridge or Luding Yaye Expressway Bridge as is a suspension bridge in Luding County, Sichuan, China that opened in 2018. The 285 m (935 ft) high deck is one of the highest in world. The bridge forms part of the G4218 Ya'an–Kargilik Expressway carrying traffic over the Dadu River. The bridge began construction in 2014 and opened in 2018. The main span of the bridge is 1,100 m (3,600 ft) making it one of the longest ever built.

The bridge is located just 2 kilometres upstream from the Luding Dam and crosses the reservoir formed by the dam. Although the bridge is 285 metres above the original river the bridge sits 235 metres above the reservoir. The bridge was constructed as part of the new expressway from Ya'an to Kangding massively reducing travel times in the area.

== See also ==
- Luding Bridge
- Sichuan-Tibet Railway Dadu River Bridge
- List of bridges in China
- List of longest suspension bridge spans
- List of highest bridges
