= Fuyuan Road Bridge =

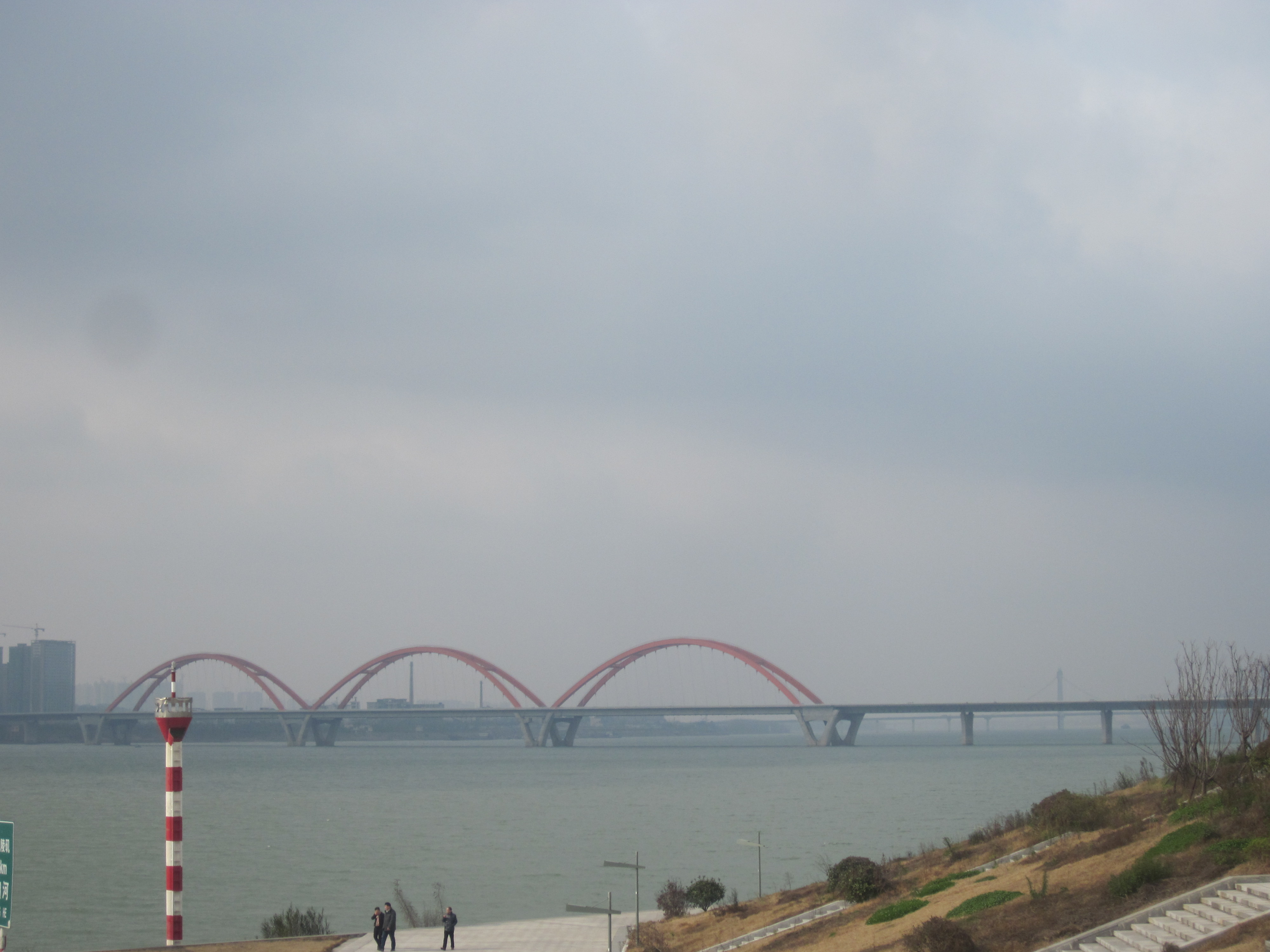
- Fuyuan Road Bridge
- Coordinates: 28°15′32″N 112°59′02″E
- Carries: Motor vehicles, pedestrians and bicycles
- Crosses: Xiang River
- Locale: Kaifu District/Yuelu District, Changsha, Hunan, China
- Maintained by: Department of Transportation, Changsha Government

Characteristics
- Design: Arch bridge Beam bridge
- Material: Concrete, steel
- Total length: 3,575 m (11,729 ft)
- Width: 38.5 m (126 ft)

History
- Construction start: 27 September 2010
- Construction end: 18 May 2012
- Opened: 20 November 2012

Chinese name
- Traditional Chinese: 福元路大橋
- Simplified Chinese: 福元路大桥
Transcriptions
Standard Mandarin
- Hanyu Pinyin: Fúyuánlù Dàqiáo

Location
- Interactive map of Fuyuan Road Bridge

Fuyuan Road Bridge (Chinese: 福元路大桥) is a beam arch bridge crossing over the Xiang River in Changsha, Hunan, China. It connects Yuelu District and Kaifu District. It was made of steel and concrete. The bridge has six lanes, separated by a railing.

== History ==
Plans for a bridge had been made in 2008. Construction of the bridge started on September 27, 2010, and completed on May 18, 2012. It was put into operation on November 20, 2012.
