= List of bridges in China =

This list of bridges in China includes notable bridges. China has a long history in bridge construction. The oldest bridge still in existence in China is the Anji Bridge, constructed during the years between 595 and 605.

During the infrastructure boom of the past three decades, bridge-building has proceeded at a rapid pace on a vast scale. Prior to the completion of the Wuhan Yangtze River Bridge in 1957, there were no bridges across the Yangtze River, China's longest, from Yibin to Shanghai, and all overland roads and railways crossing this 2,884 km (1,792 mi.) stretch of the river had to be ferried. There were only seven such bridges in 1992, but that number reached 73 by the end of 2012, including eight new openings in that year alone.

China has been pushing the boundaries of bridge construction with many record breaking bridges, including:

- The Danyang–Kunshan Grand Bridge, the world's longest bridge measuring over 164 kilometres (102 mi).
- The Yangsigang Yangtze River Bridge in Wuhan, the third-longest suspension bridge span.
- The Hutong Yangtze River Bridge in Jiangsu province, the second-longest cable-stayed span.
- The Huajiang Canyon Bridge, opened on September 28, 2025, surpassed the Duge Bridge, as the highest bridge in the world.
- The Tian'e Longtan Bridge, opened on Feb 1, 2024, surpassed the Pingnan Third Bridge as the longest arch bridge span.

== Historical and architectural interest bridges ==
	Name	Chinese	Distinction	Length	Type	Carries Crosses	Opened	Location	Province	Ref.
1	Anji Bridge	安济桥	Oldest standing bridge in China; Oldest open-spandrel segmental stone arch bridge Span : 37.4 m (123 ft)	51 m (167 ft)	Masonry; 1 segmental arch	Xiao River	605	Zhao County; 37°43′12.8″N 114°45′47.8″E	Hebei	(Note: This title strictly applies only to the sum of attributes given (O’Connor, Colin: Roman Bridges, Cambridge University Press 1993, ISBN 0-521-39326-4, p.171): Various Roman stone pillar bridges featured wooden open-spandrel segmental arches as early as the 2nd century CE, among them Trajan's Bridge, the longest bridge of the world to have been built for over a thousand years. Also, a dozen or more Roman close-spandrel stone segmental arch bridges are known from the 1st century BC onwards, such as the Ponte San Lorenzo (Padua), Alconétar Bridge and the Makestos Bridge (Turkey), the last having half-open spandrels. The 27 segmental arches of the Bridge at Limyra (300 ce) feature span to rise ratios between 5.3 and 6.5 to 1, making it an earlier example of a stone quarter circle segmental arch bridge. This leaves the Anji bridge the title of "the oldest open-spandrel stone quarter circle segmental arch bridge in the world".)
2	Luoyang Bridge	洛阳桥	World Heritage Site	731 m (2,398 ft)	Clapper bridge 47 apertures	Luoyang River	1059	Luojiang District, Quanzhou; 24°57′17.0″N 118°40′34.8″E	Fujian	
3	Longjiang Bridge (Fuqing)	龙江桥		476 m (1,562 ft)	Clapper bridge 40 spans	Long River (Fujian)	1124	Fuqing; 25°41′39.1″N 119°27′09.9″E	Fujian	
4	Anping Bridge	安平桥	Longest bridge in China until 1905; World Heritage Site	2,070 m (6,790 ft)	Clapper bridge 331 spans	Shijing River	1151	Quanzhou; 24°42′36.4″N 118°26′37.5″E	Fujian	
5	Marco Polo Bridge	卢沟桥		266 m (873 ft)	Masonry; 11 segmental arches	Yongding River	1192	Fengtai District; 39°50′56.4″N 116°12′46.3″E	Beijing	
6	Guyue Bridge	古月桥		31 m (102 ft)	Masonry; 1 arch	Dragon Creek	1213	Yiwu; 29°09′44.4″N 120°04′20.5″E	Zhejiang	
7	Chushul Chakzam	曲水铁索桥	Conception by Thang Tong Gyalpo; Estimated span : 150 yd (140 m)		Suspension; Iron chains, masonry pylons	Footbridge; Yarlung Tsangpo	1430	Qüxü County; 29°19′38.3″N 90°41′09.6″E	Tibet	
8	Guangji Bridge (Chaozhou)	广济桥		518 m (1,699 ft)	Beam bridge Stone, 19 spans, 19 piers Pontoon bridge	Han River (Guangdong)	1435	Chaozhou; 23°39′55.2″N 116°39′00.8″E	Guangdong	
9	Precious Belt Bridge	宝带桥		317 m (1,040 ft)	Masonry; 53 semi-circular arches	Grand Canal; Tantai Lake	1446	Suzhou; 31°15′31.8″N 120°38′57.9″E	Jiangsu	
10	Xianju Bridge	仙居桥		42 m (138 ft)	Covered bridge Wood		1452	Taishun County; 27°34′40.4″N 119°45′06.7″E	Zhejiang	
11	Xidong Bridge	溪东桥		42 m (138 ft)	Covered bridge Wood		1570	Taishun County; 27°28′17.2″N 119°59′52.9″E	Zhejiang	
12	Free Life Bridge	放生桥		71 m (233 ft)	Masonry; 5 semi-circular arches	Footbridge; Caogangjiang	1571	Zhujiajiao; 31°06′48.9″N 121°03′05.1″E	Shanghai	
13	Luding Bridge	泸定桥	Span : 104 m (341 ft)	104 m (341 ft)	Suspension; Iron chains, masonry pylons	Footbridge; Dadu River	1706	Luding County; 29°54′52.2″N 102°13′48.7″E	Sichuan	
14	Xijin Bridge	西津桥		166 m (545 ft)	Covered bridge Wood, masonry piers, 13 spans	Yongkang River	1718	Yongkang; 28°53′53.2″N 120°01′17.4″E	Zhejiang	
15	Five-Pavilion Bridge	五亭桥			Masonry; 1 main semi-circular arch	Footbridge; Slender West Lake	1757	Yangzhou; 32°24′35.1″N 119°24′58.1″E	Jiangsu	
16	Jade Belt Bridge	玉带桥	Moon bridge Summer Palace; World Heritage Site		Masonry; 1 pointed arch	Footbridge; Kunming Lake	1764	Beijing; 39°59′31.7″N 116°15′39.8″E	Beijing	
17	Xiuyi Bridge	绣漪桥	Moon bridge Summer Palace; World Heritage Site		Masonry; 1 pointed arch	Footbridge; Kunming Lake		Beijing; 39°58′48.8″N 116°16′25.7″E	Beijing	
18	Seventeen Arch Bridge	十七拱桥	Summer Palace; World Heritage Site	150 m (490 ft)	Masonry; 17 semi-circular arches	Kunming Lake	1764	Beijing; 39°59′22.3″N 116°16′17.0″E	Beijing	
19	Shuanglong Bridge	双龙桥		148 m (486 ft)	Masonry; 17 pointed arches	Lujiang-Tachong	1839	Jianshui County; 23°36′30.5″N 102°47′34.2″E	Yunnan	
20	Faux Namti Bridge	五家寨铁路桥		67 m (220 ft)	Arch; Steel deck arch	Kunming–Haiphong railway Sicha River	1908	Pingbian County; 23°13′09.9″N 103°45′19.4″E	Yunnan	
21	Yalu River Broken Bridge	鸭绿江断桥	China–North Korea border	944 m (3,097 ft)	Truss; Steel; Swing bridge	Railway bridge Yalu River	1911	Dandong–Sinuiju; 40°06′52.4″N 124°23′30.9″E	Liaoning; Democratic People's Republic of Korea	
22	Chengyang Bridge	程阳永济桥		64 m (210 ft)	Covered bridge Wood, masonry piers	Linxin River	1916	Sanjiang County; 25°54′01.6″N 109°38′16.9″E	Guangxi	
23	Qiantang River Bridge	钱塘江大桥		1,453 m (4,767 ft)	Truss; Steel, 2 levels	Road bridge Railway bridge Qiantang River	1937	Hangzhou; 30°11′42.4″N 120°08′04.6″E	Zhejiang	
24	Sino-Korean Friendship Bridge	中朝友谊桥	China–North Korea border	941 m (3,087 ft)	Truss; Steel	AH1; Railway bridge Yalu River	1943	Dandong–Sinuiju; 40°06′54.1″N 124°23′33.2″E	Liaoning; Democratic People's Republic of Korea	
25	Wuhan Yangtze River Bridge	武汉长江大桥	First bridge over the Yangtze	1,670 m (5,480 ft)	Truss; Steel, 2 levels	National Highway 107; Wuhan Inner Ring Road; Beijing–Guangzhou railway Yangtze	1957	Wuhan; 30°33′08.1″N 114°16′58.9″E	Hubei	
26	Nanjing Yangtze River Bridge	南京长江大桥		6,772 m (22,218 ft)	Truss; Steel, 2 levels	National Highway 104, 205, 312; Beijing–Shanghai; Nanjing–Xi'an; Nanjing–Qidong railways Yangtze	1968	Nanjing; 32°06′55.3″N 118°44′18.8″E	Jiangsu	(Note: The Nanjing Yangtze River Bridge is a mixed road / rail bridge which has a common part over the Yangtze, the two tracks branch off on either side of the central structure. The road section measures a total of 4,588 meters, the rail section 6,772 meters and the main truss structure 1,576 meters.)
27	Buxian Bridge	黄山步仙桥	Mount Huangshan; World Heritage Site		Masonry; 1 segmental arch	Footbridge	1988	Huangshan District	Anhui	
28	Wuchaohe Bridge	乌巢河大桥	Span : 120 m (390 ft)	251 m (823 ft)	Masonry; 1 main segmental arch, 13 secondary arches	Wuchaohe	1990	Fenghuang County; 28°04′43.0″N 109°23′58.0″E	Hunan	
29	Danhe Bridge	丹河大桥	Longest masonry span in the world Span : 146 m (479 ft)	413 m (1,355 ft)	Masonry; 1 main segmental arch, 7 secondary arches	G5512 Jincheng–Xinxiang Expressway; Dan River	2000	Jincheng; 35°28′15.2″N 112°59′42.8″E	Shanxi	

== Major road and railway bridges ==
This table presents the structures with spans greater than 1000 meters (non-exhaustive list).

	Name	Chinese	Span	Length	Type	Carries Crosses	Opened	Location	Province	Ref.
1	Zhangjinggao Yangtze River South Bridge under construction	张靖皋长江大桥 (南航道桥)	2,300 m (7,500 ft)	12,007 m (39,393 ft)	Suspension; Steel box girder deck, concrete pylons 2300+717	Yangtze	2028	Zhangjiagang–Rugao; 32°01′20.5″N 120°31′21.8″E	Jiangsu	
2	Yanji Yangtze River Bridge under construction	燕矶长江大桥	1,860 m (6,100 ft)		Suspension; 2 levels steel truss deck, 4 main suspension cables, concrete pylons	Yangtze	2025	Huanggang–Ezhou; 30°24′24.8″N 114°59′18.9″E	Hubei	
3	Shuangyumen Bridge under construction	双屿门特大桥	1,768 m (5,801 ft)		Suspension; Steel box girder deck, concrete pylons	Fodu Channel; Hangzhou Bay	2027	Ningbo–Putuo District; 29°43′33.3″N 122°02′15.8″E	Zhejiang	
4	Nanjing Xianxin Yangtze River Bridge	仙新路长江大桥	1,760 m (5,770 ft)		Suspension; Steel box girder deck, concrete pylons	Yangtze	2024	Nanjing; 32°10′52.4″N 118°53′40.0″E	Jiangsu	
5	Yangsigang Yangtze River Bridge	杨泗港长江大桥	1,700 m (5,600 ft)		Suspension; 2 levels steel truss deck, concrete pylons	Yangsigang Expressway; Yangtze	2019	Wuhan; 30°30′36.2″N 114°15′23.2″E	Hubei	
6	Nansha East Bridge	南沙大桥	1,688 m (5,538 ft)		Suspension; Steel box girder deck, concrete pylons	S6 Guanfan Expressway; Pearl River	2019	Guangzhou–Dongguan; 22°53′05.6″N 113°33′56.4″E	Guangdong	
7	Shenzhen–Zhongshan Link	深中大桥	1,666 m (5,466 ft)	17,000 m (56,000 ft)	Suspension; Steel box girder deck, concrete pylons 580+1666+580	G2518 Shenzhen–Cenxi Expressway; Pearl River	2024	Shenzhen–Zhongshan; 22°33′21.3″N 113°43′36.2″E	Guangdong	
8	Xihoumen Bridge	西堠门大桥	1,650 m (5,410 ft)	5,452 m (17,887 ft)	Suspension; Double steel box girder deck, concrete pylons 1650+578	G9211 Ningbo–Zhoushan Expressway; Xihoumen Channel; Hangzhou Bay	2009	Jintang Island–Cezi Island; 30°03′42.7″N 121°54′57.3″E	Zhejiang	
9	Woluo River Bridge under construction	卧罗河特大桥	1,620 m (5,310 ft)		Suspension; Steel truss deck, concrete pylons	G7611 Xichang–Shangri-La Expressway; Woluo River	2027	Yanyuan County; 27°40′25.6″N 101°07′52.0″E	Sichuan	
10	Xiaowan Lancang River Bridge under construction	小湾澜沧江特大桥	1,575 m (5,167 ft)		Suspension	Weishan–Fengqing Expressway; Lancang River		Weishan County–Fengqing County	Yunnan	
11	Longtan Yangtze River Bridge under construction	龙潭长江大桥	1,560 m (5,120 ft)	4,963 m (16,283 ft)	Suspension; Steel box girder deck, concrete pylons	Nanjing Metropolitan Ring Expressway; Yangtze	2024	Nanjing–Yangzhou; 32°14′37.2″N 119°05′09.0″E	Jiangsu	
12	Jinsha River Bridge Dandong under construction	大东金沙江特大桥	1,520 m (4,990 ft)	2,054 m (6,739 ft)	Suspension; Steel truss deck, concrete pylons	Jinsha River	2026	Gucheng District–Ninglang County; 27°05′30.2″N 100°28′46.3″E	Yunnan	
13	Runyang Yangtze River Bridge	润扬长江大桥	1,490 m (4,890 ft)	7,210 m (23,650 ft)	Suspension; Steel box girder deck, concrete pylons	G4011 Yangzhou–Liyang Expressway; Yangtze	2005	Yangzhou–Zhenjiang; 32°12′24.6″N 119°21′49.9″E	Jiangsu	
14	Xihoumen Railroad Bridge under construction	西堠门公铁两用大桥	1,488 m (4,882 ft)		Suspension with cable-stays Triple steel box girder deck, concrete pylons 112+406+1488+406+112	Road bridge Ningbo–Zhoushan high-speed railway Xihoumen Channel; Hangzhou Bay	2026	Jintang Island–Cezi Island; 30°04′56.6″N 121°54′01.1″E	Zhejiang	
15	Dongting Lake Bridge Hangrui	洞庭湖大桥 (杭瑞高速)	1,480 m (4,860 ft)		Suspension; Steel box girder deck, concrete pylons	G56 Hangzhou–Ruili Expressway; Dongting Lake	2018	Yueyang; 29°25′23.8″N 113°07′30.3″E	Hunan	
16	Shuangliu Yangtze River Bridge under construction	双柳长江大桥	1,430 m (4,690 ft)		Suspension; Steel box girder deck, concrete pylons	G9906 Wuhan Metropolitan Area Ring Expressway; Yangtze	2026	Wuhan–Ezhou; 30°36′34.3″N 114°45′03.1″E	Hubei	
17	Huajiang Canyon Bridge	花江峡谷大桥	1,420 m (4,660 ft)		Suspension; Steel truss deck, concrete pylons	Beipan River	2025	Guanling County–Zhenfeng County; 25°42′18.3″N 105°35′12.6″E	Guizhou	
18	Nanjing Qixiashan Yangtze River Bridge	南京栖霞山长江大桥	1,418 m (4,652 ft)	5,437 m (17,838 ft)	Suspension; Steel box girder deck, concrete pylons 409+1418+364	G25 Changchun–Shenzhen Expressway; Yangtze	2012	Nanjing; 32°10′39.9″N 118°56′23.3″E	Jiangsu	
19	Yongchang Lancang River Bridge	永昌澜沧江大桥	1,416 m (4,646 ft)	1,912 m (6,273 ft)	Suspension; Steel truss deck, concrete pylons 60+1416+60	Yongchang Expressway; Lancang River	2025	Changning County; 24°53′35.6″N 99°44′37.9″E	Yunnan	
20	Jin'an Jinsha River Bridge	金安金沙江特大桥	1,386 m (4,547 ft)	1,681 m (5,515 ft)	Suspension; Steel truss deck, concrete pylons 41+1386+41	G4216 Chengdu–Lijiang Expressway; Jinsha River	2020	Lijiang; 26°49′15.6″N 100°26′34.7″E	Yunnan	
21	Jiangyin Yangtze River Bridge	江阴长江大桥	1,385 m (4,544 ft)	3,071 m (10,075 ft)	Suspension; Steel box girder deck, concrete pylons	G2 Beijing–Shanghai Expressway; Yangtze	1999	Jiangyin–Jingjiang; 31°56′43.1″N 120°16′10.0″E	Jiangsu	
22	Tsing Ma Bridge	青馬大橋	1,377 m (4,518 ft)	3,523 m (11,558 ft)	Suspension; 2 levels steel box girder deck, concrete pylons 1377+355	Route 8 (Hong Kong); MTR; Tung Chung line Airport Express; Ma Wan Channel	1997	Tsing Yi–Ma Wan; 22°21′04.8″N 114°04′25.6″E	Hong Kong	
23	Yangluo Yangtze River Bridge	武汉阳逻长江大桥	1,280 m (4,200 ft)	2,725 m (8,940 ft)	Suspension; Steel box girder deck, concrete pylons 70+1280+55	G70 Fuzhou–Yinchuan Expressway; G4201 Wuhan Ring Expressway; Yangtze	2007	Wuhan; 30°38′12.9″N 114°33′17.8″E	Hubei	
24	Dahe Bridge under construction	六盘水大河特大桥	1,250 m (4,100 ft)	2,201 m (7,221 ft)	Suspension; Steel truss deck, concrete pylons 353+1250+307	Dahe River	2026	Liupanshui; 26°39′51.8″N 104°50′09.3″E	Guizhou	
25	Fuxing Yangtze River Bridge	复兴长江大桥	1,208 m (3,963 ft)		Suspension; Steel box girder deck, concrete pylons	Yangtze	2025	Yunyang County; 30°55′30.9″N 108°46′23.5″E	Chongqing	
26	Zhangjinggao Yangtze River North Bridge under construction	张靖皋长江大桥 (北航道桥 )	1,208 m (3,963 ft)	12,007 m (39,393 ft)	Suspension; Steel box girder deck, concrete pylons	Yangtze	2028	Zhangjiagang–Rugao; 32°01′20.5″N 120°31′21.8″E	Jiangsu	
27	Nansha West Bridge	南沙大桥	1,200 m (3,900 ft)		Suspension; Steel box girder deck, concrete pylons	S6 Guanfan Expressway; Pearl River	2019	Guangzhou–Dongguan; 22°52′59.7″N 113°31′08.8″E	Guangdong	
28	Chajiaotan Bridge	习古高速赤水河大桥	1,200 m (3,900 ft)	2,009 m (6,591 ft)	Suspension; Steel truss deck, concrete pylons	S10 Jiangxigu Expressway; S80 Guyi Expressway; Chishui River	2019	Xishui County–Gulin County; 28°09′57.3″N 106°08′07.2″E	Guizhou; Sichuan	
29	Yalong River Bridge under construction	雅砻江特大桥	1,200 m (3,900 ft)		Suspension; Steel truss deck, concrete pylons	G7611 Xichang–Shangri-La Expressway; Yalong River	2027	Yanyuan County; 27°42′24.6″N 102°00′18.5″E	Sichuan	
30	Longjiang Bridge	龙江特大桥	1,196 m (3,924 ft)		Suspension; Steel box girder deck, concrete pylons	S10 Baoshan–Tengchong Expressway; Shweli River	2016	Wuhe Township; 24°50′19.7″N 98°40′19.9″E	Yunnan	
31	Wudongde Jinsha River Bridge under construction	乌东德金沙江大桥	1,180 m (3,870 ft)		Suspension; Steel truss deck, concrete pylons	G7611 Duxiang Expressway; Jinsha River	2026	Xichang–Zhaotong	Sichuan; Yunnan	
32	Aizhai Bridge	矮寨大桥	1,176 m (3,858 ft)	986 m (3,235 ft)	Suspension; Steel truss deck, concrete pylons	G65 Baotou–Maoming Expressway; Dehang Grand Canyon	2012	Jishou; 28°19′54.1″N 109°35′53.2″E	Hunan	
33	Changtai Yangtze River Bridge	常泰长江大桥	1,176 m (3,858 ft)		Cable-stayed; 2 levels steel truss deck, concrete pylons 142+490+1176+490+142	Road bridge Railway bridge Yangtze	2026	Changzhou–Taizhou; 32°00′30.1″N 119°58′23.3″E	Jiangsu	
34	Wujiagang Yangtze River Bridge	伍家岗长江大桥	1,160 m (3,810 ft)	1,852 m (6,076 ft)	Suspension; Steel box girder deck, concrete pylons	Road bridge Yangtze	2021	Yichang; 30°37′04.3″N 111°21′39.4″E	Hubei	(Note: The length given only takes into account the main bridge, central span(s) and shore span(s), approach viaducts are not counted.)
35	Guanyinsi Yangtze River Bridge under construction	观音寺长江大桥	1,160 m (3,810 ft)		Cable-stayed; Steel box girder deck, concrete pylons 80+1160+96	Yangtze	2026	Jingzhou–Jiangling County; 30°06′15.5″N 112°12′14.7″E	Hubei	
36	Qingshui River Bridge	清水河特大桥	1,130 m (3,710 ft)	2,171 m (7,123 ft)	Suspension; Steel truss deck, concrete pylons 42+1130+40	G69 Yinchuan–Baise Expressway; Qingshui River	2016	Kaiyang County–Weng'an County; 27°01′47.9″N 107°11′26.5″E	Guizhou	
37	Ma'anshan Yangtze River Railroad Bridge under construction	马鞍山公铁两用长江大桥	1,120 m (3,670 ft)(x2)		Cable-stayed; 2 levels steel truss deck, 3 concrete pylons 112+392+2x1120+1120 +392+112	Road bridge Railway bridge Yangtze	2025	Ma'anshan; 31°35′36.4″N 118°23′25.8″E	Anhui	
38	Libu Yangtze River Railroad Bridge under construction	李埠长江公铁大桥	1,120 m (3,670 ft)		Suspension with cable-stays 2 levels steel truss deck, concrete pylons	Yangtze	2026	Jingzhou; 30°17′12.8″N 112°04′27.0″E	Hubei	
39	Huangpu Bridge	黄埔大桥	1,108 m (3,635 ft)	7,016 m (23,018 ft)	Suspension; Steel box girder deck, concrete pylons	G0425 Guangzhou–Macau Expressway; Pearl River	2008	Guangzhou; 23°04′17.9″N 113°28′33.7″E	Guangdong	
40	Xingkang Bridge	泸定大渡河特大桥	1,100 m (3,600 ft)	1,411 m (4,629 ft)	Suspension; Steel truss deck, concrete pylons 34+1100+34	G4218 Ya'an–Kargilik Expressway; Dadu River	2018	Luding County; 29°57′56.3″N 102°12′53.8″E	Sichuan	
41	Kaizhouhu Bridge	开州湖大桥	1,100 m (3,600 ft)		Suspension; Steel truss deck, concrete pylons	Kaiyang–Weng'an Expressway; Qingshui River	2021	Miping County; 27°11′57.6″N 107°05′13.4″E	Guizhou; Sichuan	
42	Longmen Bridge (Qinzhou) under construction	龙门大桥	1,098 m (3,602 ft)	6,597 m (21,644 ft)	Suspension; Steel box girder deck, concrete pylons	Maowei Sea	2024	Qinzhou–Fangchenggang; 21°45′12.8″N 108°33′17.3″E	Guangxi	
43	Husutong Yangtze River Bridge	沪苏通长江公铁大桥	1,092 m (3,583 ft)		Cable-stayed; 2 levels steel truss deck, concrete pylons 142+462+1092+462+142	S19 Nantong-Wuxi Expressway; Shanghai–Suzhou–Nantong railway Yangtze	2020	Suzhou–Nantong; 32°00′15.3″N 120°42′49.9″E	Jiangsu	
44	Wufengshan Yangtze River Bridge	五峰山长江大桥	1,092 m (3,583 ft)		Suspension; 2 levels steel truss deck, concrete pylons 84+1092+84	S68 Expressway; Lianyungang–Zhenjiang HSR; Yangtze	2020	Yangzhou–Zhenjiang; 32°13′37.0″N 119°40′30.1″E	Jiangsu	
45	Sutong Yangtze River Bridge	苏通长江大桥	1,088 m (3,570 ft)	8,146 m (26,726 ft)	Cable-stayed; Steel box girder deck, concrete pylons 2x100+300+1088+300 +2x100	G15 Shenyang–Haikou Expressway; Yangtze	2008	Suzhou–Nantong; 31°46′40.1″N 120°59′41.9″E	Jiangsu	
46	Baling River Bridge	坝陵河大桥	1,088 m (3,570 ft)	2,237 m (7,339 ft)	Suspension; Steel truss deck, concrete pylons	G60 Shanghai–Kunming Expressway; Baling River	2009	Guanling County; 25°57′40.0″N 105°37′46.0″E	Guizhou	
47	Taizhou Yangtze River Bridge	泰州长江大桥	1,080 m (3,540 ft)(x2)	9,726 m (31,909 ft)	Suspension; Steel box girder deck, 3 pylons (steel in the middle, concrete on each side); 70+1080+1080+70	S35 Taizhou–Zhenjiang Expressway; Yangtze	2012	Taizhou–Yangzhong; 32°14′47.8″N 119°52′36.1″E	Jiangsu	
48	Ma'anshan Yangtze River Bridge	马鞍山长江大桥	1,080 m (3,540 ft)(x2)	11,000 m (36,000 ft)	Suspension; Steel box girder deck, 3 pylons (steel in the middle, concrete on each side); 1080+1080	S24 Hefei-Chaohu-Maanshan Expressway; Yangtze	2013	Ma'anshan; 31°36′50.0″N 118°23′34.7″E	Anhui	
49	Zangkejiang Bridge	牂牁江特大桥	1,080 m (3,540 ft)	1,849 m (6,066 ft)	Suspension; Steel truss deck, concrete pylons	Naqing Expressway; Beipan River	2025	Shuicheng District; 26°09′59.3″N 105°06′51.5″E	Guizhou; Sichuan	
50	Nujiang Railway Bridge Chuanzang under construction	藏铁路怒江大桥	1,064 m (3,491 ft)	1,300 m (4,300 ft)	Suspension; Steel truss deck, concrete pylons	Sichuan–Tibet railway Nu River	2030	Pasho County; 30°06′44.4″N 97°11′16.1″E	Tibet	
51	Jinsha River Bridge Ningnan under construction	宁南金沙江特大桥	1,060 m (3,480 ft)		Suspension; Steel truss deck, concrete pylons	Jinsha River	2024	Ningnan County–Qiaojia County; 26°58′43.9″N 102°53′39.0″E	Sichuan; Yunnan	
52	Daduhe Railway Bridge Chuanzang under construction	川藏铁路大渡河特大桥	1,060 m (3,480 ft)	1,293 m (4,242 ft)	Suspension; Steel truss deck, concrete pylons	Sichuan–Tibet railway Dadu River	2028	Luding County; 29°55′50.6″N 102°13′45.5″E	Sichuan	
53	Fuma Yangtze River Bridge	驸马长江大桥	1,050 m (3,440 ft)	2,030 m (6,660 ft)	Suspension; Steel box girder deck, concrete pylons 77+1050+77	G69 Yinchuan–Baise Expressway; Yangtze	2017	Wanzhou District; 30°50′04.5″N 108°28′06.6″E	Chongqing	
54	Qipanzhou Yangtze River Bridge	棋盘洲长江公路大桥	1,038 m (3,406 ft)	3,328 m (10,919 ft)	Suspension; Steel box girder deck, concrete pylons	S78 Qijia Expressway; Yangtze	2021	Qichun County–Yangxin County; 30°09′08.5″N 115°16′03.4″E	Hubei	
55	Jinsha River Bridge Kahaluo under construction	卡哈洛金沙江特大桥	1,030 m (3,380 ft)	1,818 m (5,965 ft)	Suspension; Steel truss deck, concrete pylons	Jinsha River	2024	Leibo County–Yongshan County; 27°58′13.1″N 103°30′42.7″E	Yunnan	
56	Xintian Yangtze River Bridge	新田长江大桥	1,020 m (3,350 ft)	1,770 m (5,810 ft)	Suspension; Steel box girder deck, concrete pylons	Wanzhou Ring Expressway; Yangtze	2022	Wanzhou District; 30°38′42.4″N 108°20′54.3″E	Chongqing	
57	Stonecutters Bridge	昂船洲大橋	1,018 m (3,340 ft)		Cable-stayed; Double steel box girder deck, composite steel/concrete pylons 80+1018+80	Route 8 (Hong Kong); Rambler Channel	2009	Tsing Yi–Stonecutters Island; 22°19′33.7″N 114°07′06.0″E	Hong Kong	
58	Yidu Yangtze River Bridge	宜都长江大桥	1,000 m (3,300 ft)		Suspension; Steel truss deck, concrete pylons	G59 Hohhot–Beihai Expressway; Yangtze	2021	Yidu–Zhijiang; 30°24′35.0″N 111°30′59.1″E	Hubei	

== List of bridges by province ==
Dedicated lists already exist for the following provinces : Chongqing, Fujian, Guangdong, Guizhou, Hubei, Jiangsu, Sichuan, Zhejiang, Hong Kong and Taiwan.

Anhui

- Anqing Bridge
- Anqing Railway Bridge
- Ma'anshan Yangtze River Bridge
- Taipinghu Bridge
- Tongling Bridge
- Wuhu Yangtze River Bridge

Beijing

- Baliqiao
- Beijing Grand Bridge
- Gaoliang Bridge
- Jade Belt Bridge
- Marco Polo Bridge
- Sanyuan Bridge
- Shifeng Bridge

Gansu

- Zhongshan Bridge

Guangxi

- Chengyang Bridge
- Hongguang Bridge
- Ling-Tie Bridge
- Liujing Yujiang Bridge
- Sanan Yongjiang Bridge
- Wenhui Bridge
- Yonghe Bridge (Nanning)
- Yongjiang Bridge
- Yongjiang Railway Bridge under construction

Hainan

- Dinghai Bridge, an arch bridge of the Nandu River built in 2017
- Haikou Century Bridge, a cable-stayed bridge in Haikou city, crossing the mouth of the Haidian River, it links the main part of Haikou city to Haidian Island
- Haikou New East Bridge, an arch bridge over the Nandu River connecting Xinbu Island at the west to Dongying Town and the rest of the province at the east
- Nandu River Iron Bridge, a partially collapsed, steel truss bridge over the Nandu River
- Qinglan Bridge is a cable-stayed bridge in Wenchang. It is considered the most earthquake-resistant bridge in China being able to handle one at a magnitude of 8.5 on the Richter scale.
- Puqian Bridge, a bridge in the northeast part of Hainan, over the entrance to Dongzhai Harbor
- Qiongzhou Bridge, crossing the Nandu River, it serves as the main bridge from Haikou city to Haikou Meilan International Airport

Hebei

- Anji Bridge

Heilongjiang

- Yangmingtan Bridge

Henan

- Xuguo Bridge

Hunan

- Aizhai Bridge
- Akaishi Bridge under construction
- Dongting Lake Bridge
- Fuyuan Road Bridge
- Lianxiang Bridge
- Lishui River Bridge
- Jingyue Bridge
- Maocaojie Bridge
- Sanchaji Bridge
- Wangchui Bridge
- Wangcun Bridge
- Zhangjiajie Glass Bridge
- Lucky Knot Bridge

Inner Mongolia

- Baotou Yellow River Bridge

Jiangxi

- Dongjin Bridge
- Jiujiang Bridge
- Jiujiang Fuyin Expressway Bridge
- Poyang Lake Bridge
- Shengmi Bridge

Jilin

- Changbai–Hyesan International Bridge
- Ji'an Yalu River Border Railway Bridge
- Lanqi Bridge
- Linjiang Yalu River Bridge
- Tumen Border Bridge
- Tumen River Bridge

Liaoning

- Fumin Bridge
- Liaohe Bridge
- Moon Island Bridge
- New Yalu River Bridge
- Sino–Korean Friendship Bridge

Ningxia

- Taole Yellow River Expressway Bridge

Qinghai

- Tuotuo River Bridge

Shaanxi

- Luohe River Bridge
- Weinan Weihe Grand Bridge

Shandong

- Binzhou Yellow River Bridge
- Luokou Yellow River Railway Bridge
- Jiaozhou Bay Bridge
- Jinan Third Bridge
- Jinan Yellow River Bridge
- Weiliu Bridge

Shanghai

- Chonghai Bridge
- Chongqi Bridge
- Donghai Bridge
- Lupu Bridge
- Minpu Bridge
- Nanpu Bridge
- Shanghai Yangtze River Bridge
- Waibaidu Bridge
- Xupu Bridge
- Yangpu Bridge

Shanxi

- Xianshen River Bridge

Tianjin

- Dagu Bridge
- Tianjin Eye
- Yonghe Bridge (Tianjin)

Tibet

- Chushul Chakzam
- Dazi Bridge
- Jiaolongba Bridge
- Sino-Nepal Friendship Bridge
- Tongmai Bridge

Xinjiang

- Guozigoui Bridge

Yunnan

- Duge Bridge
- Honghe Bridge
- Lancang River Railway Bridge
- Liupanshui Bridge
- Longjiang Bridge
- Nanpanjiang Bridge
- Puli Bridge
- Qiubei Nanpanjiang River Bridge under construction
- Jin'an Bridge

Macau

- Ponte de Amizade

== Notes and references ==
- Notes
- Nicolas Janberg. "International Database for Civil and Structural Engineering". Structurae.com.
- Others references

== See also ==
- Architecture of the Song dynasty
- Bridges and tunnels across the Yangtze River
- Transport in China
- China National Highways
- Expressways of China
- Rail transport in China
- Geography of China
- zh:天津海河桥梁列表 (in Chinese) - List of bridges over the Haihe in Tianjin
