= Liaohe Bridge =

Liaohe Bridge 辽河大桥
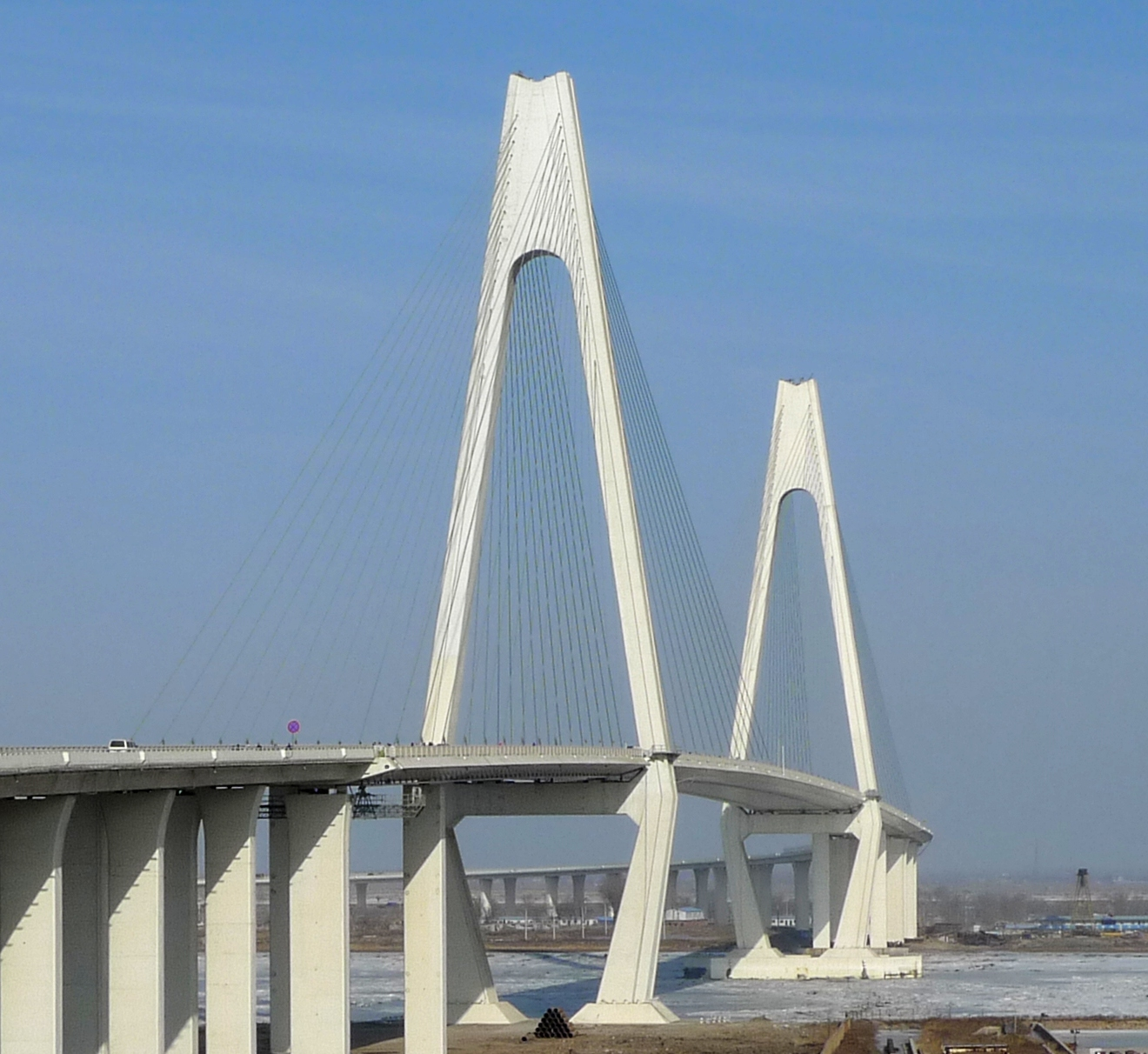
- Coordinates: 40°41′38.4″N 122°10′55.3″E
- Crosses: East Liao River
- Locale: Yingkou, Liaoning

Characteristics
- Design: cable-stayed
- Total length: 3,326 metres (10,912 ft)
- Longest span: 436 metres (1,430 ft)

History
- Opened: 2010

Location
- Interactive map of Liaohe Bridge

The Liaohe Bridge is a bridge in over the Eastern Liao River in Yingkou, Liaoning, China. The bridge is a five-span cable-stayed structure 866 meters in length.

== See also ==
- List of longest cable-stayed bridge spans
