= Taihu Bridge =

Bridge in Suzhou, Jiangsu, China

Coordinates: 31.204°N 120.3638°E

Taihu Bridge (simplified Chinese: 太湖大桥; traditional Chinese: 太湖大橋) is a bridge located in Suzhou, Jiangsu, linking Xukou and Xishan Island in the Lake Tai, with a total length of 4,308 meters. The construction began on October 27, 1992 and finished on October 25, 1994. The total cost of this bridge is over 100 million yuan at that time, raised by Wu County. Due to rapid development of tourism, the bridge has been increasingly overcrowded. The municipal government of Suzhou has decided to build a new bridge parallel to this one.

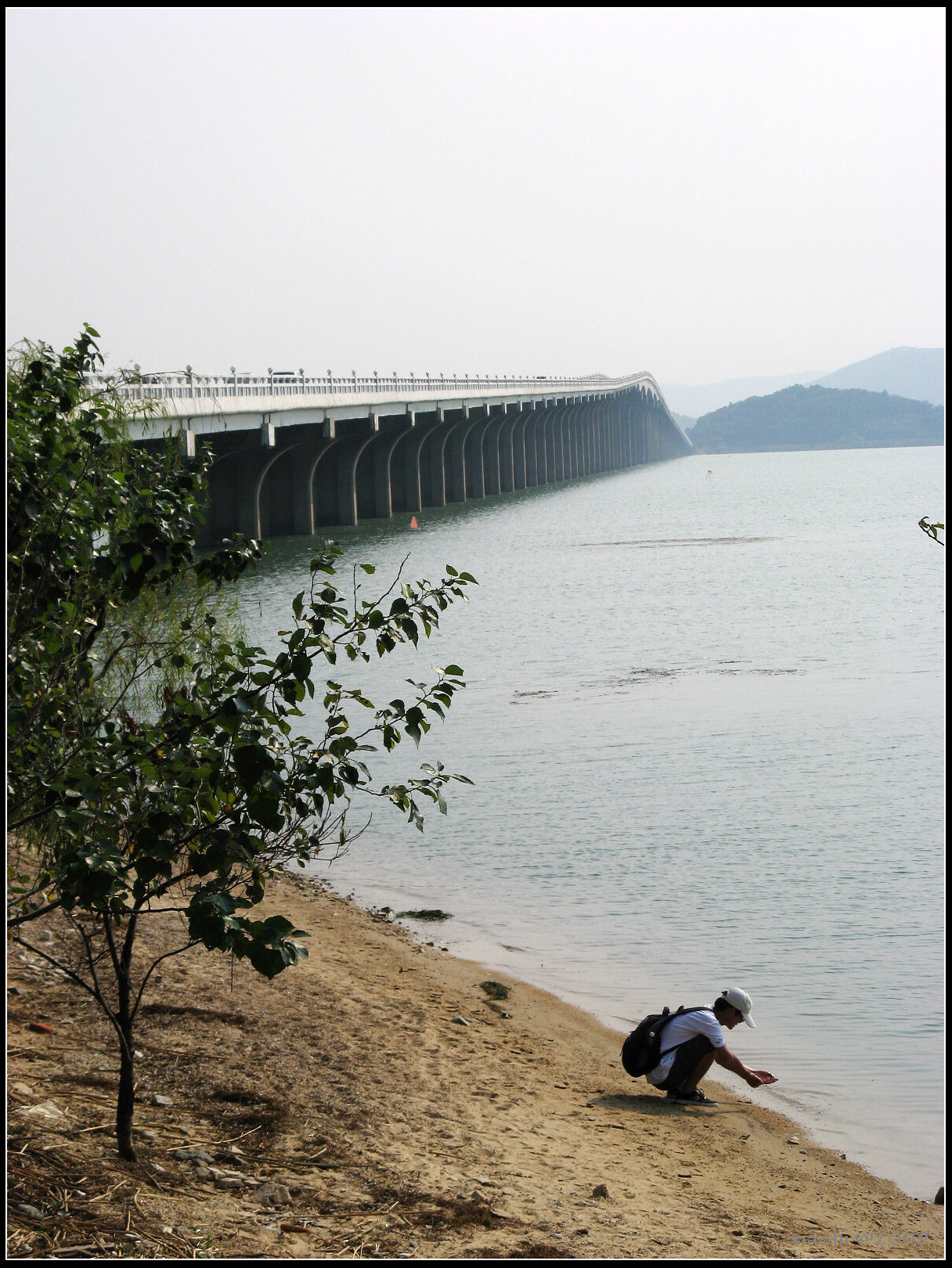
Overview

Road
