= Taizhou Yangtze River Bridge =

Taizhou Bridge 泰州长江大桥
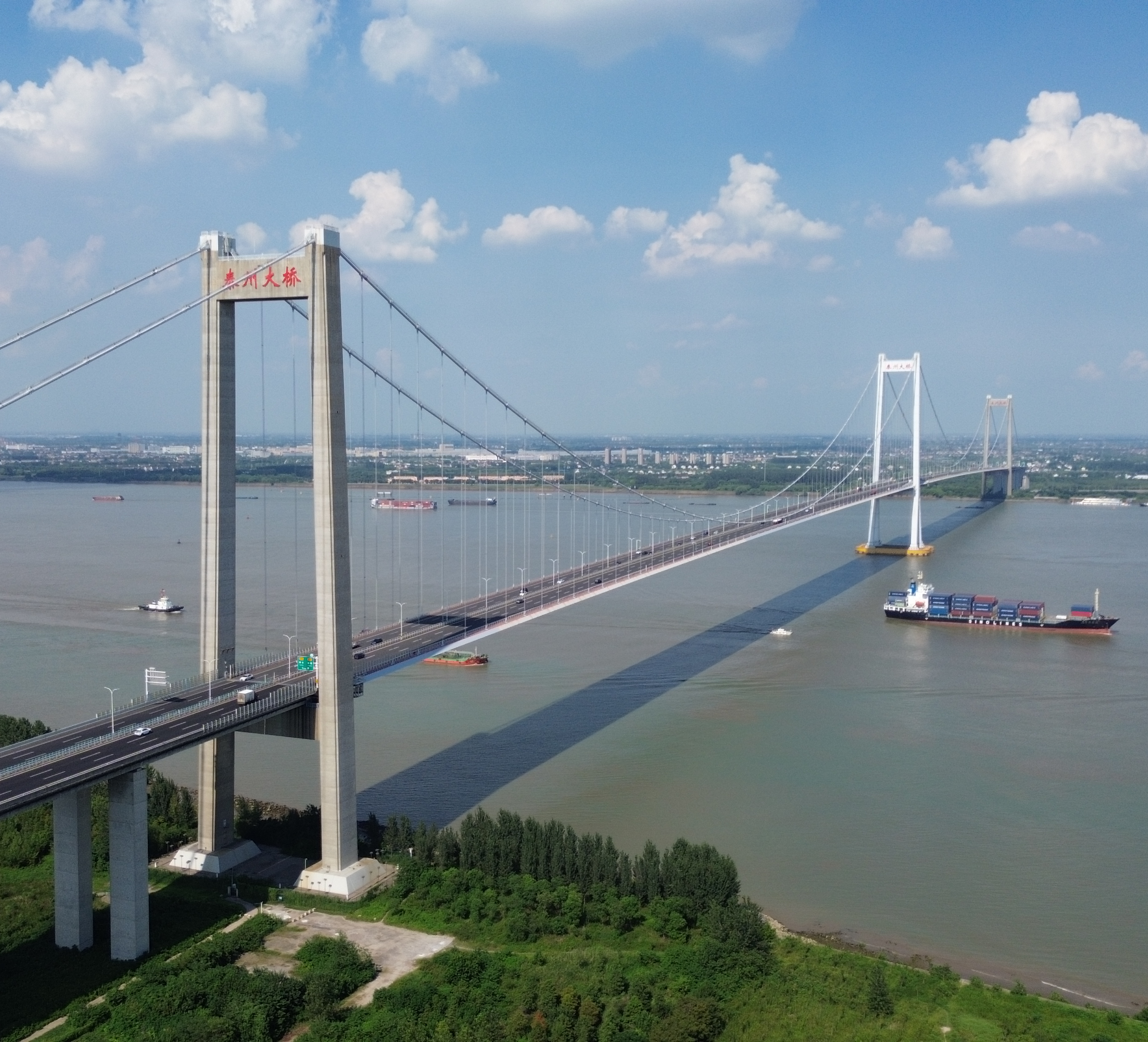
- Coordinates: 32.246611°N 119.876694°E
- Crosses: Yangtze
- Locale: Taizhou, Jiangsu

Characteristics
- Design: north bridge: suspension bridge south bridge: box-girder bridge
- Total length: north bridge: 6,821 m (22,379 ft) south bridge: 2,905 m (9,531 ft) north bridge span length: 2,160 m (7,090 ft) south bridge span length: 965 m (3,166 ft)
- Width: 34.8 m (114 ft)
- Height: 192 m (630 ft)
- Longest span: north bridge: 1,080 m (3,540 ft) x2 south bridge: 125 m (410 ft)x5
- No. of spans: north bridge: 2 main south bridge: 5 main

History
- Opened: November 25, 2012

Location
- Interactive map of Taizhou Bridge

The Taizhou Yangtze River Bridge is a bridge complex over the Lower Yangtze River in Jiangsu Province in eastern China. The bridge connects Taizhou on the north bank, Yangzhong on an island in the river, and Yaoqiao Village of Zhenjiang Municipality on the south bank, and consists of a suspension bridge across the north branch stream and a pair of box-girder bridges across the south branch stream. Taizhou Bridge Complex opened in 2012.

== History ==
The concept of a passage over the Yangtze was developed in 1998. It was not until December 2007 when the construction of the bridge began. It would become the first 1,000-meter-span and 3-tower-continuous-span suspension bridge. The idea of multiple towers and the pylon suspension lines to connect them was to decrease the impact that river flow can have on the structure. Being the first of its kind, the bridge would influence and shape various studies on structural engineering. This would lead to resolutions to known issues and research proposals in the engineering field. For example, a reasonable method of a wind resistance test was developed based on the unique structural integrity of the bridge. As a result, the Ministry of Communication of China recognize the bridge as a symbol of innovation in bridge technology.

The bridge has provided many functional contributions as well. With the daily traffic flow being at 30,000 on the bridge, the commute between Taizhou, Jiangsui and Changzhou has been reduced from 2 hours to 1. The structural achievement is seen as a promoter for the areas as it connects east to west. This progress is predicted to help accelerate development of the surrounding cities, especially Taizhou.

== Bridge components ==
Altogether the Taizhou Bridge construction project was 62.088 km (38.580 mi) long. The north bridge is 6,821 m (22,379 ft), including a three-tower suspension bridge with a pair of 1,080 m (3,540 ft) suspension spans, and 4,661 m (15,292 ft) of connecting approaches. The south bridge is 2,905 m (9,531 ft) with box-girder spans of 85+125x3+85 = 545 m (1,788 ft) and 85+125x2+85=420 m (1,380 ft). The north bank has 8 km (5.0 mi) of connecting highway. Yangzhong Island has 2.94 km (1.83 mi) of highway and the south bank has 40 km (25 mi) of connecting highway.

The north bridge's double suspension spans are among the longest in the world.

The structural integrity of the bridge is dependent on the main lines. However, these main lines are constantly exposed to harsh weathers which can affect its strength and longevity through erosion. To address this issue, The Jiangsu Province Communications Planning and Design Institute Limited Company established a "dehumidification system". This system involves humidity and temperature sensors so maintenance groups can have "real-time visibility of the condition of critical areas and can conduct analysis based on historical data to ensure science-based decision-making in the maintenance of the bridge’s main cables".

== Awards ==
- 2013 Institution of Structural Engineers Supreme Award for structural engineering
- 2014 IABSE Outstanding Structure Award.
- American Society of Civil Engineers 2014 Outstanding Civil Engineering Achievement Award
- Front cover appearance on Bridge Design and Engineering magazine

== See also ==
- List of bridges in China
- Yangtze River bridges and tunnels
- List of longest suspension bridge spans
- List of tallest bridges in the world
