= Luding Bridge =

Bridge in Luding County, Sichuan, China

Luding Bridge 泸定桥
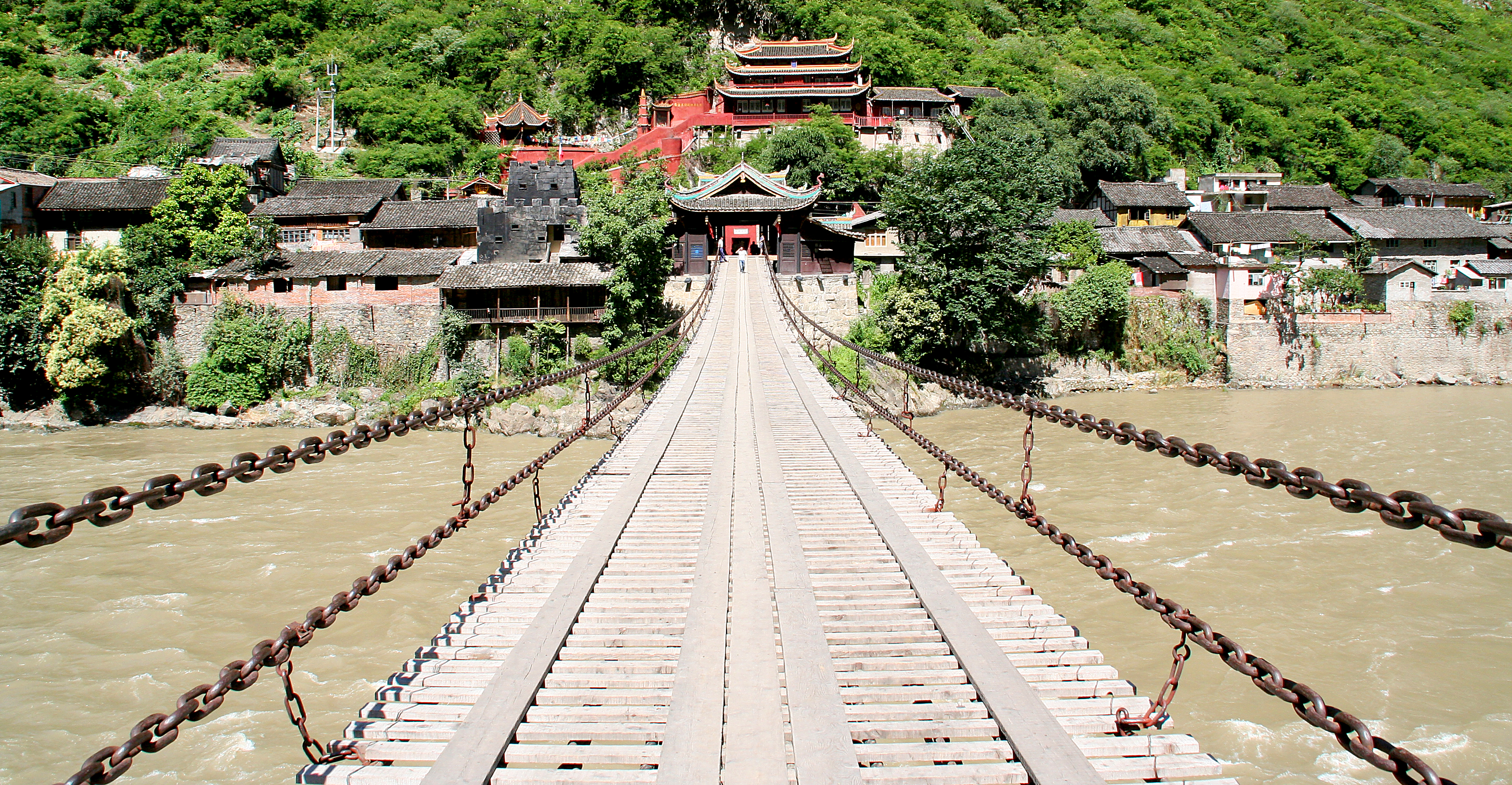
- Coordinates: 29.9145°N 102.2299°E
- Carries: Footbridge
- Crosses: Dadu River
- Locale: Luding County, Sichuan, China

Characteristics
- Design: Suspension bridge
- Material: Chain
- Longest span: 100 metres (330 ft)

History
- Opened: 1701

Location
- Interactive map of Luding Bridge

Luding Bridge (simplified Chinese: 泸定桥; traditional Chinese: 瀘定橋; pinyin: Lúdìng Qiáo) is a bridge over the Dadu River in Luding County, Garzê Tibetan Autonomous Prefecture, Sichuan, China, located about 80 kilometers west of the city of Ya'an. The bridge dates from the Qing Dynasty and is considered a historical landmark. It was an important crossing on the road between Sichuan and Tibet. The bridge was the location of the Battle of Luding Bridge, one of the most important events in the Long March.

== Battle of Luding Bridge ==
In 1935, during the Long March, soldiers of the Fourth Regiment of the Chinese Workers and Peasants' Army secured the bridge as a river crossing vital to the Red Army.

== See also ==
- Luding Yaye Expressway Bridge
- List of bridges in China
