= Jiangyin Yangtze River Bridge =

Jiangyin Bridge 江阴长江大桥
- Coordinates: 31.949204°N 120.267441°E
- Carries: G2 Beijing-Shanghai Expressway
- Crosses: Yangtze River
- Locale: Jiangyin and Jingjiang, Jiangsu

Characteristics
- Design: Suspension bridge
- Total length: 3 km (2 mi)
- Height: 186 m (610 ft); 183 m (600 ft)
- Longest span: 1,385 m (4,544 ft)
- Clearance below: 50 m (164 ft)

History
- Constructed by: Cleveland Bridge & Engineering Company
- Construction start: 1994
- Construction end: 1997
- Construction cost: 2.728 billion yuan
- Opened: September 28, 1997

Location
- Interactive map of Jiangyin Bridge

The Jiangyin Yangtze River Bridge (Chinese: 江阴长江大桥) is a suspension bridge over the Yangtze River in Jiangsu, China. The bridge has a main span of 1,385 metres (4,544 ft) connects Jiangyin south of the river to Jingjiang to the north. When the bridge was completed in 1999, it was the fourth longest suspension bridge span in the world and the longest in China. Several longer bridges have since been completed in China and abroad, and it is currently the 15th longest suspension bridge in the world. The bridge was also the furthest downstream on the Yangtze until the completion of the Sutong Yangtze River Bridge in 2008 and the Chongming–Qidong Yangtze River Bridge in 2011.

== Locale ==
Located in the centre of the Jiangsu Province, the bridge carries traffic on the G2 Beijing-Shanghai Expressway. There are three lanes in both directions and pedestrian sidewalks. The location was selected due to the narrow width of the river at the bridge. The height clearance for river navigation is 50 metres (164 ft).

== History ==
The bridge was planned so that it would be completed in time to mark the 50th anniversary of the proclamation of the People's Republic of China. It was the first long-span bridge of its kind to be designed in China. Foundation work began in 1994. Engineering, manufacture and construction of the bridge was completed in just less than three years. The concrete towers are 190 metres (623 ft) tall, roughly equivalent in height to a 60 story building. The main span, constructed by Cleveland Bridge & Engineering Company, is made of flat streamlined steel box girders. The steel deck was erected by raising pre-assembled units weighing up to 500 metric tons with jacks. (pictures) The total investment of the bridge adds up to 2.728 billion yuan. The bridge opened on September 28, 1999. Jiang Zemin entitled the bridge and cut the ribbon. Goodwin Steel Castings manufactured the cable bands for the bridge.

In 2002 the bridge received an award at the International Bridge Conference for "...outstanding achievement in bridge engineering that, through vision and innovation, provides an icon to the community for which it was designed."

== See also ==
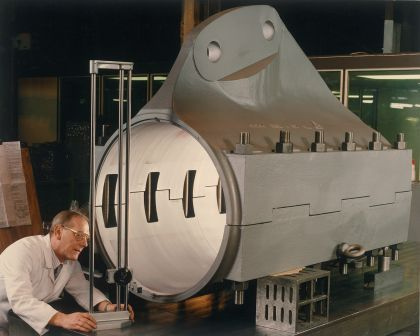
Cable band for Jiangyin Bridge undergoing dimensional inspection

- Bridges and tunnels across the Yangtze River
- List of bridges in China
- List of longest suspension bridge spans
- List of tallest bridges
