= List of longest suspension bridge spans =

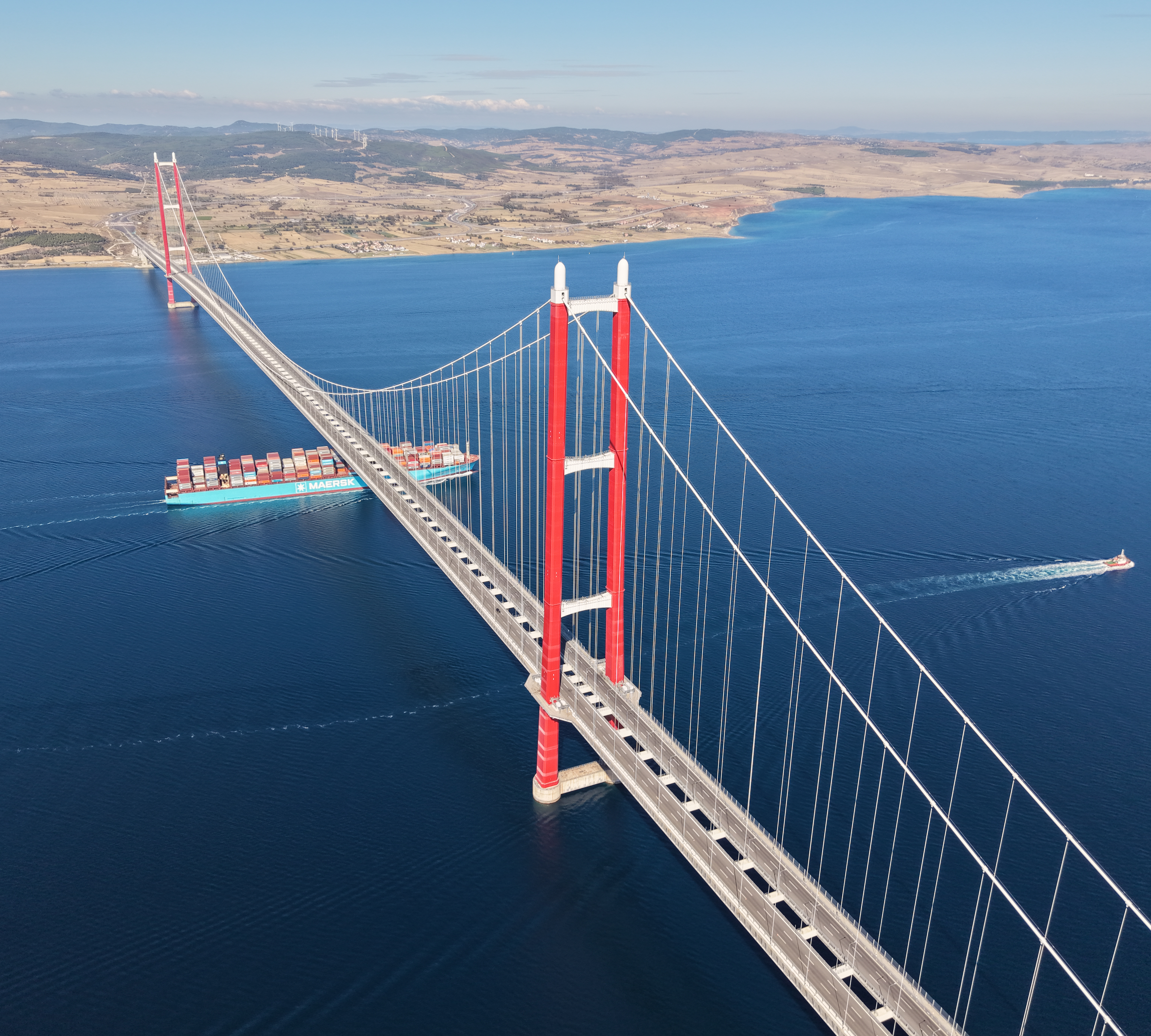
The 1915 Çanakkale Bridge in Turkey, opened in 2022, has the longest central span (2,023 m) of any suspension bridge. It crosses the Dardanelles in Turkey.

The world's longest suspension bridges are listed according to the length of their main span (i.e., the length of suspended roadway between the bridge's towers). The length of the main span is the most common method of comparing the sizes of suspension bridges, often correlating with the height of the towers and the engineering complexity involved in designing and constructing the bridge. If one bridge has a longer span than another, it does not necessarily mean that the bridge is longer from shore to shore (or from abutment to abutment).

Suspension bridges have the longest spans of any type of bridge. Cable-stayed bridges, the next longest design, are practical for spans up to just over one kilometre (the longest cable-stayed bridge in the world has a 1,176 m span). Therefore, as of October 2025, the 28 longest bridges on this list are the 28 longest spans of all types of vehicular bridges.

The 1915 Çanakkale Bridge in Turkey holds the record since opening to traffic in March 2022, with a span of 2,023 metres (6,637 ft). Since 1998, the Akashi Kaikyo Bridge in Japan previously held the record with a span of 1,991 metres (6,532 feet).

== Completed suspension bridges ==
This list includes only completed suspension bridges that carry automobiles or trains that are at least 1,000 m (3,300 ft) long. It does not include cable-stayed bridges, footbridges, or pipeline bridges.

Green	Denotes bridge that contains or previously contained the longest span in the world

Photo	Name	Main span metres (feet)	Year opened	Location	Country	Ref.
	1915 Çanakkale Bridge	2,023 m (6,637 ft)	2022	Gelibolu–Lapseki, Dardanelles; 40°20′24″N 26°38′12″E	Turkey	
	Akashi Kaikyo Bridge	1,991 m (6,532 ft)	1998	Kobe–Awaji Island, Hyōgo; 34°36′59″N 135°01′13″E	Japan	
	Nanjing Xianxin Yangtze River Bridge	1,760 m (5,774 ft)	2025	Nanjing, Jiangsu; 32°10′55″N 118°53′40″E	China	
	Yangsigang Yangtze River Bridge	1,700 m (5,577 ft)	2019	Wuhan, Hubei; 30°30′37″N 114°15′24″E	China	
	Nansha Bridge (East span)	1,688 m (5,538 ft)	2019	Nansha–Dongguan, Guangdong; 22°53′05″N 113°33′55″E	China	
	Shenzhen–Zhongshan Bridge	1,666 m (5,466 ft)	2024	Shenzhen–Zhongshan, Guangdong; 22°33′20″N 113°43′34″E	China	
	Xihoumen Bridge	1,650 m (5,413 ft)	2009	Zhoushan, Zhejiang; 30°03′42″N 121°54′55″E	China	
	Great Belt Bridge	1,624 m (5,328 ft)	1998	Korsør–Sprogø, Region Zealand; 55°20′30″N 11°02′09″E	Denmark	
	Ningyang Yangtze River Bridge	1,560 m (5,118 ft)	2025	Nanjing–Yangzhou, Jiangsu; 32°14′38″N 119°05′10″E	China	
	Osman Gazi Bridge	1,550 m (5,085 ft)	2016	Dilovası–Altınova, Gulf of İzmit; 40°45′18″N 29°30′56″E	Turkey	
	Yi Sun-sin Bridge	1,545 m (5,069 ft)	2012	Gwangyang–Yeosu, South Jeolla Province; 34°54′21″N 127°42′19″E	South Korea	
	Runyang Yangtze River Bridge	1,490 m (4,888 ft)	2005	Yangzhou–Zhenjiang, Jiangsu; 32°12′26″N 119°21′49″E	China	
	Second Dongting Lake Bridge	1,480 m (4,856 ft)	2018	Yueyang, Hunan; 29°25′25″N 113°07′29″E	China	
	Shuangliu Yangtze River Bridge	1,430 m (4,690 ft)	2026	Wuhan–Ezhou, Hubei; 30°36′34″N 114°45′04″E	China	
	Huajiang Canyon Bridge	1,420 m (4,659 ft)	2025	Guanling County–Zhenfeng County, Guizhou; 25°42′17″N 105°35′17″E	China	
	Nanjing Qixiashan Yangtze River Bridge	1,418 m (4,652 ft)	2012	Nanjing, Jiangsu; 32°10′40″N 118°56′26″E	China	
	Humber Bridge	1,410 m (4,626 ft)	1981	Hessle–Barton-upon-Humber, Yorkshire and the Humber; 53°42′25″N 0°27′00″W	United Kingdom	
	Yavuz Sultan Selim Bridge	1,408 m (4,619 ft)	2016	Istanbul, Bosphorus; 41°12′11″N 29°06′42″E	Turkey	(Note: The bridge is a cable-stayed suspension bridge, the suspension part is better at handling the load in the middle of the bridge, while the cable stayed bridge is better suited to handle the load closest to the tower.)
	Jin'an Jinsha River Bridge	1,386 m (4,547 ft)	2020	Lijiang, Yunnan; 26°49′N 100°26′E	China	
	Jiangyin Yangtze River Bridge	1,385 m (4,544 ft)	1999	Jiangyin–Jingjiang, Jiangsu; 31°56′43″N 120°16′10″E	China	
	Tsing Ma Bridge	1,377 m (4,518 ft)	1997	Tsing Yi–Ma Wan, Hong Kong; 22°21′05″N 114°04′27″E	China	
	Hardanger Bridge	1,310 m (4,298 ft)	2013	Ulvik–Eidfjord, Vestland; 60°28′45″N 6°49′47″E	Norway	
	Verrazzano–Narrows Bridge	1,298 m (4,260 ft)	1964	New York City, New York; 40°36′23″N 74°02′44″W	United States	
	Golden Gate Bridge	1,280 m (4,200 ft)	1937	San Francisco–Marin County, California; 37°49′11″N 122°28′43″W	United States	
	Yangluo Yangtze River Bridge	1,280 m (4,199 ft)	2007	Wuhan, Hubei; 30°38′11″N 114°33′18″E	China	
	Höga Kusten Bridge	1,210 m (3,970 ft)	1997	Utansjö, Västernorrland County; 62°47′52″N 17°56′19″E	Sweden	
	Fuxing Yangtze River Bridge	1,208 m (3,960 ft)	2026	Yunyang County, Chongqing; 30°55′33″N 108°46′24″E	China	
	Nansha Bridge (West span)	1,200 m (3,937 ft)	2019	Nansha–Dongguan, Guangdong; 22°52′59″N 113°31′07″E	China	
	Chajiaotan Bridge	1,200 m (3,937 ft)	2019	Xishui County, Guizhou–Gulin County, Sichuan; 28°09′57″N 106°08′07″E	China	
	Longjiang Bridge	1,196 m (3,924 ft)	2016	Baoshan, Yunnan; 24°50′19″N 98°40′19″E	China	
	Aizhai Bridge	1,176 m (3,858 ft)	2012	Jishou, Hunan; 28°19′55″N 109°35′54″E	China	
	Wujiagang Yangtze River Bridge	1,160 m (3,806 ft)	2021	Yichang, Hubei; 30°37′03″N 111°21′36″E	China	
	Mackinac Bridge	1,158 m (3,799 ft)	1957	Mackinaw City–St. Ignace, Michigan; 45°48′54″N 84°43′41″W	United States	
	Ulsan Bridge	1,150 m (3,773 ft)	2015	Ulsan; 35°30′42″N 129°23′29″E	South Korea	
	Hålogaland Bridge	1,145 m (3,757 ft)	2018	Rombaken, Narvik; 68°27′35″N 17°28′53″E	Norway	
	Qingshui River Bridge	1,130 m (3,707 ft)	2015	Kaiyang County–Weng'an County, Guizhou; 27°01′46″N 107°11′24″E	China	
	Brăila Bridge	1,120 m (3,675 ft)	2023	Brăila, Danube; 45°18′54″N 28°00′08″E	Romania	
	Huangpu Bridge	1,108 m (3,635 ft)	2008	Guangzhou, Guangdong; 23°04′18″N 113°28′32″E	China	
	Minami Bisan-Seto Bridge	1,100 m (3,609 ft)	1989	Sakaide–Shiwaku Islands, Kagawa; 34°21′52″N 133°49′31″E	Japan	
	Xingkang Bridge	1,100 m (3,609 ft)	2018	Luding County, Sichuan; 29°57′57″N 102°12′53″E	China	
	Kaizhou Lake Bridge	1,100 m (3,609 ft)	2021	Kaiyang County, Guizhou; 27°11′59″N 107°05′14″E	China	
	Longmen Bridge (Guangxi)	1,098 m (3,602 ft)	2024	Qinzhou, Guangxi; 21°45′12″N 108°33′16″E	China	
	Wufengshan Yangtze River Bridge	1,092 m (3,583 ft)	2020	Zhenjiang, Jiangsu; 32°13′37″N 119°40′30″E	China	
	Fatih Sultan Mehmet Bridge	1,090 m (3,576 ft)	1988	Istanbul, Bosphorus; 41°05′28″N 29°03′41″E	Turkey	
	Baling River Bridge	1,088 m (3,570 ft)	2009	Guanling County, Guizhou; 25°57′41″N 105°37′49″E	China	
	Taizhou Yangtze River Bridge	1,080 m (3,543 ft)	2012	Taizhou, Jiangsu; 32°14′49″N 119°52′35″E	China	(Note: Taizhou Yangtze River Bridge and Ma'anshan Yangtze River Bridge have two consecutive main spans of 1,080 metres (3,540 ft) long each.)
	Ma'anshan Yangtze River Bridge	1,080 m (3,543 ft)	2013	Ma'anshan, Anhui; 31°36′50″N 118°23′35″E	China	
	Zangkejiang Bridge	1,080 m (3,543 ft)	2025	Shuicheng–Pu'an, Guizhou; 26°09′59″N 105°06′45″E	China	
	Bosphorus Bridge	1,074 m (3,524 ft)	1973	Istanbul, Bosphorus; 41°02′44″N 29°02′03″E	Turkey	
	George Washington Bridge	1,067 m (3,500 ft)	1931	New York City, New York–Fort Lee, New Jersey; 40°51′06″N 73°57′09″W	United States	
	Fuma Yangtze River Bridge	1,050 m (3,445 ft)	2017	Wanzhou, Chongqing; 30°50′04″N 108°28′09″E	China	
	Qipanzhou Yangtze River Bridge	1,038 m (3,406 ft)	2021	Huangshi, Hubei; 30°09′09″N 115°16′02″E	China	
	Third Kurushima Kaikyō Bridge	1,030 m (3,379 ft)	1999	Imabari–Umashima, Ehime; 34°06′56″N 132°59′05″E	Japan	
	Second Kurushima Kaikyō Bridge	1,020 m (3,346 ft)	1999	Umashima–Ōshima, Ehime; 34°07′16″N 133°00′00″E	Japan	
	Xintian Yangtze River Bridge	1,020 m (3,346 ft)	2022	Wanzhou, Chongqing; 30°38′42″N 108°20′53″E	China	
	25 de Abril Bridge	1,013 m (3,323 ft)	1966	Lisbon–Almada, Lisboa Region; 38°41′39″N 9°10′41″W	Portugal	
	Forth Road Bridge	1,006 m (3,300 ft)	1964	South Queensferry–North Queensferry, Fife; 56°00′06″N 3°24′15″W	United Kingdom	
	Yidu Yangtze River Bridge	1,000 m (3,281 ft)	2021	Yidu, Hubei; 30°24′35″N 111°30′59″E	China	
Continued by: main spans of 500-1000 meters

== Bridges under construction ==
Most of the large suspension bridges built in recent years have been in the People's Republic of China. As the following list shows, most of the bridges under construction are also in China.

Photo	Name	Main span metres (feet)	Year to open	Location	Country	Ref.
	Zhangjinggao Yangtze River Bridge (South span)	2,300 m (7,550 ft)	2028	Zhangjiagang–Jingjiang–Rugao, Jiangsu; 32°01′35″N 120°31′38″E	China	
	Second Sutong Yangtze River Bridge	2,300 m (7,550 ft)	2031	Suzhou–Nantong, Jiangsu; 31°54′41″N 120°51′20″E	China	
	Shiziyang Bridge	2,180 m (7,150 ft)	2028	Guangzhou–Dongguan, Guangdong; 22°51′13″N 113°33′59″E	China	
	Yanji Yangtze River Bridge	1,860 m (6,100 ft)	2026	Huanggang–Ezhou, Hubei; 30°24′26″N 114°59′11″E	China	
	Shuangyumen Bridge	1,768 m (5,800 ft)	2027	Zhoushan, Zhejiang; 29°43′35″N 122°02′14″E	China	
	Lugu Lake Bridge	1,680 m (5,510 ft)	2027	Yanyuan County, Sichuan; 27°40′26″N 101°07′52″E	China	
	Hannan Yangtze River Bridge	1,600 m (5,250 ft)	2027	Wuhan–Xianning, Hubei; 30°17′26″N 113°55′41″E	China	
	Xihoumen Rail/Road Bridge	1,488 m (4,880 ft)	2026	Zhoushan, Zhejiang; 30°04′59″N 121°53′55″E	China	
	Yongchang Lancang River Bridge	1,416 m (4,650 ft)	2028	Changning County, Yunnan; 24°53′30″N 99°44′39″E	China	
	Wuhu Taishan Road Yangtze River Bridge	1,410 m (4,626 ft)		Wuhu, Anhui; 31°28′10″N 118°20′30″E	China	
	Tsing Lung Bridge	1,300 m (4,265 ft)	2033	Tsing Lung Tau–Lantau Island, Hong Kong; 22°21′07″N 114°02′35″E	China	
	Zhangjinggao Yangtze River Bridge (North span)	1,208 m (3,960 ft)	2028	Zhangjiagang–Jingjiang–Rugao, Jiangsu; 32°03′07″N 120°33′06″E	China	
	Yalong Liangshan Bridge	1,200 m (3,940 ft)	2028	Yanyuan County, Sichuan; 27°42′32″N 102°00′01″E	China	
	Nanjinguan Yangtze River Bridge	1,200 m (3,940 ft)	2028	Yichang, Hubei; 30°46′1″N 111°15′10″E	China	
	Chacao Channel bridge	1,155 m (3,790 ft)	2028	Pargua–Chacao, Los Lagos Region; 41°47′44″S 73°31′22″W	Chile	(Note: The Chacao Channel bridge has two main spans, one of 1,155 metres (3,789 ft) and one of 1,055 metres (3,461 ft).)
	Libu Yangtze River Rail/Road Bridge	1,120 m (3,670 ft)	2028	Jingzhou, Hubei; 30°17′14″N 112°04′33″E	China	
	Xingyi Yangtze River Bridge	1,120 m (3,670 ft)	2030	Fengdu, Chongqing; 29°56′28″N 107°47′49″E	China	
	Chuandian Jinsha River Bridge	1,060 m (3,480 ft)	2026	Ningnan County, Sichuan–Qiaojia County, Yunnan; 26°58′45″N 102°53′39″E	China	
	Sichuan-Tibet Railway Dadu River Bridge	1,060 m (3,480 ft)	2030	Luding County, Sichuan; 29°55′50″N 102°13′45″E	China	
	Sichuan-Tibet Railway Nu River Bridge	1,040 m (3,410 ft)	2030	Pasho County, Tibet Autonomous Region; 30°27′28″N 96°39′58″E	China	
	Kahaluo Jinsha River Bridge	1,030 m (3,380 ft)	2026	Leibo County, Sichuan–Yongshan County, Yunnan; 27°58′13″N 103°30′42″E	China	

== History of longest suspension spans ==
Photo	Bridge	Location	Length m (ft)	Years of longest span	Notes
Hypothesized support	Maya Bridge at Yaxchilan	Mexico	62 m (203 ft)	600–1430	Hemp-rope simple suspension footbridge. Existence unproven. No longer standing. Prior longest bridges are located in List of longest arch bridge spans. Exceeded by the masonry arch Trezzo sull'Adda Bridge from 1377 to 1416, with main span of 72 m.
	Chushul Chakzam	China; Tibet	137 m (449 ft)	1430–1820	Chain suspension footbridge south of Lhasa, built by Thangtong Gyalpo. Reported by British spies to still be in use in 1878. Later (before 1904) fell into disuse after river course changed, swamping the northern end. Dynamited by Chinese soldiers after the Battle of Chamdo in 1950.
	Union Chain Bridge	United Kingdom; Scotland–England	137 m (449 ft)	1820–1826	The oldest in the world still in use today.
	Menai Suspension Bridge	United Kingdom; Wales	176 m (577 ft)	1826–1834	
	Great Suspension Bridge	Switzerland; Fribourg	271 m (889 ft)	1834–1849	The bridge was replaced by the Zähringen Bridge in the 1920s.
	Wheeling Suspension Bridge	United States; West Virginia	308 m (1,010 ft)	1849–1866	The longest deck span from 1849 until 1866, and the oldest vehicular suspension bridge in use in the United States until 2019.
	Queenston-Lewiston Bridge	United States; Canada	317 m (1,040 ft)	1851–1866	The longest cable span from 1851 until it was destroyed by wind in 1864. However, the road deck span was only 258 meters long.
	John A. Roebling Suspension Bridge	United States; Kentucky–Ohio	322 m (1,056 ft)	1866–1869	
	Niagara Clifton Bridge	United States; Canada	384 m (1,260 ft)	1869–1883	Replaced in 1899.
	Brooklyn Bridge	United States; New York City	486 m (1,594 ft)	1883–1903	
	Williamsburg Bridge	United States; New York City	488 m (1,601 ft)	1903–1924	It was the longest suspension span but not the longest span of all bridges. The Forth Bridge, completed in 1890, a cantilever bridge with two spans of 521 m was longer until surpassed by the Quebec Bridge in 1917.
	Bear Mountain Bridge	United States; New York	497 m (1,631 ft)	1924–1926	It was the longest suspension span but not the longest span of all bridges. The Quebec Bridge completed in 1917, a cantilever bridge with a span of 549 m was longer until surpassed in 1929 by the Ambassador Bridge. The first suspension bridge to have a concrete deck. The construction methods pioneered in building it would make possible several much larger projects to follow.
	Benjamin Franklin Bridge	United States; Pennsylvania–New Jersey	533 m (1,749 ft)	1926–1929	It was the longest suspension span but not the longest span of all bridges.
	Ambassador Bridge	United States; Canada	564 m (1,850 ft)	1929–1931	Since this bridge was built, the record for longest bridge span has only been held by suspension bridges.
	George Washington Bridge	United States; New York – New Jersey	1,067 m (3,501 ft)	1931–1937	The first span longer than 1 km. Nearly double the length of any previously built bridge at the time of its opening.
	Golden Gate Bridge	United States; California	1,280 m (4,200 ft)	1937–1964	Also the longest bridge span in the world from 1937 to 1964
	Verrazzano–Narrows Bridge	United States; New York City	1,298 m (4,259 ft)	1964–1981	Also the longest bridge span in the world from 1964 to 1981
	Humber Bridge	UK; Yorkshire	1,410 m (4,630 ft)	1981–1998	Also the longest bridge span in the world from 1981 to 1998
	Akashi Kaikyo Bridge	Japan	1,991 m (6,532 ft)	1998–2022	Also the longest bridge span in the world from 1998 to 2022. The largest ever increase in length.
	Çanakkale 1915 Bridge	Turkey	2,023 m (6,637 ft)	2022–Present	The longest bridge span in the world since 2022. The first span longer than 2 km.

== Diagram of longest suspension spans ==
Bridge	Main span	Diagram
Strait of Messina Bridge project	3,300 m (10,830 ft)	
Zhangjinggao Yangtze River Bridge under construction	2,300 m (7,550 ft)	
1915 Çanakkale Bridge	2,023 m (6,640 ft)	
Akashi Kaikyo Bridge	1,991 m (6,530 ft)	
Nanjing Xianxin Yangtze River Bridge	1,760 m (5,770 ft)	
Golden Gate Bridge	1,280 m (4,200 ft)	

== Longest suspension footbridges ==
Photo	Name	Main span metres (feet)	Year to open	Location	Country	Ref.
	Bridge of National Unity (Hungary)	723 m (2,372 ft)	2024	Sátoraljaújhely, Northern Hungary; 48°23′24″N 21°38′23″E	Hungary	
	Sky Bridge 721	721 m (2,365 ft)	2022	Dolní Morava, Pardubice Region; 50°08′56″N 16°50′13″E	Czech Republic	
	Skywalk Willingen	665 m (2,182 ft)	2023	Willingen, Hesse; 51°16′29″N 8°37′00″E	Germany	
	Yundingfeidu Glass Footbridge	615 m (2,018 ft)	2021	Xuanhan County, Sichuan; 31°37′15″N 108°24′39″E	China	
	Canillo Tibetan Bridge	603 m (1,978 ft)	2021	Canillo; 42°34′37.5″N 1°36′48.9″E	Andorra	
	Haizhaigou UFO Glass Footbridge	600 m (2,000 ft)	2023	Pingliang, Gansu; 35°22′55.8″N 106°47′2.8″E	China	
	Castelsaraceno Footbridge	586 m (1,923 ft)	2020	Castelsaraceno, Potenza; 40°09′58″N 15°59′20″E	Italy	
	Gandaki Golden Footbridge	567 m (1,860 ft)	2020	Parbat DistrictBaglung District; 28°15′41″N 83°36′34″E	Nepal	
	Sellano Footbridge	517 m (1,696 ft)	2024	Sellano, Perugia; 42°53′26.4″N 12°55′49.7″E	Italy	
	Arouca 516	516 m (1,693 ft)	2021	Arouca, North Region; 40°57′51″N 8°10′30″W	Portugal	
	Wanjiazhai Dam Footbridge	500 m (1,600 ft)	1994	Jungar Banner, Inner Mongolia–Pianguan County, Shanxi; 39°34′50.8″N 111°25′43″E	China	
	Charles Kuonen Suspension Bridge	494 m (1,621 ft)	2017	Randa, Valais; 46°06′04″N 7°48′08″E	Switzerland	

== Other record-holding suspension bridges ==
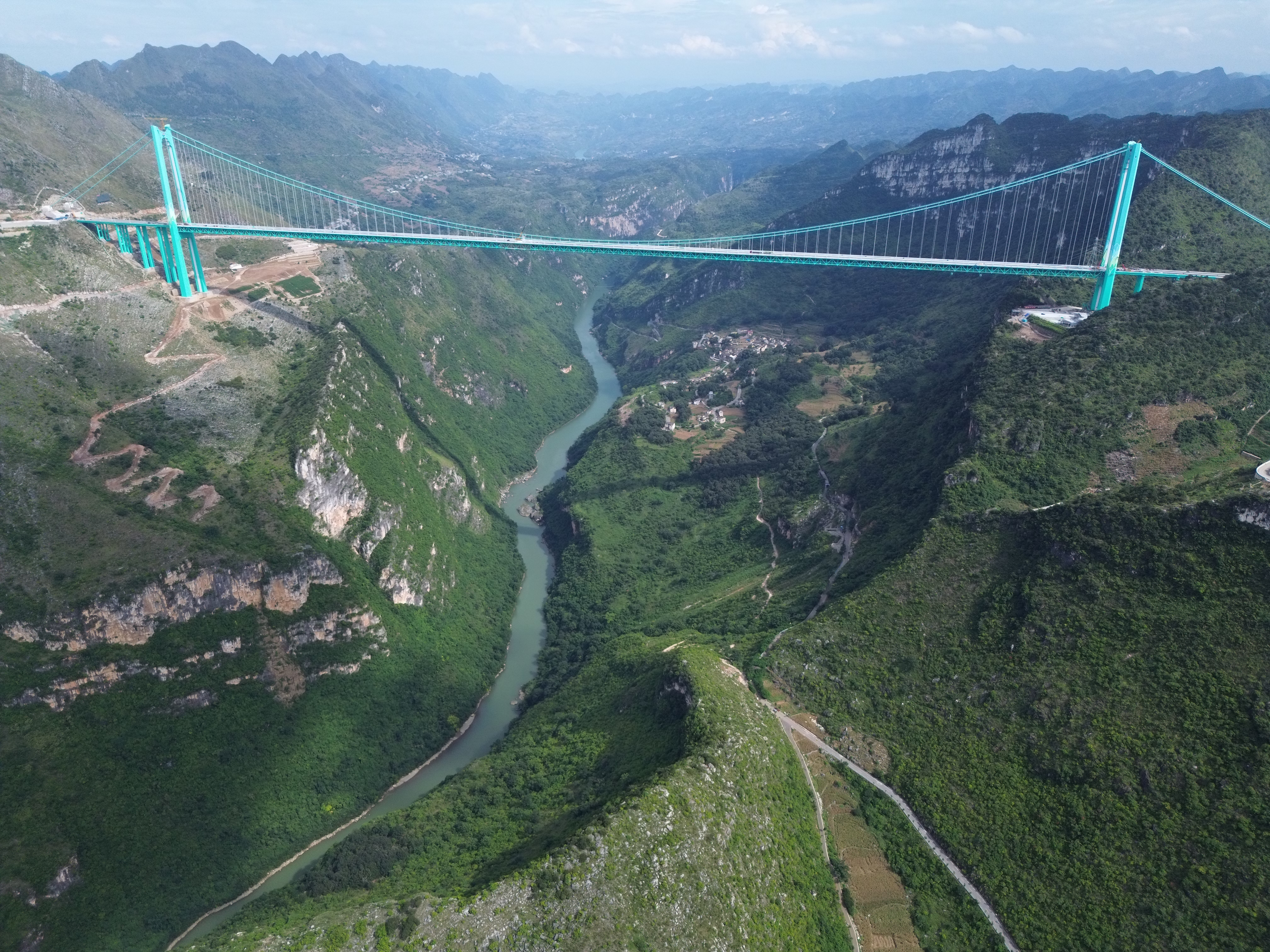
The Huajiang Canyon Bridge

- Huajiang Canyon Bridge (China). Opened in 2025, it is the highest suspension bridge in the world at 625 m elevation.
- San Francisco–Oakland Bay Bridge Eastern Span (California, United States). Opened in 2013, it is the widest bridge in the world (78.74 m [258.3 ft]), the most expensive bridge and the largest self-anchored suspension bridge ever constructed.
- Tacoma Narrows Bridges (Washington, United States). Opened in 1950 and 2007, the pair of bridges with the longest spans in the world (853 m [2,799 ft]).
- Yavuz Sultan Selim Bridge (Turkey). Opened in 2016, it has the longest span carrying both road and rail traffic (1,408 m [4,619 ft]).
- Yangsigang Yangtze River Bridge (China). Opened in 2019 with the longest double deck span (1,700 m [5,600 ft]).
- George Washington Bridge (New York and New Jersey, United States). Opened in 1931, it is the suspension bridge with the most lanes of traffic (at fourteen total on two levels).
- Kurushima Kaikyō Bridge (Japan). Opened in 1999, it is the world's longest suspension bridge structure.
- Great Seto Bridge (Japan). Opened in 1978 and 1988, it is the longest two-tiered bridge system (but not all of the spans that make up the bridge system are suspension bridges).

== See also ==
- List of longest suspension bridge spans of main span between 500 and 1000 meters
- Cable-stayed suspension bridge
- List of longest bridges
- List of longest cable-stayed bridge spans
- List of longest masonry arch bridge spans
- List of longest arch bridge spans
- List of longest beam bridge spans
- List of highest bridges
- List of tallest bridges
