= Sutong Yangtze River Bridge =

Cable-stayed bridge, China

Sutong Bridge 苏通长江大桥
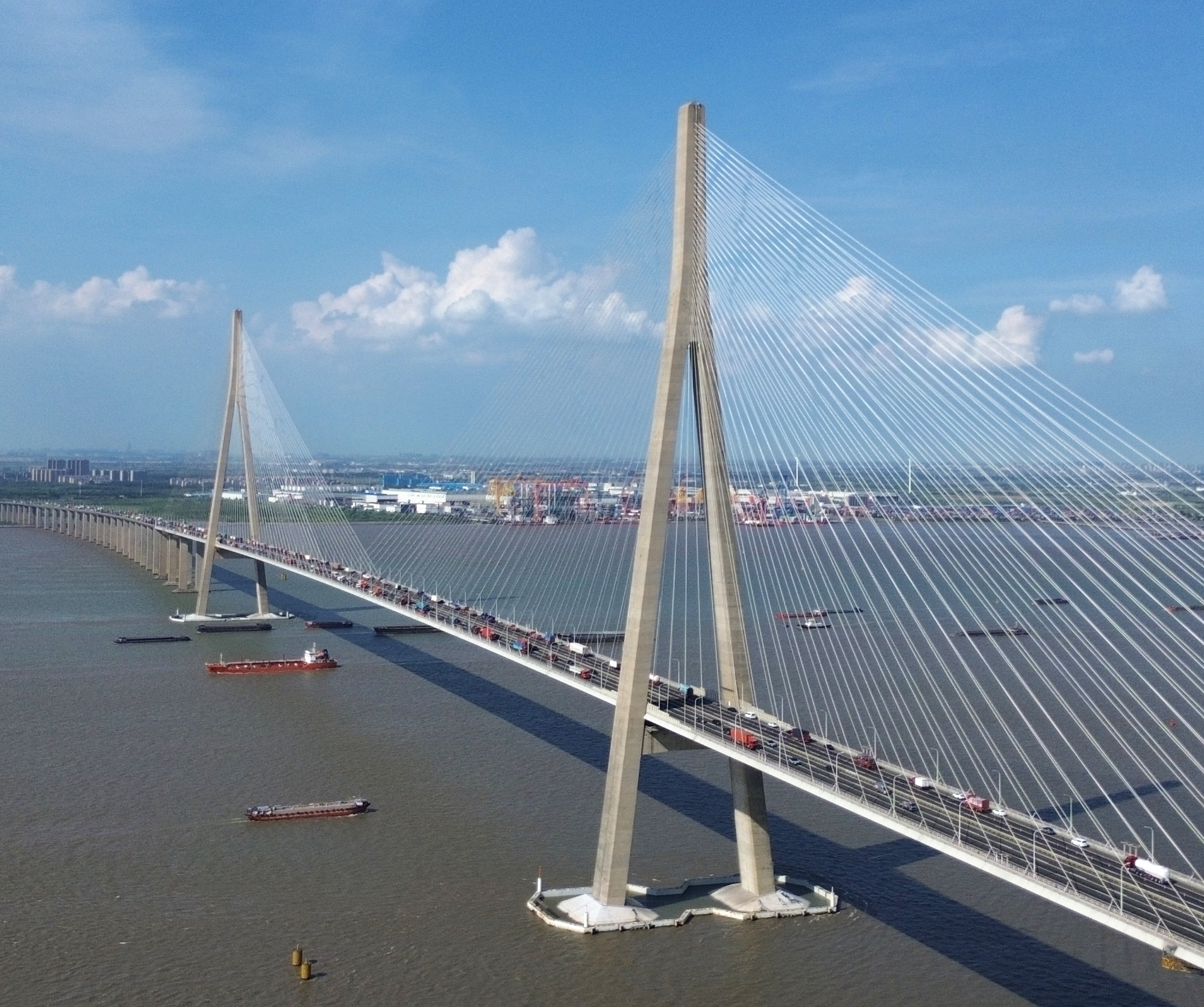
- Coordinates: 31°46′38″N 120°59′42″E
- Carries: G15 Shenyang–Haikou Expressway
- Crosses: Yangtze River
- Locale: Nantong / Changshu, Jiangsu, China

Characteristics
- Design: Cable-stayed
- Total length: 8,206 m (26,923 ft)
- Height: 300.4 m (986 ft)
- Longest span: 1,088 m (3,570 ft)
- Clearance below: 62 m (203 ft)

History
- Construction start: June 2003
- Construction cost: US$1.7 billion.
- Opened: May 25, 2008; 18 years ago

Location
- Interactive map of Sutong Bridge

The Sutong Yangtze Bridge (Chinese: 苏通长江大桥; Wu Chinese pronunciation: [sutʰoŋ dadʒɔ], pinyin: Sūtōng Chángjiāng Dàqiáo) is a cable-stayed bridge that spans the Yangtze in China between Nantong and Changshu, a satellite city of Suzhou, in Jiangsu province.

== Design and construction ==
The Sutong Yangtze River Bridge was designed by Dr. Robin Sham, CBE, FICE, a Hong Kong-born and British-based structural engineer who specializes in bridges. With a span of 1,088 metres (3,570 ft), it was the cable-stayed bridge with the longest main span in the world from 2008 to 2012. Its two side spans are 300 metres (980 ft) each, and there are also four small cable spans. The bridge received the 2010 Outstanding Civil Engineering Achievement award (OCEA) from the American Society of Civil Engineers.

Two towers of the bridge are 306 metres (1,004 ft) high and thus the fifth tallest in the world. The total bridge length is 8,206 metres (26,923 ft). Construction began in June 2003, and the bridge was linked up in June 2007. The bridge was opened to traffic on 25 May 2008 and was officially opened on 30 June 2008. Construction has been estimated to cost about US$1.7 billion.

The completion of the bridge shortens the commute between Shanghai and Nantong, previously a four-hour ferry ride, to about an hour. It brings Nantong one step closer to becoming an important part of the Yangtze Delta economic zone, and has further attracted foreign investors into the city. The bridge is also pivotal in the development of poorer northern Jiangsu regions.

The tower is an inverted Y-shaped reinforced concrete structure with one connecting girder between tower legs. The bridge deck is a steel box girder with internal transverse and longitudinal diaphragms and fairing noses at both sides of the bridge deck. The total width of the bridge deck is 41 metres including the fairing noses.

The construction of Zhaodian-Huangdu Section of Nantong-Shanghai Railway was commenced in March 2014. Following the completion of subgrade, bridges, mainline track-laying, and "communication, signal, power and electrification" works, the integrated commissioning and test began on 20 April 2020.

== Gallery ==
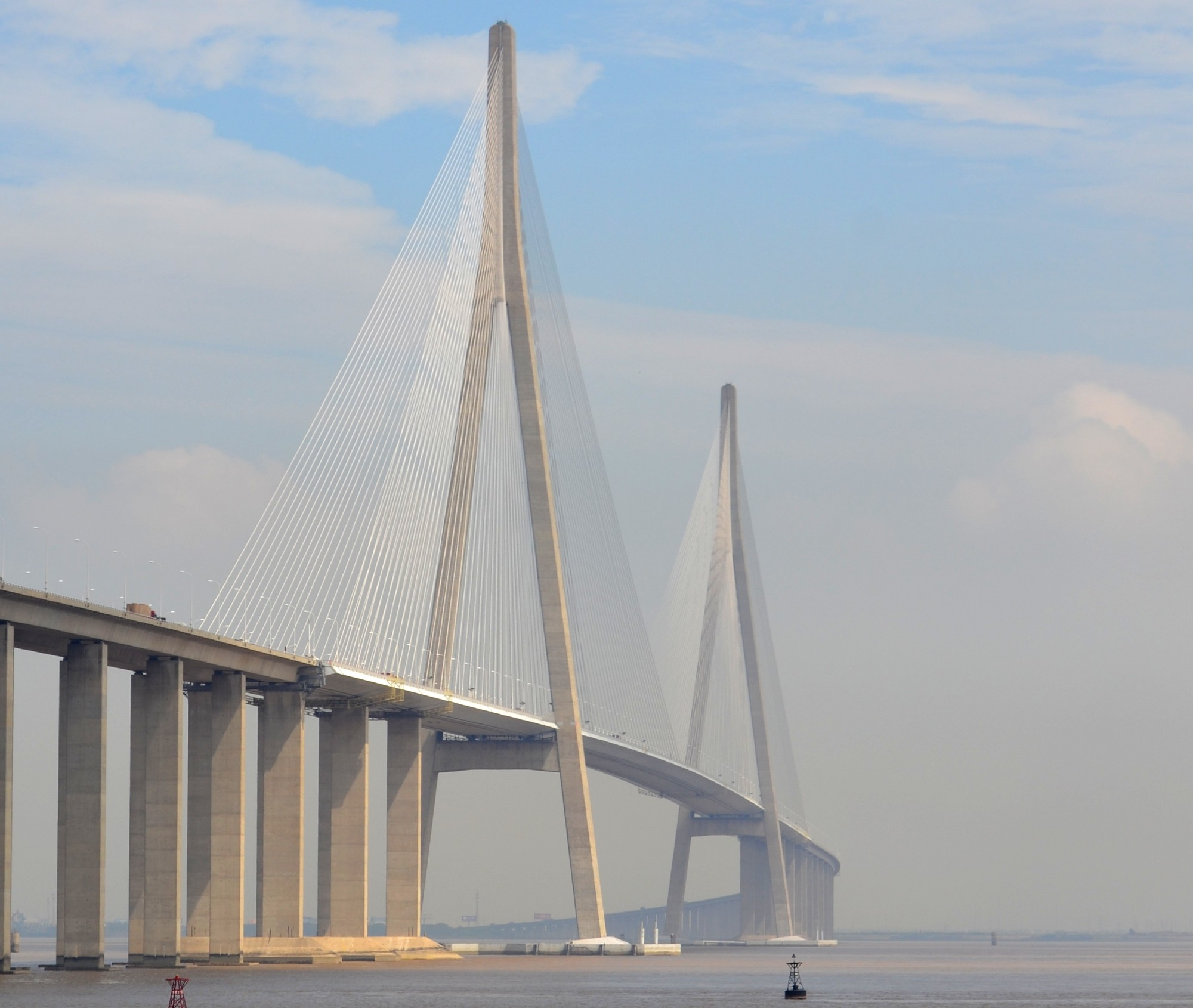
Sutong Yangtze River Bridge

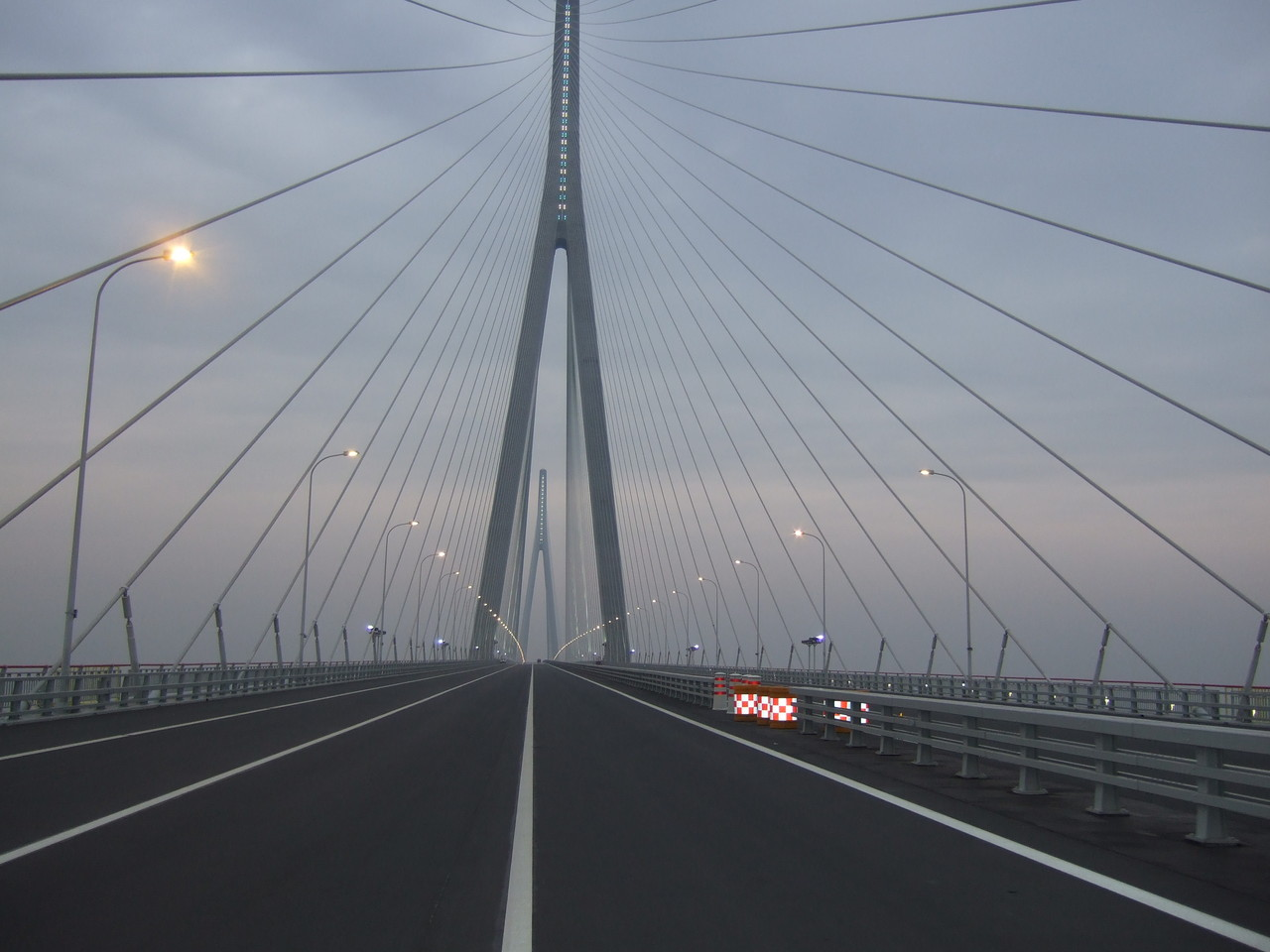
Road surface on the bridge.

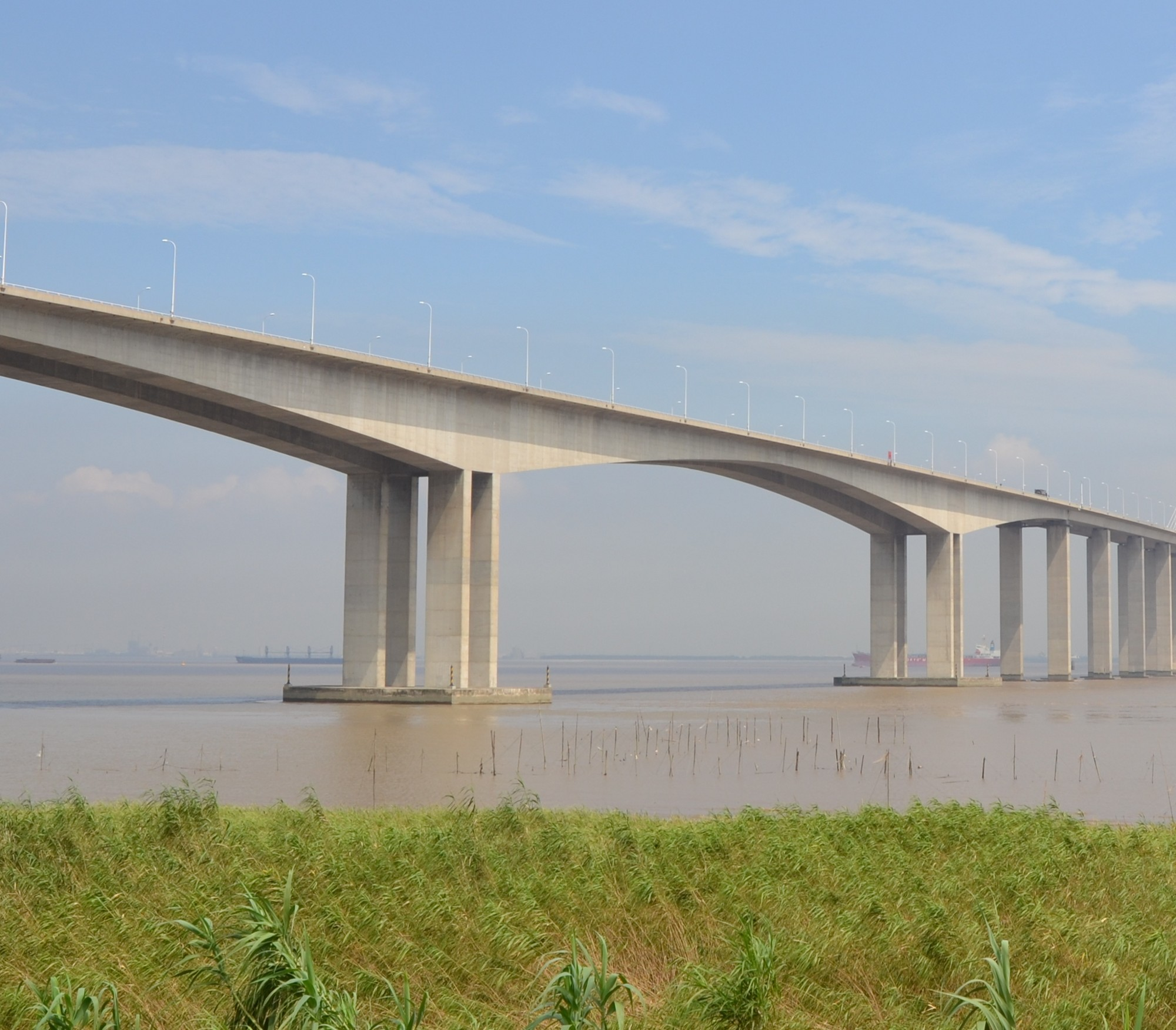
South bridge

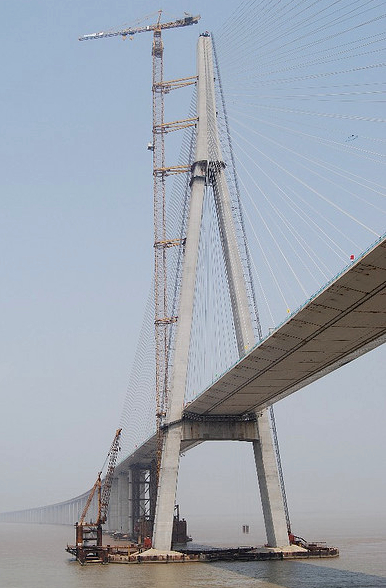
Bridge under construction in 2007.

== See also ==
- Second Sutong Yangtze River Bridge
- Husutong Yangtze River Bridge
- Zhangjinggao Yangtze River Bridge
- Bridges and tunnels across the Yangtze River
- List of bridges in China
- List of longest cable-stayed bridge spans
- List of tallest bridges in the world
