= Kaizhou Lake Bridge =

Kaizhou Lake Bridge 开州湖特大桥
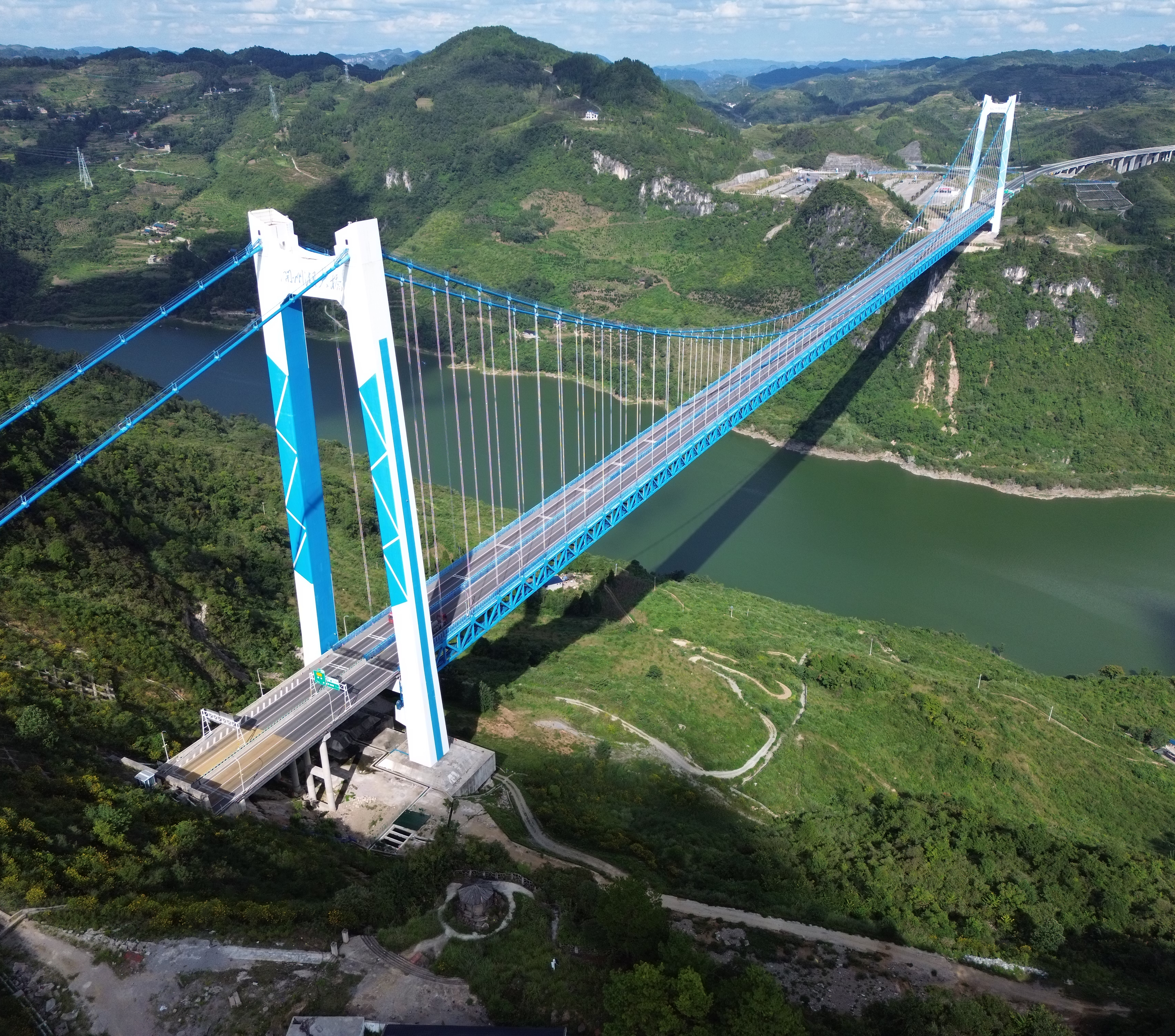
- Coordinates: 27°11′59″N 107°05′14″E
- Carries: S30 Weng'an–Kaiyang Expressway
- Crosses: Qingshui River (Guizhou)
- Locale: Kaiyang County, China

Characteristics
- Design: Suspension
- Material: Steel, concrete
- Width: 27 m (89 ft)
- Height: 139 m (456 ft); 135 m (443 ft)
- Longest span: 1,100 m (3,600 ft)
- Clearance below: 305 m (1,001 ft)
- No. of lanes: 4

History
- Construction end: 2021

Location
- Interactive map of Kaizhou Lake Bridge

The Kaizhou Lake Bridge (Chinese: 开州湖特大桥) is a suspension bridge over the Qingshui River (Guizhou) in Kaiyang County, China. The bridge is one of the longest suspension bridges with a main span of 1,100 m (3,600 ft).

== See also ==
- List of bridges in China
- List of longest suspension bridge spans
- List of highest bridges
