= Kahaluo Jinsha River Bridge =

Kahaluo Jinsha River Bridge 卡哈洛金沙江大桥
- Coordinates: 27°58′12.8″N 103°30′43.5″E
- Carries: S14 Dayong Expressway
- Crosses: Jinsha River
- Locale: Leibo County, Sichuan–Yongshan County, Yunnan, China

Characteristics
- Design: Suspension
- Material: Steel, concrete
- Longest span: 1,030 m (3,380 ft)
- Clearance above: 276 m (906 ft)

Location
- Interactive map of Kahaluo Jinsha River Bridge

The Kahaluo Jinsha River Bridge (Chinese: 卡哈洛金沙江大桥) is a suspension bridge under construction over the Jinsha River between Leibo County, Sichuan and Yongshan County, Yunnan, China. The bridge is one of the longest suspension bridges with a main span of 1,030 m (3,380 ft). The Xiluodu Dam domwnstream has increased the height of the Jinsha River.

== See also ==
- Bridges and tunnels across the Yangtze River
- List of bridges in China
- List of longest suspension bridge spans
- List of highest bridges
