= Maolin =

Maolin (茂林) may refer to the following locations in China:

- Maolin, Jing County, Anhui, town in Jing County, Anhui
- Maolin, Yulin, Guangxi, town in Yulin, Guangxi
- Maolin, Shuangliao, town in Shuangliao, Jilin
- Maolin, Yongshan County, town in Yongshan County, Yunnan

== See also ==
- Maolin District (茂林區), a rural district in Taiwan
