= Nanjiang railway station =

Railway station in Guiyang, Guizhou

Nanjiang 南江
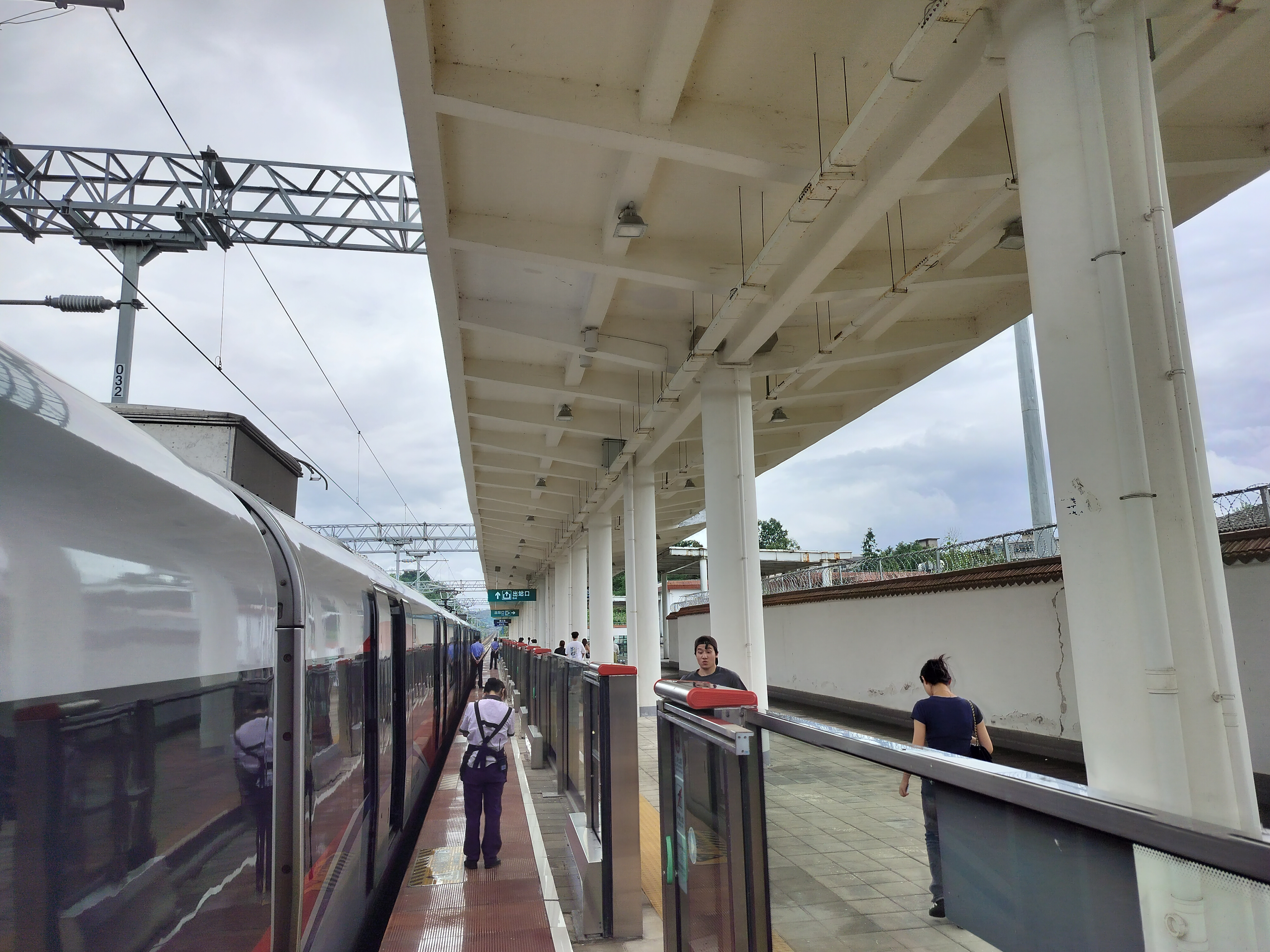

General information
- Location: Kaiyang County, Guiyang, Guizhou; China
- Coordinates: 26°53′50.75″N 106°58′9.80″E
- Line: Guiyang–Kaiyang intercity railway

History
- Opened: May 1, 2015
Location

Nanjiang railway station (Chinese: 南江站) is a railway station in Kaiyang County, Guiyang, Guizhou, China. It opened on 1 May 2015 and is an intermediate stop on the Guiyang–Kaiyang intercity railway.
