= Nanjinguan Yangtze River Bridge =

Nanjinguan Yangtze River Bridge 南津关长江大桥
- Coordinates: 30°46′1″N 111°15′10″E
- Carries: Yichang West Ring Expressway
- Crosses: Yangtze river
- Locale: Yichang, Hubei, China
- Preceded by: Xiling Yangtze River Bridge
- Followed by: Gezhouba Dam

Characteristics
- Design: 2 levels suspension bridge
- Material: Steel, concrete
- Width: 40.5 m (133 ft)
- Height: 190 m (620 ft) (north tower); 182 m (597 ft) (south tower)
- Longest span: 1,200 m (3,900 ft)
- Clearance below: 270 m (890 ft)

History
- Construction start: 28 June 2025
- Opened: 2028 (expected)

Location
- Interactive map of Nanjinguan Yangtze River Bridge

The Nanjinguan Yangtze River Bridge (Chinese: 南津关长江大桥) is a suspension bridge under construction over the Yangtze river in Yichang, Hubei, China. The bridge is one of the longest suspension bridges with a main span of 1,200 m (3,900 ft).

The bridge is situated between the Three Gorges Dam and the Gezhouba Dam.

== See also ==
- Bridges and tunnels across the Yangtze River
- List of bridges in China
- List of longest suspension bridge spans
- List of highest bridges
