= Kaiyang railway station =

Railway station in Guiyang, Guizhou

Kaiyang 开阳
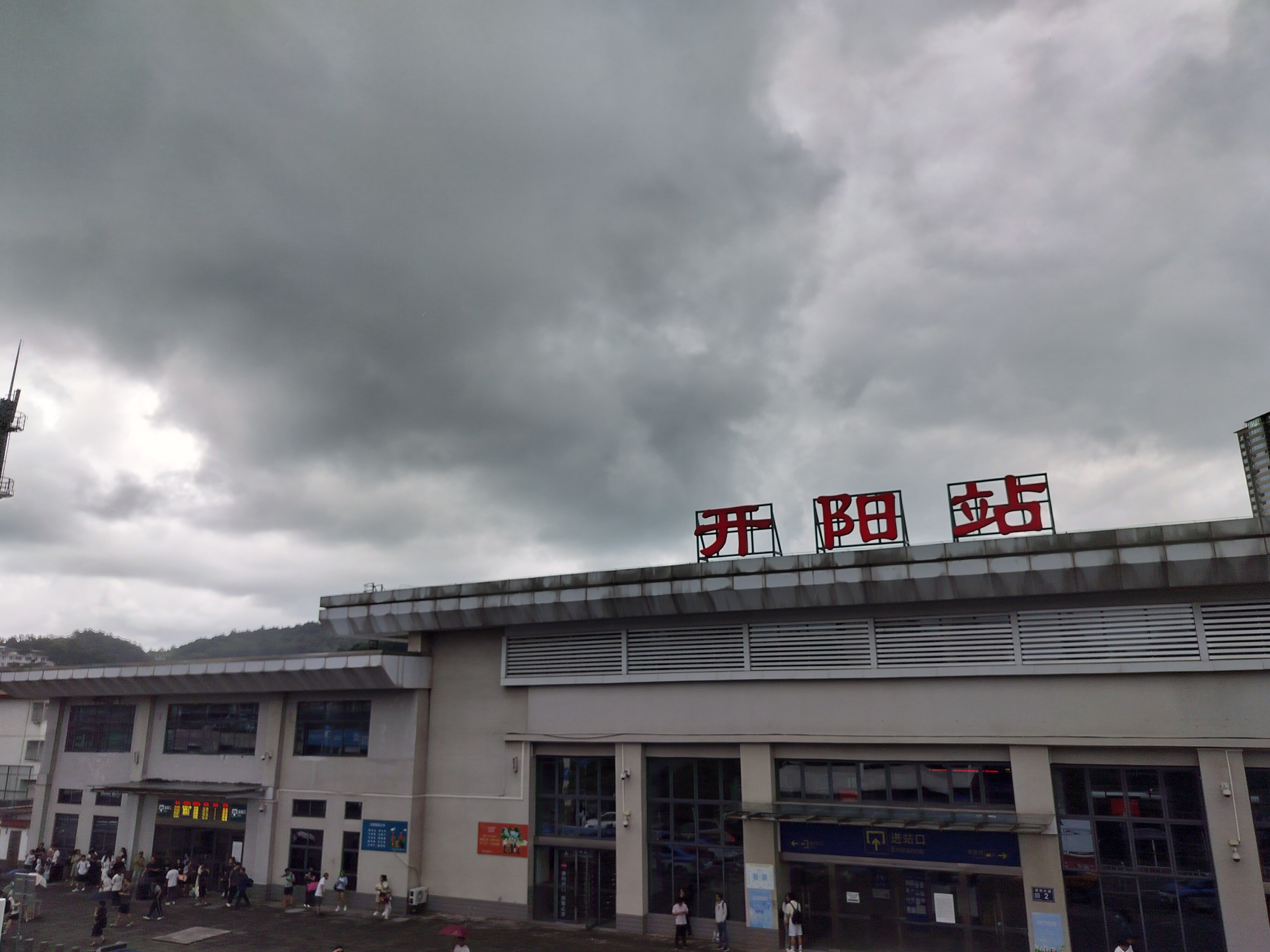

General information
- Location: Kaiyang County, Guiyang, Guizhou; China
- Coordinates: 27°2′42.37″N 106°58′10.75″E
- Line: Guiyang–Kaiyang intercity railway

Other information
- Station code: KVW (China Railway Telegraph Code); KYA (China Railway Pinyin Code)

History
- Opened: May 1, 2015
Location

Kaiyang railway station (Chinese: 开阳站) is a railway station in Kaiyang County, Guiyang, Guizhou, China. It opened on 1 May 2015 and is the northern terminus of the Guiyang–Kaiyang intercity railway.
