= Fuxing Yangtze River Bridge =

Fuxing Yangtze River Bridge 复兴长江大桥
- Coordinates: 30°55′32.6″N 108°46′24.6″E
- Carries: Kaizhou–Yunyang Expressway
- Crosses: Yangtze river
- Locale: Yunyang County, Chongqing, China

Characteristics
- Design: Suspension
- Material: Steel, concrete
- Width: 41.1 m (135 ft)
- Height: 215 m (705 ft) (north tower); 200 m (660 ft) (south tower)
- Longest span: 1,208 m (3,963 ft)
- No. of lanes: 6

History
- Opened: May 2026

Location
- Interactive map of Fuxing Yangtze River Bridge

The Fuxing Yangtze River Bridge (Chinese: 复兴长江大桥) is a suspension bridge over the Yangtze river in Yunyang County, Chongqing, China. The bridge is one of the longest suspension bridges with a main span of 1,208 m (3,963 ft). It is the river's first crossing that contains an expressway, intercity railway, and regular road within the same structure.

== See also ==
- Bridges and tunnels across the Yangtze River
- List of bridges in China
- List of longest suspension bridge spans
