= Second Dongting Lake Bridge =

Second Dongting Lake Bridge 洞庭湖二桥
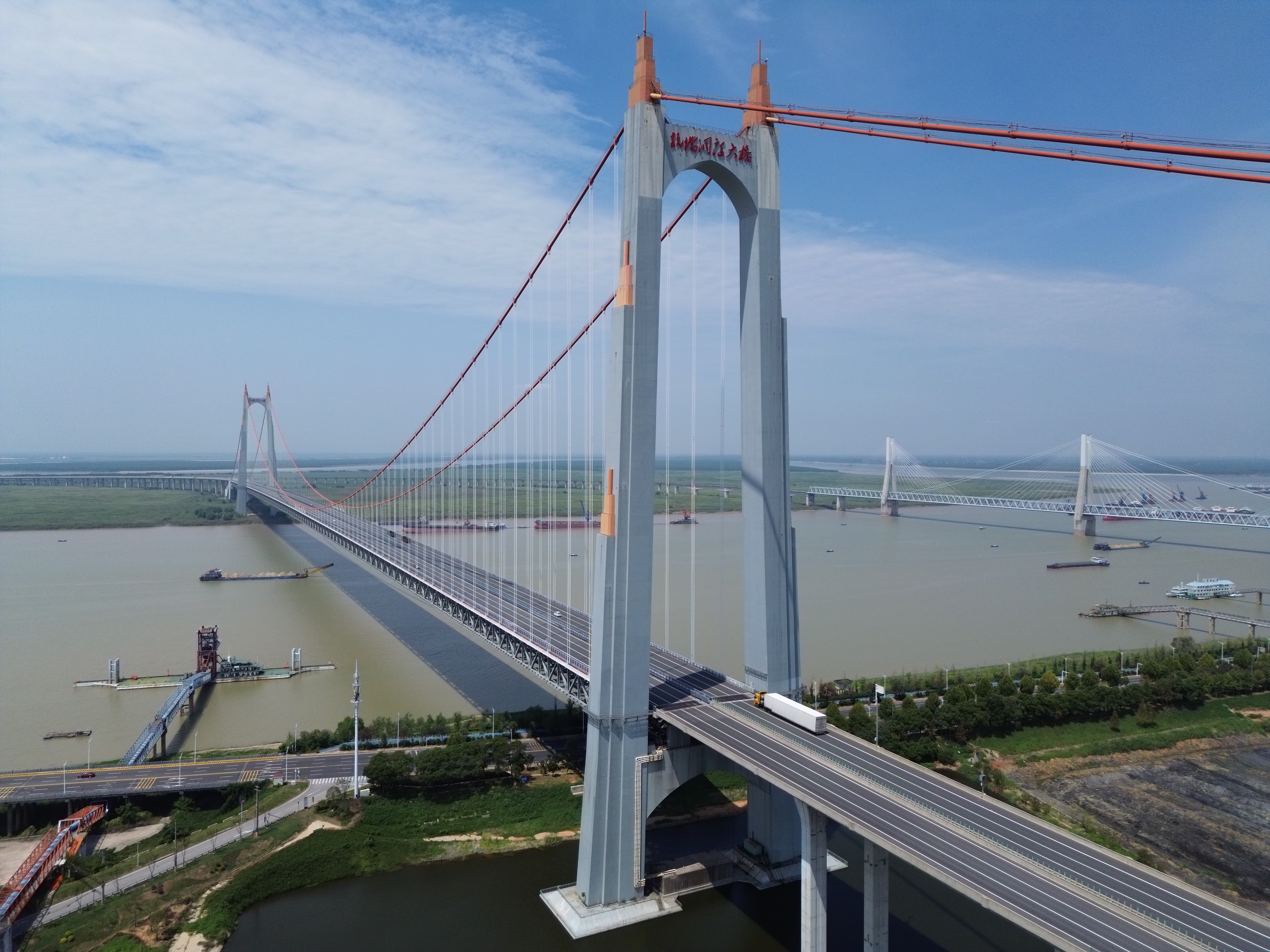
- Coordinates: 29°25′25″N 113°07′29″E
- Carries: G56 Hangzhou–Ruili Expressway
- Crosses: Dongting Lake
- Locale: Yueyang, Hunan, China

Characteristics
- Design: Suspension
- Material: Steel, concrete
- Width: 35.4 m (116 ft)
- Height: 203 m (666 ft)
- Longest span: 1,480 m (4,860 ft)
- No. of lanes: 6

History
- Construction start: 18 November 2013
- Construction end: 1 February 2018

Location
- Interactive map of Second Dongting Lake Bridge

The Second Dongting Lake Bridge (Chinese: 洞庭湖二桥), also known as Hangrui Expressway Dongting Lake Bridge (Chinese: 杭瑞洞庭大桥) is a suspension bridge over the link between the Dongting Lake and the Yangtze river in Yueyang, China. The bridge is one of the longest suspension bridges with a main span of 1,480 m (4,860 ft).

== See also ==
- Bridges and tunnels across the Yangtze River
- List of bridges in China
- List of longest suspension bridge spans
- List of tallest bridges
