= Shuangliu Yangtze River Bridge =

Shuangliu Yangtze River Bridge 双柳长江大桥
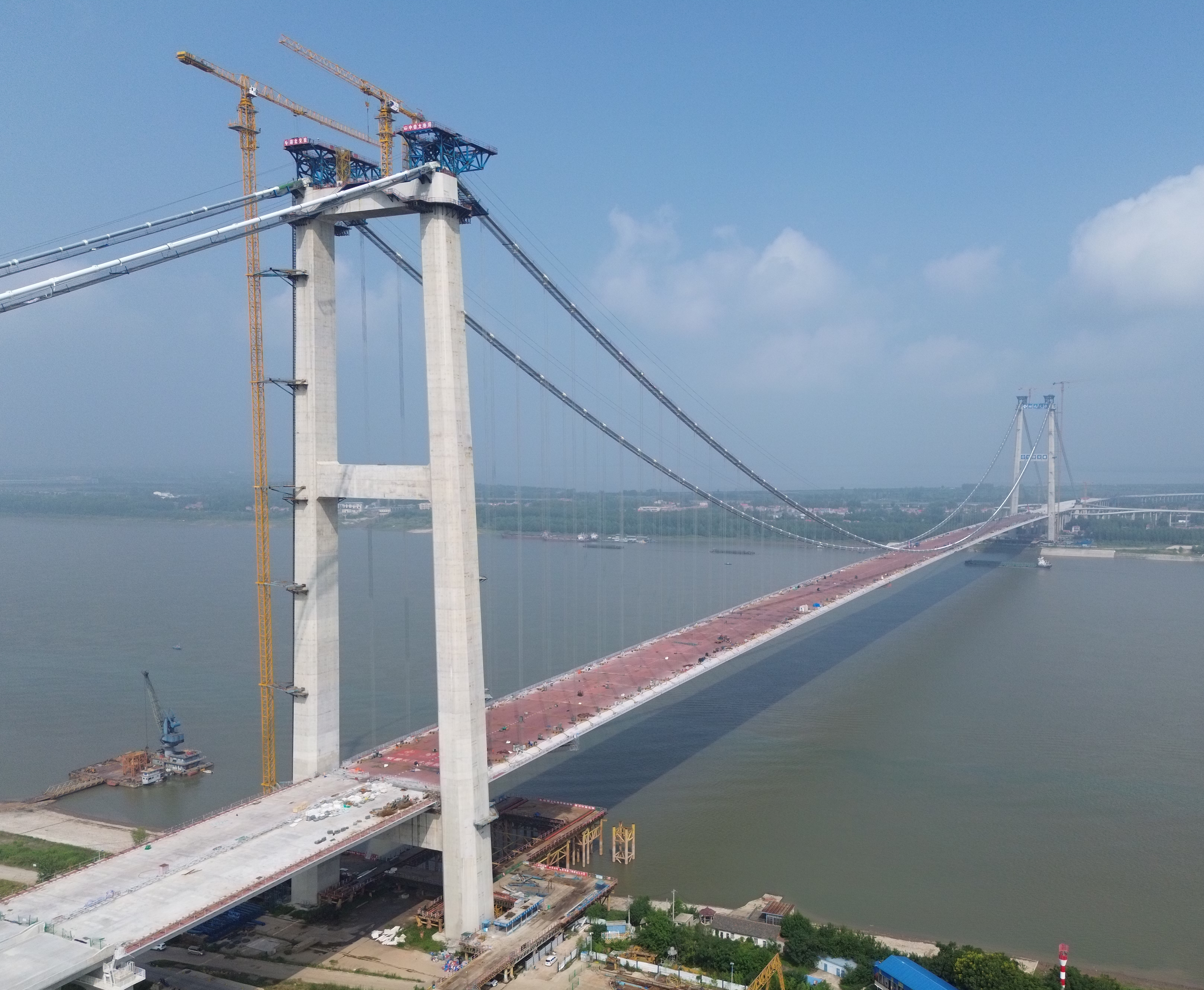
- Coordinates: 30°36′34″N 114°45′04″E
- Carries: G9906 Wuhan Metropolitan Area Ring Expressway
- Crosses: Yangtze river
- Locale: Wuhan–Ezhou, Hubei, China

Characteristics
- Design: Suspension
- Material: Steel, concrete
- Width: 50.5 m (166 ft)
- Height: south tower 212.78 m (698.1 ft)
- Longest span: 1,430 m (4,690 ft)
- No. of lanes: 8

History
- Construction end: 2026
- Opened: March 20, 2026

Location
- Interactive map of Shuangliu Yangtze River Bridge

The Shuangliu Yangtze River Bridge (Chinese: 双柳长江大桥) is a suspension bridge over the Yangtze river between Wuhan and Ezhou in China. The bridge is one of the longest suspension bridges with a main span of 1,430 m (4,690 ft).

== See also ==
- Bridges and tunnels across the Yangtze River
- List of bridges in China
- List of longest suspension bridge spans
