= Yongchang Lancang River Bridge =

Yongchang Lancang River Bridge 永昌澜沧江大桥
- Coordinates: 24°53′30″N 99°44′39″E
- Carries: Yongping-Changning Expy
- Crosses: Mekong
- Locale: Changning County, Yunnan

Characteristics
- Design: Suspension bridge
- Material: Steel, concrete
- Total length: 1,928 m (6,325 ft)
- Height: 248 m (814 ft) (east tower); 244 m (801 ft) (west tower)
- Longest span: 1,416 m (4,646 ft)
- Clearance below: 610 m (2,000 ft)
- No. of lanes: 4

History
- Construction end: 2028

Location
- Interactive map of Yongchang Lancang River Bridge

The Yongchang Lancang River Bridge (Chinese: 永昌澜沧江大桥) is a suspension bridge over the Mekong (known as the Lancangjiang in China) in Changning County, Yunnan, China. The bridge is one of the longest suspension bridges with a main span of 1,416 m (4,646 ft).

== See also ==
- List of bridges in China
- List of longest suspension bridge spans
- List of highest bridges
