= Xingyi Yangtze River Bridge =

Xingyi Yangtze River Bridge 兴义长江大桥
- Coordinates: 29°56′28″N 107°47′49″E
- Carries: Fengdu-Wulong Expressway
- Crosses: Yangtze river
- Locale: Fengdu County, Chongqing, China
- Preceded by: Second Fengdu Yangtze River Bridge
- Followed by: Zhongzhou Yangtze River Bridge

Characteristics
- Design: 2 levels suspension bridge
- Material: Steel, concrete
- Total length: 2,343 m (7,687 ft)
- Longest span: 1,120 m (3,670 ft)
- No. of lanes: upper level: 4 lower level: 4

History
- Construction start: October 2025
- Construction end: 2030 (planned)

Location
- Interactive map of Xingyi Yangtze River Bridge

The Xingyi Yangtze River Bridge (Chinese: 兴义长江大桥) is a suspension bridge under construction over the Yangtze river in Fengdu County, Chongqing, China. The bridge is one of the longest suspension bridges with a main span of 1,120 m (3,670 ft).

The total length of the project route is 160.5 kilometres (99.7 mi).

== See also ==
- Bridges and tunnels across the Yangtze River
- List of bridges in China
- List of longest suspension bridge spans
