= Fuma Yangtze River Bridge =

Fuma Yangtze River Bridge 万州驸马长江大桥
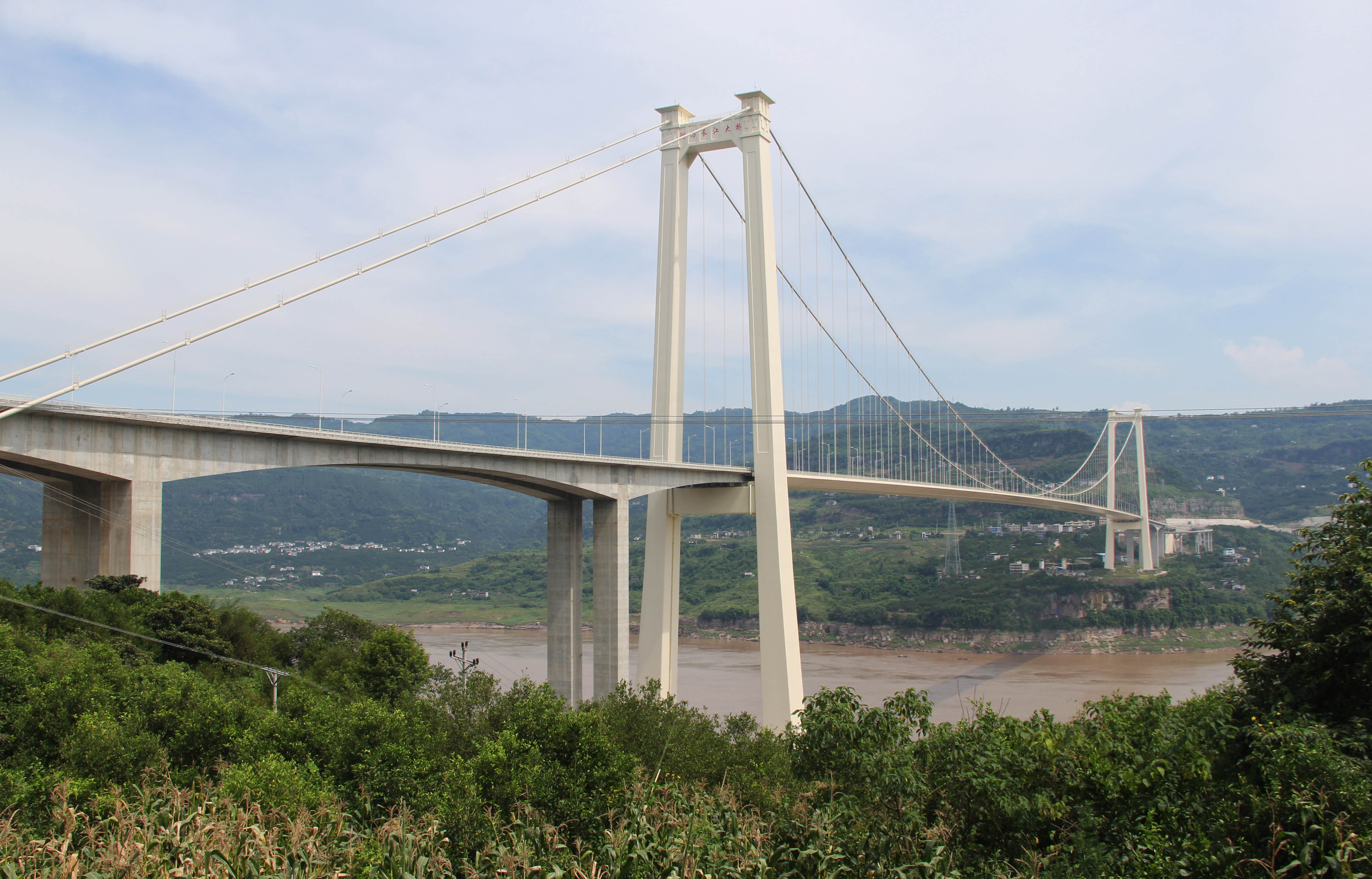
- Coordinates: 30°50′04″N 108°28′09″E
- Carries: G69 Yinchuan–Baise Expressway
- Crosses: Yangtze river
- Locale: Wanzhou, Chongqing, China

Characteristics
- Design: Suspension
- Material: Steel, concrete
- Width: 30 m (98 ft)
- Height: 210 m (690 ft) (north tower); 167 m (548 ft) (south tower)
- Longest span: 1,050 m (3,440 ft)
- No. of lanes: 4

History
- Construction end: 2017

Location
- Interactive map of Fuma Yangtze River Bridge

The Fuma Yangtze River Bridge (Chinese: 万州驸马长江大桥) is a suspension bridge over the Yangtze river in Wanzhou, Chongqing, China. The bridge is one of the longest suspension bridges with a main span of 1,050 m (3,440 ft).

== See also ==
- Bridges and tunnels across the Yangtze River
- List of bridges in China
- List of longest suspension bridge spans
