= Longmen Bridge (Guangxi) =

Longmen Bridge 龙门大桥
- Coordinates: 21°45′12″N 108°33′16″E
- Carries: China National Highway 228
- Crosses: Qinzhou Bay
- Locale: Qinzhou, Guangxi, China

Characteristics
- Design: Suspension
- Material: Steel, concrete
- Longest span: 1,098 m (3,602 ft)
- Clearance above: 44.6 m (146 ft)

History
- Construction end: 29 December 2024

Location
- Interactive map of Longmen Bridge

The Longmen Bridge (Chinese: 龙门大桥) is a suspension bridge over the Qinzhou Bay in Qinzhou, China. The bridge is one of the longest suspension bridges with a main span of 1,098 m (3,602 ft).

== See also ==
- List of bridges in China
- List of longest suspension bridge spans
