= Lugu Lake Bridge =

Lugu Lake Bridge 泸沽湖特大桥
- Coordinates: 27°40′26″N 101°07′52″E
- Carries: G7611 Duyun–Shangri-La Expressway
- Crosses: Woluo River
- Locale: Yanyuan County, Sichuan

Characteristics
- Design: Suspension
- Material: Steel, concrete
- Total length: 1,922 m (6,306 ft)
- Height: 283 m (928 ft)
- Longest span: 1,680 m (5,510 ft)
- Clearance below: 493 m (1,617 ft)
- No. of lanes: 4

History
- Construction end: 2026

Location
- Interactive map of Lugu Lake Bridge

The Lugu Lake Bridge (Chinese: 泸沽湖特大桥), previously known as the Woluo River Bridge is a suspension bridge over the Woluo river in Yanyuan County, Sichuan, China. The bridge is one of the longest suspension bridges with a main span of 1,680 m (5,510 ft).

== See also ==
- List of bridges in China
- List of longest suspension bridge spans
- List of highest bridges
