= Guiyang–Kaiyang intercity railway =

Railway in Guizhou, China

Guiyang–Kaiyang intercity railway 贵开城际铁路

Overview
- Status: Operational
- Locale: Guanshanhu and Wudang districts; Kaiyang County; Guiyang, Guizhou
- Termini: Guiyang North; Kaiyang
- Stations: 6

Service
- Type: Higher-speed rail
- Operator(s): China Railway Chengdu Group

History
- Opened: May 1, 2015

Technical
- Line length: 62 km (39 mi)
- Track gauge: 1,435 mm (4 ft 8 1/2 in) standard gauge
- Operating speed: 160–200 km/h (99–124 mph)

Guiyang–Kaiyang intercity railway
- Simplified Chinese: 贵开城际铁路
- Traditional Chinese: 貴開城際鐵路
Transcriptions
Standard Mandarin
- Hanyu Pinyin: Guì-Kāi Chéngjì Tiělù

The Guiyang–Kaiyang intercity railway (Chinese: 贵开城际铁路) is a higher-speed railway within Guizhou province, connecting the provincial capital of Guiyang to Kaiyang. It starts at Guiyang North station, travelling 62 km (39 mi) north-east to Kaiyang station.

== History ==
Works on this project started on September 20, 2010, with construction completed by October 28, 2014. A feature of this new line is the Nanjiang Bridge (South River Bridge), as one of the world's highest bridges at 230 m (755 ft) high with a span of 176 m (577 ft). On December 16, 2014, testing and safety checks on the line was initiated. On May 1, 2015, the project was opened to the public and revenue operations commenced.

== Stations ==
Station Name	Chinese	Metro transfers/connections
Guiyang North	贵阳北	1
Guiyang East	贵阳东	
Luowansanjiang	洛湾三江	
Xiangsihe	相思河	
Baiyi	百宜	
Nanjiang	南江	
Kaiyang	开阳	
