= Shuangyumen Bridge =

Shuangyumen Bridge 双屿门特大桥
- Coordinates: 29°43′35″N 122°02′14″E
- Carries: S21 Liuheng Shugang Expressway
- Crosses: East China Sea
- Locale: Xiaoyangzhishan Island–Fodu Island; Putuo, Zhoushan, Zhejiang

Characteristics
- Design: Suspension
- Material: Steel, concrete
- Height: 254 m (833 ft) (west tower); 246.3 m (808 ft) (east tower)
- Longest span: 1,768 m (5,801 ft)
- No. of lanes: 6

History
- Construction end: 2027

Location
- Interactive map of Shuangyumen Bridge

The Shuangyumen Bridge (Chinese: 双屿门特大桥) is a suspension bridge under construction between the Xiaoyangzhishan Island and the Fodu Island in Putuo, Zhoushan, Zhejiang. The bridge is one of the longest suspension bridges with a main span of 1,768 m (5,801 ft).

== See also ==
- List of bridges in China
- List of longest suspension bridge spans
