= Tsing Lung Bridge =

Planned bridge in Tsing Lung Tau and North Lantau

- Coordinates: 22°21′09″N 114°02′33″E
- Carries: 6 lanes of roadway
- Crosses: Western Ma Wan Channel
- Locale: Tsing Lung Tau and North Lantau
- Official name: Tsing Lung Bridge

Characteristics
- Design: suspension bridge
- Longest span: 1,418 metres (4,652 ft)

History
- Opened: construction on hold

Statistics
- Daily traffic: road

Location
- Interactive map of Tsing Lung Bridge

Tsing Lung Bridge (青龍大橋) is a proposed suspension bridge in Hong Kong, from North Lantau to Tsing Lung Tau, in the western New Territories, between Tsuen Wan and Tuen Mun, forming part of the Route 10 North Lantau to Yuen Long Highway. The bridge and highway have not been constructed. At the time of its announcement in 2002, it would have been the world's 4th-longest suspension bridge, with a main span of 1,418 metres (4,652 ft) - 41 metres longer than the Tsing Ma Bridge. Detailed planning was then complete and construction was due to commence in 2003 and be open to traffic in 2008.

== See also ==
- List of longest suspension bridge spans
- List of tunnels and bridges in Hong Kong
