= Hannan Yangtze River Bridge =

Hannan Yangtze River Bridge 汉南长江大桥
- Coordinates: 30°17′26″N 113°55′41″E
- Carries: G9906 Wuhan Metropolitan Area Ring Expressway
- Crosses: Yangtze river
- Locale: Wuhan–Xianning, Hubei, China

Characteristics
- Design: Suspension bridge
- Material: Steel, concrete
- Total length: 2,894 m (9,495 ft)
- Height: 227 m (745 ft)
- Longest span: 1,600 m (5,200 ft)
- No. of lanes: 8

History
- Constructed by: China Railway Bridge Bureau
- Construction start: 2024
- Construction end: 2027

Location
- Interactive map of Hannan Yangtze River Bridge

The Hannan Yangtze River Bridge (Chinese: 汉南长江大桥) is a suspension bridge over the Yangtze river between Wuhan and Xianning, Hubei, China. The bridge is one of the longest suspension bridges with a main span of 1,600 m (5,200 ft). It's the 13th bridge over the Yangtze River in Wuhan.

The bridge is situated 56.6 kilometres (35.2 mi) downstream from the Jiayu Yangtze River Bridge and 37.1 kilometres (23.1 mi) upstream from the Wuhan Junshan Yangtze River Bridge.

== See also ==
- Bridges and tunnels across the Yangtze River
- List of bridges in China
- List of longest suspension bridge spans
