= Second Sutong Yangtze River Bridge =

Chinese suspended bridge

Second Sutong Yangtze River Bridge 苏通长江二桥
- Coordinates: 31°54′41″N 120°51′20″E
- Carries: 8 highway lanes
- Crosses: Yangtze River
- Locale: Suzhou and Nantong

Characteristics
- Design: East bridge: Cable-stayed suspension bridge West bridge: Cable-stayed bridge
- Material: Steel, concrete
- Height: East bridge: 380 m (1,247 ft)
- Longest span: East bridge: 2,300 m (7,546 ft); West bridge: 900 m (2,953 ft)

History
- Construction start: 2025
- Construction end: 2031 (prevision)

Location
- Interactive map of Second Sutong Yangtze River Bridge

The Second Sutong Yangtze River Bridge (Chinese: 苏通长江二桥) is an under-construction cable-stayed suspension bridge over the Yangtze River, linking Suzhou and Nantong in Jiangsu, China. It is situated between the Husutong Yangtze River Bridge upstream and the Sutong Yangtze River Bridge downstream.

== See also ==
- Bridges and tunnels across the Yangtze River
- List of bridges in China
- List of longest suspension bridge spans
