= Wuhu Taishan Road Yangtze River Bridge =

Wuhu Taishan Road Yangtze River Bridge 芜湖泰山路长江大桥
- Coordinates: 31°28′11″N 118°20′26″E
- Carries: S24 Hangzhou Hefei Expressway
- Crosses: Yangtze river
- Locale: Wuhu, Anhui, China
- Preceded by: Wuhu Yangtze River Bridge
- Followed by: Ma'anshan Yangtze River Rail-Road Bridge

Characteristics
- Design: Suspension bridge
- Material: Steel, concrete
- Longest span: 1,410 m (4,630 ft)

Location
- Interactive map of Wuhu Taishan Road Yangtze River Bridge

The Wuhu Taishan Road Yangtze River Bridge (Chinese: 芜湖泰山路长江大桥) is a suspension bridge under construction over the Yangtze river in Wuhu, Anhui, China. The bridge is one of the longest suspension bridges with a main span of 1,410 m (4,630 ft). It also includes a 550 m (1,800 ft) main span cable-stayed bridge on the second channel.

== See also ==
- Bridges and tunnels across the Yangtze River
- List of bridges in China
- List of longest suspension bridge spans
