= Yidu Yangtze River Bridge =

Yidu Yangtze River Bridge 宜都长江大桥
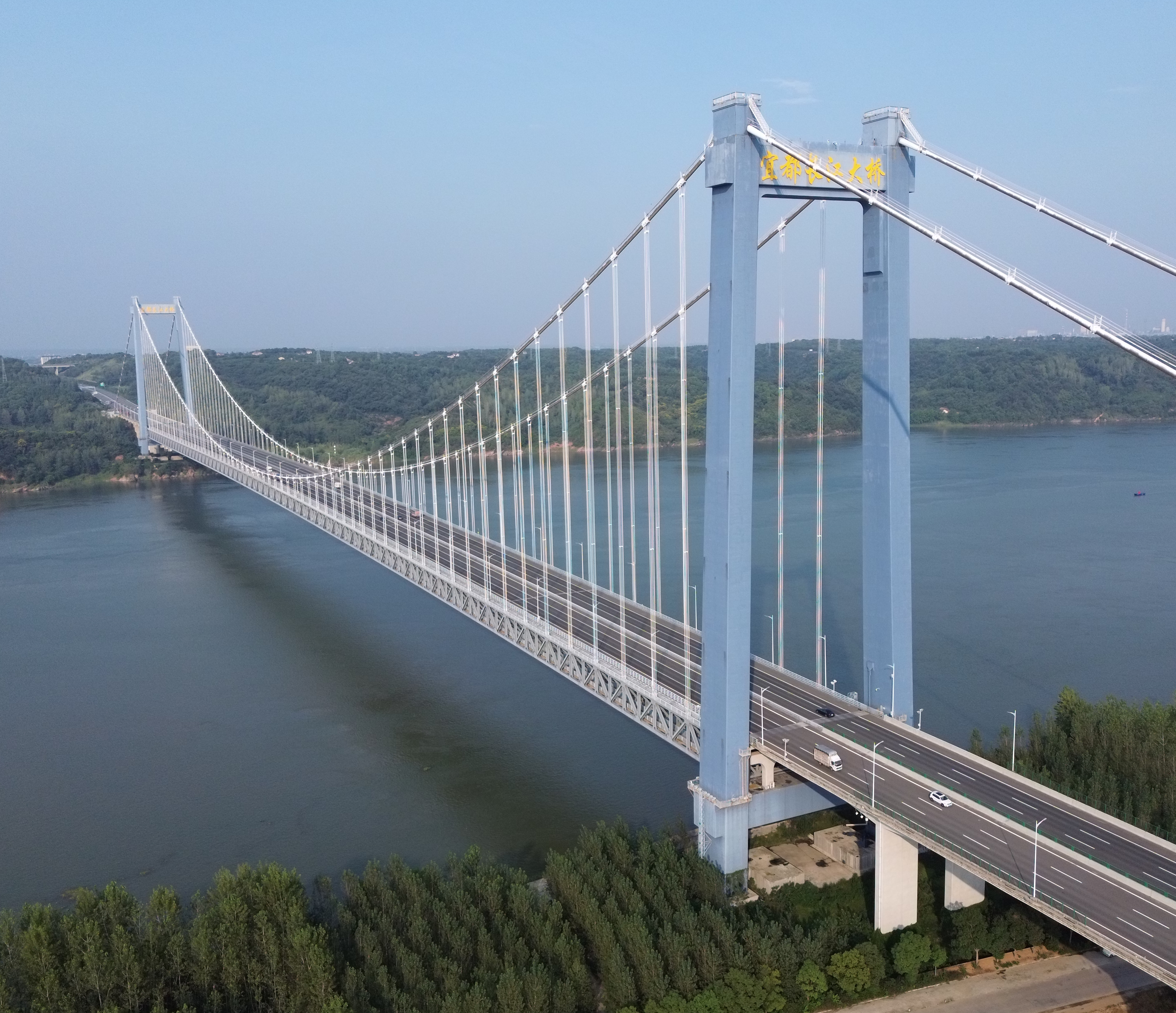
- Coordinates: 30°24′35″N 111°30′59″E
- Carries: G59 Hohhot–Beihai Expressway
- Crosses: Yangtze river
- Locale: Yichang, Hubei, China

Characteristics
- Design: Suspension
- Material: Steel, concrete
- Longest span: 1,000 m (3,300 ft)
- No. of lanes: 6

History
- Construction start: 8 August 2016
- Construction end: 9 February 2021

Location
- Interactive map of Yidu Yangtze River Bridge

The Yidu Yangtze River Bridge (Chinese: 宜都长江大桥) is a suspension bridge over the Yangtze river in Yichang, China. The bridge is one of the longest suspension bridges with a main span of 1,000 m (3,300 ft).

== See also ==
- Bridges and tunnels across the Yangtze River
- List of bridges in China
- List of longest suspension bridge spans
