= Xintian Yangtze River Bridge =

Xintian Yangtze River Bridge 新田长江大桥
- Coordinates: 30°38′42″N 108°20′53″E
- Carries: G5012 Enshi–Guangyuan Expressway
- Crosses: Yangtze river
- Locale: Wanzhou, Chongqing, China

Characteristics
- Design: Suspension
- Material: Steel, concrete
- Width: 30.5 m (100 ft)
- Height: 169.5 m (556 ft)
- Longest span: 1,020 m (3,350 ft)
- No. of lanes: 4

History
- Construction end: 2022

Location
- Interactive map of Xintian Yangtze River Bridge

The Xintian Yangtze River Bridge (Chinese: 新田长江大桥) is a suspension bridge over the Yangtze river in Wanzhou, Chongqing, China. The bridge is one of the longest suspension bridges with a main span of 1,020 m (3,350 ft).

== See also ==
- Bridges and tunnels across the Yangtze River
- List of bridges in China
- List of longest suspension bridge spans
