= Husutong Yangtze River Bridge =

Bridge in People's Republic of China

Husutong Yangtze River Bridge 沪苏通长江公铁大桥
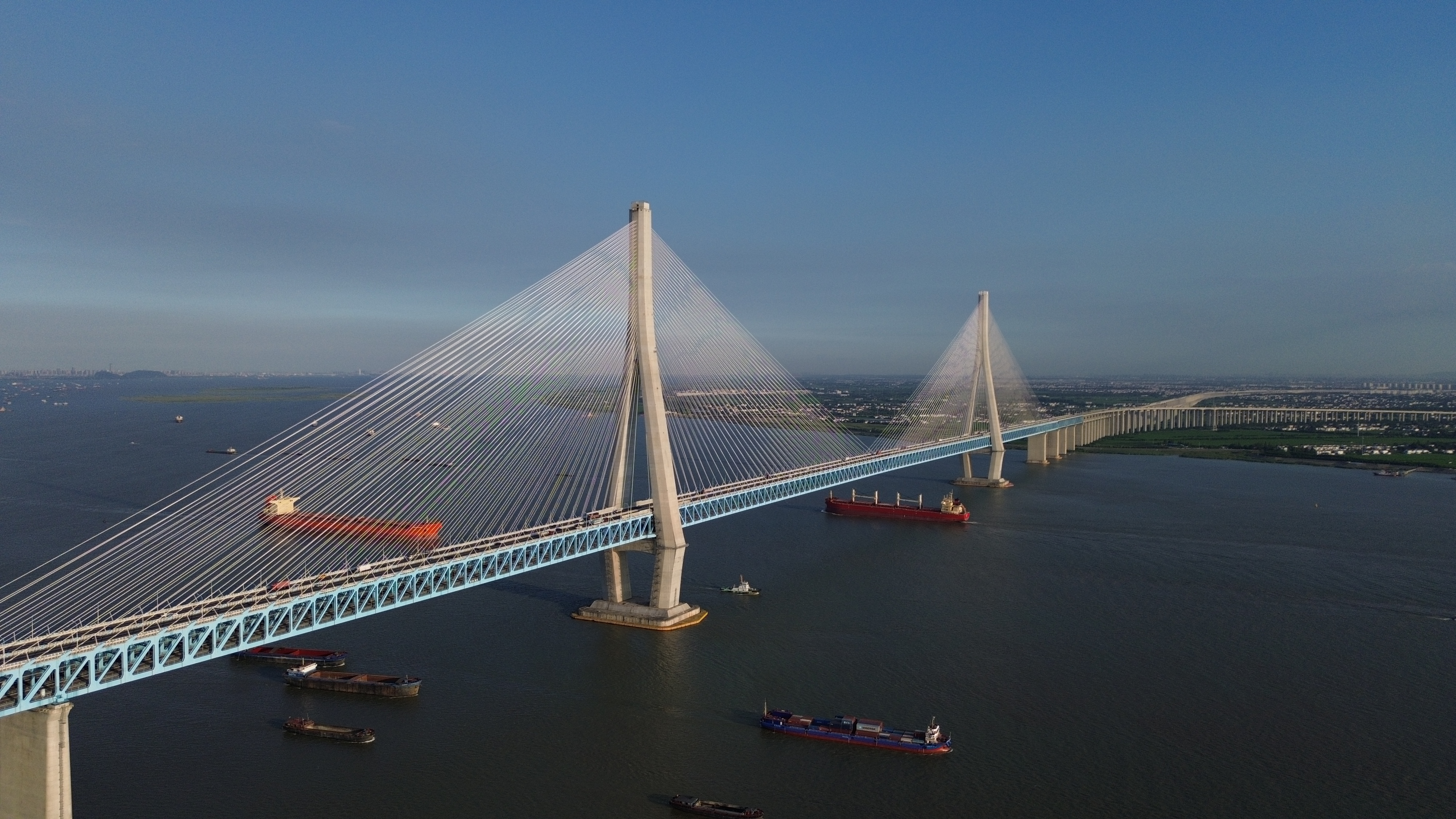
- Coordinates: 32°00′16″N 120°42′48″E
- Carries: Jiangsu S19; Tonghu Railway; Tongsujiayong Railway
- Crosses: Yangtze River
- Locale: Jiangsu, China

Characteristics
- Design: cable-stayed bridge; arch bridge
- Width: 35 metres (115 ft)
- Height: 330 metres (1,080 ft)
- Longest span: 1,092 metres (3,583 ft)
- Clearance below: 62 metres (203 ft)
- No. of lanes: 6 lane highway 4 track railway

History
- Construction start: 1 March 2014
- Opened: 1 July 2020 (Shanghai–Suzhou–Nantong railway)

Location
- Interactive map of Husutong Yangtze River Bridge

The Husutong Yangtze River Bridge is a combined rail and road bridge which crosses the Yangtze River in Jiangsu, China. It is the easternmost railway crossing of the Yangtze River.

Construction began on 1 March 2014. The bridge opened on 1 July 2020.

On its upper level, it carries a six-lane highway for the S19 Nantong–Wuxi Expressway. On its lower level, it carries four railway tracks with a design speed of 200 km/h for the Husutong railway, which opened on 1 July 2020, and the future Tongsujiayong high-speed railway. The main cable-stayed span is 1,092 metres (3,583 ft) long and is supported by two 330-metre (1,080 ft) tall towers. The secondary arch span is 336 metres (1,102 ft) long.

== See also ==
- Sutong Yangtze River Bridge
- Second Sutong Yangtze River Bridge
- Zhangjinggao Yangtze River Bridge
- Bridges and tunnels across the Yangtze River
- List of bridges in China
- List of longest cable-stayed bridge spans
- List of tallest bridges in the world
