= Qipanzhou Yangtze River Bridge =

Qipanzhou Yangtze River Bridge 棋盘洲长江公路大桥
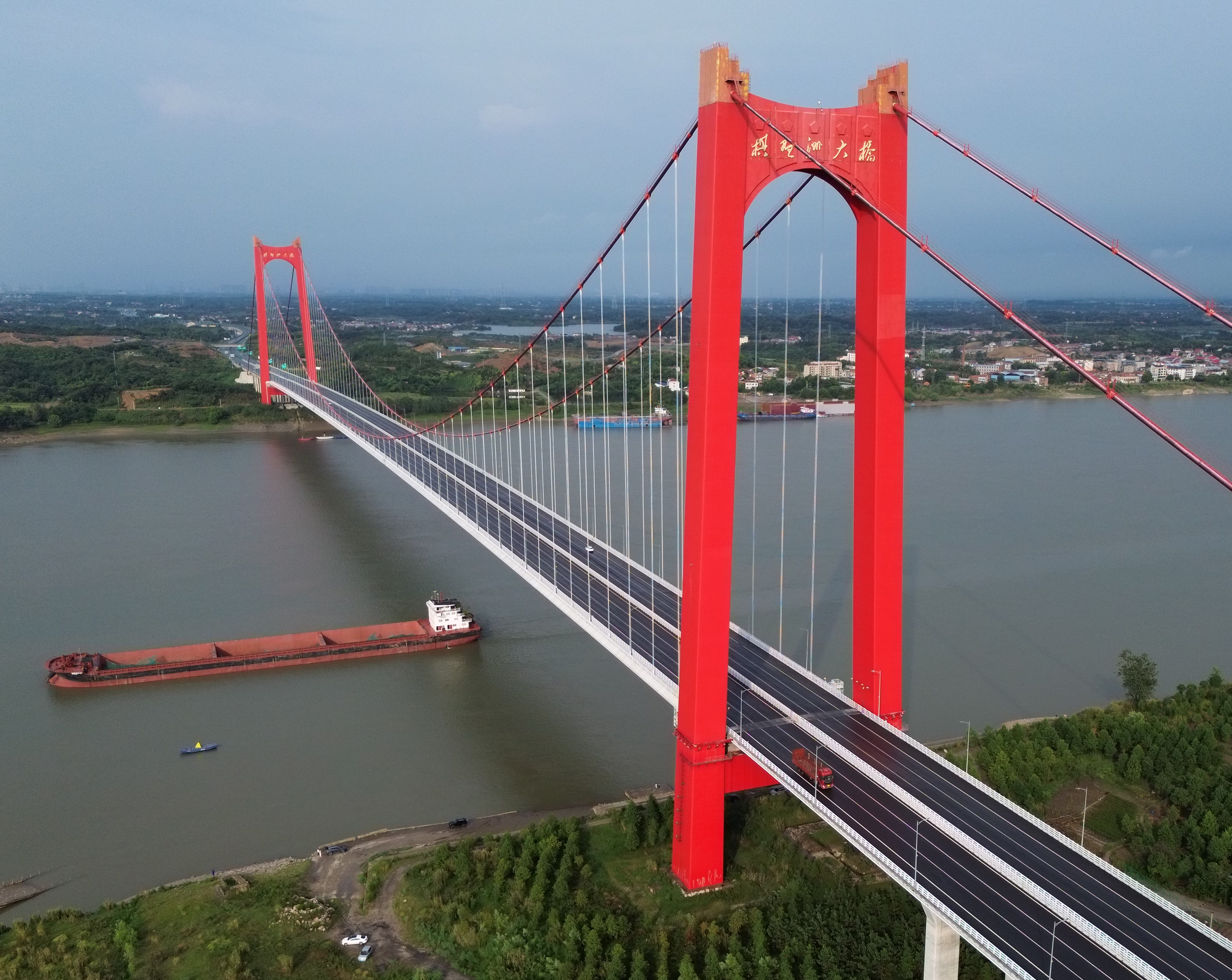
- Coordinates: 30°37′03″N 111°21′36″E
- Carries: S78 Qijia Expressway
- Crosses: Yangtze river
- Locale: Huangshi, Hubei, China

Characteristics
- Design: Suspension
- Material: Steel, concrete
- Width: 38.5 m (126 ft)
- Height: 156 m (512 ft) (south tower); 148 m (486 ft) (north tower)
- Longest span: 1,038 m (3,406 ft)
- No. of lanes: 6

History
- Construction start: 31 December 2016
- Construction end: 17 September 2021

Location
- Interactive map of Qipanzhou Yangtze River Bridge

The Qipanzhou Yangtze River Bridge (Chinese: 棋盘洲长江公路大桥) is a suspension bridge over the Yangtze river in Yichang, China. The bridge is one of the longest suspension bridges with a main span of 1,038 m (3,406 ft).

== See also ==
- Bridges and tunnels across the Yangtze River
- List of bridges in China
- List of longest suspension bridge spans
