= Chuandian Jinsha River Bridge =

Chuandian Jinsha River Bridge 川滇金沙江特大桥
- Coordinates: 26°58′43.4″N 102°53′38.6″E
- Carries: G4216 Chengdu–Lijiang Expressway
- Crosses: Jinsha River
- Locale: Ningnan County, Sichuan–Qiaojia County, Yunnan, China

Characteristics
- Design: Suspension
- Material: Steel, concrete
- Total length: 1,140 m (3,740 ft)
- Height: 172 m (564 ft) (east tower); 142 m (466 ft) (west tower)
- Longest span: 1,060 m (3,480 ft)
- Clearance above: 360 m (1,180 ft)

History
- Construction end: 2025

Location
- Interactive map of Chuandian Jinsha River Bridge

The Chuandian Jinsha River Bridge (Chinese: 川滇金沙江特大桥) is a suspension bridge under construction over the Jinsha River between Ningnan County, Sichuan and Qiaojia County, Yunnan, China. The bridge is one of the longest suspension bridges with a main span of 1,060 m (3,480 ft).

The bridge is less than one kilometer from the older Baihetan Jinsha River Bridge (Chinese: 白鹤滩金沙江大桥). The Baihetan Dam formed a reservoir on the Jinsha River.

== See also ==
- Bridges and tunnels across the Yangtze River
- List of bridges in China
- List of longest suspension bridge spans
- List of highest bridges
