= Zhangjinggao Yangtze River Bridge =

Chinese suspended bridge

Zhangjinggao Yangtze River Bridge 张靖皋长江大桥
- The bridge during construction in August 2025
- Coordinates: 32°01′55″N 120°31′42″E
- Carries: S91 Kemen Port Expressway
- Crosses: Yangtze River
- Locale: Zhangjiagang and Nantong

Characteristics
- Design: Suspension bridge
- Total length: 7,859 m (25,784 ft)
- Height: 350 m (1,148 ft)
- Longest span: 2,300 m (7,546 ft)
- Clearance below: 69.5 m (228 ft)

History
- Constructed by: China Railway Construction Corporation (CRCC); China Railway Hi-Tech Industry (CRHIC)
- Construction start: June 28, 2022
- Construction end: 2028 (prevision)

Location
- Interactive map of Zhangjinggao Yangtze River Bridge

The Zhangjinggao Yangtze River Bridge (Chinese: 张靖皋长江大桥) is an under construction suspension bridge over the Yangtze River in Zhangjiagang, China.

== Locale ==
The bridge spans the Yangtze River and is located between the cities of Zhangjiagang, Jingjiang, and Rugao. It is 28 kilometers downstream from the Jiangyin Yangtze River Bridge and 16 kilometers upstream from the Husutong Yangtze River Bridge.

== Description ==
With a central span of 2,300 m, it will become the longest suspension bridge in the world by 2028, surpassing the Çanakkale Bridge by a full 277 m.

The main tower of the Zhangjinggao Yangtze River Bridge is 350 m tall, equivalent to the height of a 125-story building, and will become the tallest suspension bridge tower in the world upon completion.

Elevation of the south bridge

== Construction progress ==
As of 15 June 2026, construction of the north anchorage for the Zhangjinggao Yangtze River Bridge’s south channel bridge was in full swing, with the installation of cable supports and anchorage blocks underway.

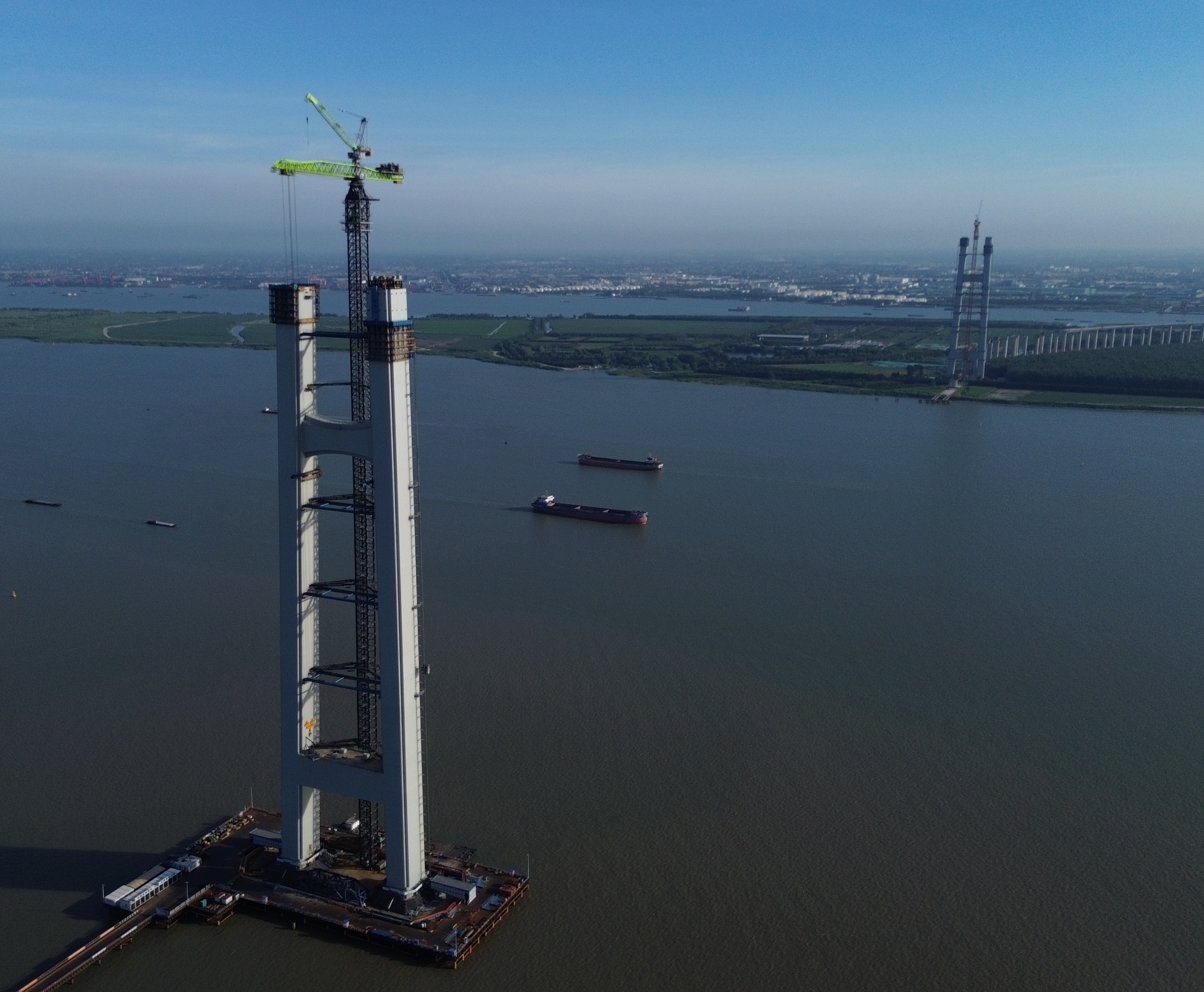

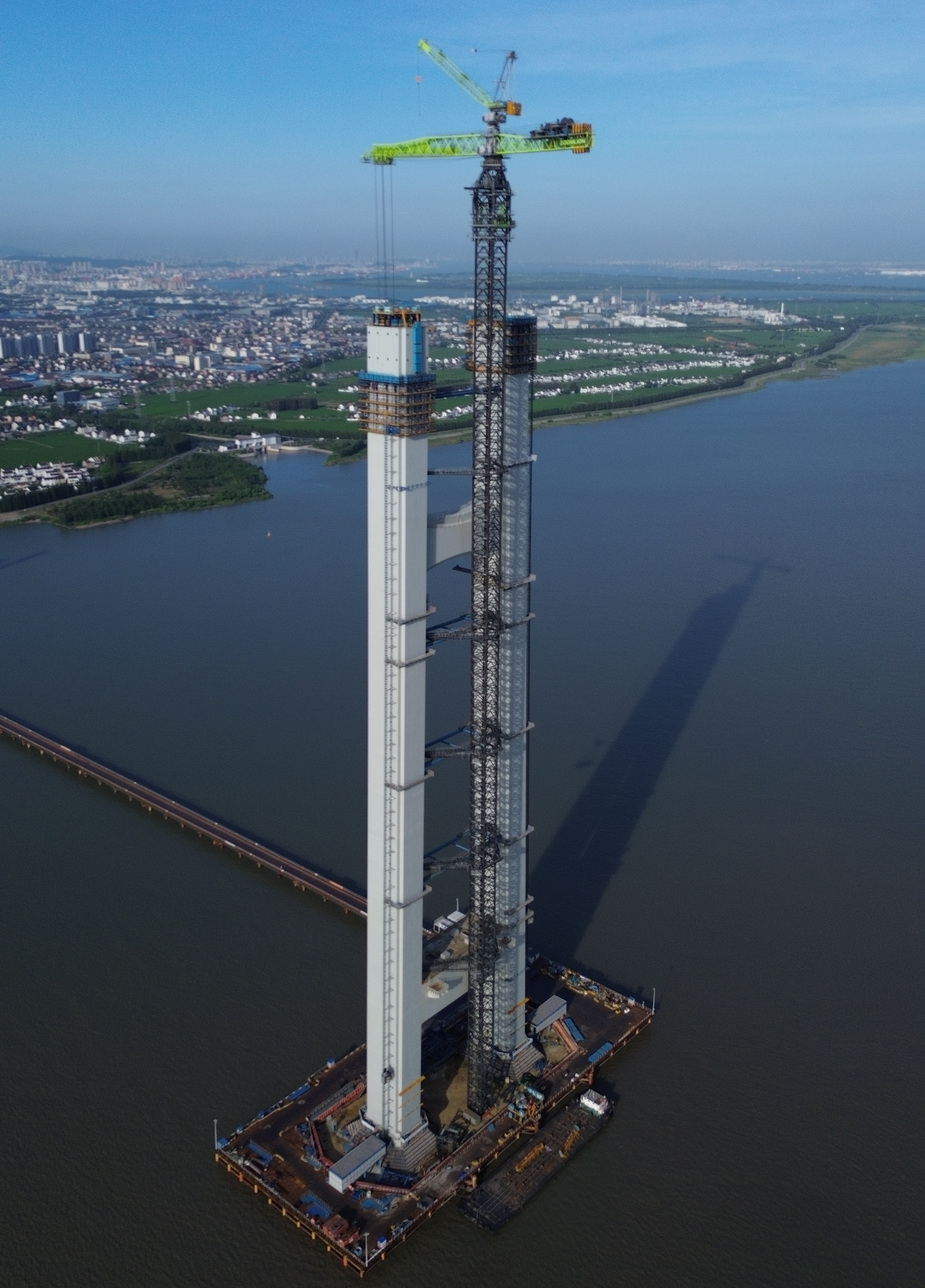

== See also ==
- List of longest suspension bridge spans
- List of bridges in China
- Bridges and tunnels across the Yangtze River
- Husutong Yangtze River Bridge
- Strait of Messina Bridge
- List of provincial expressways of China
