= Yongshan County =

Yongshan County 永善县
- County
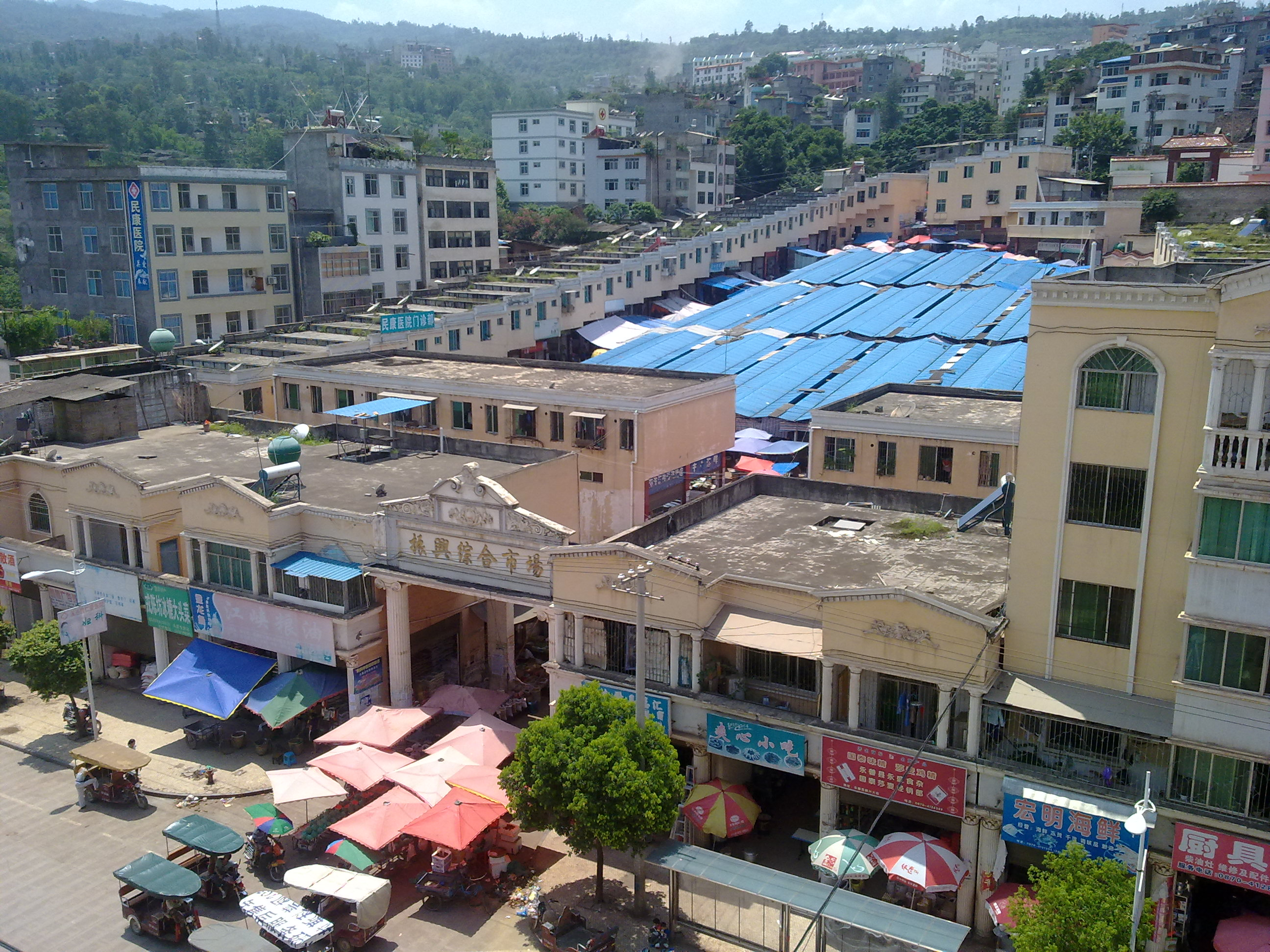

- Location of Yongshan County (red) and Zhaotong City (pink) within Yunnan

- Location of the seat in Yunnan
- Coordinates: 28°13′44″N 103°38′17″E
- Country: People's Republic of China
- Province: Yunnan
- Prefecture-level city: Zhaotong
- GB/T 2260: 530625

Area
  - Total: 2,883 km^{2} (1,113 sq mi)

Population
  - Total: 410,000
  - Density: 140/km^{2} (370/sq mi)
- Time zone: UTC+8 (CST)
- Postal code: 657300
- Area code: 0870
- Website: www.ynys.gov.cn

Yongshan County (Chinese: 永善县; pinyin: Yǒngshàn Xiàn) is a county in the northeast of Yunnan Province, China, bordering Sichuan Province to the north and northwest across the Jinsha River. It is under the administration of the prefecture-level city of Zhaotong.

== Ethnic groups ==
There are two main Yi ethnic subgroups in Yongshan County, namely Laluo (腊罗) and Niesu (聂苏).

== Administrative divisions ==
Yongshan County has 8 towns, 5 townships and 2 ethnic townships.

8 towns

- Xiluodu (溪洛渡镇)
- Huixi (桧溪镇)
- Huanghua (黄华镇)
- Maolin (茂林镇)
- Daxing (大兴镇)
- Lianfeng (莲峰镇)
- Wuji (务基镇)
- Makou (码口镇)

5 townships

- Tuanjie (团结乡)
- Xisha (细沙乡)
- Qingsheng (青胜乡)
- Shuizhu (水竹乡)
- Mohan (墨翰乡)

2 ethnic townships

- Manan Miao and Yi (马楠苗族彝族乡)
- Wuzhai Yi and Miao (伍寨彝族苗族乡)

=== Government ===
- Government address: Xiluodu Town, Yongshan County, Zhaotong, Yunnan 657300

== Poverty ==
Yongshan was a state-designated poor county, which means the average income of its people is below 530 yuan a year - that is, less than 30 US cents a day.

== Climate ==
Climate data for Yongshan, elevation 976 m (3,202 ft), (1991–2020 normals, extremes 1981–2010)
Month	Jan	Feb	Mar	Apr	May	Jun	Jul	Aug	Sep	Oct	Nov	Dec	Year
Record high °C (°F)	19.9 (67.8)	34.3 (93.7)	36.8 (98.2)	35.0 (95.0)	37.2 (99.0)	37.2 (99.0)	37.1 (98.8)	38.4 (101.1)	38.7 (101.7)	32.4 (90.3)	26.5 (79.7)	21.5 (70.7)	38.7 (101.7)
Mean daily maximum °C (°F)	10.1 (50.2)	13.3 (55.9)	18.2 (64.8)	23.5 (74.3)	26.4 (79.5)	27.8 (82.0)	30.5 (86.9)	30.3 (86.5)	25.9 (78.6)	20.6 (69.1)	17.1 (62.8)	11.6 (52.9)	21.3 (70.3)
Daily mean °C (°F)	6.9 (44.4)	9.2 (48.6)	13.2 (55.8)	18.0 (64.4)	21.1 (70.0)	23.0 (73.4)	25.1 (77.2)	24.8 (76.6)	21.4 (70.5)	17.1 (62.8)	13.3 (55.9)	8.4 (47.1)	16.8 (62.2)
Mean daily minimum °C (°F)	4.6 (40.3)	6.5 (43.7)	9.9 (49.8)	14.1 (57.4)	17.4 (63.3)	19.7 (67.5)	21.5 (70.7)	21.2 (70.2)	18.4 (65.1)	14.7 (58.5)	10.8 (51.4)	6.2 (43.2)	13.8 (56.8)
Record low °C (°F)	−3.3 (26.1)	−2.1 (28.2)	−0.1 (31.8)	3.7 (38.7)	8.9 (48.0)	13.9 (57.0)	15.3 (59.5)	14.8 (58.6)	11.3 (52.3)	3.3 (37.9)	1.5 (34.7)	−2.8 (27.0)	−3.3 (26.1)
Average precipitation mm (inches)	4.6 (0.18)	6.2 (0.24)	21.6 (0.85)	51.5 (2.03)	72.4 (2.85)	130.5 (5.14)	143.8 (5.66)	148.3 (5.84)	79.7 (3.14)	36.7 (1.44)	10.1 (0.40)	2.7 (0.11)	708.1 (27.88)
Average precipitation days (≥ 0.1 mm)	3.5	4.0	8.3	11.5	13.4	17.1	15.4	14.7	14.2	13.0	5.3	3.0	123.4
Average snowy days	1.5	0.6	0	0	0	0	0	0	0	0	0.1	0.4	2.6
Average relative humidity (%)	70	68	67	67	69	77	78	78	80	79	74	71	73
Mean monthly sunshine hours	53.3	69.5	103.0	124.9	116.2	91.8	142.5	147.9	87.6	54.5	69.6	54.6	1,115.4
Percentage possible sunshine	16	22	28	32	28	22	34	37	24	15	22	17	25
Source: China Meteorological Administration

== See also ==
- Xiluodu Dam
