= Kaiyang County =

Kaiyang County 开阳县
- County
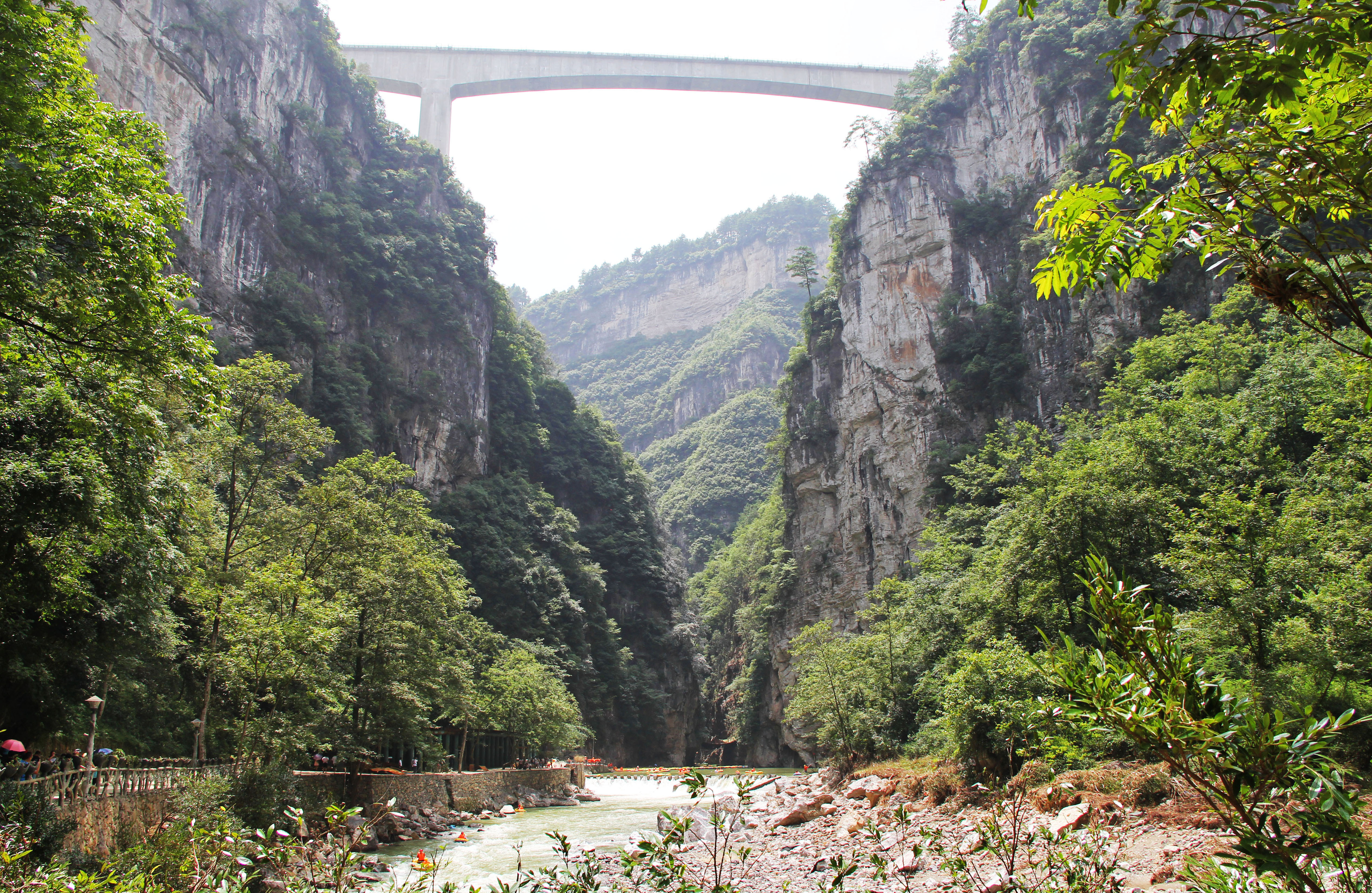

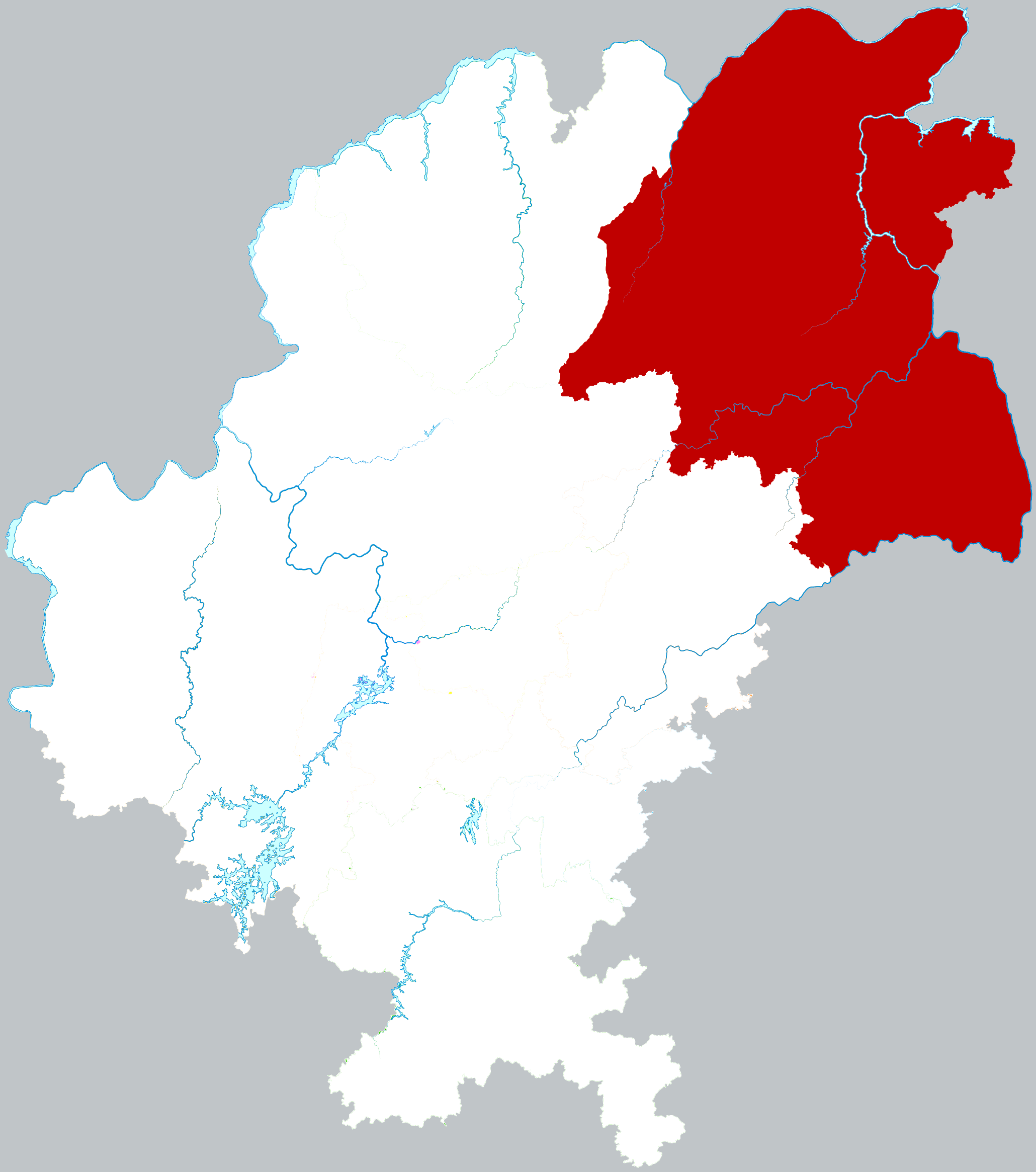
- Kaiyang in Guiyang

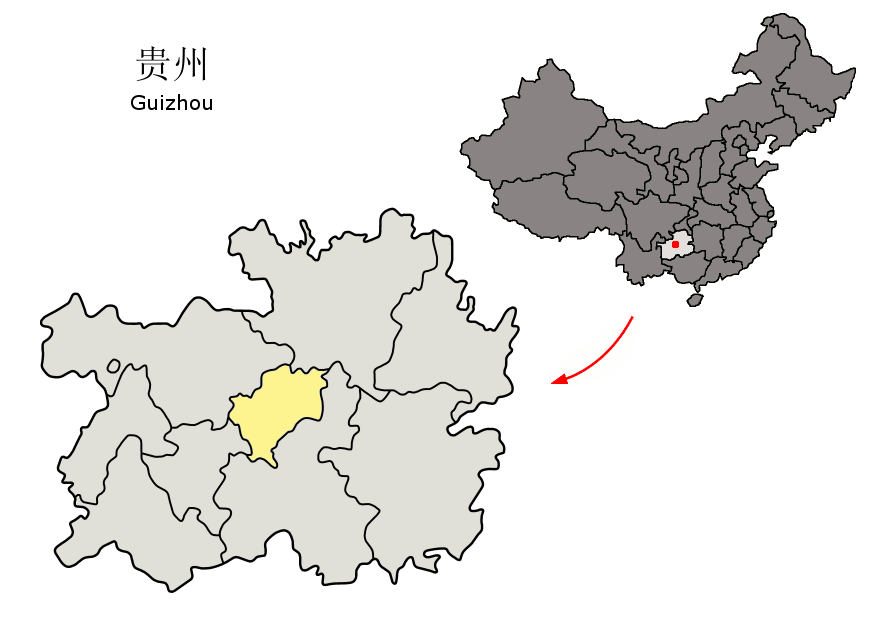
- Guiyang in Guizhou
- Coordinates (Kaiyang County government): 27°03′28″N 106°57′53″E
- Country: China
- Province: Guizhou
- Prefecture-level city: Guiyang
- County seat: Xicheng

Area
  - Total: 2,026 km^{2} (782 sq mi)

Population (2010)
  - Total: 358,130
  - Density: 176.8/km^{2} (457.8/sq mi)
- Time zone: UTC+8 (China Standard)

Kaiyang County (simplified Chinese: 开阳县; traditional Chinese: 開陽縣; pinyin: Kāiyáng Xiàn) is a county of central Guizhou province, China. It is under the administration of Guiyang City.

== Administrative divisions ==
Kaiyang County comprises 3 subdistricts, 7 towns, 5 townships and 3 ethnic townships:

Subdistricts

- Xicheng Subdistrict (Chinese: 硒城街道)
- Yunkai Subdistrict (Chinese: 云开街道)
- Zixing Subdistrict 紫兴街道

Towns

- Shuangliu Town 双流镇
- Jinzhong Town 金中镇
- Fengsan Town 冯三镇
- Nanmudu Town 楠木渡镇
- Longgang Town 龙岗镇
- Yongwen Town 永温镇
- Huali Town 花梨镇

Townships

- Nanlong Township 南龙乡
- Zhaiji Township 宅吉乡
- Longshui Township 龙水乡
- Miping Township 米坪乡
- Maoyun Township 毛云乡

Ethnic townships

- Hefeng Bouyei and Miao Ethnic Township 禾丰布依族苗族乡
- Nanjiang Bouyei and Miao Ethnic Township 南江布依族苗族乡
- Gaozhai Miao and Bouyei Ethnic Township 高寨苗族布依族乡

== Transport ==
Kaiyang railway station is the terminus of the Guiyang–Kaiyang intercity railway, opened in 2015.

== Law Enforcement ==
The Kaiyang County Public Security Bureau(Chinese: 开阳县公安局) is the primary law enforcement agency of Kaiyang county. It is a child agency of the Guiyang Municipal Public Security Bureau.

== Climate ==
Climate data for Kaiyang, elevation 1,299 m (4,262 ft), (1991–2020 normals, extremes 1981–present)
Month	Jan	Feb	Mar	Apr	May	Jun	Jul	Aug	Sep	Oct	Nov	Dec	Year
Record high °C (°F)	21.8 (71.2)	27.9 (82.2)	30.7 (87.3)	31.6 (88.9)	33.1 (91.6)	32.1 (89.8)	33.7 (92.7)	33.1 (91.6)	32.6 (90.7)	29.1 (84.4)	24.5 (76.1)	20.8 (69.4)	33.7 (92.7)
Mean daily maximum °C (°F)	5.0 (41.0)	8.2 (46.8)	12.8 (55.0)	18.3 (64.9)	21.7 (71.1)	23.8 (74.8)	26.4 (79.5)	26.5 (79.7)	23.1 (73.6)	17.4 (63.3)	13.2 (55.8)	7.4 (45.3)	17.0 (62.6)
Daily mean °C (°F)	2.3 (36.1)	4.8 (40.6)	8.7 (47.7)	14.0 (57.2)	17.6 (63.7)	20.2 (68.4)	22.4 (72.3)	22.1 (71.8)	19.0 (66.2)	14.1 (57.4)	9.8 (49.6)	4.4 (39.9)	13.3 (55.9)
Mean daily minimum °C (°F)	0.6 (33.1)	2.6 (36.7)	6.2 (43.2)	11.1 (52.0)	14.8 (58.6)	17.8 (64.0)	19.7 (67.5)	19.2 (66.6)	16.3 (61.3)	12.0 (53.6)	7.5 (45.5)	2.4 (36.3)	10.9 (51.5)
Record low °C (°F)	−7.2 (19.0)	−7.7 (18.1)	−6.2 (20.8)	0.0 (32.0)	5.2 (41.4)	10.6 (51.1)	13.1 (55.6)	13.6 (56.5)	8.8 (47.8)	2.4 (36.3)	−5.3 (22.5)	−8.0 (17.6)	−8.0 (17.6)
Average precipitation mm (inches)	40.5 (1.59)	34.2 (1.35)	60.7 (2.39)	101.2 (3.98)	164.9 (6.49)	191.6 (7.54)	187.2 (7.37)	123.3 (4.85)	110.9 (4.37)	111.9 (4.41)	53.3 (2.10)	33.6 (1.32)	1,213.3 (47.76)
Average precipitation days (≥ 0.1 mm)	18.2	16.4	19.1	18.1	18.9	18.3	14.2	13.4	12.9	17.7	14.8	15.9	197.9
Average snowy days	6.3	3.5	0.9	0	0	0	0	0	0	0	0.2	2.9	13.8
Average relative humidity (%)	89	87	86	83	82	85	81	80	81	86	84	86	84
Mean monthly sunshine hours	30.9	43.3	63.6	90.1	101.5	86.7	153.4	161.1	117.0	67.1	64.4	46.8	1,025.9
Percentage possible sunshine	9	14	17	23	24	21	36	40	32	19	20	14	22
Source: China Meteorological Administration
