= List of highest bridges =

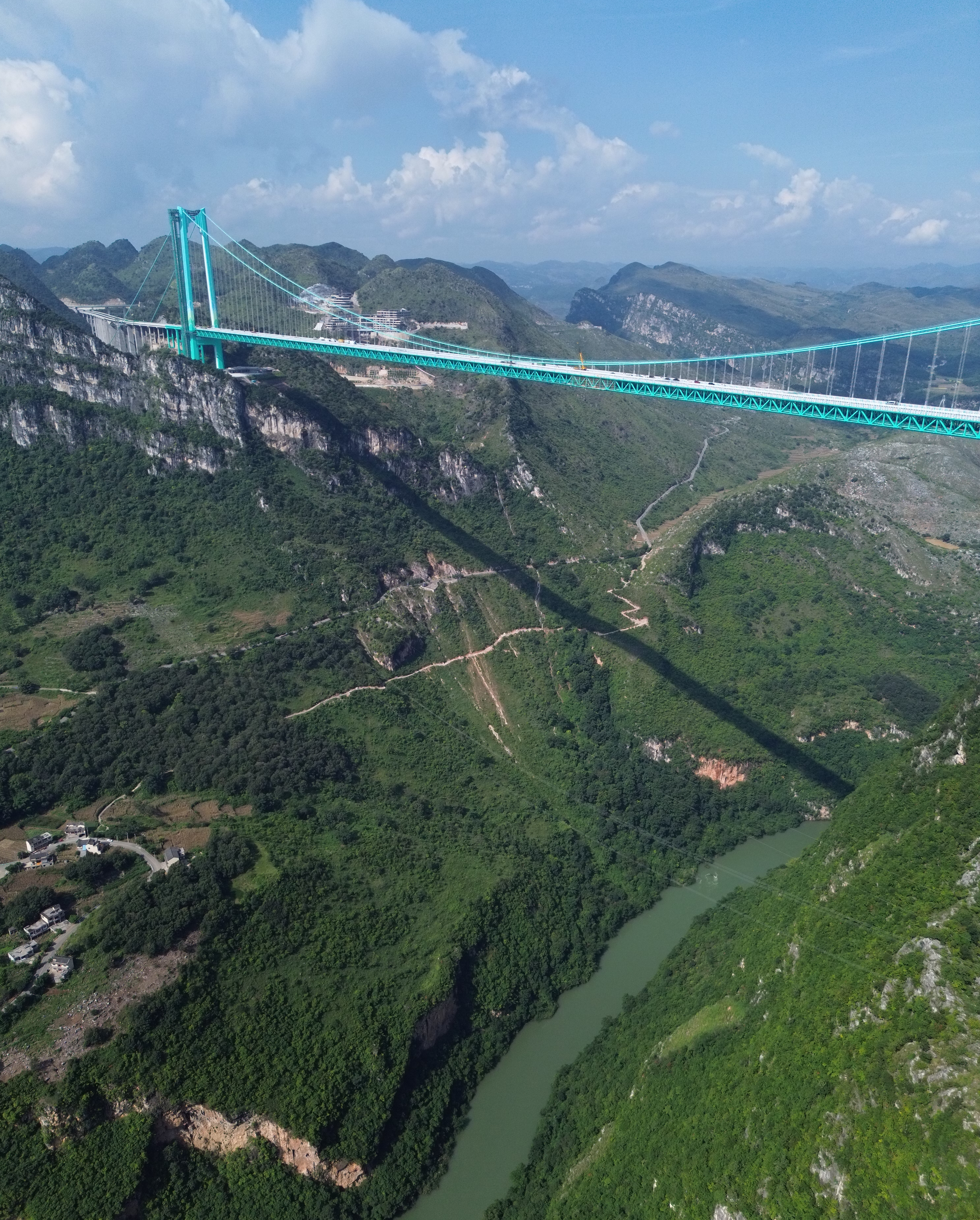
The Huajiang Canyon Bridge is the current worlds highest bridge.

This list of highest bridges includes bridges with a deck height of at least 250 metres (820 ft). The deck height of a bridge is the maximum vertical drop distance between the bridge deck (the road, rail or other transport bed of a bridge) and the ground or water surface beneath the bridge span.

Deck height is different from structural height, which is a measure of the maximum vertical distance from the uppermost part of a bridge, such as the top of a bridge tower to the lowermost exposed part of the bridge, where its piers emerge from the surface of the ground or water.

== Structural height and deck height ==
The difference between tall and high bridges can be explained in part because some of the highest bridges span the deepest part of their valley or gorge supported from above, with their ground supports built on relatively high terrain only; some of the tallest bridges have support structures on the lowest part of the valley floor.

For example, the Huajiang Canyon Bridge is the highest bridge in the world, but not the tallest. This bridge spans a deep river gorge. The bridge's two towers, built on the rims of the gorge, are 262 m (860 ft) and 205 m (673 ft) tall, but due to the depth of the river gorge between the towers, the deck height of the Huajiang Canyon Bridge is 625 m (2,051 ft).

The Millau Viaduct is a cable-stayed bridge that is both tall (in structural height) and high (in deck height). The tallest Millau Viaduct tower is situated near the valley floor, which gives the viaduct a structural height of 343 m (1,125 ft), and a deck height of 270 m (890 ft) above the valley floor.

The Changtai Yangtze River Bridge is the tallest bridge structure in the world with a height of 352 meters (1,155 ft) when it was opened in Sept. 2025.

== Completed bridges ==
The ranking of the highest bridges in the world. Only bridges with a height of 250 metres (820 ft) or greater are included. Bridges under construction are not included in this ranking, but see the separate section "Under construction" below.

Image	Name	Deck height metres (feet)	Main span metres (feet)	Opened	Carries	Design	Location	Ref.
	Huajiang Canyon Bridge	625 m (2,051 ft)	1,420 m (4,660 ft)	2025	Road; S57 Liuzhi–Anlong Expy	Suspension; Beipan River	China; Guanling County–Zhenfeng County, Guizhou; 25°42′17″N 105°35′17″E	
	Duge Bridge	565 m (1,854 ft)	720 m (2,360 ft)	2016	Road; G56 Hangzhou–Ruili Expy	Cable-stayed; Beipan River	China; Xuanwei, Yunnan–Shuicheng, Guizhou; 26°23′08″N 104°40′26″E	
	Sidu River Bridge	496 m (1,627 ft)	900 m (3,000 ft)	2009	Road; G50 Shanghai–Chongqing Expy	Suspension; Sidu River	China; Badong County, Hubei; 30°37′18″N 110°23′41″E	(Note: A dam created a reservoir below the bridge.)
	Puli Bridge	485 m (1,591 ft)	628 m (2,060 ft)	2015	Road; G56 Hangzhou–Ruili Expy	Suspension; Puli River	China; Xuanwei, Yunnan; 26°19′29″N 104°35′01″E	
	Jin'an Bridge	461 m (1,512 ft)	1,386 m (4,547 ft)	2020	Road; G4216 Chengdu–Lijiang Expy	Suspension; Jinsha River	China; Lijiang, Yunnan; 26°49′N 100°26′E	(Note: The construction of the Jinanqiao Dam downstream the bridge has reduced the height above the water.)
	Yachi River Bridge	434 m (1,424 ft)	800 m (2,600 ft)	2016	Road; S82 Guiyang–Qianxi Expy	Cable-stayed; Wu River	China; Qianxi County–Qingzhen, Guizhou; 26°50′57″N 106°08′15″E	(Note: There is a reservoir under the bridge due to the Dongfeng Dam.)
	Zangkejiang Bridge	410 m (1,350 ft)	1,080 m (3,540 ft)	2025	Road; G7612 Nayong–Xingyi Expy	Suspension; Beipan River	China; Shuicheng–Pu'an, Guizhou; 26°09′59″N 105°06′45″E	(Note: The Guangzhao Dam has reduced the height of the bridge.)
	Wujiao Pipeline Bridge	410 m (1,350 ft)	280 m (920 ft)	2018	Pipeline	Suspension	China; Leibo County, Sichuan; 28°13′55″N 103°32′33″E	
	Qingshui River Bridge	406 m (1,332 ft)	1,130 m (3,710 ft)	2015	Road; G69 Yinchuan–Baise Expy	Suspension; Qingshui River	China; Kaiyang County–Weng'an County, Guizhou; 27°01′46″N 107°11′24″E	
	Hegigio Gorge Pipeline Bridge dismantled in 2023	393 m (1,289 ft)	470 m (1,540 ft)	2005	Pipeline	Suspension; Hegigio River	Papua New Guinea; Otoma, Southern Highlands; 6°20′05″S 143°05′48″E	
	Baluarte Bridge	390 m (1,280 ft)	520 m (1,710 ft)	2013	Road; Federal Highway 40	Cable-stayed; Baluarte River	Mexico; Pueblo Nuevo, Durango; 23°32′03″N 105°45′35″W	
	Liuguanghe Xiqian Expressway Bridge	375 m (1,230 ft)	580 m (1,900 ft)	2017	Road; S30 Xifeng–Qianxi Expy	Cable-stayed; Wu River	China; Xiuwen–Qianxi, Guizhou; 27°04′41″N 106°24′06″E	
	Baling River Bridge	370 m (1,210 ft)	1,088 m (3,570 ft)	2009	Road; G60 Shanghai–Kunming Expy	Suspension; Baling River	China; Guanling County, Guizhou; 25°57′41″N 105°37′49″E	
	Beipan River Guanxing Highway Bridge	366 m (1,201 ft)	388 m (1,273 ft)	2003	Road; Guanxing Highway	Suspension; Beipan River	China; Zhenfeng County–Guanling County, Guizhou; 25°39′03″N 105°41′32″E	
	Tongzihe Bridge Jinrentong	365 m (1,198 ft)	965 m (3,166 ft)	2024	Road; S14 Xinjin Expy	Suspension; Tongzi River	China; Renhuai, Guizhou; 28°02′17″N 106°32′18″E	
	Chenab Rail Bridge	362 m (1,188 ft)	467 m (1,532 ft)	2022	Railway; Jammu–Baramulla line	Arch; Chenab River	India; Reasi, Jammu and Kashmir; 33°09′03″N 74°52′57″E	
	Maling River Bridge Fenglin	361 m (1,184 ft)	550 m (1,800 ft)	2021	Road; S09 Xingyi Ring Expy	Suspension; Maling River	China; Xingyi, Guizhou; 25°04′30″N 104°59′50″E	
	Dimuhe River Bridge	360 m (1,180 ft)	538 m (1,765 ft)	2015	Road; G56 Hangzhou–Ruili Expy	Suspension; Wu River	China; Liupanshui, Guizhou; 26°39′17″N 105°04′13″E	
	Yangbaoshan Bridge	360 m (1,180 ft)	650 m (2,130 ft)	2022	Road; S36 Guiyang–Huangping Expy	Suspension; Qingshui River	China; Guiding County, Guizhou; 26°43′34″N 107°14′15″E	
	Chuandian Jinsha River Bridge	360 m (1,180 ft)	1,060 m (3,480 ft)	2025	Road; G4216 Chengdu–Lijiang Expy	Suspension; Jinsha River	China; Ningnan County, Sichuan–Qiaojia County, Yunnan; 26°58′45″N 102°53′39″E	(Note: The Baihetan Dam formed a reservoir on the Jinsha River.)
	Yongren Bridge	352 m (1,155 ft)	920 m (3,020 ft)	2023	Road; S45 Yongren–Jinshui Expy	Suspension; Jiangdi River	China; Yongren County, Yunnan; 25°53′51″N 101°29′39″E	
	Liuchong River Bridge	340 m (1,120 ft)	438 m (1,437 ft)	2013	Road; S55 Qianxi–Zhijin Expy	Cable-stayed; Liuchong River	China; Zhijin County, Guizhou; 26°48′29″N 105°53′04″E	
	Aizhai Bridge	336 m (1,102 ft)	1,176 m (3,858 ft)	2012	Road; G65 Baotou–Maoming Expy	Suspension; Dehang Grand Canyon	China; Jishou, Hunan; 28°19′55″N 109°35′54″E	
	Lishui River Bridge	330 m (1,080 ft)	856 m (2,808 ft)	2013	Road; S10 Zhangjiajie–Huayuan Expy	Suspension; Lishui River	China; Zhangjiajie, Hunan; 29°06′56″N 110°15′32″E	
	Lvzhijiang Bridge	320 m (1,050 ft)	780 m (2,560 ft)	2022	Road; G8012 Mile–Chuxiong Expy	Suspension; Lvzhi River	China; Shuangbai County–Yimen County, Yunnan; 24°42′26″N 101°56′49″E	
	Beipan River Hukun Expressway Bridge	318 m (1,043 ft)	636 m (2,087 ft)	2009	Road; G60 Shanghai–Kunming Expy	Suspension; Beipan River	China; Qinglong County, Guizhou; 25°54′07″N 105°19′11″E	
	Nizhuhe Yunduan Glass Footbridge	317 m (1,040 ft)	365 m (1,198 ft)	2023	Footbridge	Suspension	China; Xuanwei, Yunnan; 26°26′35″N 104°38′15″E	
	Chajiaotan Bridge	315 m (1,033 ft)	1,200 m (3,900 ft)	2020	Road; S80 Gulin–Yibin Expy	Suspension; Chishui River	China; Xishui County, Guizhou–Gulin County, Sichuan; 28°09′57″N 106°08′07″E	
	Gujin Chishui River Bridge	315 m (1,033 ft)	575 m (1,886 ft)	2024	Road; G7512 Guiyang–Chengdu Expy	Cable-stayed; Chishui River	China; Gulin County, Sichuan–Jinsha County, Guizhou; 27°45′11″N 105°58′56″E	
	Liuzhi Bridge	315 m (1,033 ft)	320 m (1,050 ft)	2025	Road; G7612 Nayong–Xingyi Expy	Beam	China; Liuzhi Special District, Guizhou; 26°13′07″N 105°17′22″E	
	Tianyundu Glass Footbridge	312 m (1,024 ft)	454 m (1,490 ft)	2020	Footbridge	Suspension	China; Yangshan County, Guangdong; 24°39′50″N 112°45′55″E	
	Loushuihe Bridge	310 m (1,020 ft)	310 m (1,020 ft)	2024	Road; S64 Yidu–Laifeng Expy	Arch; Loushui River	China; Hefeng County, Hubei; 29°52′20″N 110°01′34″E	
	Najiehe Railway Bridge	310 m (1,020 ft)	352 m (1,155 ft)	2016	Railway; Zhijin-Qingzhen Railway	Arch; Wu River	China; Zhijin County–Qingzhen, Guizhou; 26°42′06″N 106°09′46″E	
	Pingtang Bridge	305 m (1,001 ft)	550 m (1,800 ft)	2019	Road; S62 Yuqing–Anlong Expy	Cable-stayed; Caodu River	China; Pingtang County, Guizhou; 25°47′07″N 107°03′24″E	
	Wumengshan Bridge	305 m (1,001 ft)	270 m (890 ft)	2025	Road; G7612 Nayong–Xingyi Expy	Arch; Azhi River	China; Changliuxiang, Guizhou; 26°12′55″N 105°11′46″E	
	Kaizhou Lake Bridge	305 m (1,001 ft)	1,100 m (3,600 ft)	2021	Road; S30 Weng'an–Kaiyang Expy	Suspension; Qingshui River	China; Kaiyang County, Guizhou; 27°11′59″N 107°05′14″E	(Note: The Goupitan Dam formed a reservoir on the Wu River and the Qingshui River.)
	Zunyu Expressway Xiang River Bridge	304 m (997 ft)	560 m (1,840 ft)	2021	Road; S34 Yuqing–Zunyi Expy	Cable-stayed; Xiang River	China; Bozhou–Weng'an County, Guizhou; 27°26′52″N 107°15′52″E	
	Shuangbao Grand Bridge	301 m (988 ft)	405 m (1,329 ft)	2024	Road; S3 Yuxiang Double Line	Arch; Dadong River; Xiaodong River	China; Wulong, Chongqing; 29°17′42″N 107°28′26″E	
	Wujiang Bridge Jinfeng	300 m (980 ft)	650 m (2,130 ft)	2023	Road; G7512 Guiyang–Chengdu Expy	Suspension; Wu River	China; Huajuexiang, Guizhou; 27°11′50″N 106°28′16″E	
	Baishuijiang Bridge	300 m (980 ft)	330 m (1,080 ft)	2023	Road; S14 Yizhao Expy	Arch; Baishui River	China; Yiliang County, Yunnan; 27°48′14″N 104°31′27″E	
	Liuguanghe Bridge	297 m (974 ft)	240 m (790 ft)	2001	Road; G321 Guiyang–Bijie Highway	Beam; Wu River	China; Liu Guangzhen, Guizhou; 26°59′23″N 106°24′25″E	
	Feilonghu Wujiang Bridge	297 m (974 ft)	680 m (2,230 ft)	2021	Road; S34 Yuqing–Zunyi Expy	Suspension; Wu River	China; Shilianzhen, Guizhou; 27°23′50″N 107°27′10″E	
	Heshandu Wujiang Bridge	297 m (974 ft)	680 m (2,230 ft)	2021	Road; S32 Meitan–Shiqian Expy	Suspension; Wu River	China; Benzhuangzhen, Guizhou; 27°34′1″N 107°53′49″E	
	Qinglong Railway Bridge	295 m (968 ft)	445 m (1,460 ft)	2016	Railway; Shanghai–Kunming High-Speed Railway	Arch; Beipan River	China; Qinglong County–Guanling County, Guizhou; 25°57′02″N 105°15′18″E	
	Zhijing River Bridge	294 m (965 ft)	430 m (1,410 ft)	2009	Road; G50 Shanghai–Chongqing Expy	Arch; Zhijing River	China; Badong County, Hubei; 30°37′36″N 110°11′48″E	
	Royal Gorge Bridge	291 m (955 ft)	286 m (938 ft)	1929	Road; Fremont County Road 3A	Suspension; Arkansas River	USA; Cañon City, Colorado; 38°27′43″N 105°19′30″W	
	Tian'e Longtan Bridge	290 m (950 ft)	600 m (2,000 ft)	2024	Road; S26 Nandan–Tian'e Expy	Arch; Hongshui River	China; Tian'e County, Guangxi; 25°04′41″N 107°01′16″E	
	Dongxihe Bridge	289 m (948 ft)	330 m (1,080 ft)	2024	Road; G6911 Ankang–Laifeng Expy	Arch; Daning River	China; Wuxi County, Chongqing; 31°39′55″N 109°35′10″E	
	Xixihe Bridge Qianda	288 m (945 ft)	190 m (620 ft)	2015	Road; S82 Qianxi–Dafang Expy	Beam; Xixi River	China; Dafang County, Guizhou; 27°6′9″N 105°48′56″E	
	Longli Bridge	288 m (945 ft)	528 m (1,732 ft)	2024	Road	Cable-stayed	China; Longli County, Guizhou; 26°23′09″N 106°50′59″E	
	Nanmengxi Bridge	287 m (942 ft)	360 m (1,180 ft)	2024	Road; S72 Jianhe–Liping Expy	Cable-stayed; Qingshui River (Yuan River)	China; Jinping County, Guizhou; 26°33′27″N 108°51′8″E	
	Xingkang Bridge	285 m (935 ft)	1,100 m (3,600 ft)	2018	Road; G4218 Ya'an–Kargilik Expy	Suspension; Dadu River	China; Luding County, Sichuan; 29°57′57″N 102°12′53″E	
	Longjiang Bridge	280 m (920 ft)	1,196 m (3,924 ft)	2016	Road; S10 Baoteng Expy	Suspension; Long River	China; Baoshan, Yunnan; 24°50′19″N 98°40′19″E	
	Sunxi River Bridge	280 m (920 ft)	660 m (2,170 ft)	2018	Road; S49 Jiangjin–Xishui Expy	Suspension; Sunxi River	China; Bailinzhen, Chongqing; 28°42′46″N 106°27′42″E	
	Lianghekou Dam Bridge	280 m (920 ft)	220 m (720 ft)	2019	Road	Beam; Yalong River	China; Yajiang County, Sichuan; 30°12′31″N 100°58′58″E	
	Dafaqu Bridge	280 m (920 ft)	410 m (1,350 ft)	2022	Road; G4215 Chengdu–Zunyi Expy	Arch	China; Bozhou–Huichuan, Guizhou; 27°47′51″N 106°34′0″E	
	Liutonghe Bridge	280 m (920 ft)	300 m (980 ft)	2025	Road; G4216 Chengdu–Lijiang Expy	Arch; Liutong River	China; Leibo County, Sichuan; 28°3′4″N 103°25′1″E	(Note: The Xiluodu Dam domwnstream has increased the height of the Jinsha River.)
	Millau Viaduct	277 m (909 ft)	342 m (1,122 ft)	2004	Road; A75 autoroute	Cable-stayed; Tarn	France; Millau, Aveyron; 44°04′49″N 3°01′21″E	
	Beipan River Shuibai Railway Bridge	275 m (902 ft)	236 m (774 ft)	2001	Railway; Liupanshui–Baiguo railway	Arch; Beipan River	China; Shuicheng, Guizhou; 26°12′36″N 104°43′14″E	
	Baishuihe Bridge	275 m (902 ft)	340 m (1,120 ft)	2024	Road; G7612 Nayong–Xingyi Expy	Arch	China; Zhijin County, Guizhou; 26°33′39″N 105°26′7″E	
	Yachi Railway Bridge	272 m (892 ft)	436 m (1,430 ft)	2019	Railway; Chengdu–Guangzhou High-Speed Railway	Arch; Wu River	China; Qianxi County, Guizhou; 26°53′04″N 106°17′25″E	
	Mike O'Callaghan–Pat Tillman Memorial Bridge	271 m (889 ft)	323 m (1,060 ft)	2010	Road; U.S. Route 93	Arch; Colorado River	USA; Boulder City, Nevada–Mohave County, Arizona; 36°00′45″N 114°44′29″W	
	Lancang River Railway Bridge	271 m (889 ft)	342 m (1,122 ft)	2022	Railway; Dali–Ruili Railway	Arch; Mekong	China; Yongping County–Longyang, Yunnan; 25°17′23″N 99°20′57″E	(Note: The Xiaowan Dam has created a reservoir which extends under the bridge and the full height is not visible.)
	New River Gorge Bridge	267 m (876 ft)	518 m (1,699 ft)	1977	Road; U.S. Route 19	Arch; New River	USA; Fayetteville, West Virginia; 38°04′08″N 81°04′57″W	
	Wujiang Bridge Mozhai	265 m (869 ft)	296 m (971 ft)	2024	Road; S3 Yuxiang Double Line	Extradossed; Wu River	China; Pengshui County, Chongqing; 29°13′46″N 108°10′23″E	
	Zongxihe Bridge	264 m (866 ft)	360 m (1,180 ft)	2015	Road; G76 Xiamen–Chengdu Expy	Arch; Liuchong River	China; Nayong County, Guizhou; 27°01′23″N 105°14′30″E	
	Wulingshan Bridge	263 m (863 ft)	360 m (1,180 ft)	2009	Road; G65 Baotou–Maoming Expy	Cable-stayed; Houzao River	China; Pengshui County, Chongqing; 29°30′02″N 108°30′03″E	
	Nanpan River Qiubei Bridge	262 m (860 ft)	416 m (1,365 ft)	2016	Railway; Nanning–Kunming High-Speed Railway	Arch; Nanpan River	China; Qiubei County, Yunnan; 24°06′43″N 103°35′07″E	
	Gongshuihe Bridge	260 m (850 ft)	400 m (1,300 ft)	2015	Road; G6911 Ankang–Laifeng Expy	Cable-stayed; Niucao River	China; Xuan'en County, Hubei; 29°56′45″N 109°25′21″E	
	Zhangjiajie Glass Bridge	260 m (850 ft)	430 m (1,410 ft)	2016	Footbridge	Suspension	China; Zhangjiajie, Hunan; 29°24′N 110°42′E	
	Wujiang Bridge Yuqing	260 m (850 ft)	360 m (1,180 ft)	2016	Road; G69 Yinchuan–Baise Expy	Cable-stayed; Wu River	China; Goupitanzhen, Guizhou; 27°26′30″N 107°31′42″E	
	Jinshajiang Bridge Hutiaoxia	260 m (850 ft)	766 m (2,513 ft)	2020	Road; G0613 Xining–Lijiang Expy	Suspension; Jinsha River	China; Shangri-La County–Yulong County, Yunnan; 27°10′25″N 100°5′4″E	
	Italia Viaduct	259 m (850 ft)	175 m (574 ft)	1974	Road; Autostrada A2	Beam; Lao River	Italy; Laino Borgo, Calabria; 39°56′21″N 15°57′33″E	
	Jiangjiehe Bridge	256 m (840 ft)	330 m (1,080 ft)	1995	Road; S205 Provincial Road	Arch; Wu River	China; Weng'an County, Guizhou; 27°17′56″N 107°22′18″E	
	Xixihe Railway Bridge	256 m (840 ft)	240 m (790 ft)	2019	Railway; Chengdu–Guangzhou High-Speed Railway	Arch; Xixi River	China; Dafang County, Guizhou; 27°6′58″N 105°49′0″E	
	Qingjiang Bridge Shuibuya	255 m (837 ft)	420 m (1,380 ft)	2018	Road; S245 Provincial Road	Suspension; Qing River	China; Shuibuya, Hubei; 30°26′1″N 110°19′11″E	
	Sanxia Lianxin Bridge	255 m (837 ft)	200 m (660 ft)	2021	Road	Beam; Jinyang River	China; Jinyang County, Sichuan; 27°42′22″N 103°15′31″E	
	Yangshuihe Bridge	254 m (833 ft)	230 m (750 ft)	2017	Road; S30 Xifeng–Qianxi Expy	Beam; Yangshui River	China; Xifeng County, Guizhou; 27°12′0″N 106°52′4″E	
	Sfalassa Viaduct	250 m (820 ft)	376 m (1,234 ft)	1973	Road; Autostrada A2	Beam; Sfalassà Gorge	Italy; Bagnara Calabra, Calabria; 38°16′17″N 15°48′12″E	
	Mengdonghe Bridge Yongji	250 m (820 ft)	268 m (879 ft)	2017	Road; S99 Longshan–Jishou Expy	Arch; Mengdong River	China; Yongshun County, Hunan; 28°48′11″N 109°53′38″E	
	Hutiaoxia Jinsha River Railway Bridge	250 m (820 ft)	660 m (2,170 ft)	2021	Railway; Lijiang–Shangri-La railway	Suspension; Jinsha River	China; Shangri-La County–Yulong County, Yunnan; 27°10′30″N 100°5′25″E	
	Ganxi Bridge	250 m (820 ft)	300 m (980 ft)	2022	Road	Beam; Qingshui River	China; Guiding County, Guizhou; 26°41′58″N 107°13′28″E	
	Shuiluohe Bridge	250 m (820 ft)	335 m (1,099 ft)	2024	Road; G7512 Guiyang–Chengdu Expy	Arch; Shuiluo River	China; Gulin County, Sichuan; 27°59′56″N 105°55′33″E	

== Under construction ==
The list below includes the highest bridges in the world currently under construction. Only bridges with a height of 250 metres (660 ft) or greater are included.

Image	Name	Deck height metres (feet)	Main span metres (feet)	Expected opening	Carries	Design	Location	Ref.
	Yongchang Lancang River Bridge	610 m (2,000 ft)	1,416 m (4,646 ft)	2028	Road; Yongping-Changning Expy	Suspension; Mekong	China; Changning County, Yunnan; 24°53′30″N 99°44′39″E	
	Tianmen Bridge	560 m (1,840 ft)	820 m (2,690 ft)	2026	Road; Anshun–Panzhou Expy	Suspension; Beipan River	China; Shuicheng, Guizhou; 26°09′36″N 104°57′52″E	
	Lugu Lake Bridge	493 m (1,617 ft)	1,680 m (5,510 ft)	2026	Road; G7611 Duyun–Shangri-La Expy	Suspension; Woluo River	China; Yanyuan County, Sichuan; 27°40′26″N 101°07′52″E	
	Yalong Liangshan Bridge	480 m (1,570 ft)	1,200 m (3,900 ft)	2026	Road; G7611 Duyun–Shangri-La Expy	Suspension; Yalong River	China; Yanyuan County, Sichuan; 27°42′32″N 102°00′01″E	
	Puzhehei Bridge	475 m (1,558 ft)	930 m (3,050 ft)	2028	Road; Luqiuguangfu Expy	Cable-stayed; Nanpan River	China; Luxi County–Qiubei County, Yunnan; 24°16′52″N 103°48′54″E	
	Guniuhe Bridge	405 m (1,329 ft)	520 m (1,710 ft)	2026	Road; Anshun–Panzhou Expy	Arch; Guniu River	China; Shuicheng, Guizhou; 26°11′37″N 105°02′37″E	
	Liuchehe Bridge	400 m (1,300 ft)	264 m (866 ft)	2026	Road; Anshun–Panzhou Expy	Arch; Liuche River	China; Shuicheng, Guizhou; 26°5′39″N 104°53′5″E	
	Sichuan-Tibet Railway Dadu River Bridge	380 m (1,250 ft)	1,060 m (3,480 ft)	2028	Railway; Sichuan–Tibet railway	Suspension; Dadu River	China; Luding County, Sichuan; 29°55′50″N 102°13′45″E	
	Yanjin Guanhe Bridge	350 m (1,150 ft)	880 m (2,890 ft)	2028	Road; Yongshan–Yanjin Expy	Suspension; Heng River	China; Yanjin County, Yunnan; 28°5′7″N 104°14′21″E	
	Fenglai Bridge	310 m (1,020 ft)	580 m (1,900 ft)	2026	Road; Wuliang Expy	Arch; Daxi River	China; Wulong District, Chongqing; 29°23′26″N 107°17′29″E	
	Jiangjiehe Railway Bridge	298 m (978 ft)	337 m (1,106 ft)	2026	Railway; Wengma railway	Arch; Wu River	China; Weng'an County, Guizhou; 27°18′5″N 107°22′23″E	
	Chaibuxi Bridge	290 m (950 ft)	480 m (1,570 ft)	2026	Road; S64 Yilai Expy	Cable-stayed; Chaibuxi River	China; Wufeng County, Hubei; 30°10′25″N 111°1′43″E	
	Guangming Niulanjiang Bridge	290 m (950 ft)	370 m (1,210 ft)	2026	Road; Luqiao Expy	Cable-stayed; Niulan River	China; Ludian County–Qiaojia County, Yunnan; 27°3′11″N 103°22′42″E	
	Wushan Shennv Yangtze River Bridge	283 m (928 ft)	898 m (2,946 ft)	2028	Road; Wuguan Expy	Cable-stayed; Yangtze	China; Wushan County, Chongqing; 31°3′29″N 109°51′25″E	(Note: The Three Gorges Dam Reservoir has increased the height of the water below the bridge and the full height is no longer visible.)
	Kahaluo Jinsha River Bridge	276 m (906 ft)	1,030 m (3,380 ft)	2025	Road; S14 Dayong Expy	Suspension; Jinsha River	China; Leibo County, Sichuan–Yongshan County, Yunnan; 27°58′13″N 103°30′42″E	
	Nanjinguan Yangtze River Bridge	270 m (890 ft)	1,200 m (3,900 ft)	2028	Road; Yichang West Ring Expy	Suspension; Yangtze	China; Yichang, Hubei; 30°46′1″N 111°15′10″E	(Note: The Gezhouba Dam has created a reservoir on the Yangtze River.)
	Daxi River Bridge	270 m (890 ft)	650 m (2,130 ft)	2026	Road; G6911 Ankang–Laifeng Expy	Cable-stayed	China; Fengjie County, Chongqing; 30°59′9″N 109°36′6″E	
	Malutang Bridge	267 m (876 ft)	480 m (1,570 ft)	2026	Road; Malipo Expy	Cable-stayed; Nanwen River	China; Malipo County, Yunnan; 23°0′3″N 104°41′43″E	
	Jinqi Bridge	258 m (846 ft)	320 m (1,050 ft)	2026	Road; Wuchang Expy	Cable-stayed; Maotiao River	China; Qingzhen–Xiuwen County, Guizhou; 26°49′10″N 106°26′19″E	
	Lixianjiang Bridge	250 m (820 ft)	420 m (1,380 ft)	2026	Road; Menglv Expy	Cable-stayed; Lixian River	China; Jiangcheng County–Lüchun County, Yunnan; 22°47′24″N 101°59′39″E	

== Timeline ==
The list below shows the historical progression of the highest bridge in the world.

Name	Record	Location	Height	Main span	Year opened	Carries
Huajiang Canyon Bridge	2025–present	(China) near Beipanjiang in Guizhou	625 m (2,051 ft)	1,420 m (4,660 ft)	2025	S57
Duge Bridge	2016–2025	(China) near Liupanshui in Guizhou	564 m (1,850 ft)	720 m (2,360 ft)	2016	G56
Sidu River Bridge	2009–2016	(China) Yesanguanzhen	496 m (1,627 ft)	900 m (2,953 ft)	2009	G50
Hegigio Gorge Pipeline Bridge	2005–2009	Otoma, Papua New Guinea	393 m (1,289 ft)	470 m (1,542 ft)	2005	pipeline
Beipan River Guanxing Highway Bridge	2003–2005	(China) Xingbeizhen	366 m (1,201 ft)	388 m (1,273 ft)	2003	highway
Liuguanghe Bridge	2001–2003	(China) Liu Guangzhen	297 m (974 ft)	240 m (787 ft)	2001	G321
Royal Gorge Bridge	1929–2001	(United States) Cañon City, Colorado	291 m (955 ft)	286 m (938 ft)	1929	road
Niouc Bridge	1922–1929	(Switzerland) Niouc	190 m (623 ft)	190 m (623 ft)	1922	pipeline
Sidi M'Cid Bridge	1912–1922	Constantine, Algeria	175 m (574 ft)	160 m (525 ft)	1912	road
Pont de la Caille	1839–1912	(France) Allonzier-la-Caille	147 m (482 ft)	183 m (600 ft)	1839	pedestrian
Puente Nuevo	1751–1839	(Spain) Ronda	120 m (394 ft)	100 m (328 ft)	1793	road
Ponte delle Torri	14th century–1751	(Italy) Spoleto	80 m (262 ft)		14th century	Aqueduct
Alcántara Bridge	106–14th century	(Spain) Alcántara	48 m (157 ft)	29 m (95 ft)	106	Roman bridge
Pont d'Aël	3 BC – 106 AD	(Italy) Aymavilles	66 m (217 ft)	14 m (46 ft)	3 BC	Roman aqueduct

== See also ==
- List of tallest bridges
- List of longest suspension bridge spans
- List of longest cable-stayed bridge spans
- List of longest arch bridge spans
