= Gujin Chishui River Bridge =

Bridge in southwestern China

Gujin Chishui River Bridge 古金赤水河大桥
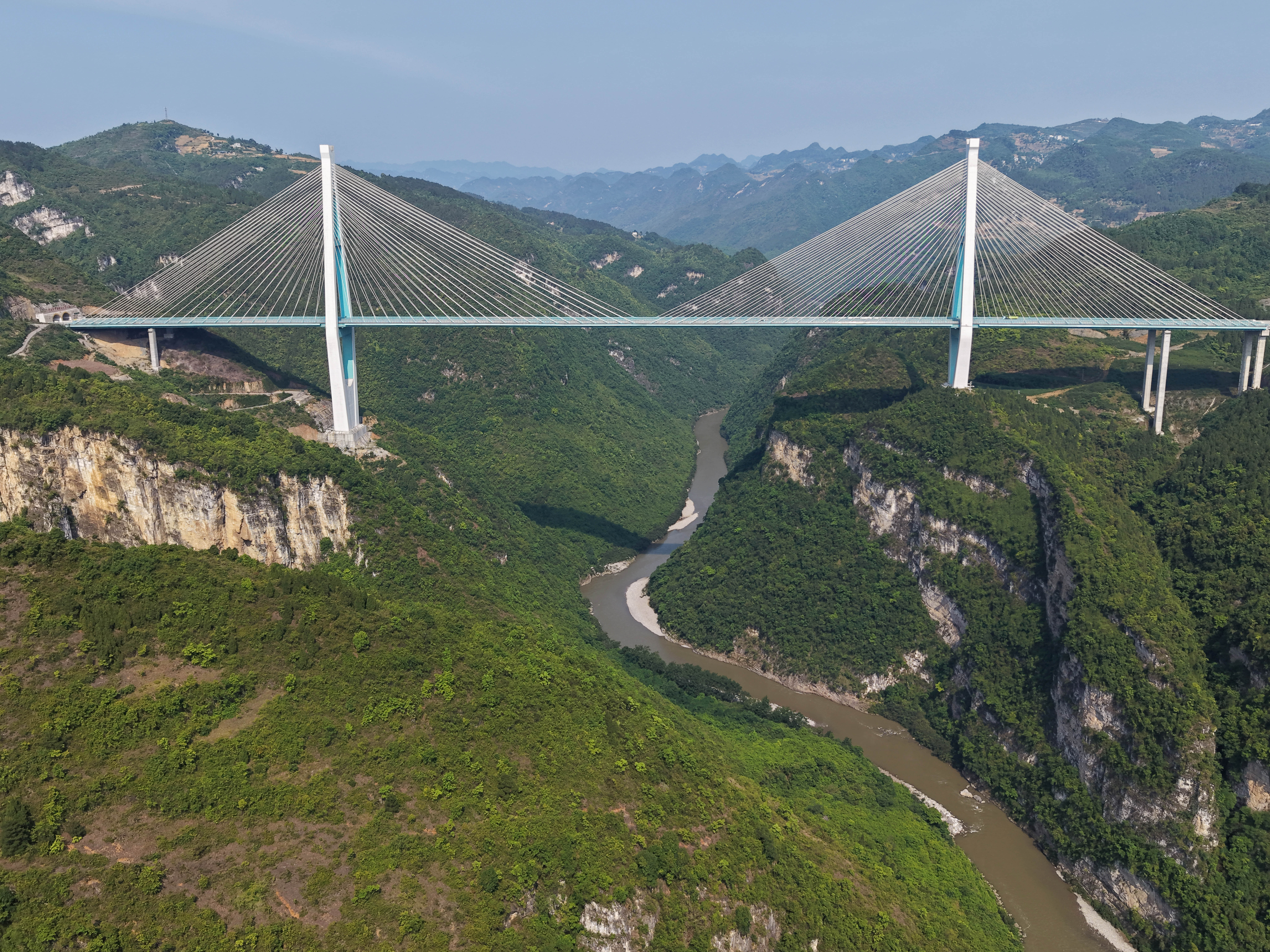
- Coordinates: 27°45′11.2″N 105°58′56.0″E
- Carries: G7512 Guiyang–Chengdu Expy
- Crosses: Chishui River
- Locale: Gulin County, Sichuan–Jinsha County, Guizhou

Characteristics
- Design: Cable-stayed bridge
- Total length: 1,089 metres (3,573 ft)
- Width: 38 metres (125 ft)
- Height: north tower 261 metres (856 ft) south tower 217 metres (712 ft)
- Longest span: 575 metres (1,886 ft)
- Clearance below: 315 metres (1,033 ft)
- No. of lanes: 6

History
- Construction start: 2020
- Opened: 29 December 2023

Location
- Interactive map of Gujin Chishui River Bridge

The Gujin Chishui River Bridge (Chinese: 古金赤水河大桥) is a bridge between Gulin County, Sichuan and Jinsha County, Guizhou, China. With a height of 261 metres (856 ft), the north tower is one of the tallest bridge structure in the world, it is also one of the highest bridge in the world with a deck 315 metres (1,033 ft) above the river. It was opened to traffic on 29 December 2023.

== See also ==
- List of highest bridges
- List of tallest bridges
- List of longest cable-stayed bridge spans
