= Chajiaotan Bridge =

Chishui River Hongjun Bridge 赤水河红军大桥
- Coordinates: 28°09′57″N 106°08′07″E
- Carries: S80 Gulin–Yibin Expy
- Crosses: Chishui River
- Locale: Xishui County, Guizhou–Gulin County, Sichuan, China

Characteristics
- Design: Suspension
- Material: Steel
- Total length: 2,009 m (6,591 ft)
- Width: 27 m (89 ft)
- Height: 243.5 m (799 ft)
- Longest span: 1,200 m (3,900 ft)
- Clearance above: 315 m (1,033 ft)

History
- Construction start: 2014
- Construction end: 2019-9-28
- Opened: 2020-01-01

Location
- Interactive map of Chishui River Hongjun Bridge

The Chishui River Hongjun Bridge is a suspension bridge between Xishui County in Guizhou and Gulin County in Sichuan, China, it is part of the S80 Gulin–Yibin Expressway and carrying traffic over the Chishui River. It is one of the highest bridges in the world at 315 m (1,033 ft).

Construction began in 2014 and the bridge opened in 2020. The main span of the bridge is 1,200 m (3,900 ft) making it one of the longest ever built. Other high bridges on the Sichuan section of the Xugu expressway include Shilianghe, Luosizhai, Tiantanghe, Modaoxi and two crossings of the Gulin River.

Chishui River Hongjun Bridge is the last link along the 84-kilometre (52 mi) Xugu expressway that connects the city of Xuyong on the G76 with the city of Gulin and eventually the Chishui River gorge where it will connect with the Renchi expressway in Guizhou. The bridge construction was completed in 2019. Work was expected to start in 2017 on the second phase of the expressway including the Bridge in addition to 12 kilometres (7.5 mi) of expressway in Guizhou Province. The suspension span configuration will be 325–1,200–205 metres (1,066–3,937–673 ft) with a total length of 2,009 metres (6,591 ft) and a width of 27 metres (89 ft). Some sources have a height of 350 metres (1,150 ft) but it is not clear if this is to the river surface or the bottom of the river.

== See also ==
- List of bridges in China
- List of highest bridges
- List of tallest bridges
- List of longest suspension bridge spans
