= Zhanghua Lishui Grand Bridge =

Suspension bridge near Zhangjiajie, China

Zhanghua Lishui Grand Bridge 张花澧水大桥
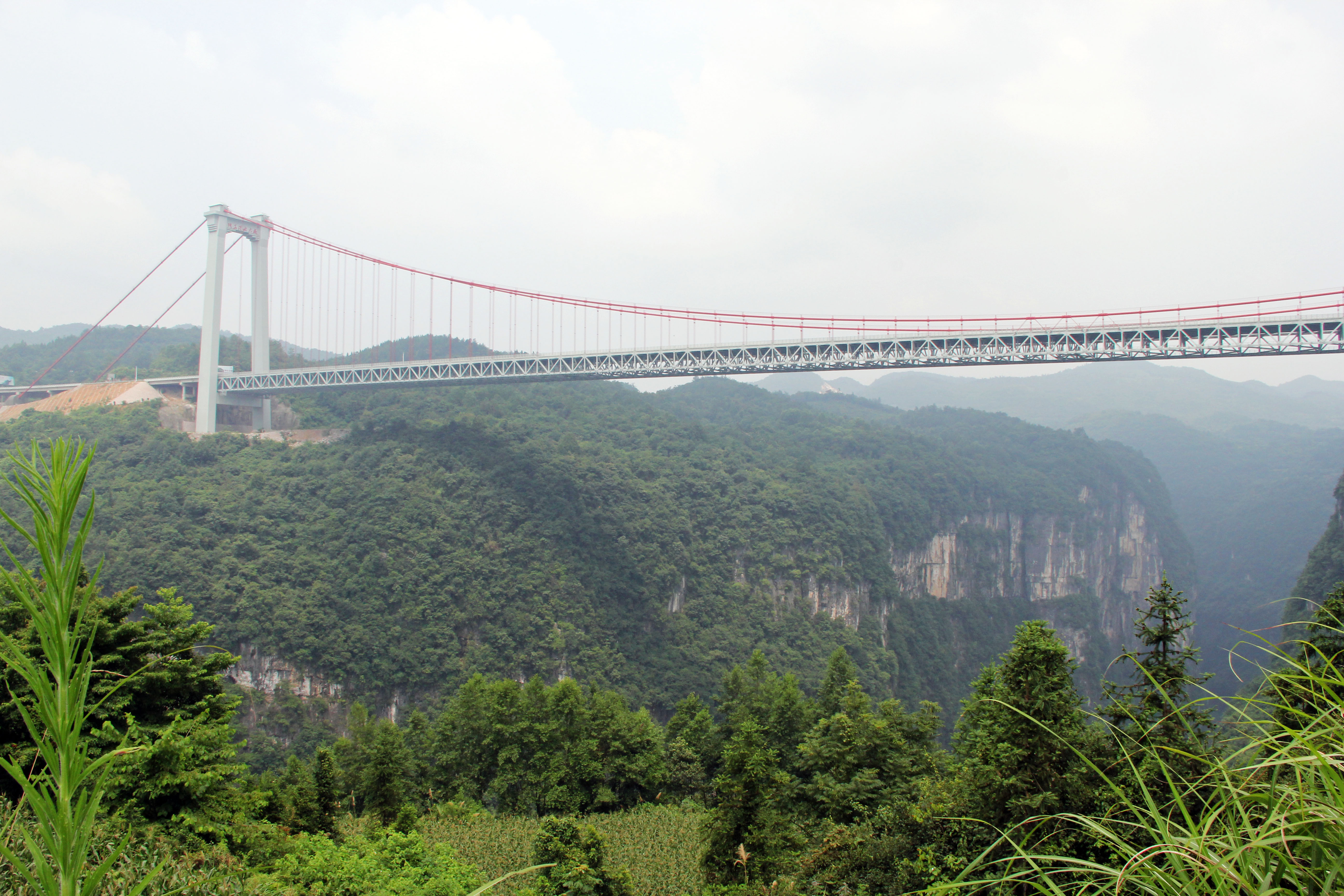
- Coordinates: 29.112°N 110.262°E
- Carries: G5513 Changsha–Zhangjiajie Expressway
- Crosses: Lishui River
- Locale: Zhangjiajie, Hunan, China

Characteristics
- Design: Suspension
- Material: Steel
- Total length: 1,194 m (3,917 ft)
- Width: 24.5 m (80 ft)
- Longest span: 856 m (2,808 ft)
- Clearance below: 330 m (1,080 ft)

History
- Construction start: c. 2009-10
- Opened: December 2, 2013

Location
- Interactive map of Zhanghua Lishui Grand Bridge

The Zhanghua Lishui Grand Bridge (张花澧水大桥) is a suspension bridge in Zhangjiajie, Hunan Province, China. The bridge spans 856 m (2,808 ft) over the Lishui River gorge between the Yongding District, Zhangjiajie and the Yongshun County, Xiangxi. The bridge is part of an extension of the G5513 Changsha–Zhangjiajie Expressway to Huayuan that cut the 8 hour travel time between Zhangjiajie and Chongqing in half. With 330 m (1,080 ft) of clearance above the river the bridge is one of the world's highest bridges.

== Construction ==
Construction of the bridge began around 2009/2010. An innovative technique was used to carry the pilot line across the gorge by rocket in early 2011. This technique was first used on the nearby Sidu River Bridge. On July 11, 2012, the final truss section was connected completing the main structure of the bridge. The bridge and associated expressway were opened in December 2013.

== Tourism ==
A rest stop and viewing area was built at the eastern end of the bridge. It provides panoramic views of the bridge and the Lishui River Gorge below.

== See also ==
- List of longest suspension bridge spans
- List of highest bridges in the world
- List of largest bridges in China
