= Gongshuihe Bridge =

Gongshui River Bridge 贡水河大桥
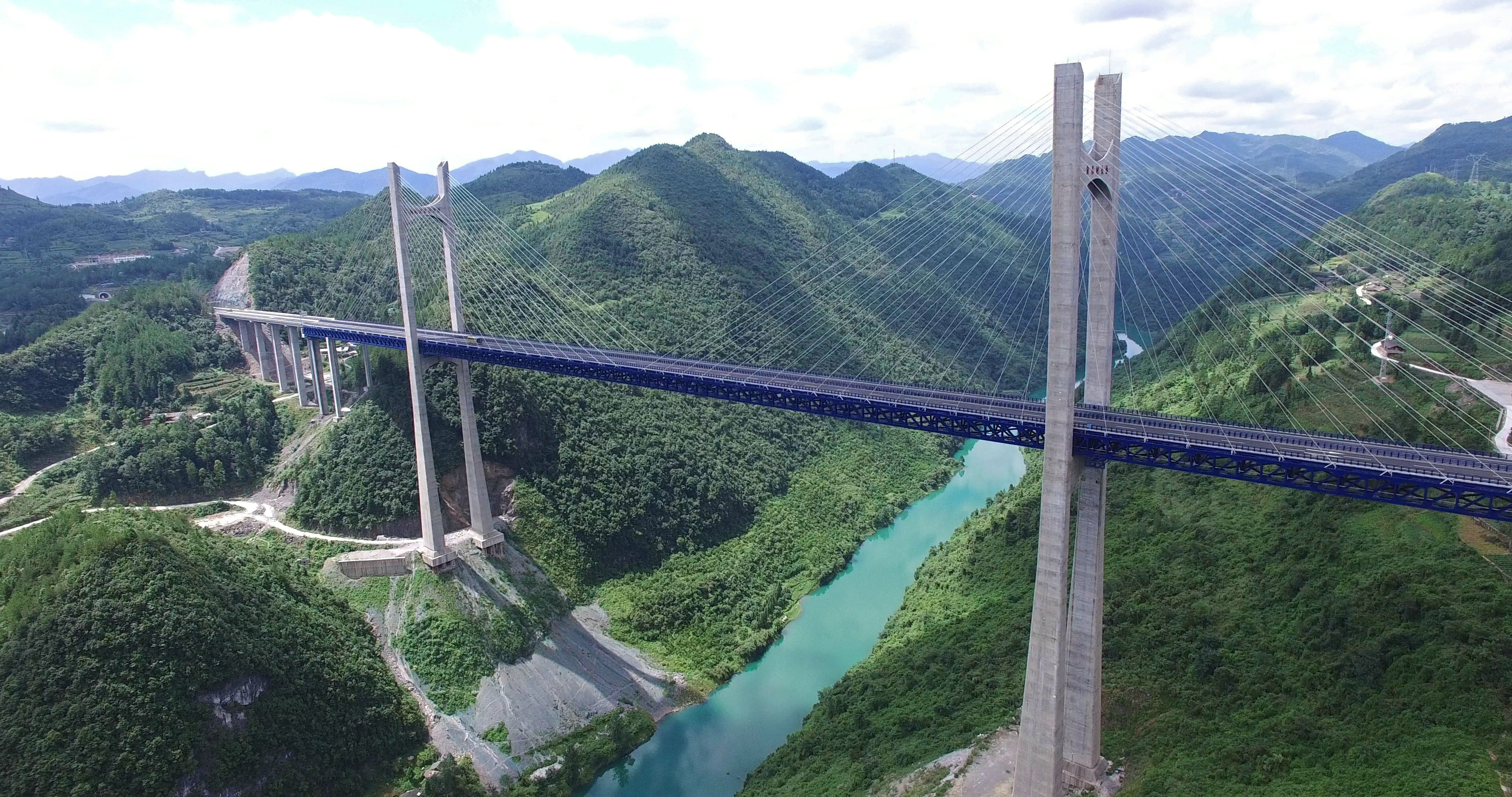
- Coordinates: 29°56′35″N 109°25′41″E
- Carries: G6911 Ankang–Laifeng Expressway
- Crosses: Niucao River
- Locale: Xuan'en County, Hubei

Characteristics
- Design: Cable-stayed bridge
- Total length: 1,063 metres (3,488 ft)
- Width: 26.9 metres (88 ft)
- Height: 245 metres (804 ft)
- Longest span: 400 metres (1,300 ft)
- Clearance below: 260 metres (850 ft)
- No. of lanes: 4

History
- Construction start: 22 August 2011
- Opened: 26 December 2014

Location
- Interactive map of Gongshui River Bridge

The Gongshui River Bridge (Chinese: 贡水河大桥), previously called Zhongjian River Bridge (Chinese: 忠建河大桥), is a bridge in Xuan'en County, Hubei, China. With a height of 245 metres (804 ft), the towers are among of the tallest bridge structure in the world, it is also one of the highest bridge in the world with a deck 260 metres (850 ft) above the river. It was opened to traffic on 26 December 2014.

== See also ==
- List of highest bridges
- List of tallest bridges
- List of longest cable-stayed bridge spans
