= Daxi River Bridge =

Bridge in southwestern China

Daxi River Bridge 大溪河特大桥
- Coordinates: 30°59′9″N 109°36′6″E
- Carries: G6911 Ankang–Laifeng Expressway
- Crosses: Daxi River
- Locale: Fengjie County, Chongqing

Characteristics
- Design: Cable-stayed bridge
- Width: 27.6 metres (91 ft)
- Height: north tower 312.4 metres (1,025 ft) south tower 296.4 metres (972 ft)
- Longest span: 650 metres (2,130 ft)
- Clearance below: 270 metres (890 ft)

Location
- Interactive map of Daxi River Bridge

The Daxi River Bridge (Chinese: 大溪河特大桥) is a bridge in Fengjie County, Chongqing, China, located approximately 2.8 kilometres (1.7 mi) from the confluence of the Daxi River and the Yangtze River at the eastern entrance of the Qutang Gorge.

With a height of 312.4 metres (1,025 ft), the north tower is one of the tallest bridge structure in the world, it is also one of the highest bridge in the world with a deck 270 metres (890 ft) above the river.

== See also ==
- List of highest bridges
- List of tallest bridges
- List of longest cable-stayed bridge spans
