= Zangkejiang Bridge =

Zangkejiang Bridge 牂牁江大桥
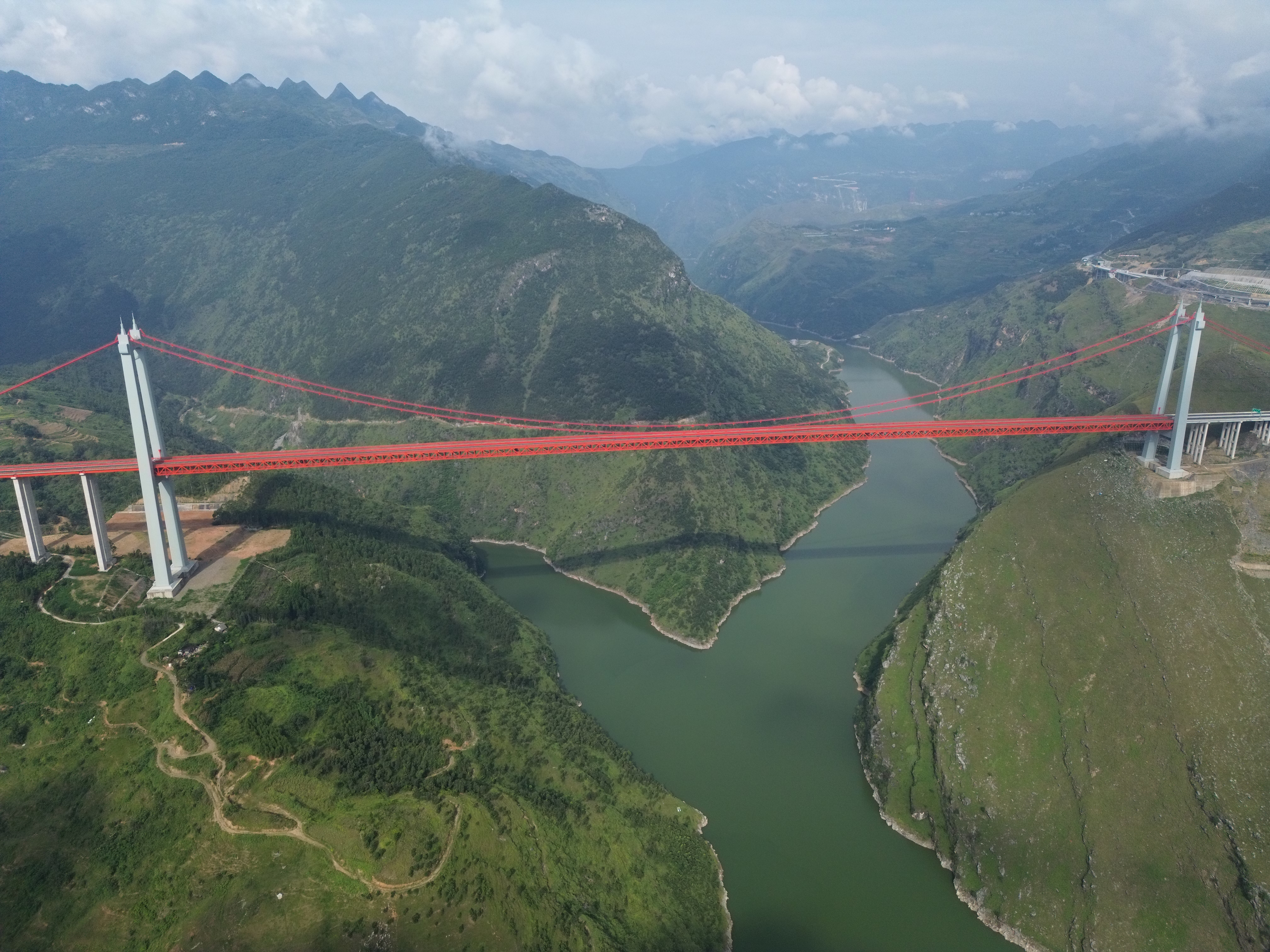
- Coordinates: 26°09′59″N 105°06′45″E
- Carries: G7612 Nayong–Xingyi Expressway
- Crosses: Beipan River
- Locale: Shuicheng–Pu'an County, Guizhou, China

Characteristics
- Design: Suspension bridge
- Material: Concrete and steel
- Total length: 1,849 m (6,066 ft)
- Width: 28 m (92 ft)
- Height: 174.1 m (571 ft) (north tower); 248.1 m (814 ft) (south tower)
- Longest span: 1,080 m (3,540 ft)
- Clearance below: 410 m (1,350 ft)

History
- Construction start: 18 November 2021
- Construction end: 14 February 2025

Location
- Interactive map of Zangkejiang Bridge

The Zangkejiang Bridge is a suspension bridge over the Beipan River in Guizhou, China. The bridge is one of the highest in the world and also one of the longest suspension bridges with a main span of 1,080 m (3,540 ft). The Guangzhao Dam has reduced the height of the bridge.

== See also ==
- List of bridges in China
- List of longest suspension bridge spans
- List of highest bridges
- List of tallest bridges
