= Jinqi Bridge =

Bridge in southwestern China

Jinqi Bridge 金旗特大桥
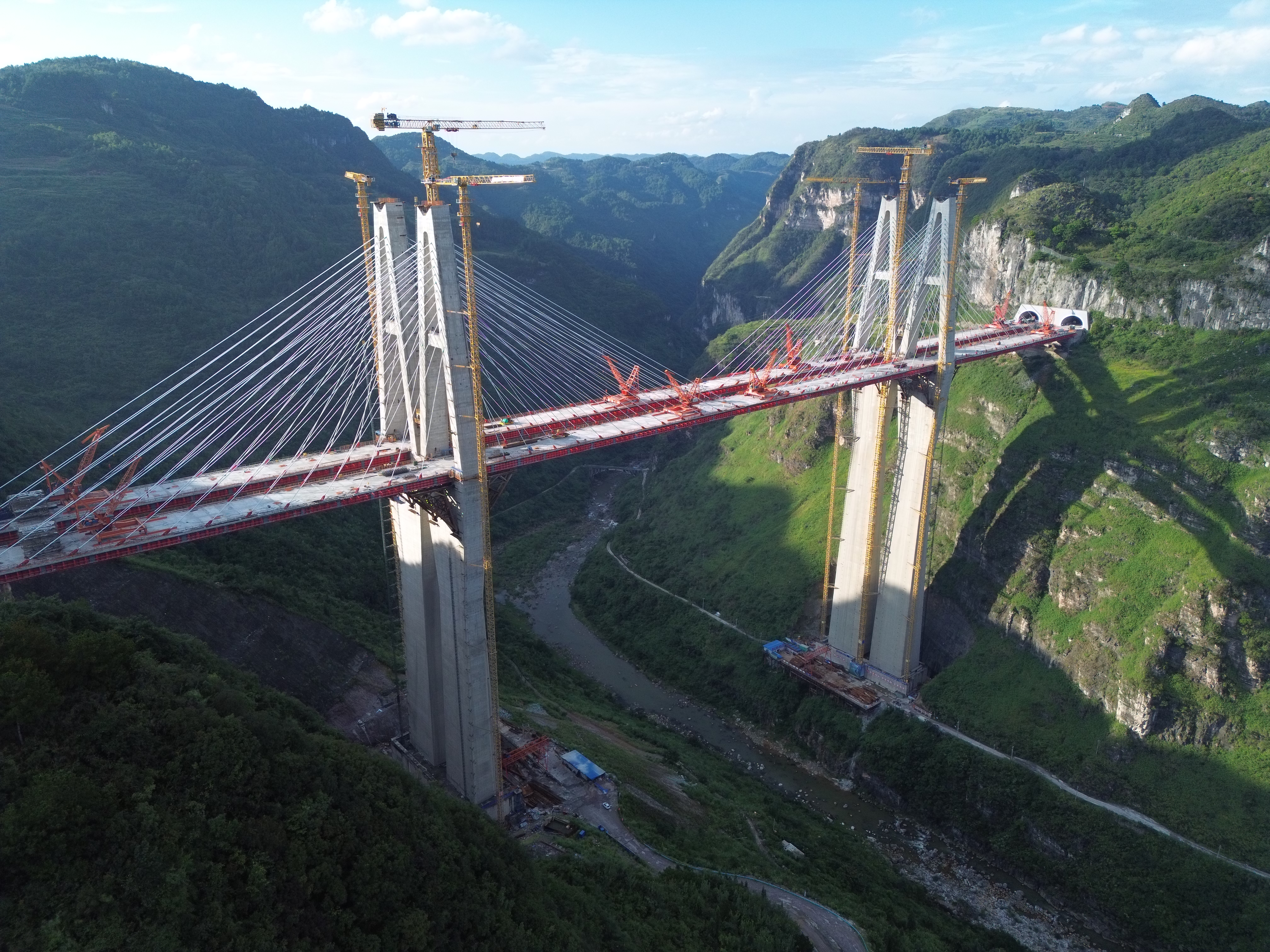
- Coordinates: 26°49′10.0″N 106°26′19.9″E
- Carries: Wuchang Expressway
- Crosses: Maotiao River
- Locale: Qingzhen–Xiuwen County, Guizhou

Characteristics
- Design: Cable-stayed bridge
- Total length: 672 metres (2,205 ft)
- Height: north tower 300.6 metres (986 ft)
- Longest span: 320 metres (1,050 ft)
- Clearance below: 258 metres (846 ft)
- No. of lanes: 6

Location
- Interactive map of Jinqi Bridge

The Jinqi Bridge (Chinese: 金旗特大桥) is a bridge between Qingzhen and Xiuwen County, Guizhou, China over the Maotiao River.

With a height of 300.6 metres (986 ft), the north tower is one of the tallest bridge structure in the world, it is also one of the highest bridge in the world with a deck 258 metres (846 ft) above the river.

The span arrangement is 169–320–169 metres (554–1,050–554 ft).

== See also ==
- List of highest bridges
- List of tallest bridges
