= Lancang River Railway Bridge =

Lancang River Darui Railway Bridge 大瑞铁路澜沧江特大桥
- Coordinates: 25.2901°N 99.3500°E
- Carries: Railway
- Crosses: Lancang River
- Locale: Baoshan, Yunnan, China

Characteristics
- Design: Arch
- Total length: 528.1 m (1,733 ft)
- Longest span: 342 m (1,122 ft)
- Clearance below: 271 m (889 ft)

History
- Designer: China Railway
- Construction end: 28 June 2020
- Opened: 22 July 2022

Location
- Interactive map of Lancang River Darui Railway Bridge

The Lancang River Railway Bridge is an arch bridge in Dali-Ruili Railway near city of Baoshan in western Yunnan Province, China. It is one of the highest in world, sitting 271 m (889 ft) above the Lancang River. The bridge's main span will be 342 m (1,122 ft) making it also one of the longest arch bridges ever built. The bridge is completed in 2022.

== Design ==
Instead of using cable stays and tiebacks to build the arch, the two steel truss arch halves were built vertically on either side of the canyon slopes on top of scaffolding. While still in a vertical position, the two halves were then lowered over the gorge where they were connected at the crown. The total length of the bridge is 698 meters.

== Site ==
The site showcases three high spans including an older suspension bridge, the new railway bridge and a high pipeline suspension bridge that is the third-highest of its type in the world after the Hegigio Gorge Pipeline Bridge in Papua New Guinea and the Niouc Bridge in Switzerland.

The official height of the bridge is 271 meters, measured to the river's original surface. The construction of the Xiaowan Dam downstream created a reservoir that extends back under the bridge and raised the water level some 50 meters.

== See also ==
- List of bridges in China
- List of longest arch bridge spans
- List of highest bridges
- List of crossings of the Mekong River
