= Yalong Liangshan Bridge =

Yalong Liangshan Bridge 雅砻江大桥
- Coordinates: 27°42′32″N 102°0′1″E
- Carries: G7611 Duyun–Shangri-La Expressway
- Crosses: Yalong River
- Locale: Yanyuan County, Sichuan

Characteristics
- Design: Suspension
- Material: Steel, concrete
- Total length: 1,482 m (4,862 ft)
- Height: 231.2 m (759 ft)
- Longest span: 1,200 m (3,900 ft)
- Clearance below: 480 m (1,570 ft)
- No. of lanes: 4

History
- Construction end: 2028

Location
- Interactive map of Yalong Liangshan Bridge

The Yalong Liangshan Bridge (Chinese: 雅砻江大桥) is a suspension bridge over the Yalong River in Yanyuan County, Sichuan, China. The bridge is one of the highest bridges in the world with a deck 480 m (1,570 ft) above the river.

== See also ==
- List of bridges in China
- List of longest suspension bridge spans
- List of highest bridges
