= Qingshui River Bridge =

Suspension bridge

Qingshui River Bridge 清水河特大桥
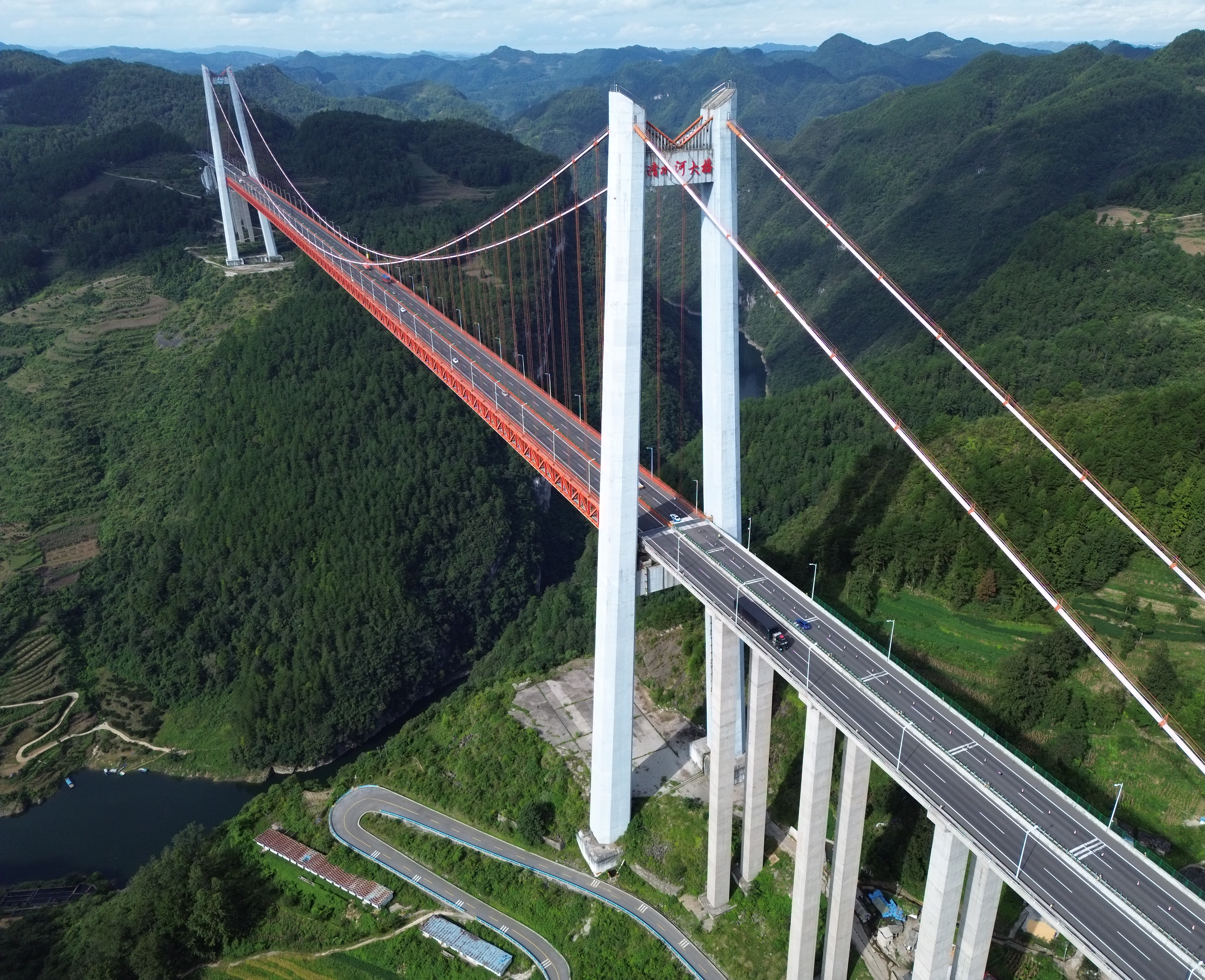
- Coordinates: 27.030414°N 107.189340°E
- Carries: Expressway
- Crosses: Qingshui River
- Locale: Guizhou, China

Characteristics
- Design: Suspension
- Material: Steel
- Total length: 2,188 m (7,178 ft)
- Height: 236 m (774 ft)
- Longest span: 1,130 m (3,710 ft)
- Clearance below: 406 m (1,332 ft)

History
- Opened: December 31, 2015

Location
- Interactive map of Qingshui River Bridge

The Qingshui River Bridge (Qingshuihe Bridge) is a suspension bridge in Guizhou, China. The bridge, measuring 406 m (1,332 ft) above the Qingshuihe River, is the third highest suspension bridge in world. It is also one of the longest bridges with a main span of 1,130 m (3,710 ft).

The two towers of the suspension bridge are 230 m (750 ft) and 224 m (735 ft) tall. The main span uses a steel truss for deck support and stiffening.

The bridge is part of the Guiweng Expressway. The bridge cost ¥1.54billion (£158million). The bridge was built to improve transportation in the region and will shorten the travel distance between Weng'an County and Guiyang from 160 km down to 38 km. The bridge was opened for traffic on December 31, 2015.

== See also ==
- List of bridges in China
- List of highest bridges in the world
- List of longest suspension bridge spans
