= Zongxihe Bridge =

Zongxihe Bridge 总溪河大桥
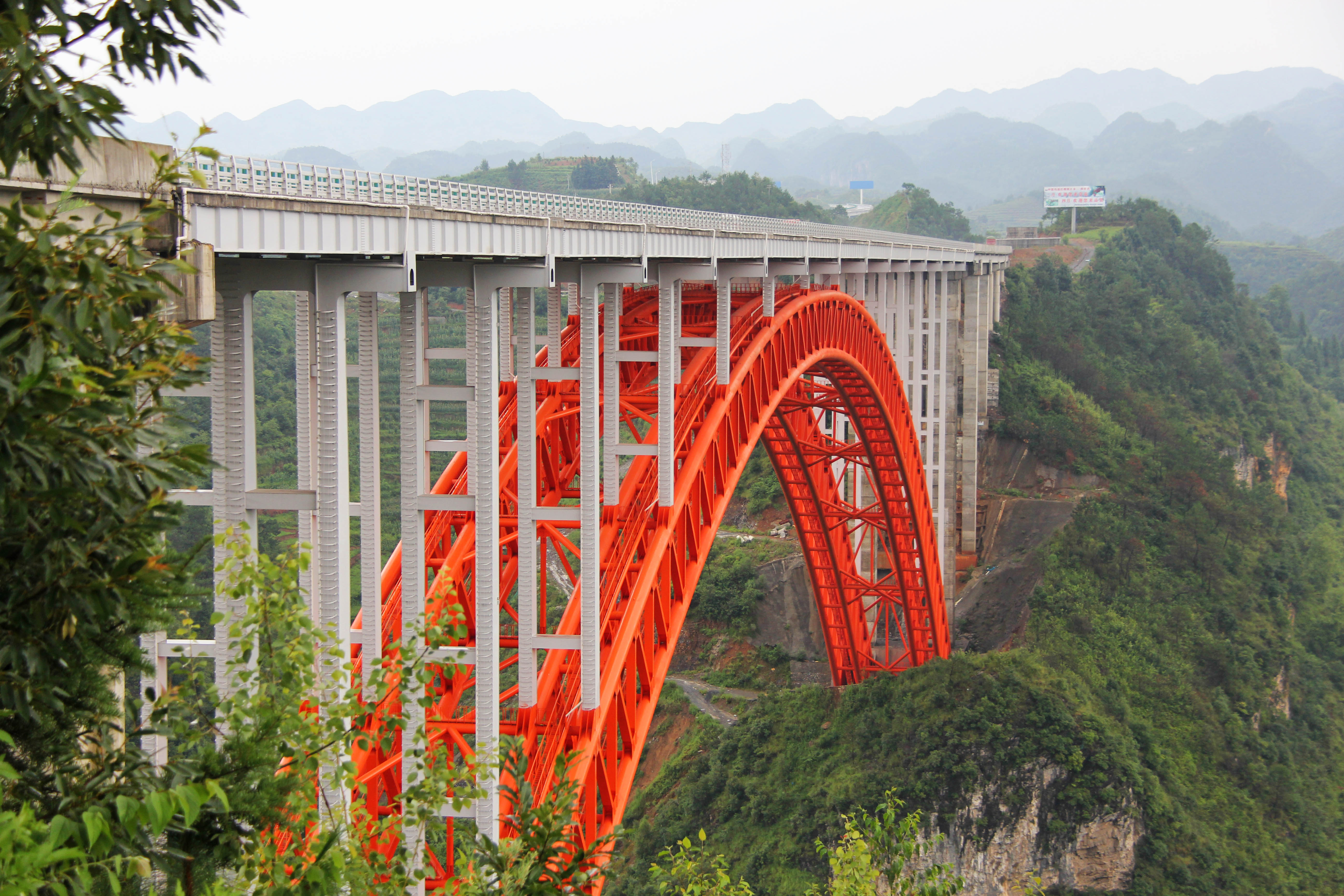
- Coordinates: 27.023°N 105.241°E
- Carries: G56 Hangzhou–Ruili Expressway
- Crosses: Liuchong River
- Locale: Nayong County, Bijie, Guizhou, China

Characteristics
- Design: Arch Bridge
- Material: Concrete filled steel tube
- Total length: 924.5 m (3,033 ft)
- Height: 69 m (226 ft)
- Longest span: 360 m (1,180 ft)
- Clearance below: 264 m (866 ft)

History
- Construction end: 2015
- Opened: 2016

Location
- Interactive map of Zongxihe Bridge

Zongxihe Bridge is an arch bridge in Nayong County, Bijie, Guizhou, China. At 264 m (866 ft), the bridge is one of the highest in world. The bridge is part of the new G56 Hangzhou–Ruili Expressway between Bijie and Liupanshui. The bridge crosses the Liuchong River.

== See also ==
- List of highest bridges in the world
- List of longest arch bridge spans
