= G7512 Guiyang–Chengdu Expressway =

Road in China

Guiyang–Chengdu Expressway
- 贵阳－成都高速公路
- Zhurong Expressway 筑蓉高速公路

Route information
- Auxiliary route of G75

Major junctions
- North end: G5 / G4202 in Jinjiang District, Chengdu, Sichuan
- South end: G6002 in Baiyun District, Guiyang, Guizhou

Location
- Country: China

Highway system
- National Trunk Highway System; Primary; Auxiliary; National Highways; Transport in China
← G7511	→ G7521

The G7512 Guiyang–Chengdu Expressway (Chinese: 贵阳—成都高速公路), also referred to as the Zhurong Expressway (Chinese: 筑蓉高速公路), is an expressway in China that connects the cities of Guiyang, Guizhou and Chengdu, Sichuan.

== Route ==
The expressway begins in Baiyun District, Guiyang, passing through Xiuwen, Jinsha, Gulin, Xuyong, Xingwen, Gong, Yibin, Rong, Jianyang, and ends in Jinjiang District, Chengdu.
