= Nanmengxi Bridge =

Bridge in southwestern China

Nanmengxi Bridge 南孟溪特大桥
- Coordinates: 26°33′27″N 108°51′08″E
- Carries: S72 Jianhe–Liping Expy
- Crosses: Qingshui River (Yuan River)
- Locale: Jinping County, Guizhou

Characteristics
- Design: Cable-stayed bridge
- Total length: 987.5 metres (3,240 ft)
- Height: 253.5 metres (832 ft)
- Longest span: 360 metres (1,180 ft)
- Clearance below: 287 metres (942 ft)
- No. of lanes: 4

History
- Construction start: April 2021
- Construction end: April 2024
- Opened: 2024

Location
- Interactive map of Nanmengxi Bridge

The Nanmengxi Bridge (Chinese: 南孟溪特大桥) is a bridge in Jinping County, Guizhou, China. It is one of the tallest bridge structure in the world with a west tower 253.5 metres (832 ft) tall and one of the highest bridge in the world with a deck 287 metres (942 ft) above the river.

== See also ==
- List of highest bridges
- List of tallest bridges
