= Guniuhe Bridge =

Guniuhe Bridge 古牛河特大桥
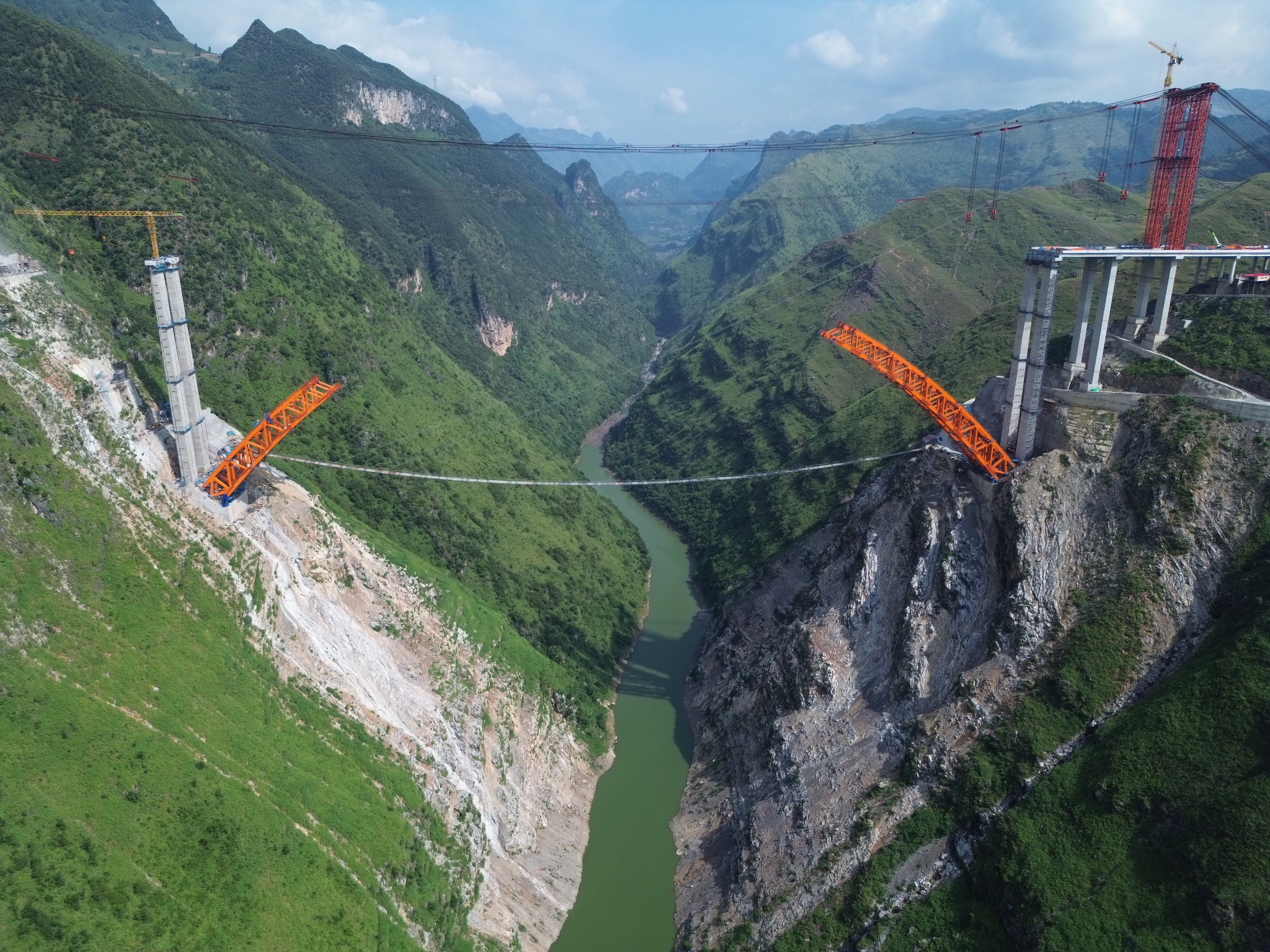
- The bridge during construction in September 2025
- Coordinates: 26°11′37″N 105°2′37″E
- Carries: Anshun–Panzhou Expy
- Crosses: Guniu River
- Locale: Shuicheng, Guizhou

Characteristics
- Design: Steel deck arch bridge
- Total length: 845.8 m (2,775 ft)
- Width: 38.5 m (126 ft)
- Longest span: 520 m (1,710 ft)
- Clearance below: 405 m (1,329 ft)

History
- Construction end: 2026

Location
- Interactive map of Guniuhe Bridge

The Guniuhe Bridge (Chinese: 古牛河特大桥) is a steel deck arch bridge over the Guniu River in Shuicheng, Guizhou, China. The bridge is one of the highest bridges in the world with a deck 405 metres (1,329 ft) above the river.

The arch was completed on January 5, 2026.

== See also ==
- List of bridges in China
- List of longest arch bridge spans
- List of highest bridges
