= Puzhehei Bridge =

Puzhehei Bridge 南盘江普者黑特大桥
- Coordinates: 24.2830°N 103.8146°E
- Carries: Luqiuguangfu Expressway
- Crosses: Nanpan River
- Locale: Yunnan, China

Characteristics
- Design: Cable-stayed bridge
- Material: Steel
- Total length: 1,777 metres (5,830 ft)
- Height: 385 metres (1,263 ft)
- Longest span: 930 metres (3,050 ft)
- Clearance above: 475 metres (1,558 ft)

History
- Construction end: 2029

Location
- Interactive map of Puzhehei Bridge

The Puzhehei Bridge is a cable-stayed bridge under construction in Yunnan, China. When completed the bridge will be the tallest in the world with the western tower having a structural height of 385 metres (1,263 ft). It will surpass the height of the current tallest bridge, the Millau Viaduct by 38 metres (125 ft). The bridge will carry the new Luqiuguangfu Expressway across the valley of the Nanpan River.

The bridge will be among the ten longest cable-stayed bridges in the world with a main span of 930 metres (3,050 ft). It will also be one of the highest bridges in the world sitting 475 metres (1,558 ft) above the original level of the Nanpan River. The full height won't be visible as the bridge will cross over the Yunpeng Dam reservoir so will sit 444 m (1,457 ft) above water level.

== See also ==
- List of tallest bridges
- List of highest bridges
- List of longest cable-stayed bridge spans
