= Longli Bridge =

Bridge in southwestern China

Longli Bridge 龙里河大桥
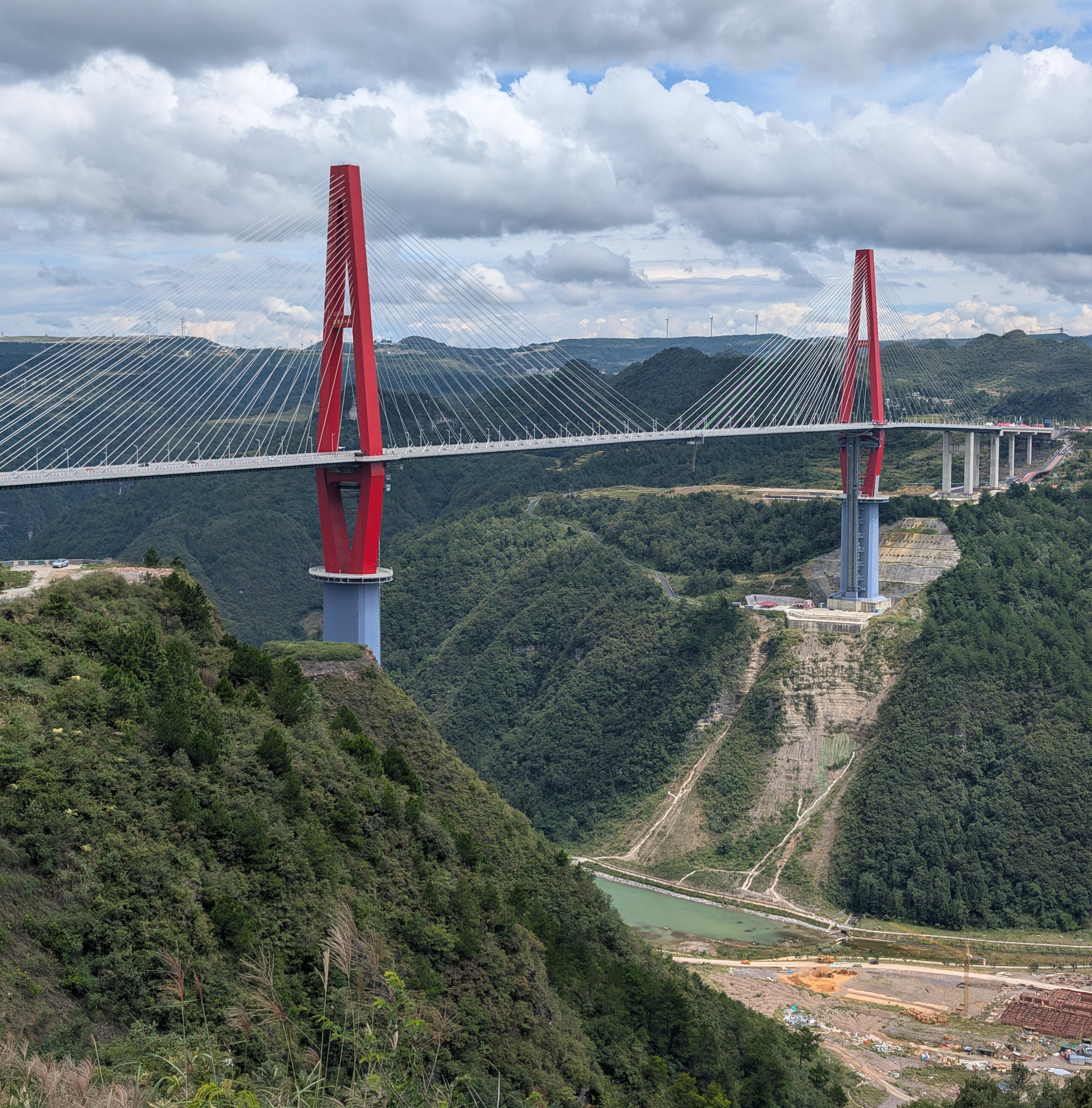
- Coordinates: 26°23′09.5″N 106°50′59.1″E
- Carries: Road
- Crosses: Longli River
- Locale: Longli County, Guizhou

Characteristics
- Design: Cable-stayed bridge
- Total length: 1,260 metres (4,130 ft)
- Height: west tower 254.8 metres (836 ft) east tower 244.6 metres (802 ft)
- Longest span: 528 metres (1,732 ft)
- Clearance below: 288 metres (945 ft)
- No. of lanes: 4

History
- Opened: April 27, 2024

Location
- Interactive map of Longli Bridge

The Longli Bridge (Chinese: 龙里河大桥) is a bridge in Longli County, Guizhou, China. With a height of 254.8 metres (836 ft), the west tower is one of the tallest bridge structure in the world, it is also one of the highest bridge in the world with a deck 288 metres (945 ft) above the river. It was opened to traffic on 27 April 2024.

== See also ==
- List of highest bridges
- List of tallest bridges
- List of longest cable-stayed bridge spans
