= Pipeline bridge =

Bridge for running a pipeline over an obstacle

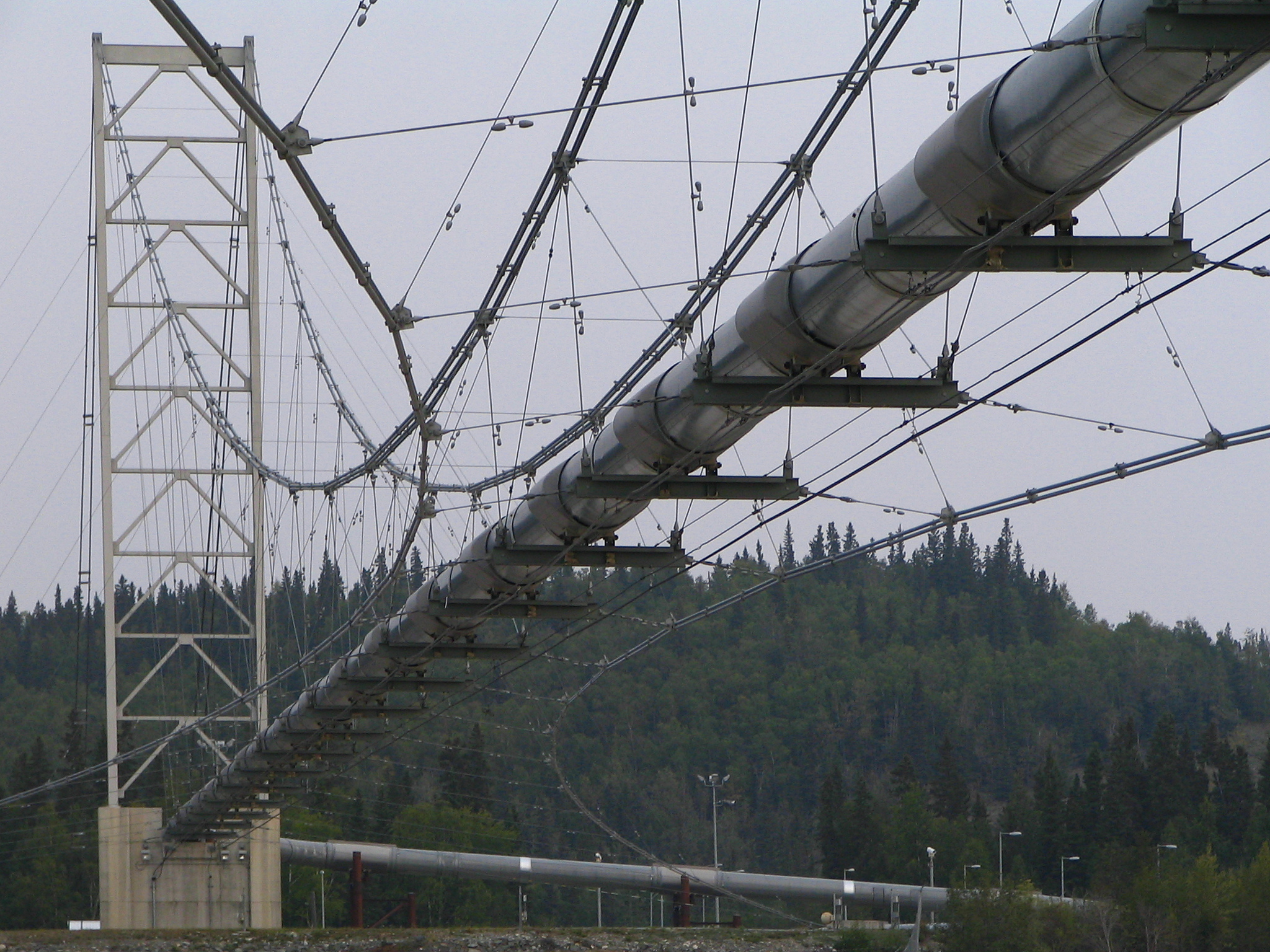
A pipeline bridge carrying the Trans-Alaska Pipeline

A pipeline bridge is a bridge for running a pipeline over a river or another obstacle. Pipeline bridges for liquids and gases are, as a rule, only built when it is not possible to run the pipeline on a conventional bridge or under the river. However, as it is more common to run pipelines for centralized heating systems overhead, for this application even small pipeline bridges are common.

Pipeline bridges may be made of steel, fiber reinforced polymer, reinforced concrete or similar materials. They may vary in size and style depending on the size of the pipeline being run. As there is normally a steady flow in pipelines, they can be designed as suspension bridges. They may also be added to an existing bridge. A pipeline bridge may be equipped with a walkway for maintenance purposes, but for safety and security reasons, the walkway is usually not open to the public.

One of the world's longest pipeline bridges, built in 1970, is 1,040 meters long and crosses the Fuji River in Shizuoka Prefecture of Japan. The highest at 393 m is Hegigio Gorge Pipeline Bridge in Papua New Guinea.

== See also ==
- Pipe rack
