= Hegigio Gorge Pipeline Bridge =

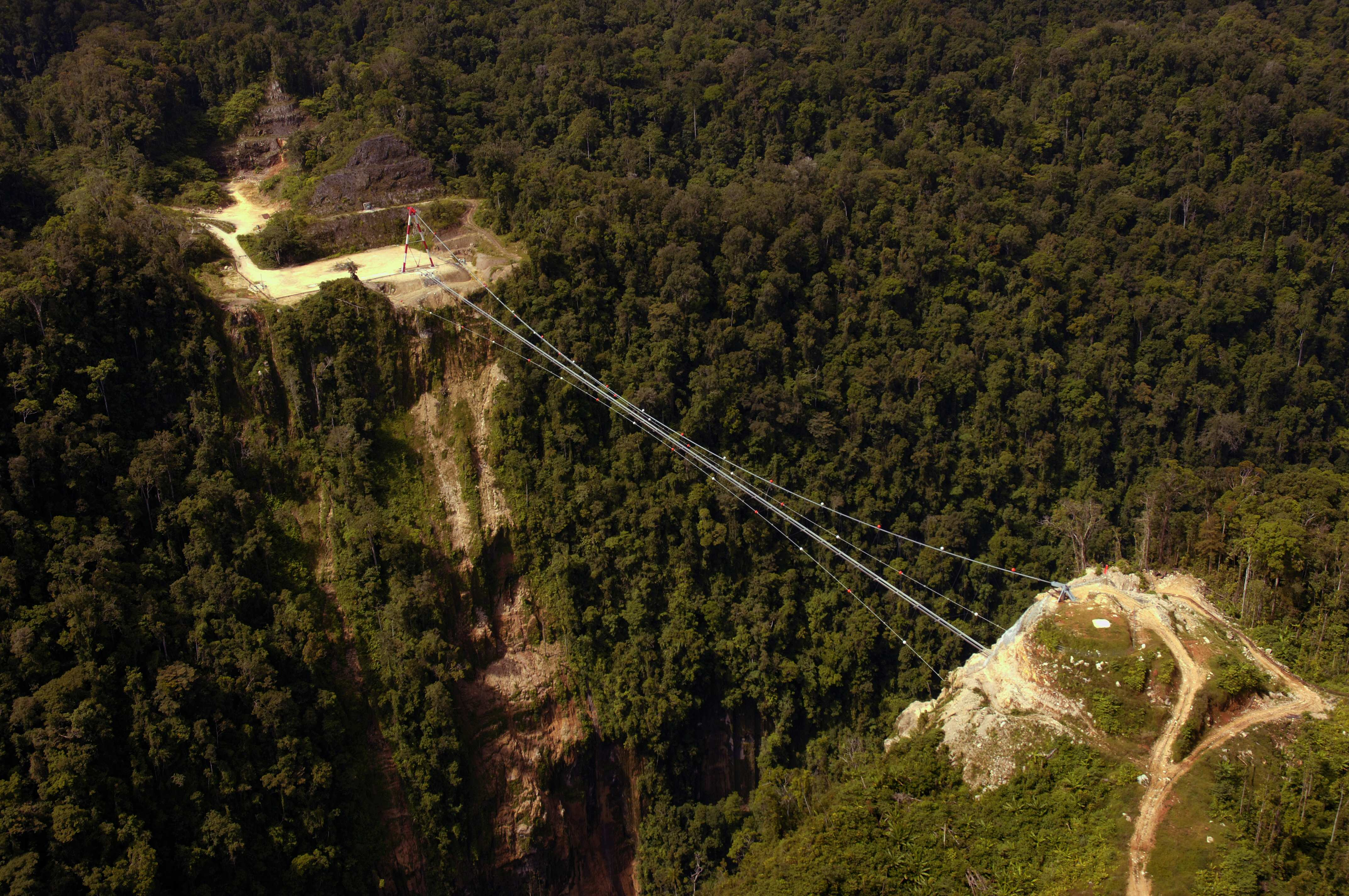
- Hegigio Gorge Bridge in 2006
- Coordinates: 6.328351°S 143.105199°E
- Carried: Oil
- Crossed: Hegigio gorge of the Tagari River
- Locale: Southern Highlands Province of Papua New Guinea

Characteristics
- Design: Suspension
- Material: Steel
- Total length: 470 m (1,540 ft)
- Height: 33 m (108 ft)
- No. of spans: Hegigio Gorge Pipeline Bridge
- Clearance below: 393 m (1,289 ft)

History
- Designer: Ken Ross
- Construction start: December 2004
- Construction end: November 2005
- Opened: March 2006
- Closed: February 2018
- Demolished: 2026-2027

Location
- Interactive map of Hegigio Gorge Pipeline Bridge

Hegigio Gorge Pipeline Bridge was, with a height of 393 metres, one of the world's highest bridges and highest pipeline bridge. Hegigio Gorge Pipeline Bridge was a suspension bridge spanning 470 metres over the Tagari River in Papua New Guinea. It was used for transporting petroleum oil from Southeast Mananda oil field in the Southern Highlands Province.

Hegigio Gorge Pipeline Bridge became the world's highest bridge when it was completed in 2005 and remained the highest until the opening of the Sidu River Bridge in China in 2009.

The bridge was severely damaged in the 2018 Papua New Guinea earthquake and was decommissioned in the years after.

== See also ==
- List of highest bridges in the world
