= Tongzihe Bridge Jinrentong =

Bridge in southwestern China

Tongzihe Bridge Jinrentong 金仁桐高速公路桐梓河特大桥
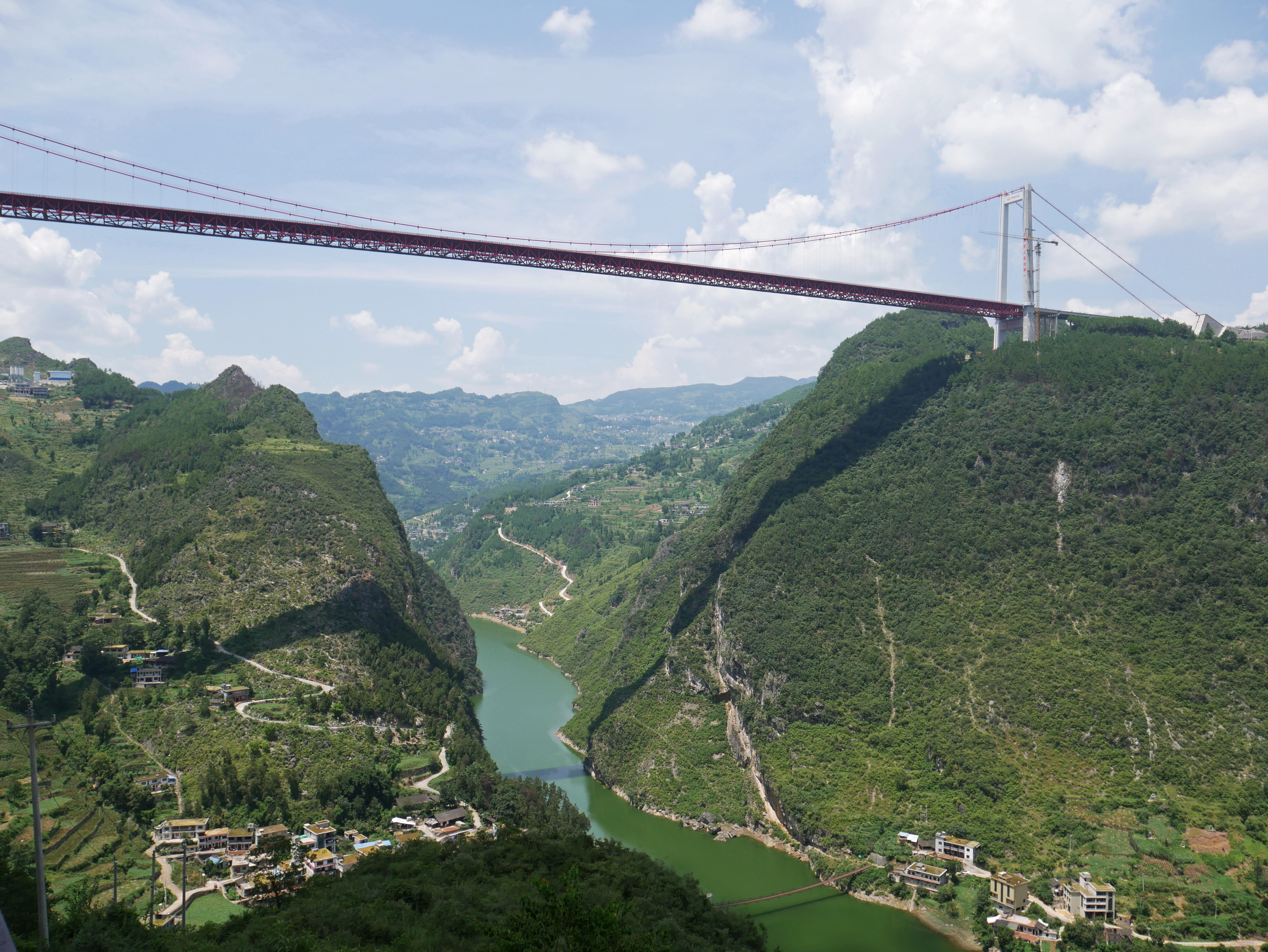
- Coordinates: 28°2′17″N 106°32′18″E
- Carries: S14 Xinjin Expy
- Crosses: Tongzi River
- Locale: Renhuai, Guizhou

Characteristics
- Design: Suspension bridge
- Total length: 1,422 metres (4,665 ft)
- Width: 29 metres (95 ft)
- Height: north tower 140 metres (460 ft) south tower 208 metres (682 ft)
- Longest span: 965 metres (3,166 ft)
- Clearance below: 365 metres (1,198 ft)
- No. of lanes: 4

History
- Opened: 13 September 2024

Location
- Interactive map of Tongzihe Bridge Jinrentong

The Tongzihe Bridge Jinrentong (Chinese: 金仁桐高速公路桐梓河特大桥) is a bridge in Renhuai, Guizhou, China. With a height of 365 metres (1,198 ft) over the Tongzi River, it is one of the highest bridge in the world. It was opened to traffic on 13 September 2024.

== See also ==
- List of bridges in China
- List of highest bridges
- List of longest suspension bridge spans
