= Tianmen Bridge =

Tianmen Bridge 天门特大桥
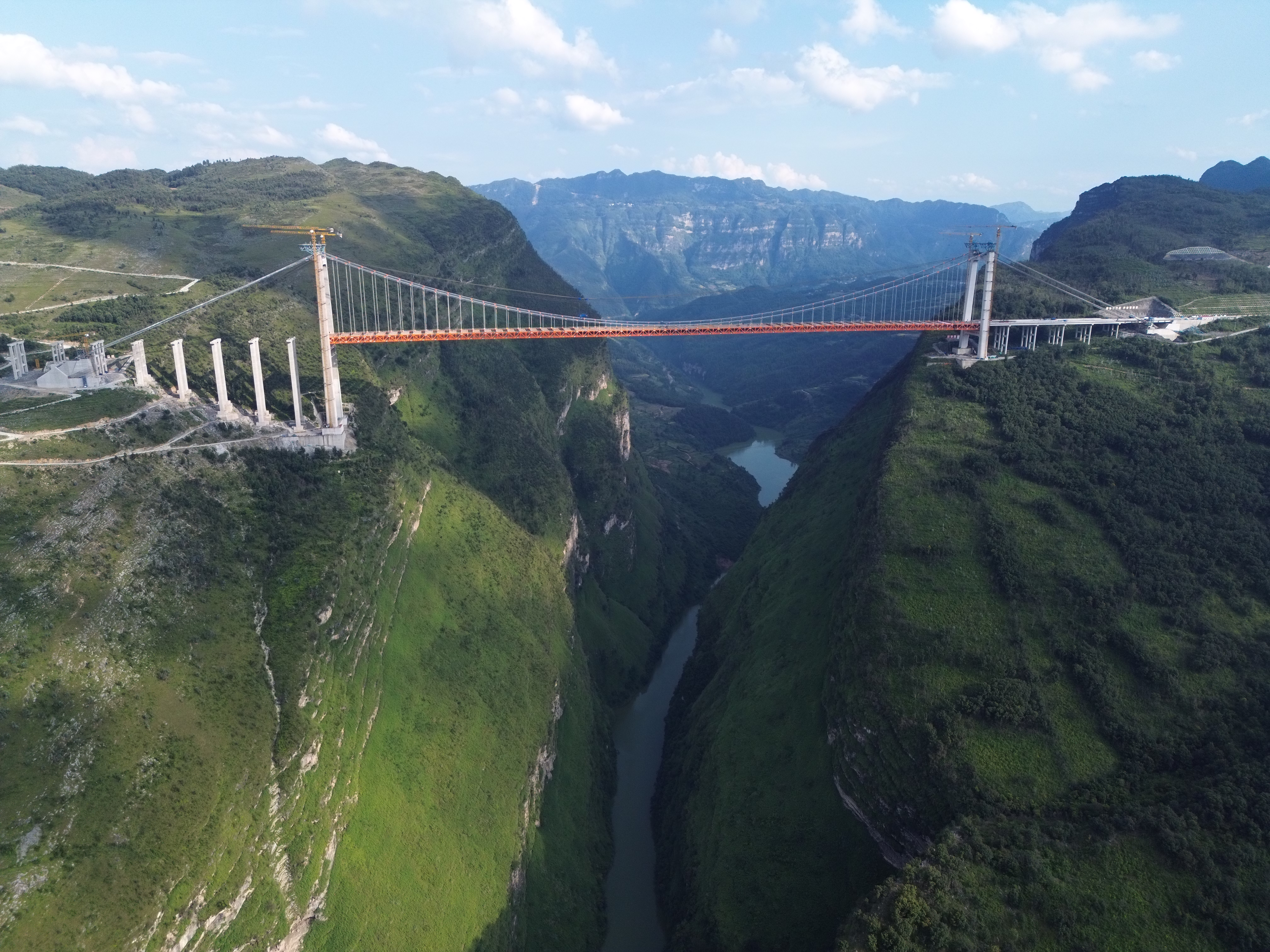
- The bridge during construction in September 2025
- Coordinates: 26°9′36″N 104°57′52″E
- Carries: Anshun–Panzhou Expy
- Crosses: Beipan River
- Locale: Shuicheng, Guizhou

Characteristics
- Design: Suspension
- Material: Steel, concrete
- Total length: 1,553 m (5,095 ft)
- Height: 200 m (660 ft) (east tower); 135 m (443 ft) (west tower)
- Longest span: 820 m (2,690 ft)
- Clearance below: 560 m (1,840 ft)
- No. of lanes: 4

History
- Construction end: 2026

Location
- Interactive map of Tianmen Bridge

The Tianmen Bridge (Chinese: 天门特大桥) is a suspension bridge over the Beipan River in Shuicheng, Guizhou, China. The bridge is one of the highest bridges in the world with a deck 560 m (1,840 ft) above the river.

== See also ==
- List of bridges in China
- List of longest suspension bridge spans
- List of highest bridges
