= Yongren Bridge =

Bridge in southwestern China

Yongren Bridge 永仁特大桥
- Coordinates: 25°53′51″N 101°29′39″E
- Carries: S45 Yongren–Jinshui Expy
- Crosses: Jiangdi River
- Locale: Yongren County, Yunnan

Characteristics
- Design: Suspension bridge
- Material: Concrete towers, steel box girder deck
- Total length: 1,671 metres (5,482 ft)
- Width: 31 metres (102 ft)
- Height: north tower 192.7 metres (632 ft) south tower 107.7 metres (353 ft)
- Longest span: 920 metres (3,020 ft)
- Clearance below: 352 metres (1,155 ft)
- No. of lanes: 4

History
- Construction start: 8 May 2020
- Opened: 9 June 2023

Location
- Interactive map of Yongren Bridge

The Yongren Bridge (Chinese: 永仁特大桥) is a bridge in Yongren County, Yunnan, China. It is one of the highest bridge in the world with a deck 352 metres (1,155 ft) above the river.

It was opened to traffic on 9 June 2023.

== See also ==
- List of highest bridges
- List of longest suspension bridge spans
