= Lvzhijiang Bridge =

Bridge in southwestern China

Lvzhijiang Bridge 绿汁江大桥
- Coordinates: 24°42′26″N 101°56′49″E
- Carries: G8012 Mile–Chuxiong Expressway
- Crosses: Lvzhi River
- Locale: Shuangbai County–Yimen County, Yunnan

Characteristics
- Design: Single tower suspension bridge
- Material: Concrete tower, steel box girder deck
- Total length: 806 metres (2,644 ft)
- Width: 31.4 metres (103 ft)
- Height: 156 metres (512 ft)
- Longest span: 780 metres (2,560 ft)
- Clearance below: 320 metres (1,050 ft)
- No. of lanes: 4

History
- Construction start: 22 January 2019
- Opened: 26 August 2022

Location
- Interactive map of Lvzhijiang Bridge

The Lvzhijiang Bridge or Lüzhijiang Bridge (Chinese: 绿汁江大桥; pinyin: Lǜzhījiāng Dàqiáo) is a bridge between Shuangbai County and Yimen County, Yunnan, China. The bridge has the distinction of being the largest single tower suspension bridge in the world with a span of 780 metres (2,560 ft).

It is also one of the highest bridge in the world with a deck 320 metres (1,050 ft) above the river.

It was opened to traffic on 26 August 2022.

== See also ==
- List of highest bridges
- List of longest suspension bridge spans
