= Zunyu Expressway Xiang River Bridge =

Bridge in southwestern China

Zunyu Expressway Xiang River Bridge 遵余湘江大桥
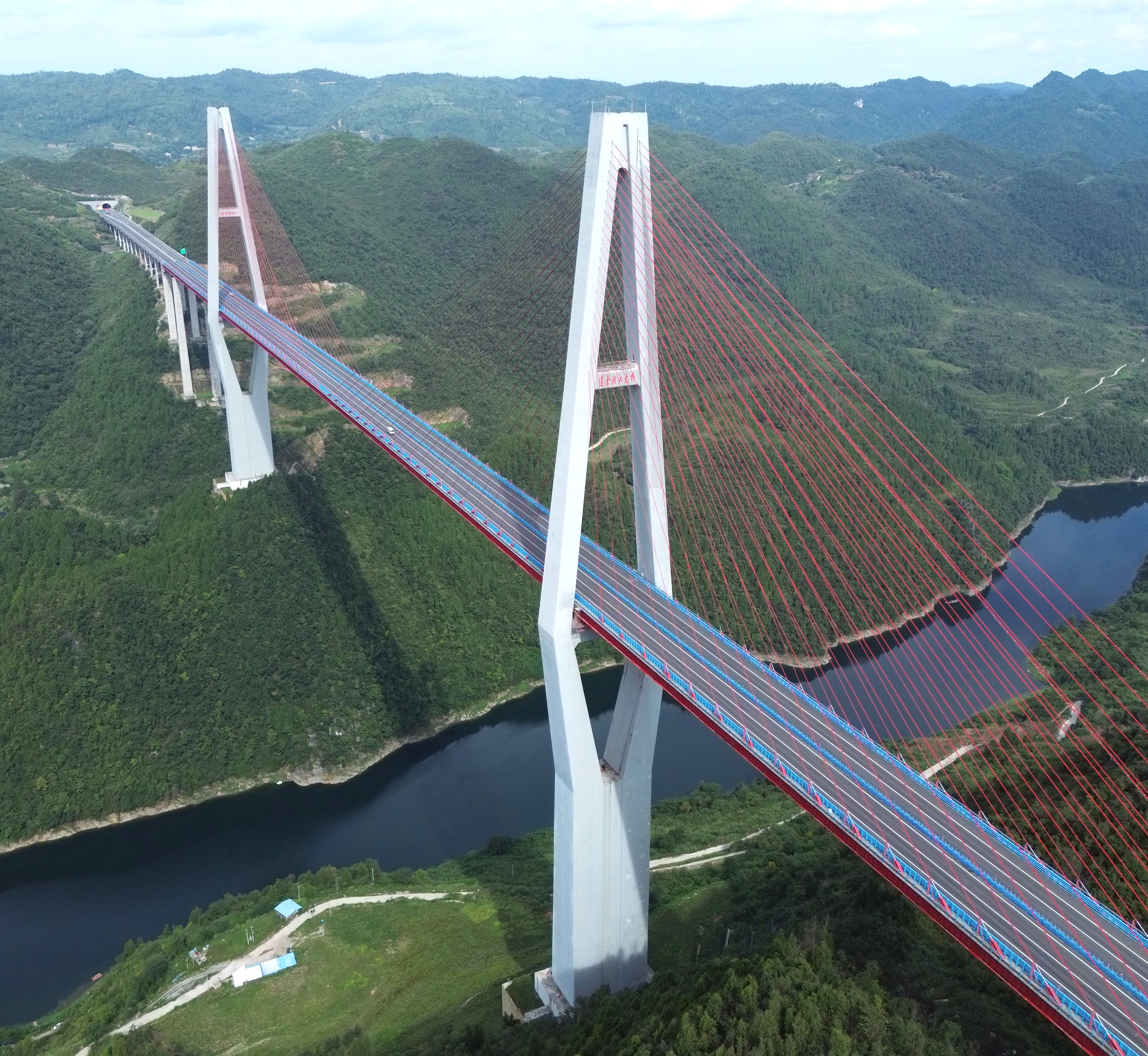
- Coordinates: 27°26′52″N 107°15′52″E
- Carries: S34 Yuqing–Zunyi Expy
- Crosses: Xiang River (Wu River tributary)
- Locale: Bozhou–Weng'an County, Guizhou

Characteristics
- Design: Cable-stayed bridge
- Total length: 1,648 metres (5,407 ft)
- Height: east tower 288 metres (945 ft)
- Longest span: 560 metres (1,840 ft)
- Clearance below: 304 metres (997 ft)
- No. of lanes: 4

History
- Construction start: September 2017
- Construction end: December 3, 2020
- Opened: July 1, 2021

Location
- Interactive map of Zunyu Expressway Xiang River Bridge

The Zunyu Expressway Xiang River Bridge is a bridge between Bozhou and Weng'an County, Guizhou, China over the Xiang River.

With a height of 288 metres (945 ft), the east tower is one of the tallest bridge structure in the world, it is also one of the highest bridge in the world with a deck 304 metres (997 ft) above the river. It was opened to traffic on 1 July 2021.

== See also ==
- List of highest bridges
- List of tallest bridges
- List of longest cable-stayed bridge spans
