= G78 Shantou–Kunming Expressway =

Road in China

Shantou–Kunming Expressway
- 汕头－昆明高速公路
- Shankun Expressway 汕昆高速公路

Route information
- Length: 1,882 km (1,169 mi) Length when complete.

Major junctions
- East end: G15 Shenyang–Haikou Expressway, Shantou, Guangdong
- West end: Shihuguan Interchange, 2nd Ring Road, Kunming, Yunnan

Location
- Country: China

Highway system
- National Trunk Highway System; Primary; Auxiliary; National Highways; Transport in China
← G7612	→ G80

The Shantou–Kunming Expressway (Chinese: 汕头—昆明高速公路), designated as G78 and commonly referred to as the Shankun Expressway (Chinese: 汕昆高速公路) is an expressway in China that connects the cities of Shantou, Guangdong, and Kunming, Yunnan. When complete, it will be 1,882 km (1,169 mi) in length.

== Route ==
=== Guangdong ===
In Guangdong, the expressway is complete only from Shantou to Longchuan County. Sections from Longchuan County to Huaiji County is under construction.

=== Guangxi ===
The expressway is complete from Pingle County to the Guangdong border and from Liuzhou to Yizhou.

=== Guizhou ===
The entire portion in Guizhou is under construction.

=== Yunnan ===
The expressway is complete only from Shilin Yi Autonomous County to Kunming.
