= Yangbaoshan Bridge =

Bridge in southwestern China

Yangbaoshan Bridge 阳宝山特大桥
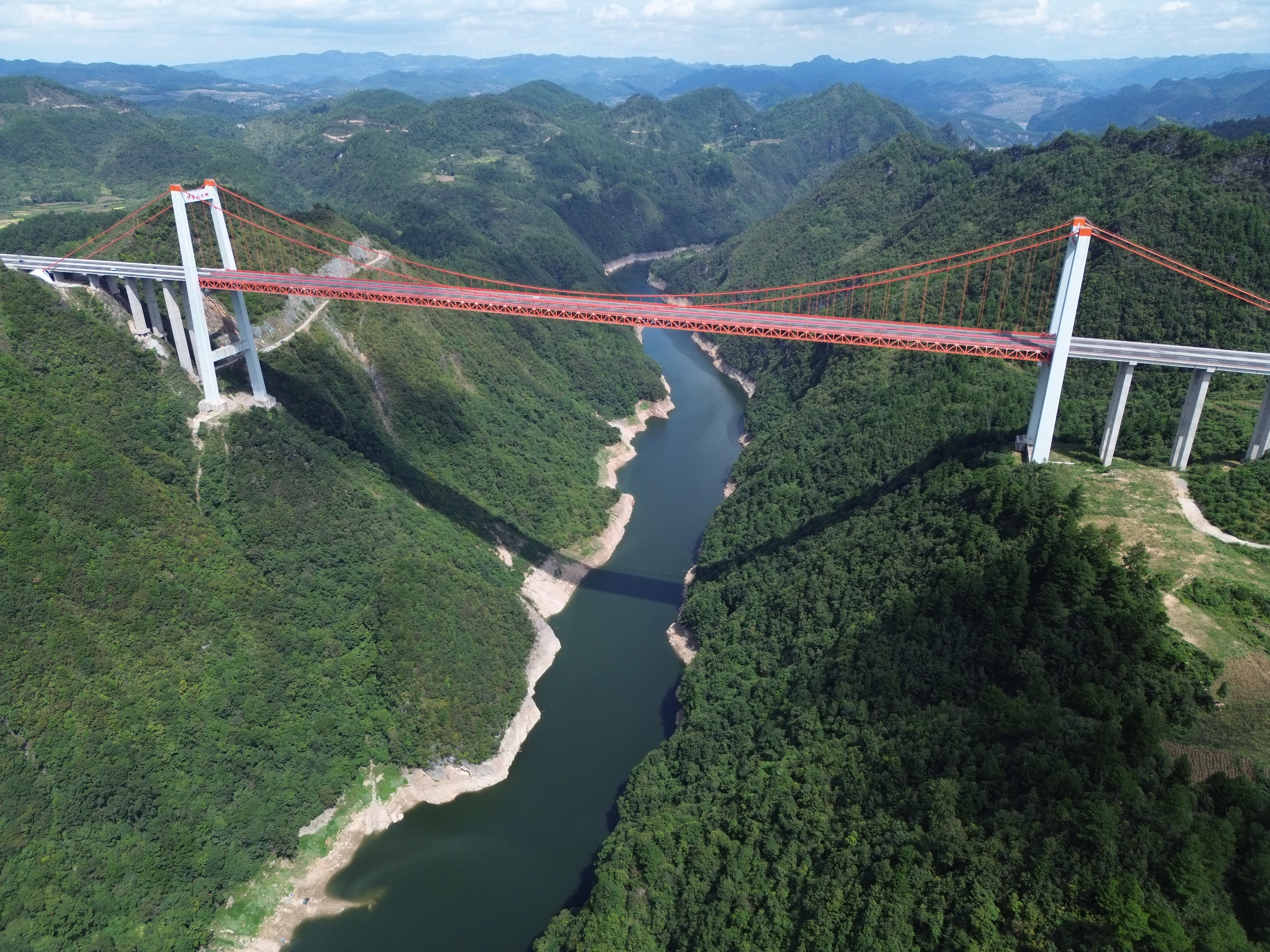
- Coordinates: 26°43′34″N 107°14′15″E
- Carries: S36 Guiyang–Huangping Expy
- Crosses: Dushui River (Qingshui River)
- Locale: Guiding County, Guizhou

Characteristics
- Design: Suspension bridge
- Total length: 1,112 metres (3,648 ft)
- Height: west tower 186.5 metres (612 ft)
- Longest span: 650 metres (2,130 ft)
- Clearance below: 360 metres (1,180 ft)
- No. of lanes: 6

History
- Opened: 31 May 2022

Location
- Interactive map of Yangbaoshan Bridge

The Yangbaoshan Bridge (Chinese: 阳宝山特大桥) is a bridge in Guiding County, Guizhou, China. It is one of the highest bridge in the world with a deck 360 metres (1,180 ft) above the river. It was opened to traffic on 31 May 2022.

== See also ==
- List of bridges in China
- List of highest bridges
- List of longest suspension bridge spans
