= Fenglin Bridge =

364-metre-high bridge under construction in the Guizhou province of China

Fenglin Bridge 峰林特大桥
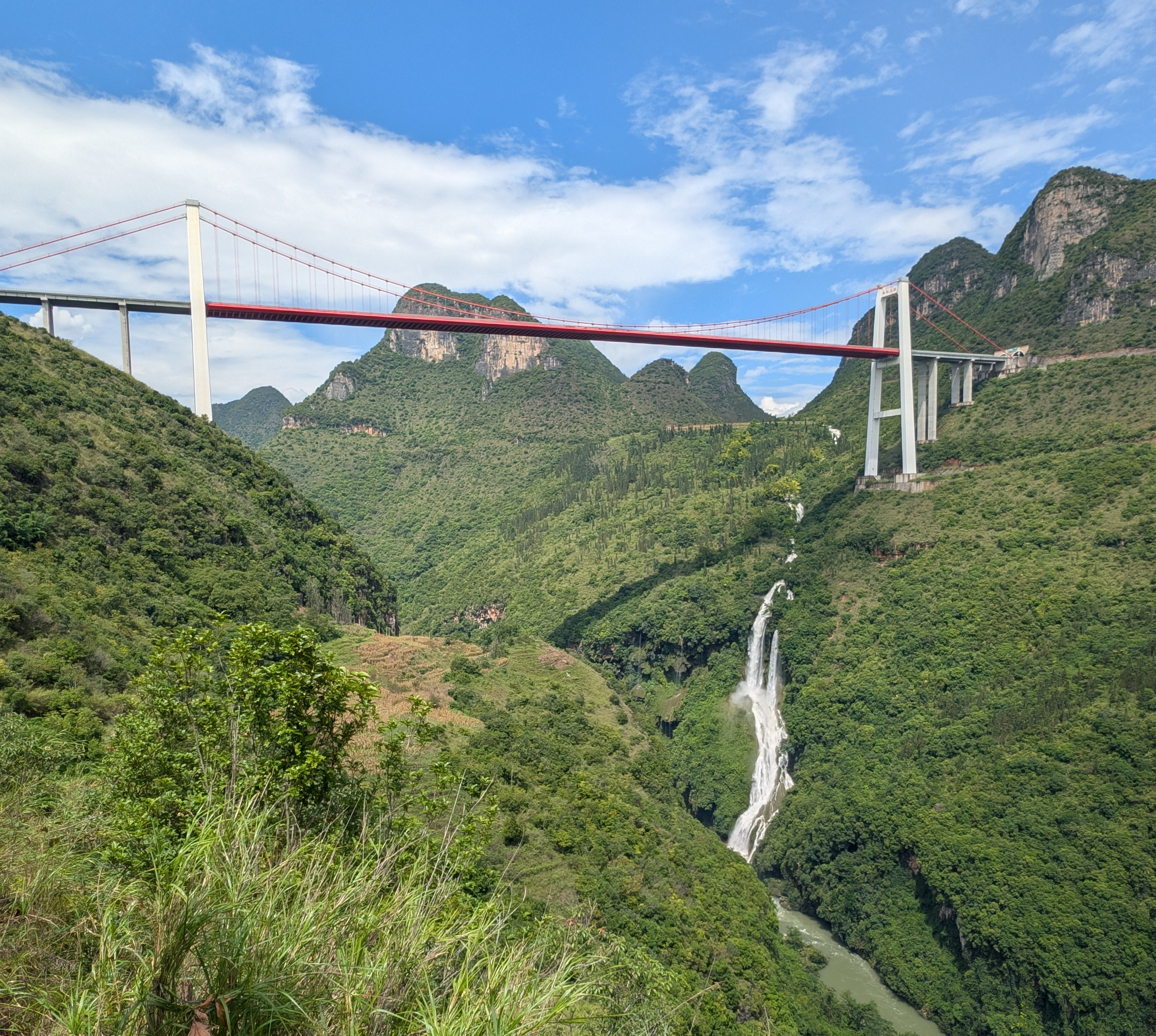
- Coordinates: 25.0755°N 104.9975°E
- Carries: S65 Expressway
- Locale: Xingyi, Guizhou, China

Characteristics
- Design: Suspension
- Height: 364 metres (1,194 ft)
- Longest span: 550 metres (1,800 ft)

History
- Construction end: 2021
- Opened: 1 March 2021

Location
- Interactive map of Fenglin Bridge

Fenglin Bridge is a 364-metre-high (1,194 ft) suspension bridge near Xingyi, Guizhou province of China. It is among the 25 highest bridges in the world. The bridge is located on S65 Expressway and crosses the Maling River (马别河) Canyon. The Maling River is a tributary of the Nanpan River. The bridge opened on 1 March 2021.

== See also ==
- List of highest bridges in the world
