= G69 Yinchuan–Baise Expressway =

Expressway in China

Yinchuan–Baise Expressway
- 银川－百色高速公路
- 银百高速公路; Yinbai Expressway

Major junctions
- North end: Yinchuan, Ningxia
- South end: in Baise, Guangxi

Location
- Country: China

Highway system
- National Trunk Highway System; Primary; Auxiliary; National Highways; Transport in China
← G6522	→ G6911

The Yinchuan–Baise Expressway (Chinese: 银川–百色高速公路), designated as G69 and commonly referred to as the Yinbai Expressway (Chinese: 银百高速公路), is a partially completed expressway in China. It is a major north-south expressway that when complete, will connect the cities of Yinchuan, the capital of Ningxia province, with Longbang town in Baise, in the autonomous region of Guangxi. On the border, the expressway connects to Quảng Ninh–Cao Bằng expressway in Vietnam. The expressway was announced as one of the eleven primary north-south expressways in China's expressway network on 24 May 2013.
