= Sidu River Bridge =

Sidu River Bridge 四渡河大桥
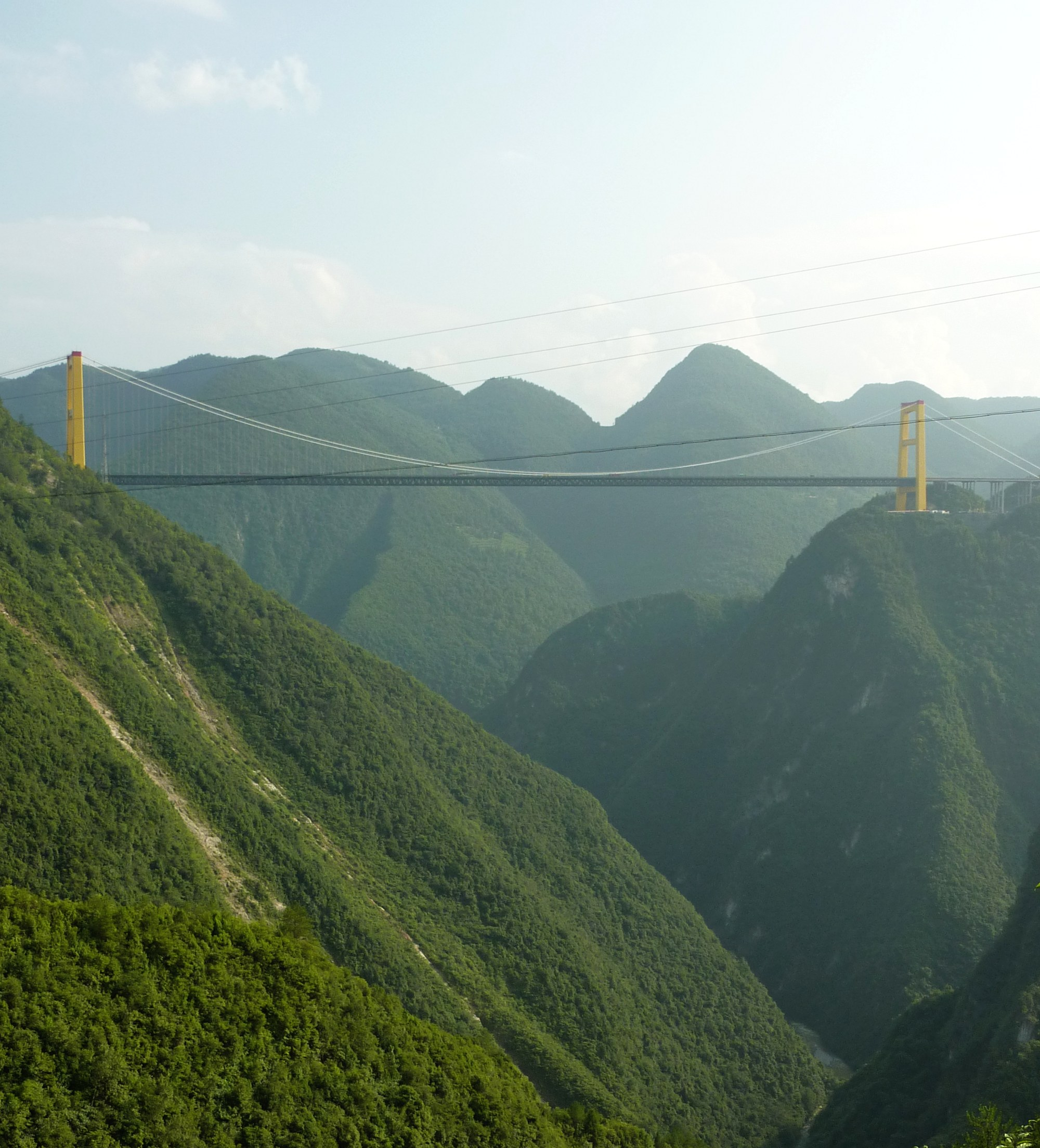
- Coordinates: 30.62123°N 110.395088°E
- Carries: G50 Shanghai–Chongqing Expressway
- Crosses: Sidu River
- Locale: near Yesanguan town, Badong County, Hubei, China

Characteristics
- Design: Suspension bridge
- Total length: 1,222 m (4,009 ft)
- Width: 24.5 m (80 ft)
- Longest span: 900 m (3,000 ft)
- Clearance below: 496 m (1,627 ft) (Note: It is not clear that these sources are measuring to the same point on the bridge. Some may be measuring from the bottom of the gorge to the top of the towers, explaining some of the discrepancies in the numbers reported. In addition to the numbers reported by Sakowski, Liu, and Wang, there are additional less-reliable sources on the internet that report the height at 560 m.)

History
- Designer: CCCC Second Highway Consultants Co. Ltd
- Opened: November 15, 2009

Location
- Interactive map of Sidu River Bridge

The Sidu River Bridge (Chinese: 四渡河大桥, romanized: Sìdù Hé Dà Qiáo) is a 1,222 m-long (4,009 ft) suspension bridge crossing the valley of the Sidu River near Yesanguan in Badong County of the Hubei Province of the People's Republic of China. The bridge was designed by CCSHCC Second Highway Consultants Company Limited, and built at a cost of 720 million yuan (approximately US$100 million). It opened to traffic on November 15, 2009.

== Geography ==
The bridge is part of the east-west G50 Huyu Expressway that parallels China National Highway 318, also an east-west route between Shanghai and Chongqing, crossing the wide belt of mountains that separate the Sichuan Basin from the lowlands of eastern Hubei. The Yangtze River pierces the same mountain belt 50 km (31 mi) to the north, forming the famous Three Gorges. The Yiwan Railway, completed in 2010 and running parallel to the highway, has been described as China's most difficult to build and most expensive (per km) rail line.

The bridge spans a 500-meter-deep (1,600 ft) valley of the Sidu River (a left tributary of the Qingjiang River), and superseded the Royal Gorge Bridge and the Beipan River Guanxing Highway Bridge as the highest bridge in the world until it in turn was surpassed by the Duge Bridge in 2016.

== Design and construction ==
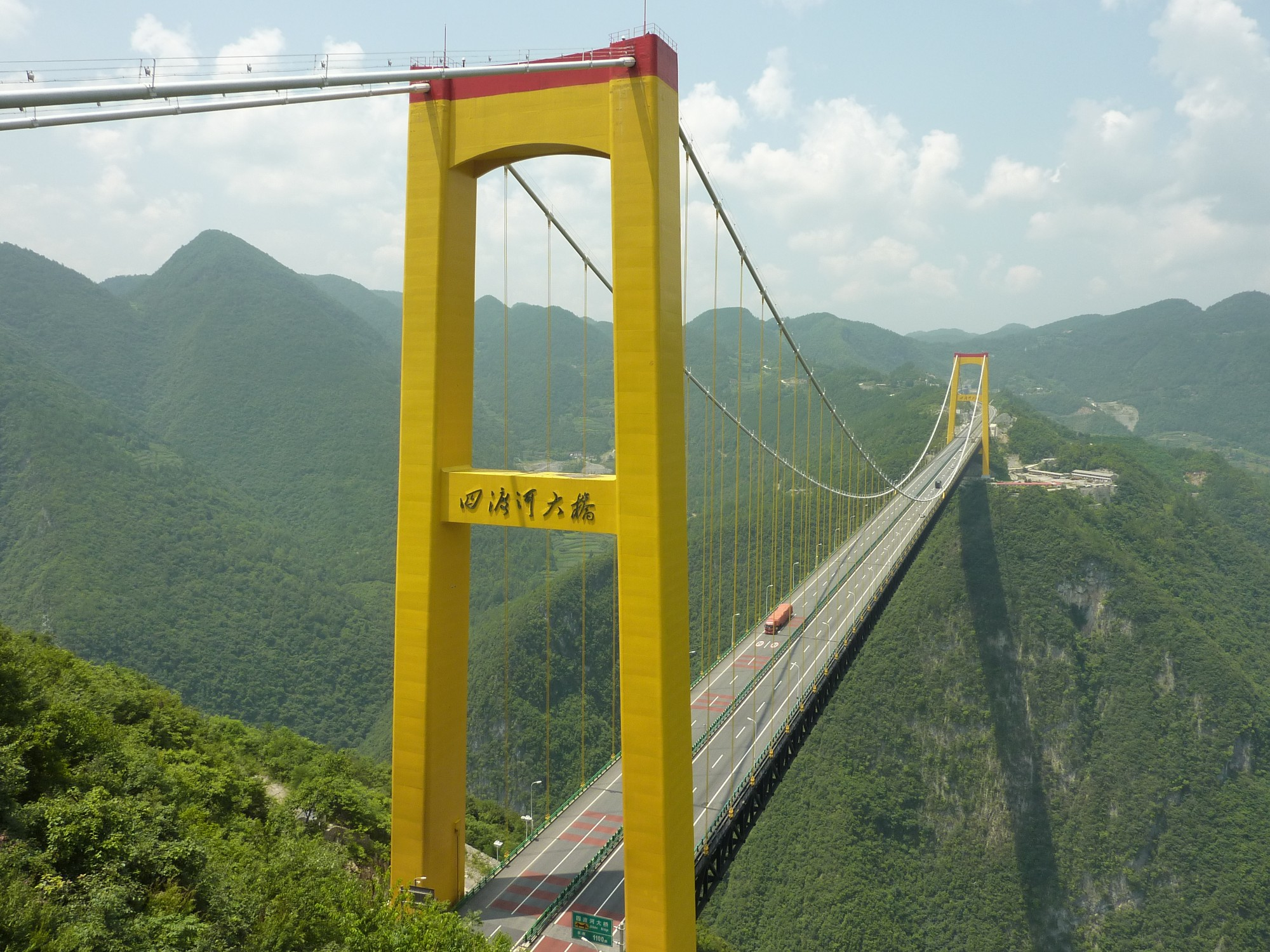
Another view of the Sidu River Bridge

The bridge's design includes H-shaped towers, a truss-stiffened main span, and unsuspended side spans. The Warren-type trusses were constructed in 71 sections with the largest section weighing 91.6 metric tons (101.0 short tons). The trusses are 6.5 m (21 ft) tall and 26 meters (85 ft) wide.

The height measurement from the bottom of the gorge has been reported as 496 m (1,627 ft) by Eric Sakowski, 500 m (1,600 ft) by Chongxu Wang, and 550 m (1,800 ft) by Yinbo Liu.

The first part of the suspension cable installed, a rope known as the pilot cable, was the first-ever to be placed using a military rocket. Conditions at the bridge's location would not allow the use of boats or helicopters, which have previously been used to string the first cable. The rockets carried the pilot cables made of Nylon 66, a highly elastic yarn known locally as Chinlon for Chinese Nylon, across the canyon on October 6, 2006 and resulted in time and cost savings.

The main suspension cables are made of 127 parallel wire strands bundled into a hexagonal shape (127 is the sixth centred hexagonal number). Each strand is made of 127 wires (also making a hexagonal shape so that there is a total of 16,129 wires in each of the two main suspension cables). Each cable can hold 191,960 kilonewtons (43,150,000 lb_{f}).
