= G7612 Nayong–Xingyi Expressway =

Road in China

Nayong–Xingyi Expressway
- 纳雍－兴义高速公路
- Naxing Expressway 纳兴高速公路

Route information
- Auxiliary route of G76

Major junctions
- North end: G76 in Nayong County, Bijie, Guizhou
- South end: G78 in Xingyi County, Qianxinan Buyei and Miao, Guizhou

Location
- Country: China

Highway system
- National Trunk Highway System; Primary; Auxiliary; National Highways; Transport in China
← G7611	→ G78

The G7612 Nayong–Xingyi Expressway (Chinese: 纳雍至兴义高速公路), also referred to as the Naxing Expressway (Chinese: 纳兴高速公路), is an expressway in Guizhou, China that connects Nayong County to Xingyi County.

== Route ==
The expressway begins in Nayong County, Bijie, before it continues through Zhijin County, Liuzhi Special District, Shuicheng District, Qinglong County, Pu'an County, Qinglong County and Xingren, before terminating in Xingyi County, Qianxinan Buyei and Miao Autonomous Prefecture.
