= Xiuwen County =

Xiuwen County 修文县
- County
- Location of the seat in Guizhou Xiuwen (Southwest China)
- Coordinates (Xiuwen County government): 26°50′20″N 106°35′31″E
- Country: China
- Province: Guizhou
- Prefecture-level city: Guiyang
- County seat: Longchang

Area
  - Total: 1,076 km^{2} (415 sq mi)

Population (2010)
  - Total: 248,955
  - Density: 231.4/km^{2} (599.2/sq mi)
- Time zone: UTC+8 (China Standard)

Xiuwen County (simplified Chinese: 修文县; traditional Chinese: 修文縣; pinyin: Xiūwén Xiàn) is a county in central Guizhou province, China. It is under the administration of the prefecture-level city of Guiyang, the provincial capital, and lies to the north of Guiyang's urban area.

== Administrative divisions ==
Xiuwen County comprises 5 subdistricts, 6 towns and 1 ethnic township:

subdistricts

- Longchang Subdistrict 龙场街道
- Yangmingdong Subdistrict 阳明洞街道
- Jingyang Subdistrict 景阳街道
- Zhazuo Subdistrict 扎佐街道
- Jiuchang Subdistrict 久长街道

towns

- Liuguang Town 六广镇
- Liutun Town 六屯镇
- Saping Town 洒坪镇
- Liutong Town 六桶镇
- Gubao Town 谷堡镇
- Xiaoqing Town 小箐镇

ethnic township

- Dashi Bouyei Ethnic Township 大石布依族乡

== Climate ==
Climate data for Xiuwen, elevation 1,297 m (4,255 ft), (1991–2020 normals, extremes 1981–2010)
Month	Jan	Feb	Mar	Apr	May	Jun	Jul	Aug	Sep	Oct	Nov	Dec	Year
Record high °C (°F)	22.5 (72.5)	29.5 (85.1)	31.1 (88.0)	32.0 (89.6)	32.8 (91.0)	32.2 (90.0)	33.5 (92.3)	33.5 (92.3)	33.5 (92.3)	29.6 (85.3)	25.6 (78.1)	23.1 (73.6)	33.5 (92.3)
Mean daily maximum °C (°F)	6.9 (44.4)	10.3 (50.5)	14.7 (58.5)	20.0 (68.0)	23.0 (73.4)	24.9 (76.8)	27.1 (80.8)	27.2 (81.0)	24.1 (75.4)	18.8 (65.8)	14.8 (58.6)	9.2 (48.6)	18.4 (65.2)
Daily mean °C (°F)	3.5 (38.3)	6.0 (42.8)	9.9 (49.8)	14.9 (58.8)	18.2 (64.8)	20.8 (69.4)	22.6 (72.7)	22.2 (72.0)	19.2 (66.6)	14.7 (58.5)	10.5 (50.9)	5.4 (41.7)	14.0 (57.2)
Mean daily minimum °C (°F)	1.2 (34.2)	3.2 (37.8)	6.7 (44.1)	11.3 (52.3)	14.8 (58.6)	17.8 (64.0)	19.4 (66.9)	18.7 (65.7)	15.7 (60.3)	12.0 (53.6)	7.5 (45.5)	2.7 (36.9)	10.9 (51.7)
Record low °C (°F)	−5.9 (21.4)	−6.8 (19.8)	−4.9 (23.2)	0.2 (32.4)	5.4 (41.7)	9.8 (49.6)	9.6 (49.3)	11.4 (52.5)	5.7 (42.3)	0.9 (33.6)	−4.5 (23.9)	−7.3 (18.9)	−7.3 (18.9)
Average precipitation mm (inches)	28.7 (1.13)	24.3 (0.96)	40.8 (1.61)	81.0 (3.19)	161.9 (6.37)	212.1 (8.35)	208.2 (8.20)	123.2 (4.85)	90.1 (3.55)	95.4 (3.76)	38.1 (1.50)	21.7 (0.85)	1,125.5 (44.32)
Average precipitation days (≥ 0.1 mm)	17.6	15.2	17.4	17.3	18.0	18.5	15.2	12.6	12.2	16.9	13.0	14.4	188.3
Average snowy days	6.9	3.3	0.6	0	0	0	0	0	0	0	0.3	2.8	13.9
Average relative humidity (%)	86	83	82	80	80	83	81	80	81	84	83	83	82
Mean monthly sunshine hours	37.3	55.5	81.7	110.5	121.0	103.4	165.1	173.9	128.3	77.7	76.5	51.7	1,182.6
Percentage possible sunshine	11	17	22	29	29	25	39	43	35	22	24	16	26
Source: China Meteorological Administration
