= G6911 Ankang–Laifeng Expressway =

Road in China

Ankang–Laifeng Expressway
- 安康－来风高速公路
- Anlai Expressway 安来高速公路

Route information
- Auxiliary route of G69

Major junctions
- North end: G4213 in Pingli County, Ankang, Shaanxi
- South end: Hunan S99 in Laifeng County, Enshi Tujia and Miao, Hubei

Location
- Country: China

Highway system
- National Trunk Highway System; Primary; Auxiliary; National Highways; Transport in China
← G69	→ G70

The G6911 Ankang–Laifeng Expressway (Chinese: 安康—来凤高速公路), also referred to as the Anlai Expressway (Chinese: 安来高速公路), is an expressway in China that connects the cities of Ankang, Shaanxi and Laifeng, Hubei.

== Route ==
=== Shaanxi ===
The Shaanxi section is divided into the Pingzhen Expressway, which opened on 28 August 2020, and the Wuzhen Expressway, which opened on 4 December 2023.

=== Chongqing ===
The Fengxi Expressway is an expressway that starts from Fengjie County and ends in Wuxi County with a total length of 46.4 kilometers. The expressway was built by the China Communications Construction Company, costing a total of 5.438 billion yuan, and was opened to traffic on 30 December 2013.

=== Hubei ===
Map of the Anlai Expressway in Hubei

The route in Hubei travels via Enshi City before terminating in Laifeng County.
