= Gulin County =

Gulin County 古蔺县
- County
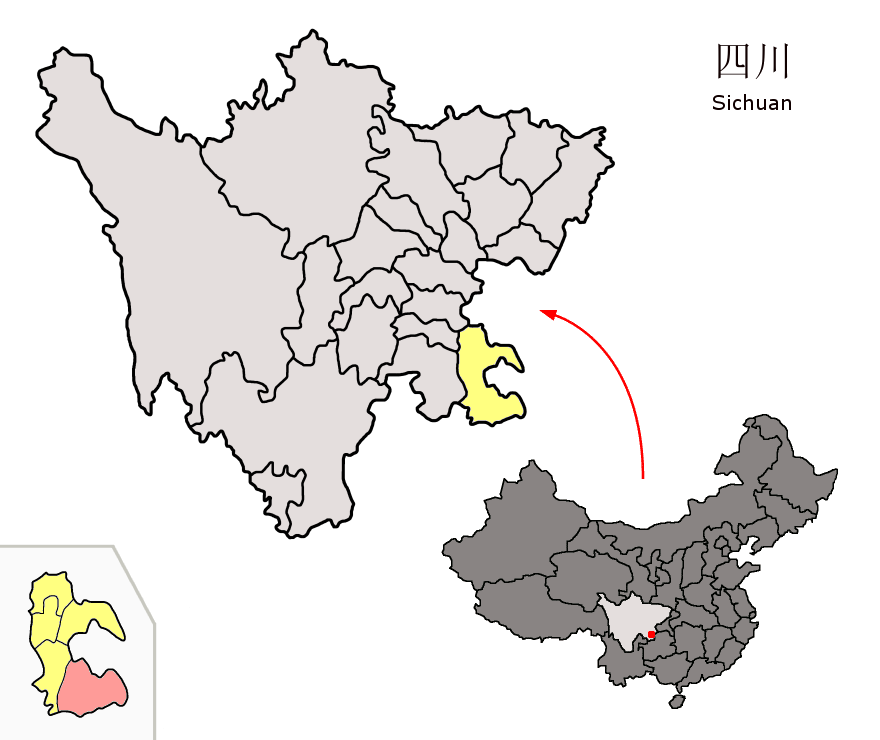
- Location of Gulin in Sichuan

- Location of the seat in Sichuan
- Coordinates: 28.039°N 105.813°E
- Country: China
- Province: Sichuan
- Prefecture-level city: Luzhou

Area
  - Total: 3,184 km^{2} (1,229 sq mi)

Population (2020)
  - Total: 651,958
  - Density: 204.8/km^{2} (530.3/sq mi)
- Time zone: UTC+8 (China Standard)

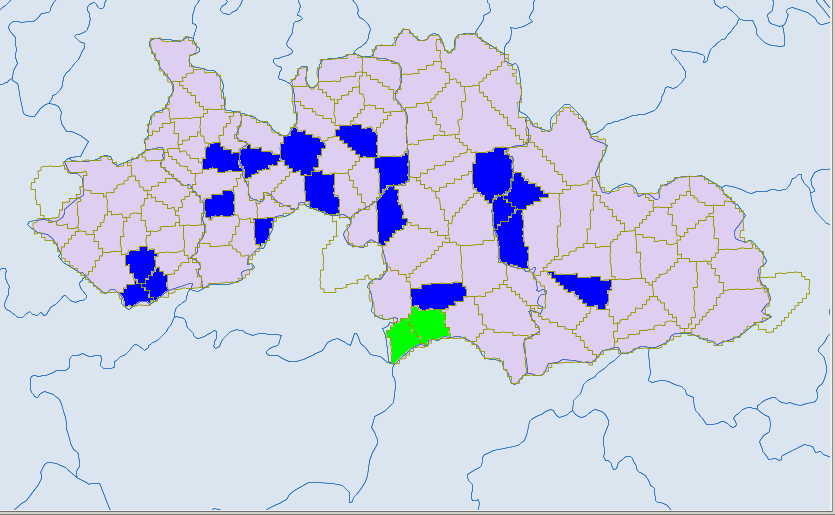
Ethnic townships in South Sichuan: Yibin and Luzhou. Light green -Yi. Blue - miao.

Gulin County (simplified Chinese: 古蔺县; traditional Chinese: 古藺縣; pinyin: Gǔlìn Xiàn) is a county in the south of Sichuan Province, China, bordering Guizhou province to the north, south, and east. It is under the administration of Luzhou city. The county covers 3,184 km^{2} (1,229 sq mi) with a population of 651,958 in 2020.

== Administrative divisions ==
Gulin County comprises 3 subdistricts, 17 towns and 3 ethnic townships:

subdistricts

- Zhangde Subdistrict (彰德街道)
- Jinlan Subdistrict (金兰街道)
- Yongle Subdistrict (永乐街道)

towns

- Longshan Town (龙山镇)
- Taiping Town (太平镇)
- Erlang Town (二郎镇)
- Dacun Town (大村镇)
- Shibao Town (石宝镇)
- Dangui Town (丹桂镇)
- Maoxi Town (茅溪镇)
- Guanwen Town (观文镇)
- Shuangsha Town (双沙镇)
- Deyao Town (德耀镇)
- Shiping Town (石屏镇)
- Huanghua Town (皇华镇)
- Dongxin Town (东新镇)
- Jiaoyuan Town (椒园镇)
- Mati Town (马蹄镇)
- Huangjing Town (黄荆镇)
- Baini Town (白泥镇)

ethnic townships

- Masi Miao Ethnic Township (马嘶苗族乡, Yangl sib hmongb Xiangb)
- Jianzhu Miao Ethnic Township (箭竹苗族乡)
- Dazhai Miao Ethnic Township (大寨苗族乡)

== Climate ==
Climate data for Gulin, elevation 538 m (1,765 ft), (1991–2020 normals, extremes 1991–present)
Month	Jan	Feb	Mar	Apr	May	Jun	Jul	Aug	Sep	Oct	Nov	Dec	Year
Record high °C (°F)	24.4 (75.9)	26.7 (80.1)	35.9 (96.6)	37.7 (99.9)	40.7 (105.3)	40.5 (104.9)	42.6 (108.7)	42.8 (109.0)	41.9 (107.4)	36.2 (97.2)	35.7 (96.3)	21.1 (70.0)	42.8 (109.0)
Mean daily maximum °C (°F)	10.1 (50.2)	13.3 (55.9)	18.5 (65.3)	24.2 (75.6)	27.6 (81.7)	29.4 (84.9)	33.1 (91.6)	33.3 (91.9)	28.6 (83.5)	21.9 (71.4)	17.6 (63.7)	11.7 (53.1)	22.4 (72.4)
Daily mean °C (°F)	7.3 (45.1)	9.6 (49.3)	13.8 (56.8)	18.6 (65.5)	22.0 (71.6)	24.3 (75.7)	27.0 (80.6)	26.8 (80.2)	23.1 (73.6)	18.0 (64.4)	13.8 (56.8)	8.8 (47.8)	17.8 (63.9)
Mean daily minimum °C (°F)	5.4 (41.7)	7.2 (45.0)	10.7 (51.3)	14.9 (58.8)	18.0 (64.4)	20.8 (69.4)	22.8 (73.0)	22.5 (72.5)	19.6 (67.3)	15.7 (60.3)	11.3 (52.3)	6.8 (44.2)	14.6 (58.4)
Record low °C (°F)	−1.9 (28.6)	−1.6 (29.1)	1.3 (34.3)	5.8 (42.4)	8.8 (47.8)	14.0 (57.2)	16.6 (61.9)	16.8 (62.2)	12.1 (53.8)	6.8 (44.2)	0.4 (32.7)	−1.7 (28.9)	−1.9 (28.6)
Average precipitation mm (inches)	13.8 (0.54)	13.5 (0.53)	25.9 (1.02)	54.5 (2.15)	83.1 (3.27)	147.5 (5.81)	129.9 (5.11)	113.6 (4.47)	81.4 (3.20)	55.5 (2.19)	22.3 (0.88)	11.7 (0.46)	752.7 (29.63)
Average precipitation days (≥ 0.1 mm)	12.4	10.3	11.4	12.8	15.0	16.4	13.1	12.3	12.3	15.7	9.9	10.3	151.9
Average snowy days	0.8	0.2	0	0	0	0	0	0	0	0	0	0.1	1.1
Average relative humidity (%)	80	77	74	73	72	78	75	73	77	83	80	80	77
Mean monthly sunshine hours	30.3	47.1	80.7	110.0	120.7	103.9	186.0	188.9	122.1	60.0	61.1	36.6	1,147.4
Percentage possible sunshine	9	15	22	28	29	25	44	47	33	17	19	11	25
Source: China Meteorological Administration all-time January high
