= List of major power stations in Guizhou =

This article lists the major power stations located in Guizhou province.

== Non-renewable ==
=== Coal-based ===
Station	Name in Chinese	Coordinates	Capacity (MW)	Operational units	Under construction units
Pannan Power Station	盘南电厂	25°28′08″N 104°35′30″E	3,720	4×600MW, 2×660MW	
Faer Power Station	发耳电厂	26°19′31″N 104°46′11″E	2,400	4×600MW	
Qianxi Power Station	黔西电厂	27°03′07″N 106°07′28″E	1,860	4×300MW, 1×660MW	
Yuanhao Power Station	元豪电厂	25°11′55″N 105°01′55″E	1,400	4×350MW	
Fuquan Power Station	福泉电厂	26°37′49″N 107°32′35″E	1,320	2×660MW	
Zhijin Power Station	织金电厂	26°49′57″N 105°49′10″E	1,320	2×660MW	
Erlang Power Station	二郎电厂	28°09′48″N 106°21′07″E	1,320	2×660MW	
Liuzhi Power Station	六枝电厂	26°23′06″N 105°23′38″E	1,320	2×660MW	
Puan Power Station	普安电厂	25°31′28″N 104°58′30″E	1,320	2×660MW	
Qianbei Chayuan Power Station	黔北茶园电厂	27°29′34″N 106°26′59″E	1,320	2×660MW	
Weihe Power Station	威赫电厂	27°13′06″N 104°38′52″E	1,320		2×660MW
Panjiang Xinguang Power Station	盘江新光电厂	25°23′29″N 104°39′09″E	1,320	2×660MW	
Shuicheng Power Station	水城电厂		1,320	2×660MW	
Liutang Power Station	金元金沙柳塘电厂		1,320		2×660MW
Panjiang Puding Power Station	盘江普定电厂	26°13′15″N 105°39′50″E	1,320	2×660MW	
Qixingguan Power Station	七星关电厂		1,320		2×660MW
Dawan Power Station	大湾电厂		1,320	2×660MW	
Yaxi Power Station	鸭溪电厂	27°34′44″N 106°39′16″E	1,200	4×300MW	
Qianbei Power Station	黔北电厂	27°28′30″N 106°15′20″E	1,200	4×300MW	
Nayong First Power Station	纳雍第一电厂	26°39′10″N 105°10′58″E	1,200	4×300MW	
Nayong Second Power Station	纳雍第二电厂	26°35′53″N 105°12′09″E	1,200	4×300MW	
Anshun Power Station	安顺电厂	26°13′12″N 105°41′12″E	1,200	4×300MW	
Dafang Power Station	大方电厂	27°05′50″N 105°33′42″E	1,200	4×300MW	
Tangzhai Power Station	塘寨电厂	26°49′46″N 106°15′57″E	1,200	2×600MW	
Xingyi Power Station	兴义电厂	25°15′37″N 104°51′21″E	1,200	2×600MW	
Tongzi Power Station	桐梓电厂	28°07′47″N 106°50′48″E	1,200	2×600MW	
Qingshuihe Power Station	清水河电厂	25°16′49″N 104°52′03″E	700	2×350MW	
Zhenfeng Power Station	贞丰县煤电冶一体化工业园热电联产	25°22′51″N 105°46′46″E	700	2×350MW	
Shuicheng Power Station	水城电厂	26°40′46″N 104°48′19″E	600	3×200MW	
Dalong Power Station	大龙电厂	27°17′43″N 109°00′50″E	600	2×300MW	
Xishui Power Station	习水电厂	28°21′24″N 106°11′53″E	540	4×135MW	

== Renewable ==
=== Hydroelectric ===
==== Conventional ====
Station	Name in Chinese	Coordinates	River	Total capacity (MW)	Dam height (meters)	Status	Units
Shatuo Hydro Power Station	沙沱水电站	28°29′53″N 108°28′31″E	Wu River	1,120	101	Operational	4×280MW
Silin Hydro Power Station	思林水电站	27°48′04″N 108°11′18″E	Wu River	1,050	117	Operational	4×262.5MW
Goupitan Hydro Power Station	构皮滩水电站	27°22′30″N 107°38′02″E	Wu River	3,000	232.5	Operational	5×600MW
Wujiangdu Hydro Power Station	乌江渡水电站	27°19′11″N 106°45′39″E	Wu River	1,130	165	Operational	3×210MW, 2×250MW
Suofengyin Hydro Power Station	索风营水电站	26°58′09″N 106°22′21″E	Wu River	600	121.8	Operational	3×200MW
Dongfeng Hydro Power Station	东风水电站	26°51′20″N 106°09′19″E	Wu River	570	162	Operational	3×190MW
Yingzidu Hydro Power Station	引子渡水电站	26°35′01″N 106°08′16″E	Sancha River	360	134.5	Operational	3×120MW
Hongjiadu Hydro Power Station	洪家渡水电站	26°52′15″N 105°51′16″E	Liuchong River	600	179.5	Operational	3×200MW
Sanbanxi Hydro Power Station	三板溪水电站	26°36′21″N 109°02′57″E	Yuan River	1,000	185.5	Operational	4×250MW
Baishi Hydro Power Station	白市水电站	26°57′29″N 109°28′13″E	Yuan River	420	68	Operational	3×140MW
Guangzhao Hydro Power Station	光照水电站	25°57′47″N 105°15′08″E	Beipan River	1,040	200.5	Operational	4×260MW
Dongqing Hydro Power Station	董箐水电站	25°28′19″N 105°46′48″E	Beipan River	880	149.5	Operational	4×220MW
Mamaya Hydro Power Station	马马崖水电站	25°42′16″N 105°31′17″E	Beipan River	540	109	Operational	4×220MW
Lubuge Hydro Power Station	鲁布革水电站	24°51′58″N 104°34′48″E	Beipan River	600	103.8	Operational	4×150MW
Tianshengqiao 1st Hydro Power Station	天生桥一级水电站	24°56′31″N 105°06′23″E	Nanpan River	1,200	178	Operational	4×300MW
Tianshengqiao-II Hydropower Station	天生桥二级水电站	24°57′47″N 105°09′20″E	Nanpan River	1,200	60.7 (run-of-the-river)	Operational	6×220MW
Pingban Hydro Power Station	平班水电站	24°49′07″N 105°29′20″E	Nanpan River	405	62.2	Operational	3×135MW

== See also ==
- List of power stations in China
