= Jiangjiehe Bridge =

Jiangjiehe Bridge 江界河大桥
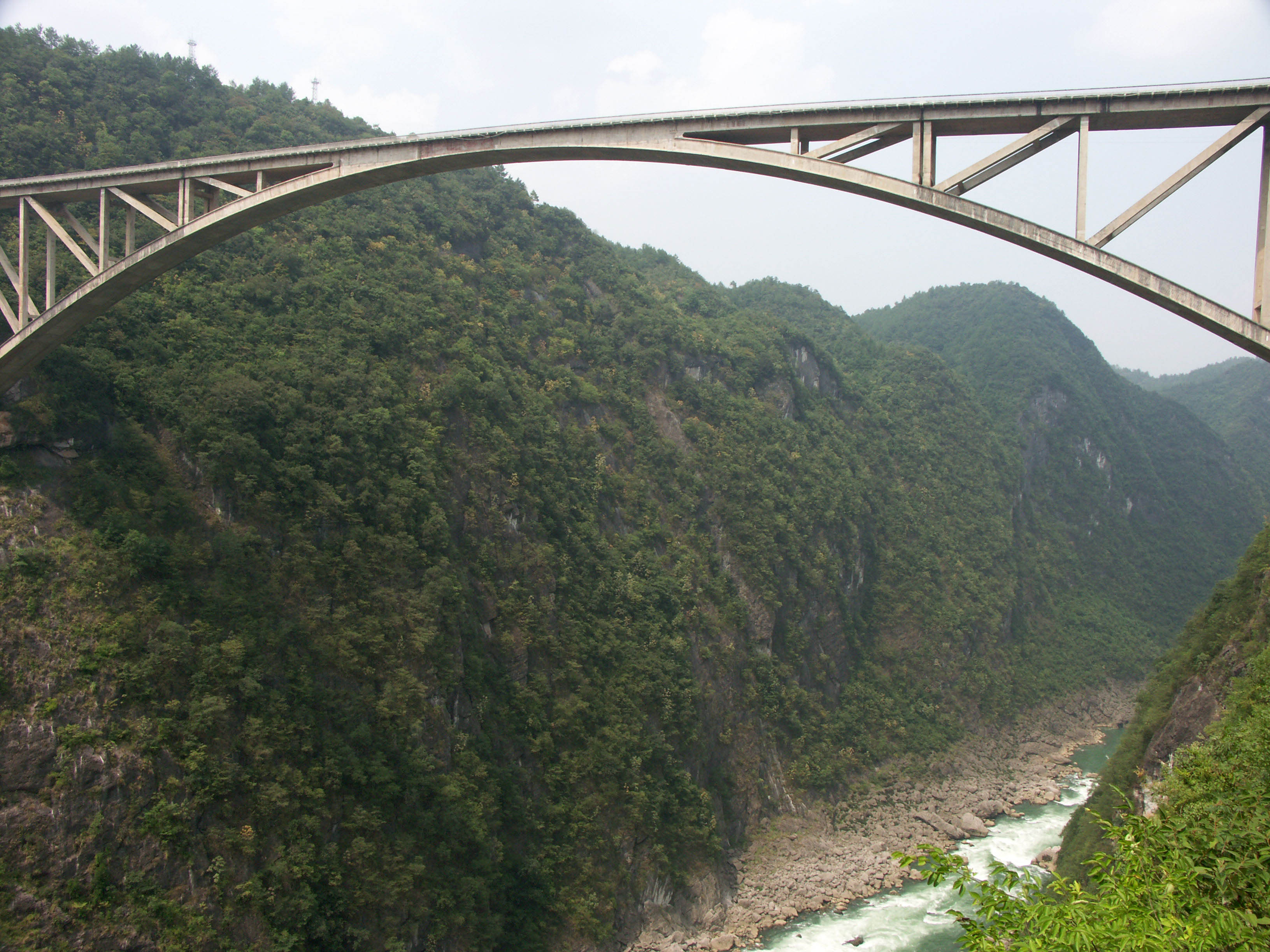
- Coordinates: 27.2989°N 107.3717°E
- Carries: S205 provincial road
- Crosses: Goupitan Reservoir on the Wu River
- Locale: Weng'an, Guizhou, China

Characteristics
- Design: Arch
- Material: Concrete
- Total length: 461 metres (1,512 ft)
- Width: 13.4 metres (44 ft)
- Longest span: 330 metres (1,080 ft)
- Clearance below: 256 metres (840 ft)
- No. of lanes: 2

History
- Construction start: March 1992
- Opened: June 1995

Location
- Interactive map of Jiangjiehe Bridge

The Jiangjiehe Bridge is a concrete arch bridge in Weng'an County, Guizhou, China, spanning 330 metres over the Wu River. At 256 metres high the Jiangjiehe Bridge was the highest bridge in China from 1995 when it opened until 2001 when the 297-metre-high Liuguanghe Bridge was completed. As of 2019, it is among the forty highest bridges in the world. The bridge is located on the provincial S205 road between Weng'an and Honghuagang.

== Goupitan Reservoir ==
The completion of the Goupitan Dam situated 40 km down the river from the bridge site has created a reservoir which extends under the bridge. The true 256 metre drop to the valley floor can now not be seen due to approximately 100 metres of water below the bridge.

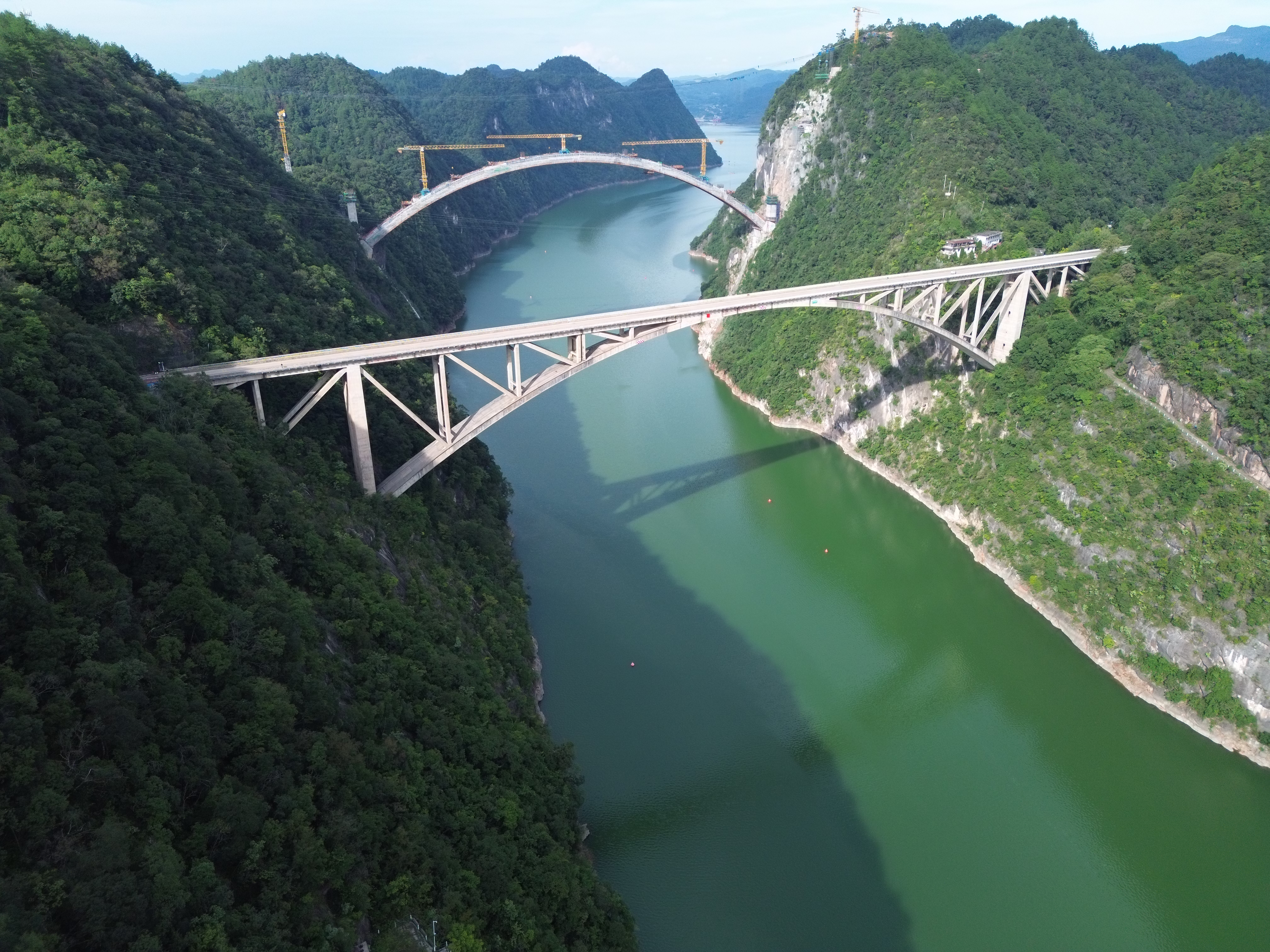
The Jiangjiehe Bridge in September 2025

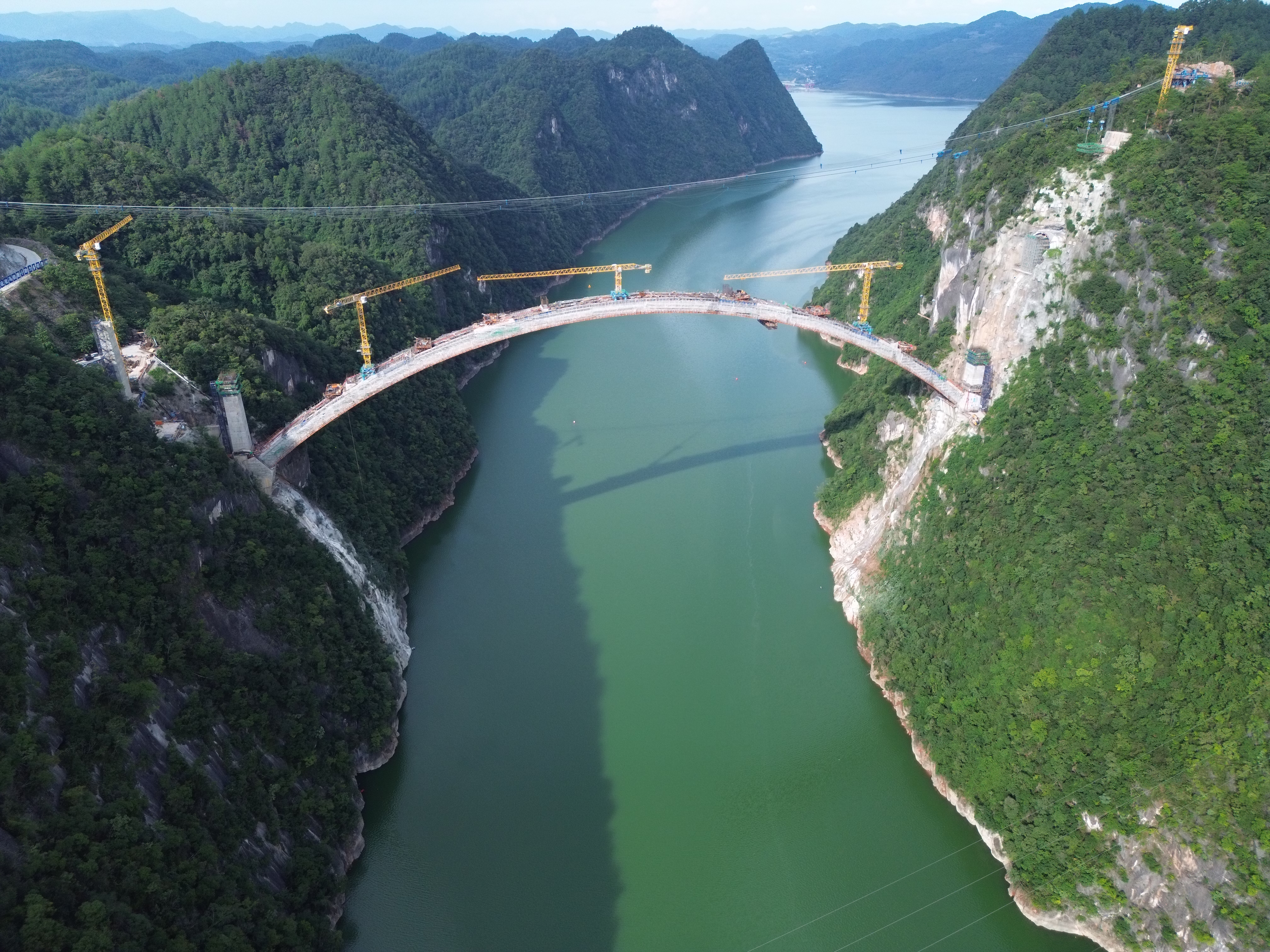
The Jiangjiehe Railway Bridge under construction

== See also ==
- List of bridges in China
- List of highest bridges
- List of longest arch bridge spans
