= Suofengying Dam =

- Location within China
- Country: China
- Location: Guiyang
- Coordinates: 26°58′09″N 106°22′21″E
- Status: Operational
- Construction began: 2002
- Opening date: 2006

Dam and spillways
- Type of dam: Concrete gravity
- Impounds: Wu River
- Height: 121.8 m (400 ft)
- Length: 165 m (541 ft)
- Width (crest): 8 m (26 ft)
- Dam volume: 739,000 m^{3} (966,576 cu yd)

Reservoir
- Total capacity: 201,200,000 m^{3} (163,115 acre⋅ft)
- Catchment area: 21,862 km^{2} (8,441 sq mi)
- Normal elevation: 837 m (2,746 ft)

Power Station
- Commission date: 2005-2006
- Type: Conventional
- Turbines: 3 x 200 MW Francis-type
- Installed capacity: 600 MW

The Suofengying Dam is a concrete gravity dam on the Wu River, 44 km (27 mi) northwest of Guiyang in Guizhou Province, China. It is located 35.5 km (22 mi) downstream of the Dongfeng Dam and 74.9 km (47 mi) upstream of the Wujiangdu Dam. The primary purpose of the dam is hydroelectric power generation and it supports a 600 MW power station. Construction on the dam began on 26 July 2002 and on December 18 of that year, the river was diverted. Pouring of roller-compacted concrete into the dam's body began on 14 January 2004 and in June, the dam began to impound its reservoir. On 18 August, the first generator was operational and the last two in 2005. The 121.8 m (400 ft) tall dam creates a reservoir with a capacity of 201,200,000 m^{3} (163,115 acre⋅ft). The dam's power station is located on its right bank and contains three 200 MW Francis turbine-generators.

== See also ==
- List of dams and reservoirs in China
- List of major power stations in Guizhou
