= Wujiang Bridge Mozhai =

Bridge in southwestern China

Wujiang Bridge Mozhai 磨寨乌江特大桥
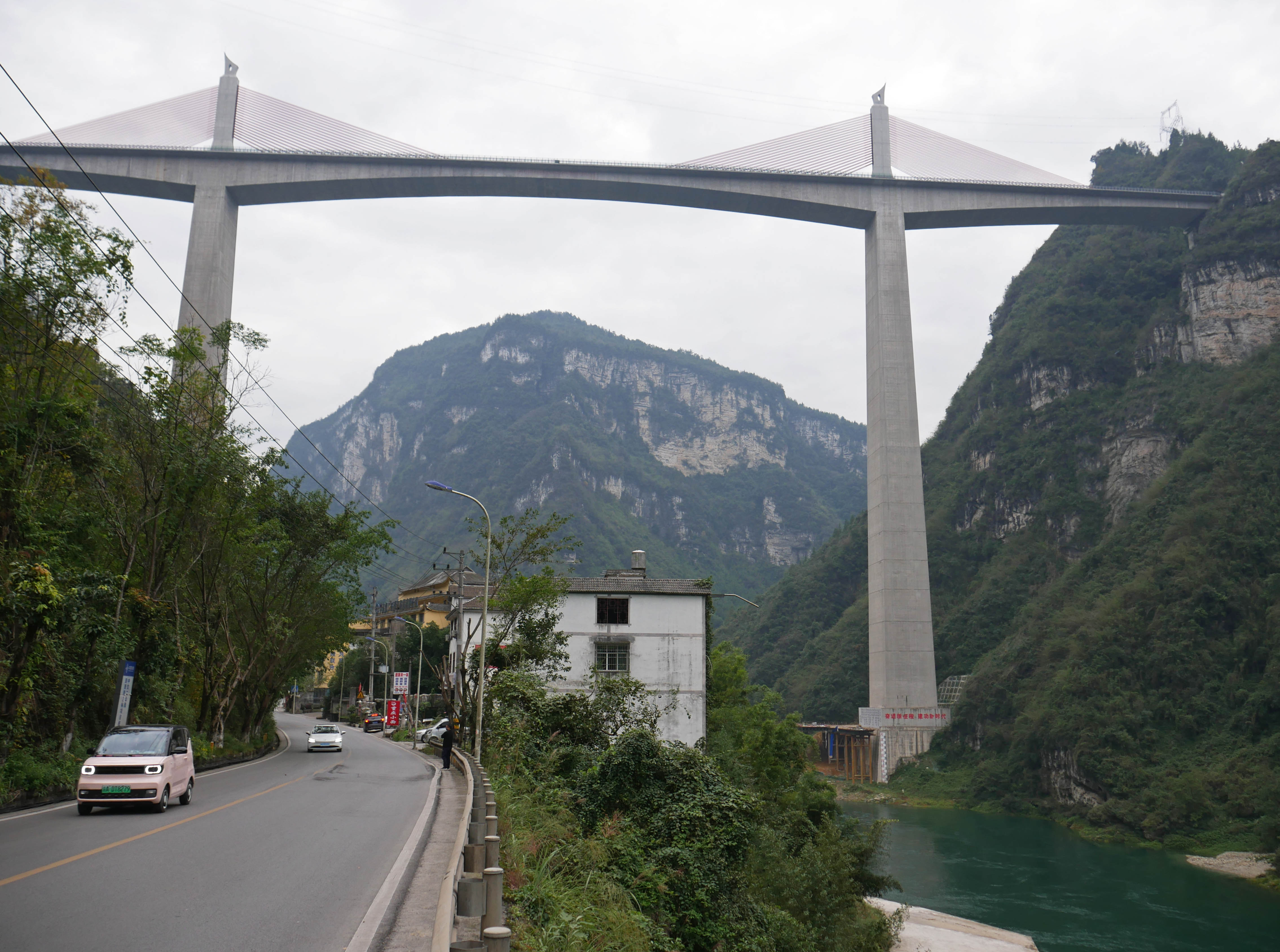
- Coordinates: 29°13′46″N 108°10′24″E
- Carries: S3 Yuxiang Double Line
- Crosses: Wu River (Yangtze tributary)
- Locale: Pengshui County, Chongqing

Characteristics
- Design: Extradosed bridge
- Total length: 708 metres (2,323 ft)
- Height: west tower 287 metres (942 ft)
- Longest span: 296 metres (971 ft)
- Clearance below: 265 metres (869 ft)
- No. of lanes: 4

History
- Construction start: January 18, 2021
- Construction end: June 14, 2024
- Opened: January 2, 2025

Location
- Interactive map of Wujiang Bridge Mozhai

The Wujiang Bridge Mozhai (Chinese: 磨寨乌江特大桥) is a bridge in Pengshui County, Chongqing, China over the Wu River.

With a height of 287 metres (942 ft), the west tower is one of the tallest bridge structure in the world, it is also one of the highest bridge in the world with a deck 265 metres (869 ft) above the river. It was opened to traffic on 2 January 2025.

== See also ==
- List of highest bridges
- List of tallest bridges
- List of longest beam bridge spans
