= Yachi River Bridge =

Yachi Bridge 鸭池河特大桥
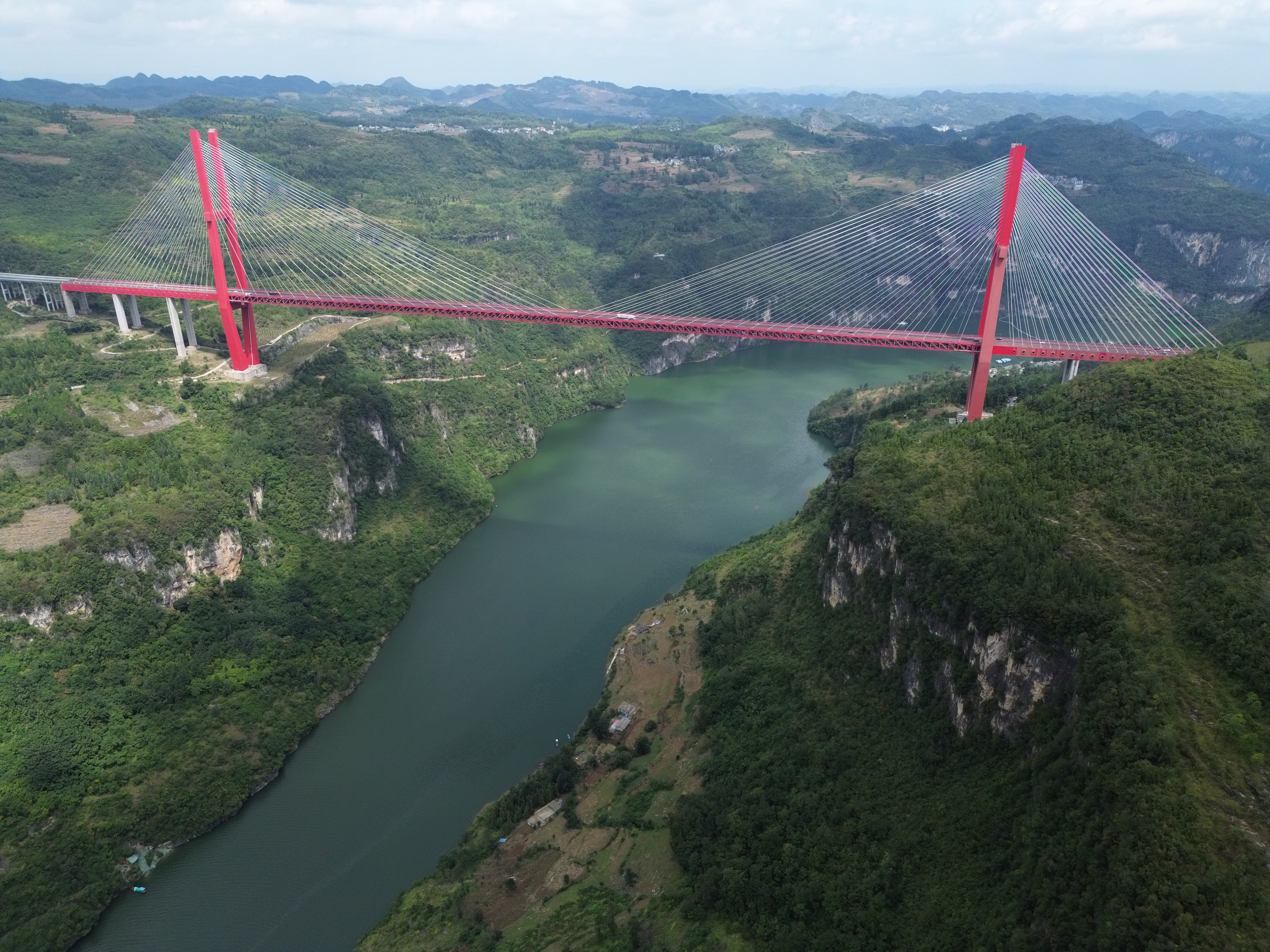
- Coordinates: 26.848078°N 106.136988°E
- Carries: Expressway
- Crosses: Yachi River
- Locale: Guizhou, China

Characteristics
- Design: Cable-stayed
- Material: Steel
- Total length: 1,466.5 m (4,811 ft)
- Width: 27.7 m (91 ft)
- Height: 258.2 m (847 ft) (west tower); 243.2 m (798 ft) (east tower)
- Longest span: 800 m (2,600 ft)
- Clearance above: 306 m (1,004 ft) to reservoir
- Clearance below: 434 m (1,424 ft)

History
- Construction start: September 2013
- Opened: 16 July 2016

Location
- Interactive map of Yachi Bridge

The Yachi River Bridge is a cable-stayed bridge in Guizhou, China. The bridge is the fourth highest in the world and also one of the longest cable-stayed bridges with a main span of 800 m (2,600 ft). The west and east towers are 258.2 m (847 ft) and 243.2 m (798 ft) in height, respectively, placing the bridge among the tallest bridges in the world.

The bridge crosses the Yachi River between Qianxi County in Bijie and Qingzhen in the city of Guiyang along the Qianxi Expressway. The Yachi River Bridge is officially 440 metres high; however, it crosses over the Dongfeng Dam reservoir so it is actually 306 m (1,004 ft) above water level.

== See also ==
- List of bridges in China
- List of longest cable-stayed bridge spans
- List of highest bridges
- List of tallest bridges
