= Xinhua Township, Chongqing =

Xinhua Township 新华乡
- Township
- Location in Chongqing
- Coordinates: 29°19′46″N 108°36′41″E
- Country: People's Republic of China
- Municipality: Chongqing
- District: Qianjiang
- Village-level divisions: 7 villages
- Elevation: 874 m (2,867 ft)
- Time zone: UTC+8 (China Standard)
- Area code: 0023

Xinhua Township (simplified Chinese: 新华乡; traditional Chinese: 新華鄉; pinyin: Xīnhuá Xiāng; lit. 'new China') is a township of western Qianjiang District in southeastern Chongqing Municipality, People's Republic of China, located near the border with Pengshui County to the west and about 27 kilometres (17 mi) southwest of the district seat and 200 km (120 mi) east-southeast of downtown Chongqing as the crow flies. As of 2011, it has seven villages under its administration.

== See also ==
- List of township-level divisions of Chongqing
