= Zhuoshui Fengyu Bridge =

- Crosses: Apeng River
- Locale: Chongqing, China

Characteristics
- Design: Covered bridge
- Total length: 303 m (994 ft)
- No. of spans: 11

History
- Construction start: 1591

The Zhuoshui Fengyu Bridge (Chinese: 濯水风雨廊桥; pinyin: Zhuóshuǐ Fēngyǔ Lángqiáo) is a covered bridge in Qianjiang District of Chongqing, China. A bridge was first built at this spot in 1591 during the Ming dynasty. It has been destroyed several times over the centuries.

In 1999 the bridge was rebuilt. The bridge was known for its traditional pagoda style roof. On 28 November 2013, around 4am, the bridge caught fire and was destroyed. It was unable to be repaired after the fire, so was rebuilt. In July 2017, the bridge was reopened after being rebuilt.
