= Xisha Bridge =

Xisha Bridge 细沙河特大桥
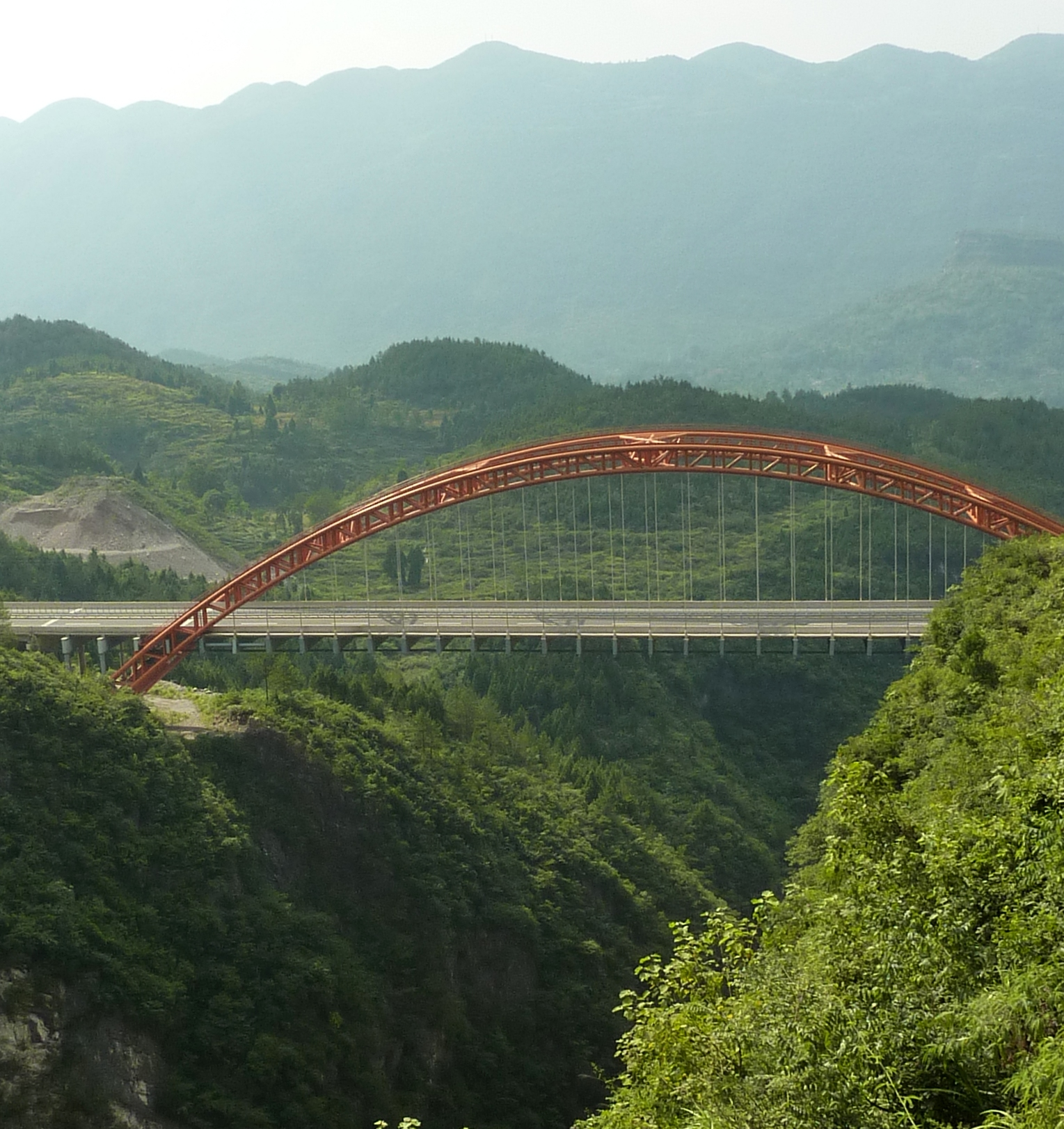
- Coordinates: 29.138237°N 108.755268°E
- Carries: G65 Baotou–Maoming Expressway
- Locale: Qianjiang, Chongqing

Characteristics
- Design: Arch
- Height: 217 metres (712 ft)
- Longest span: 190 metres (620 ft)

History
- Opened: 2010

Location
- Interactive map of Xisha Bridge

Xisha Bridge is a 217-metre (712 ft) high arch bridge near the city of Lianghezhen, Chongqing China. The main ribs are composed of concrete filled steel tubes. The span is the highest through arch in the world. The bridge crosses the Xisha River (Xi Shahe), a tributary of the larger Apeng River (Apengjiang). The bridge is located on G65 Baotou–Maoming Expressway which has several other bridges over 200 metres (660 ft) high including the Aizhai Bridge and the Wulingshan Bridge.

== See also ==
List of highest bridges in the world
