= List of longest beam bridge spans =

This list of the longest beam bridge spans ranks the world's beam bridges by the length of their main span. The length of the main span is the most common way to rank bridges as it usually correlates with the engineering complexity involved in designing and constructing the bridge. The types of beam bridges that allow for the greatest spans are cantilever bridges, continuous truss bridges, steel and concrete box girder bridges. If one bridge has a longer span than another it does not necessarily mean that the bridge is longer from shore to shore or from abutment to abutment.

== Completed bridges ==
This list only includes bridges that carry automobiles or trains, it does not include footbridges or pipeline bridges. The span must be 300 metres (980 ft) or over to be included in the list. Because there is no official classification, some bridges may be missing.

Name	Span meters	Material	Year opened	Location	Country	Ref
Quebec Bridge	549 m (1,800 ft)	Cantilever	1917	Quebec City–Lévis, Quebec; 46°44′44″N 71°17′17″W	Canada	
Forth Bridge	521 m (1,710 ft) ×2	Cantilever	1890	North Queensferry–South Queensferry, Scotland; 55°59′54″N 3°23′15″W	United Kingdom	
Minato Bridge	510 m (1,673 ft)	Cantilever	1973	Osaka, Osaka Prefecture; 34°38′39″N 135°26′15″E	Japan	
Commodore Barry Bridge	501 m (1,644 ft)	Cantilever	1974	Chester, Pennsylvania–Bridgeport, New Jersey; 39°49′32″N 75°22′06″W	United States	
Crescent City Connection	480 m (1,575 ft)	Cantilever	1958; 1988	New Orleans, Louisiana; 29°56′19″N 90°03′27″W	United States	
Sanguantang Bridge	465 m (1,526 ft)	Continuous truss	2020	Ningbo, Zhejiang; 29°54′23″N 121°37′00″E	China	
Howrah Bridge	457 m (1,500 ft)	Cantilever	1943	Kolkata, West Bengal; 22°35′07″N 88°20′49″E	India	
Gramercy Bridge	446 m (1,462 ft)	Cantilever	1995	Gramercy–Wallace, Louisiana; 30°02′45″N 90°40′21″W	United States	
Tokyo Gate Bridge	440 m (1,444 ft)	Cantilever	2012	Koto, Tokyo; 35°36′41″N 139°49′38″E	Japan	
San Francisco–Oakland Bay Bridge; East bay span Dismantled in 2014	427 m (1,400 ft)	Cantilever	1936	San Francisco, California; 37°48′57″N 122°21′16″W	United States	
Ikitsuki Bridge	400 m (1,312 ft)	Continuous truss	1991	Ikitsuki, Nagasaki Prefecture; 33°21′11″N 129°26′17″E	Japan	
Horace Wilkinson Bridge	376 m (1,235 ft)	Cantilever	1968	Baton Rouge–Port Allen, Louisiana; 30°26′22″N 91°11′47″W	United States	
Sfalassà Viaduct	376 m (1,234 ft)	Portal frame	1974	Bagnara Calabra, Calabria; 38°16′17″N 15°48′12″E	Italy	
Astoria–Megler Bridge	376 m (1,232 ft)	Cantilever	1966	Astoria, Oregon–Pacific County, Washington; 46°13′02″N 123°51′46″W	United States	
Tappan Zee Bridge (1955–2017); Dismantled in 2017	369 m (1,212 ft)	Cantilever	1955	Tarrytown–South Nyack, New York; 41°04′12″N 73°53′28″W	United States	
Lewis and Clark Bridge (Columbia River)	366 m (1,200 ft)	Cantilever	1930	Longview, Washington–Rainier, Oregon; 46°06′17″N 122°57′42″W	United States	
Francis Scott Key Bridge (Baltimore); Collapsed in 2024	366 m (1,200 ft)	Continuous truss	1977	Baltimore, Maryland; 39°13′01″N 76°31′42″W	United States	
Queensboro Bridge	360 m (1,181 ft)	Cantilever	1909	New York City; 40°45′25″N 73°57′17″W	United States	
El Ferdan Railway Bridge	340 m (1,115 ft)	Cantilever	2001	Ismailia, Ismailia Governorate; 30°39′25″N 32°20′02″E	Egypt	
Carquinez Bridge; South bridge dismantled in 2007	335 m (1,100 ft) ×2	Cantilever	1927; 1958	Crockett–Vallejo, California; 38°03′39″N 122°13′33″W	United States	
Ironworkers Memorial Second Narrows Crossing	335 m (1,100 ft)	Cantilever	1960	Vancouver, British Columbia; 49°17′45″N 123°01′35″W	Canada	
Jacques Cartier Bridge	334 m (1,096 ft)	Cantilever	1930	Montreal–Longueuil, Quebec; 45°31′15″N 73°32′06″W	Canada	
Hart Bridge	332 m (1,089 ft)	Continuous truss	1967	Jacksonville, Florida; 30°18′54″N 81°37′37″W	United States	
Shibanpo Yangtze River Bridge	330 m (1,083 ft)	Box girder	2006	Chongqing; 29°32′44″N 106°33′36″E	China	
Richmond–San Rafael Bridge	326 m (1,070 ft) ×2	Cantilever	1956	Richmond–San Rafael, California; 37°56′07″N 122°26′52″W	United States	
Oshima Bridge	325 m (1,066 ft)	Continuous truss	1976	Yanai - Suō-Ōshima, Yamaguchi Prefecture; 33°58′N 132°11′E	Japan	
John P. Grace Memorial Bridge; Demolished in 2006	320 m (1,050 ft)	Cantilever	1929	Charleston, South Carolina; 32°48′08″N 79°55′53″W	United States	
Liuzhi Bridge	320 m (1,050 ft)	Box girder	2025	Liuzhi Special District, Guizhou; 26°13′07″N 105°17′22″E	China	
Newburgh–Beacon Bridge	305 m (1,000 ft)	Cantilever	1963; 1980	Newburgh–Beacon, New York; 41°31′09″N 73°59′39″W	United States	
Stolma Bridge	301 m (988 ft)	Box girder	1998	Stolmen–Selbjørn, Hordaland; 59°59′47″N 5°06′12″E	Norway	
Tenmon Bridge	300 m (984 ft)	Continuous truss	1966	Uki, Kumamoto Prefecture; 32°37′N 130°28′E	Japan	
Rio–Niterói Bridge	300 m (984 ft)	Box girder	1974	Rio de Janeiro–Niterói, Southeast Region; 22°52′16″S 43°09′24″W	Brazil	
Kuronoseto Bridge	300 m (984 ft)	Continuous truss	1974	Izumi–Nagashima, Kagoshima Prefecture; 32°06′21″N 130°10′26″E	Japan	
Ganxi Bridge	300 m (984 ft)	Box girder	2022	Guiding County, Guizhou; 26°41′58″N 107°13′28″E	China	

== Extradosed bridges ==
This section ranks the world's largest extradosed bridges, the span must be 250 metres (820 ft) or over to be included in the list. Because there is no official classification, some bridges may be missing.

Name	Span meters	Year opened	Location	Country	Ref
Ningbo Zhongxing Bridge	400 m (1,312 ft)	2020	Ningbo, Zhejiang; 29°53′49″N 121°34′54″E	China	
Liujing Yong River Bridge	320 m (1,050 ft)	2024	Heng County, Guangxi; 22°49′3″N 108°54′29″E	China	
Jiyang Huanghe River Rail-Road Bridge	300 m (984 ft)		Jiyang, Shandong; 36°54′44″N 117°10′37″E	China	
Wujiang Bridge Mozhai	296 m (971 ft)	2024	Pengshui County, Chongqing; 29°13′46″N 108°10′23″E	China	
Luzhou Jinshan Tuojiang Railway Bridge	292 m (958 ft)	2025	Luzhou, Sichuan; 28°55′49″N 105°22′24″E	China	
Fuzhou-Pingtan Railway Wulong River Bridge	288 m (945 ft)	2021	Fuzhou–Minhou County, Fujian; 25°57′41″N 119°23′37″E	China	
Twinkle Kisogawa Bridge	275 m (902 ft) ×3	2001	Kuwana, Mie Prefecture; 35°02′18.5″N 136°44′31.8″E	Japan	
Twinkle Ibigawa Bridge	271 m (889 ft) ×4	2001	Kuwana, Mie; 35°01′43.1″N 136°42′58.1″E	Japan	
Hongxi Bridge	265 m (869 ft)	2020	Taishun County, Zhejiang; 27°33′49″N 119°49′7″E	China	
Jia Yue Bridge	250 m (820 ft)	2010	Luzhou, Sichuan; 29°42′55.1″N 106°31′05.6″E	China	

== See also ==
- List of longest bridges
- List of longest masonry arch bridge spans
- List of longest arch bridge spans
- List of longest suspension bridge spans
- List of longest cable-stayed bridge spans
- List of highest bridges
- List of tallest bridges
- List of spans
