= Liuguanghe Xiqian Expressway Bridge =

Liuguanghe Xiqian Expressway Bridge 息黔高速公路六广河特大桥
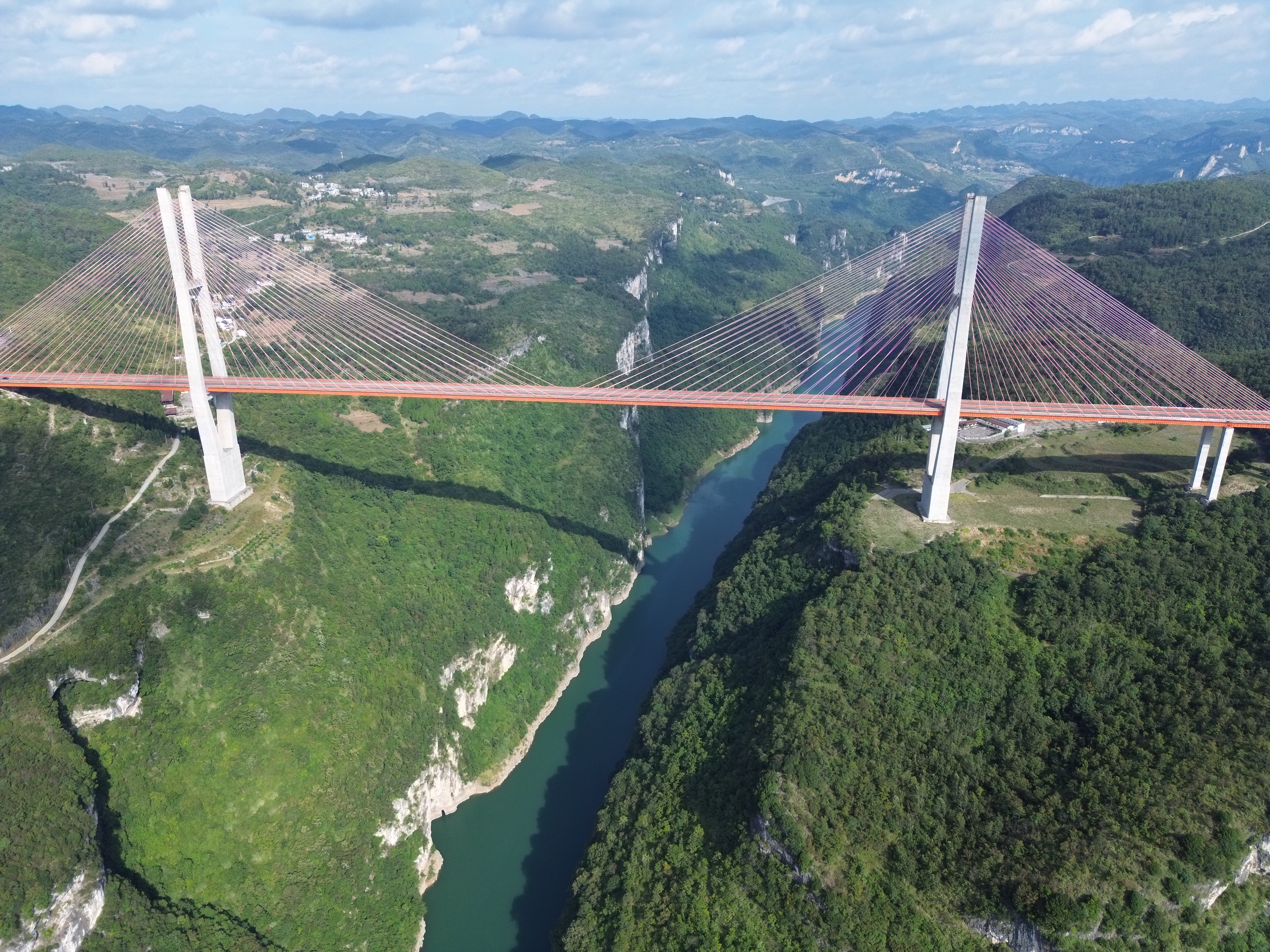
- Coordinates: 27°04′41″N 106°24′06″E
- Carries: S30 Xifeng–Qianxi Expy
- Crosses: Wu River (Yachi)
- Locale: Qianxi–Xiuwen County, Guizhou

Characteristics
- Total length: 1,280 metres (4,200 ft)
- Height: 248 m (814 ft) (west tower); 236 m (774 ft) (east tower)
- Longest span: 580 metres (1,900 ft)
- Clearance above: 375 metres (1,230 ft)

History
- Opened: 2017

Location
- Interactive map of Liuguanghe Xiqian Expressway Bridge

The Liuguanghe Xiqian Expressway Bridge is a 375 metres high cable-stayed bridge crossing the Yachi River between Xiuwen, Guiyang, and Qianxi, Bijie in Guizhou, China.

The Liuguanghe Bridge will carry traffic on the Xifeng to Qianxi Expressway. The bridge will have a main span of 580 metres and a total length of 1280 metres. The highest tower is 248 metres high also making it one of the tallest bridges in the world. Although the bridge is officially 375 metres high, that measurement is taken from the original river level. Construction of the Wujiangdu Dam down stream from the bridge has created a reservoir that extents under the bridge reducing the viable height above the water to 300 metres.

== See also ==
- List of bridges in China
- List of longest cable-stayed bridge spans
- List of highest bridges
- List of tallest bridges
