= Jindong Township, Chongqing =

Jindong Township 金洞乡
- Township
- Location in Chongqing
- Coordinates: 29°12′15″N 108°50′52″E
- Country: People's Republic of China
- Direct-administered municipality: Chongqing
- District: Qianjiang District
- Time zone: UTC+8 (China Standard)

Jindong Township (simplified Chinese: 金洞乡; traditional Chinese: 金洞鄉; pinyin: Jīndòng Xiāng) is a township under the administration of Qianjiang District, Chongqing, China. As of 2020, it administers Yangjia (杨家) Residential Neighborhood and the following five villages:

- Jindong Village
- Yuquan Village (鱼泉村)
- Daya Village (大垭村)
- Zaohua Village (早化村)
- Fengtai Village (凤台村)

== See also ==
- List of township-level divisions of Chongqing
