= Zunyi Bridge =

Zunyi Bridge 遵义乌江大桥
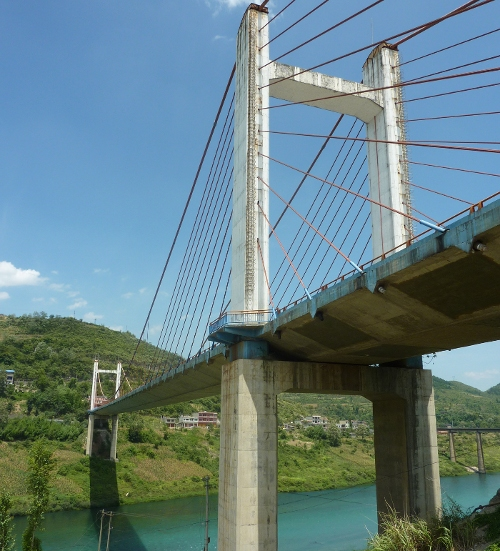
- Coordinates: 27.315667°N 106.790722°E
- Carries: China National Highway 210
- Crosses: Wu River
- Locale: Wujiangzhen, Zunyi County, Guizhou, China

Characteristics
- Design: Hybrid cable-stayed and suspension bridge
- Total length: 461 metres (1,512 ft)
- Longest span: 288 metres (945 ft)

History
- Opened: 1997

Location
- Interactive map of Zunyi Bridge

Zunyi Bridge is a 461-metre-long (1,512 ft) bridge in Wujiangzhen, Zunyi County, Guizhou, China. The bridge forms part of China National Highway 210 between Zunyi and Guiyang. The bridge was opened in 1997 and spans 288 metres (945 ft) over the Wu River. The design is an unusual hybrid of both cable-stayed and suspension bridges.

== See also ==
- Wujiang Viaduct
