= Qianjiang Wulingshan Airport =

Qianjiang Wulingshan Airport 黔江武陵山机场
- IATA: JIQ; ICAO: ZUQJ

Summary
- Airport type: Public
- Serves: Qianjiang, Chongqing
- Location: Zhoubai Subdistrict
- Coordinates: 29°30′42″N 108°50′07″E
- Website: http://www.qjairport.com/

Map
- Location of airport in Chongqing

Runways
Direction	Length		Surface
Direction	m	ft	Surface
03/21	2,400	7,874	Concrete

Statistics (2021)
- Passengers: 364,059
- Aircraft movements: 4,344
- Cargo (metric tons): 710

Qianjiang Wulingshan Airport
- Simplified Chinese: 黔江武陵山机场
- Traditional Chinese: 黔江武陵山機場
Transcriptions
Standard Mandarin
- Hanyu Pinyin: Qiánjiāng Wǔlíngshān Jīchǎng

Qianjiang Wulingshan Airport (IATA: JIQ, ICAO: ZUQJ) is an airport serving Chongqing municipality, China. It is located in the town of Zhoubai and was formerly called Qianjiang Zhoubai Airport, but was renamed in November 2011 after the nearby Wuling Mountains. The airport was opened on November 22, 2010 with a total investment of 600 million yuan. It has a 2,400-meter runway (class 4C).

== Airlines and destinations ==
Airlines	Destinations
Spring Airlines	Kunming, Shanghai–Pudong

== See also ==
- List of airports in China
- List of the busiest airports in China
