= Pengshui Dam =

- Location within China
- Country: China
- Coordinates: 29°12′02″N 108°11′50″E
- Status: In use
- Construction began: 2003
- Opening date: 2008
- Owner: Pengshui Hydropower Company

Dam and spillways
- Type of dam: Arch
- Impounds: Wu River
- Height: 116.5 m (382 ft)
- Length: 325.5 m (1,068 ft)

Reservoir
- Creates: Pengshui Reservoir
- Total capacity: 518,000,000 m^{3} (419,949 acre⋅ft)
- Catchment area: 69,000 km^{2} (26,641 sq mi)

Power Station
- Commission date: 2008-2009
- Type: Conventional
- Turbines: 5 x 350 MW Francis turbines
- Installed capacity: 1,750 MW

The Pengshui Dam is an arch dam on the Wu River in Wulong County, Chongqing, China. The dam provides water to a 1,750 MW hydroelectric power station containing 5 x 350 MW generators. Construction on the dam began in September 2003 and the power plant was operational in 2008.

== See also ==
- List of dams and reservoirs in China
- List of power stations in China
