= HVDC Tian–Guang =

HVDC transmission line in China

Location
- Country: China
- Province: Guangxi, Guangdong
- Coordinates: 24°54′56″N 105°05′47″E; 23°18′58″N 113°15′05″E
- From: Tianshengqiao Hydroelectric Plant
- Passes through: Pingguo, Laibin, Wuzhou, Luodong
- To: Beijiao, Guangzhou
- Runs alongside: existing AC powerline

Ownership information
- Operator: China Southern Power Grid

Construction information
- Substation manufacturer: Siemens
- Commissioned: 2001

Technical information
- Type: overhead transmission line
- Current type: HVDC
- Total length: 960 km (600 mi)
- Capacity: 1,800 MW
- DC voltage: 500 kV
- No. of poles: 2

HVDC Tian–Guang is a bipolar 500 kV HVDC system used for transmitting power generated at Tianshengqiao Hydroelectric Plant to Guangzhou. HVDC Tian–Guan, which was built by Siemens and inaugurated in 2001 is capable of transmitting a maximum power of 1,800 MW.

The terminals are situated at Tianshengqiao Hydroelectric Plant 2 at 24°54′56″N 105°05′47″E and at Beijiao at 23°18′58″N 113°15′05″E near Guangzhou. There is a parallel running AC powerline via Pingguo, Laibin, Wuzhou and Luodong, but the DC line helps damping oscillations and stabilizing the system.
