= Jinxi, Chongqing =

Jinxi 金溪镇
- Town
- Location in Chongqing
- Coordinates: 29°23′42″N 108°41′16″E
- Country: People's Republic of China
- Direct-administered Municipality: Chongqing
- District: Qianjiang District
- Time zone: UTC+8 (China Standard)

Jinxi (Chinese: 金溪; pinyin: Jīnxī) is a town under the administration of Qianjiang District, Chongqing, China. As of 2018, it has one residential community and 7 villages under its administration.

== See also ==
- List of township-level divisions of Chongqing
