= Tianshengqiao-II Dam =

- Location within China
- Official name: Tianshengqiao-II Hydropower Station
- Location: China
- Coordinates: 24°57′47″N 105°09′19″E
- Construction began: 1982
- Opening date: 1997

Dam and spillways
- Type of dam: Embankment, concrete face rock-fill
- Impounds: Nanpan River
- Height: 58.7 m (193 ft)
- Length: 471 m (1,545 ft)
- Dam volume: 4,800,000 m^{3} (6,278,163 cu yd)
- Spillway type: Service, gate controlled

Reservoir
- Creates: Tianshengqiao-II Reservoir
- Total capacity: 26,000,000 m^{3} (21,079 acre⋅ft)

Power Station
- Commission date: 1998
- Turbines: 6 x 220 MW (300,000 hp) Francis turbines
- Installed capacity: 1,320 MW (1,770,000 hp)

The Tianshengqiao-II Dam (locally abbreviated as TSQ-II) is a dam and hydroelectric power station on the Nanpan River in the Anlong and Longlin districts in China. Construction of the dam and power plant began in 1982 and was complete in 1997.

The dam's reservoir is fed by the tailwaters of the Tianshengqiao-I Dam 7 km (4 mi) upstream. The dam diverts water east into three 9.53 km (6 mi) long and 9 m (30 ft) diameter headrace tunnels towards the actual power station 24°56′47″N 105°15′07″E. At the power station, the water powers six 220 megawatts (300,000 hp) Francis turbines for the production of 1,320 MW (1,770,000 hp) of electricity.

== See also ==
- List of conventional hydroelectric power stations
- List of power stations in China
