= Shanling Township =

Shanling Township 杉岭乡
- Township
- Location in Chongqing
- Coordinates: 29°44′18″N 108°37′12″E
- Country: People's Republic of China
- Direct-administered municipality: Chongqing
- District: Qianjiang District
- Time zone: UTC+8 (China Standard)

Shanling Township (simplified Chinese: 杉岭乡; traditional Chinese: 杉岭鄉; pinyin: Shānlǐng Xiāng) is a township in Qianjiang District, Chongqing, China. As of 2020, it administers the following two residential neighborhoods and four villages:

Neighborhoods

- Shanling
- Linfeng (林峰)

Villages

- Fengxiang Village (枫香村)
- Xinglong Village (兴隆村)
- Jianshanzi Village (尖山子村)
- Kuzhu Village (苦竹村)

== See also ==
- List of township-level divisions of Chongqing
