= Wujiang Viaduct =

Wujiang Viaduct 乌江大桥
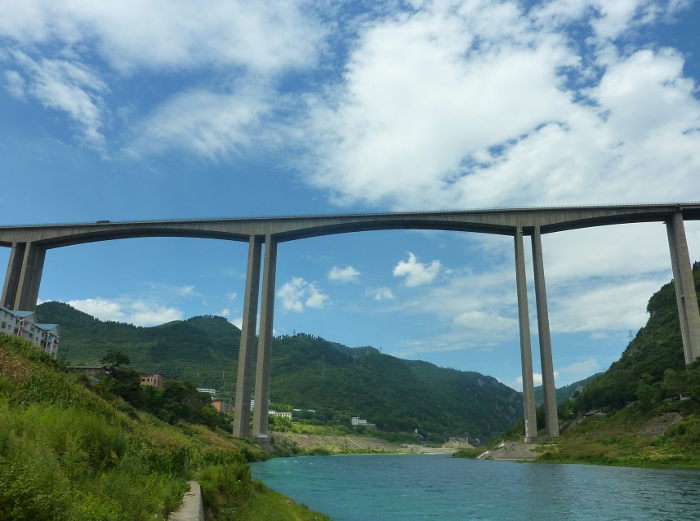
- Coordinates: 27.3125°N 106.77861°E
- Carries: G75 Lanhai Expressway
- Crosses: Wu River
- Locale: Wujiangzhen, Zunyi County, Guizhou, China

Characteristics
- Design: Box girder bridge
- Material: Prestressed concrete
- Total length: 1,452 metres (4,764 ft)
- Longest span: 200 metres (660 ft)
- Clearance below: 173 metres (568 ft)

History
- Opened: 2008

Location
- Interactive map of Wujiang Viaduct

The Wujiang Viaduct is a 1,452 metres (4,764 ft) long viaduct in Wujiangzhen, Zunyi County, Guizhou, China. The bridge was opened in 2008 and has a main span of 200 metres (660 ft) over the Wu River, it is visible from nearly every part of the city. The bridge is 173 metres (568 ft) above the river below and forms part of G75 Lanzhou–Haikou Expressway between Zunyi and Guiyang. Before the viaduct was constructed traffic had to descend into the valley and cross the Zunyi Bridge.

== See also ==
- Zunyi Bridge
- List of tallest bridges in the world
