= Tianshengqiao-I Dam =

- Location within China
- Official name: Tianshengqiao-I Hydropower Station
- Coordinates: 24°56′29″N 105°06′25″E
- Construction began: 1992
- Opening date: 2000

Dam and spillways
- Type of dam: Embankment, concrete face rock-fill
- Impounds: Nanpan River
- Height: 178 m (584 ft)
- Length: 1,104 m (3,622 ft)
- Dam volume: 4,800,000 m^{3} (6,278,163 cu yd)
- Spillway type: Service chute, controlled

Reservoir
- Creates: Tianshengqiao-I Reservoir
- Total capacity: 10,257,000,000 m^{3} (8,315,485 acre⋅ft)
- Catchment area: 50,139 km^{2} (19,359 sq mi)
- Surface area: 173.7 km^{2} (67 sq mi)

Power Station
- Commission date: 1998-2000
- Hydraulic head: 143 m (469 ft) (Gross)
- Turbines: 4 × 300 MW Francis turbines
- Installed capacity: 1,200 MW

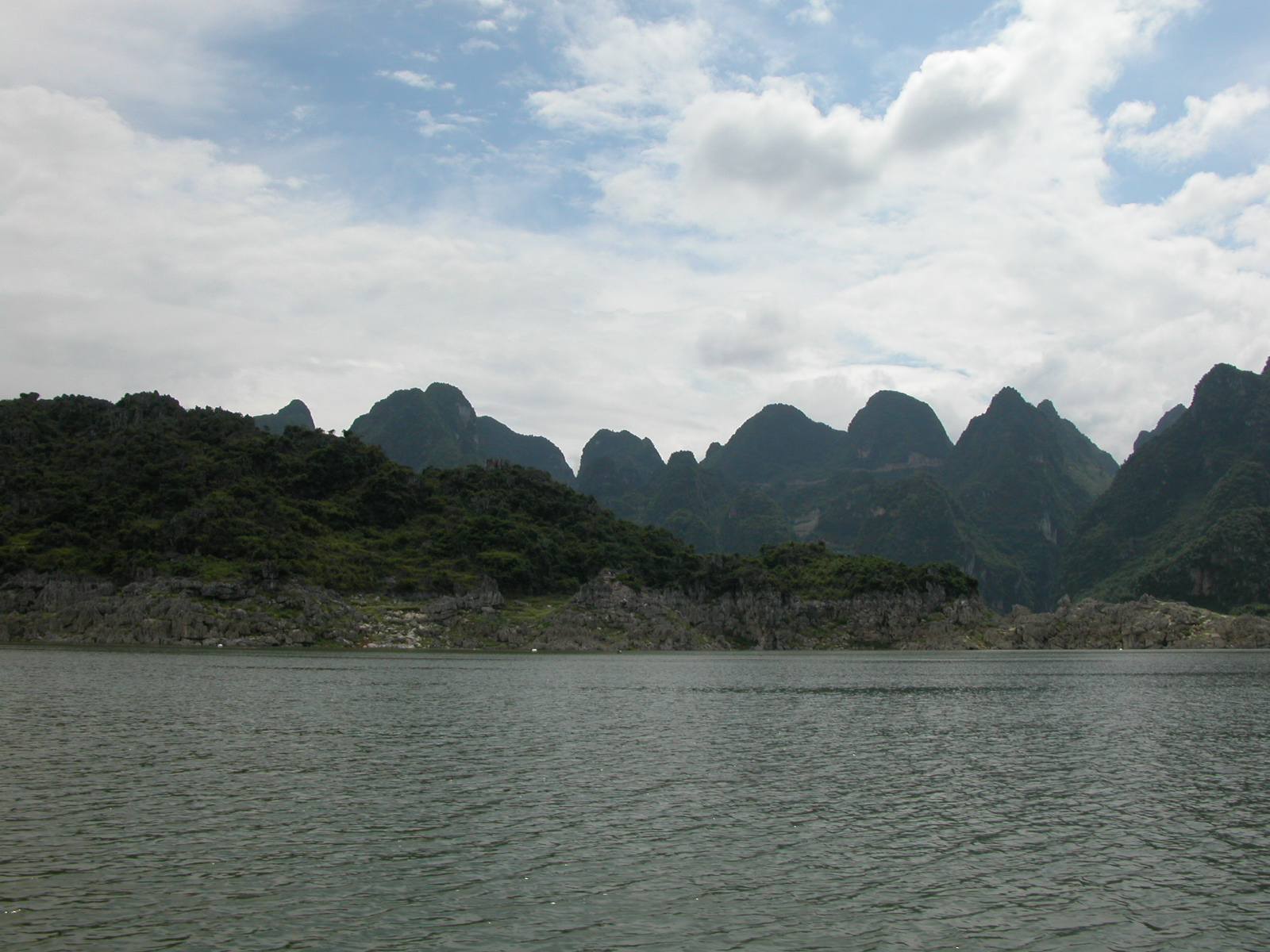
Wanfeng Lake - 2007

The Tianshengqiao-I Dam (locally abbreviated as TSQ-I) is a concrete face rock-fill embankment dam and hydroelectric power station on the Nanpan River straddling the border between Guizhou and Guangxi, People's Republic of China, located in the counties of Anlong and Longlin. The dam is 178 m (584 ft) tall, and was completed in 1998. Water from the dam's reservoir powers four generators with Francis turbines, each with a capacity of 300 MW. Water released from the dam also powers Tianshengqiao-II Dam (TSQ-II) downstream. The power is transmitted to Guangzhou via HVDC Tian-Guang and an AC powerline.

== See also ==
- List of conventional hydroelectric power stations
- List of power stations in China
