= Lubuge Dam =

Dam in Qujing, Yunnan/Guizhou, China

- Location within China
- Country: China
- Location: Lubugexiang, Luoping County, Qujing, Yunnan/Guizhou
- Coordinates: 24°51′58.72″N 104°34′47.47″E
- Purpose: Power
- Status: Operational
- Construction began: 1982
- Opening date: 1988; 38 years ago

Dam and spillways
- Type of dam: Embankment, rock-fill
- Impounds: Huangni River
- Height: 101 m (331 ft)
- Length: 217.2 m (713 ft)
- Width (crest): 10 m (33 ft)
- Spillway capacity: Main: 6,424 m^{3}/s (226,900 cu ft/s); Left bank tunnel: 1,995 m^{3}/s (70,500 cu ft/s); Right bank tunnel: 1,658 m^{3}/s (58,600 cu ft/s)

Reservoir
- Total capacity: 110,000,000 m^{3} (89,000 acre⋅ft)
- Catchment area: 7,300 km^{2} (2,800 mi^{2})
- Normal elevation: 1,130 m (3,710 ft)

Lubuge Hydropower Station
- Coordinates: 24°47′20.20″N 104°32′20.23″E
- Commission date: 1988-1991
- Hydraulic head: 327.7 m (1,075 ft)
- Turbines: 4 x 150 MW Francis-type
- Installed capacity: 600 MW

The Lubuge Dam (Chinese: 鲁布革水电站) is a rock-fill embankment dam on the Huangni River, a tributary of the Nanpan River, located near Lubugexiang in Luoping County on the border of Guizhou and Yunnan Provinces, China. The primary purpose of the dam is hydroelectric power generation and it supports a 600 MW power station. Construction on the project began in 1982 and it was completed in 1991. Funded by the World Bank, it was the first loan offered by the bank to China's power sector.

== Background ==
In June 1981, the Government of the People's Republic of China approved the project. Construction on the dam began in 1982 and the river was diverted on 15 November 1985. On 21 November 1988, the dam began to impound the reservoir and the first generator was commissioned on 27 December 1988. The second was commissioned in 1989 and the third in 1990. The fourth and final generator went online on 14 June 1991. The entire project was complete on 31 December 1991. A US$141.4 million World Bank loan helped fund the dam and power station. It was the first World Bank loan for the power sector in China.

== Design ==
The 101 m (331 ft) rock-fill dam creates a reservoir with a storage capacity of 110,000,000 m^{3} (89,000 acre⋅ft). To control floods, the dam has three spillways. The main is an intake hold behind the dam with a discharge capacity of 6,424 m^{3}/s (226,900 cu ft/s). The second is a tunnel on the left bank of the dam with a capacity of 1,995 m^{3}/s (70,500 cu ft/s). Finally, the third spillway is tunnel on the right back with a capacity of 1,658 m^{3}/s (58,600 cu ft/s). To produce power water is sent to an underground power station downstream through a 9.4 km (5.8 mi) long headrace tunnel. The power station contains four 150 MW Francis turbine-generators for a total installed capacity of 600 MW.

== See also ==
- List of dams and reservoirs in China
- List of tallest dams in China
