= Wulingshan Bridge =

Wulingshan Bridge 武陵山大桥
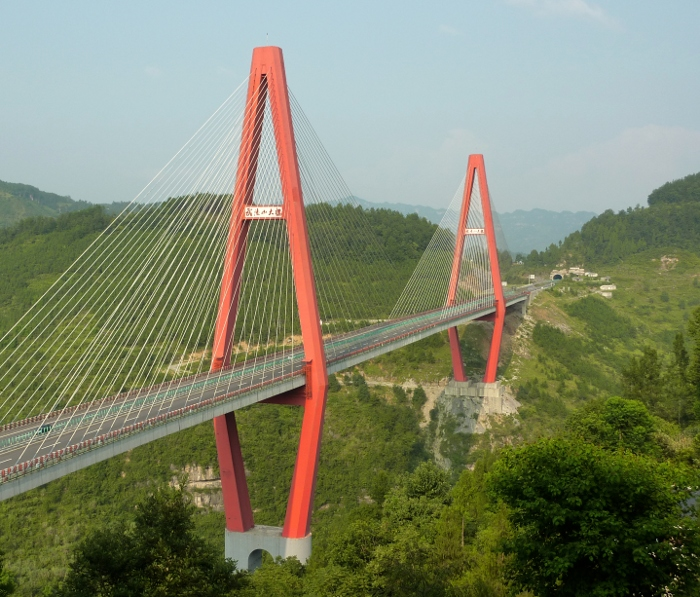
- Coordinates: 29.499098°N 108.50383°E
- Carries: G65 Baotou–Maoming Expressway
- Locale: Pengshui, Chongqing
- Other name: Ganxigou Bridge

Characteristics
- Design: Cable-stayed
- Height: 263 metres (863 ft)
- Longest span: 360 metres (1,180 ft)

History
- Opened: 2009

Location
- Interactive map of Wulingshan Bridge

Wulingshan Bridge is a 263-metre (863 ft) high cable-stayed bridge at Pengshui, Chongqing, China. As of 2012, it is among the forty highest bridges in the world. The bridge is located on G65 Baotou–Maoming Expressway and spans 360 metres (1,180 ft) across the valley of a small tributary stream of the Wu River.

== See also ==
- List of highest bridges in the world
- List of tallest bridges in the world
