= Yinpan Dam =

- Location within China
- Country: China
- Location: Wulong County, Chongqing
- Coordinates: 29°16′23.34″N 107°53′17.03″E
- Purpose: Power, navigation
- Construction began: 2005
- Opening date: 2011; 15 years ago

Dam and spillways
- Type of dam: Gravity
- Impounds: Wu River
- Height: 78.5 m (258 ft)

Reservoir
- Total capacity: 320,000,000 m^{3} (260,000 acre⋅ft)
- Catchment area: 74,910 km^{2} (28,920 mi^{2})

Power Station
- Commission date: 2011
- Type: Conventional
- Turbines: 4 x 150 MW Kaplan-type
- Installed capacity: 600 MW

The Yinpan Dam is a gravity dam on the Wu River in Wulong County of Chongqing Municipality, China. The primary purpose of the dam is hydroelectric power production and navigation. It supports a 500-ton ship lift and a 600 MW power station. Construction on the project began in 2005 and it was completed in 2011 with the first generator commissioned in May of the same year, the fourth in December.

== See also ==
- List of dams and reservoirs in China
- List of tallest dams in China
