= Zhongtang Township =

Zhongtang Township 中塘乡
- Township
- Location in Chongqing
- Coordinates: 29°36′42″N 108°49′33″E
- Country: People's Republic of China
- Direct-administered municipality: Chongqing
- District: Qianjiang District
- Time zone: UTC+8 (China Standard)

Zhongtang Township (simplified Chinese: 中塘乡; traditional Chinese: 中塘鄉; pinyin: Zhōngtáng Xiāng) is a township under the administration of Qianjiang District, Chongqing, China. As of 2018, it has 2 residential communities and 3 villages under its administration.

== See also ==
- List of township-level divisions of Chongqing
