= Shatuo Dam =

- Location within China
- Country: China
- Location: Guizhou Province
- Coordinates: 28°30′06″N 108°28′57″E
- Purpose: Power
- Status: Operational
- Construction began: 2006
- Opening date: 2009

Dam and spillways
- Type of dam: Gravity
- Impounds: Wu River
- Height: 156 m (512 ft)

Reservoir
- Creates: Shatuo Reservoir
- Total capacity: 631,000,000 m^{3} (511,560 acre⋅ft)
- Catchment area: 54,508 km^{2} (21,046 sq mi)

Power Station
- Commission date: 2010-2013
- Type: Conventional
- Turbines: 4 x 280 MW Francis-type
- Installed capacity: 1,120 MW
- Annual generation: 4.55 billion kWh

The Shatuo Dam (Chinese: 沙沱水电站) is a gravity dam on the Wu River in Yanhe County, Guizhou Province, China.

== Construction ==
The ground-breaking ceremony for the dam was held on June 28, 2006, and excavation commenced soon thereafter. In 2008, after the original river closure, part of the dam failed due to the karst foundation, and had to be repaired. On April 19, 2009, the river was closed and the reservoir began to fill. All four generators were commissioned by 13 June 2013. A vertical ship lift is planned for the dam as well, and its expected completion is in 2020.

== See also ==
- List of power stations in China
