= Qianjiang, Chongqing =

Qianjiang 黔江区
- District
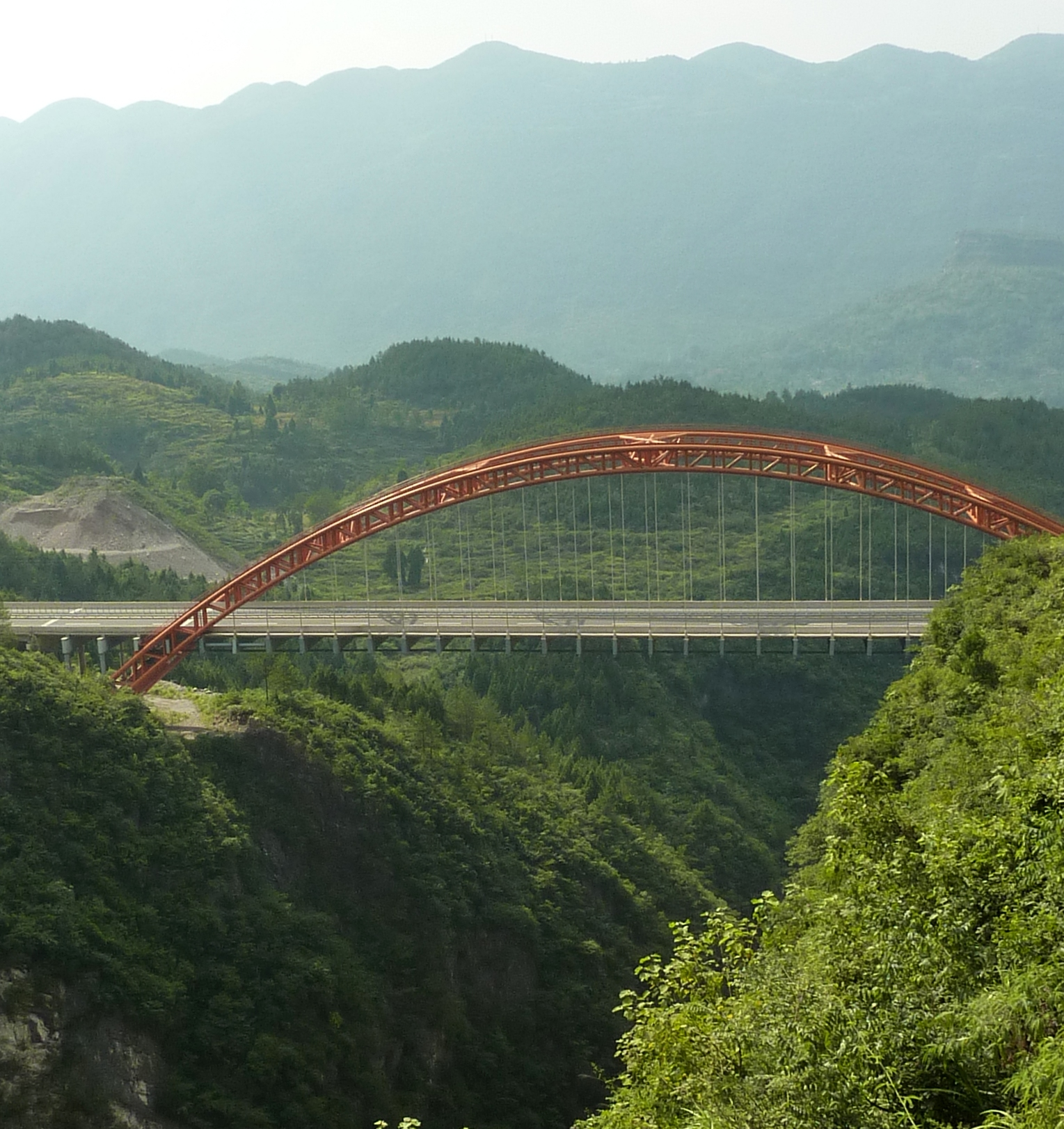
- Xisha Bridge on G65 Expressway

- Qianjiang District in Chongqing
- Coordinates (Qianjiang government): 29°32′01″N 108°46′15″E
- Country: People's Republic of China
- Municipality: Chongqing
- Seat: Chengxi Subdistrict

Area
  - Total: 2,397 km^{2} (925 sq mi)

Population (2009)
  - Total: 545,000
  - Density: 227/km^{2} (589/sq mi)
- Time zone: UTC+8 (China Standard)

Qianjiang District (Chinese: 黔江区; pinyin: Qiánjiāng Qū) is a district in the southeastern part of Chongqing, China, bordering Hubei province to the east and northeast. While it is governed as a district, in practice Qianjiang is its own city proper far removed from the urban centre of Chongqing. Qianjiang is nicknamed "The Throat of Sichuan and Hubei" (川鄂咽喉) because it sits on the intersection of Sichuan-Hubei and Sichuan-Hunan Roads.

Qianjiang District has a permanent population of 487,281, per the 2020 Chinese census, the majority of which is ethnically Tujia. The district is also home to large Han Chinese and Miao populations, which comprise about 30% and 15% of the district's population, respectively.

== History ==
According to the district government, humanoid activity in the region date back to approximately 600,000 years ago.

The district government claims the area was incorporated into the Xia dynasty as Liang Prefecture (Chinese: 梁州).

Later, the area would belong to the Baipu and the Ba state.

During the Qin dynasty, the area was organized as Ba Commandery and Nan Commandery. The area was home to a variety of different ethnic groups at the time.

In 140 BCE, during the Western Han period, Fuling County was established under the Ba Commandery. Fuling County's government was seated in present-day Yushan, and the county governed over much of present-day Chongqing and northeast Guizhou. Circa 106 BCE, Liang Prefecture was reorganized as Yi Province, which now governed the area.

In 201 CE, the area was reorganized as Fuling Commandery, which governed over four counties: Fuling County, Yongning County (Chinese: 永宁县), Hanjia County (Chinese: 汉葭县), and Danxing County (Chinese: 丹兴县). Danxing County, which survived up through the Northern and Southern dynasties period, had its county seat in present-day Chengdong Subdistrict in Qianjiang District. However, local administrative units often held little de facto power, as, for the next two centuries, local leaders of different ethnic groups raised local militias to promote their own interests. In 565 CE, local ethnic leader Tian Sihe (Chinese: 田思鹤), effectively incorporated much of the land in the area into the Northern Zhou. The Northern Zhou reorganized the area into a number of different zhou, including Feng Prefecture (which would shortly be changed to Qi Prefecture), Yong Prefecture, and Ting Prefecture.

In 585 CE (during the Sui dynasty), Danxing County was reorganized as Shicheng County (石城县), which belonged to Yong Prefecture (庸州), with the district seat at today's Ba Village of Baxiang County (坝乡县坝村). Due to the recent establishment of a number of other counties in the area, the territory governed by Shicheng County was relatively small, and the county was merged into Pengshui County (Chinese: 彭水县), which was governed by Qi Prefecture, in 607 CE. Yong Prefecture was replaced by Badong Commandery (巴东郡).

=== Tang dynasty ===
In 618 CE, during the Tang dynasty, Shicheng County was re-established and became part of Qian Prefecture (黔州). The county's seat was Wuci Town (无慈城). Shortly after, Qian Prefecture was abolished, and the area was reorganized as Qianzhong Commandery (Chinese: 黔中郡), which governed over five counties: Pengshui County (same name as the previous iteration), Hongdu County (Chinese: 洪杜县), Yangshui County (Chinese: 洋水县), Yongning County (same name as the previous iteration), and Shicheng County. In 630 CE, Shicheng's county seat moved back to Nanmuping. In 742 CE, Shicheng County was changed to Qianjiang County (Chinese: 黔江县), and put under the jurisdiction of An Commandry (安郡).

=== Song dynasty and Yuan dynasty ===
From 960 to 1368 (Song and Yuan), Qianjiang at this time was "half-barbarian" (半没于夷) and dominated by the local rich bourgeois of the Gongs, Hus, Qins, and Xiangs (龚、胡、秦、向) according to the Qianjiang County Records (黔江县志) of the Qing dynasty.

In 1228, during the Southern Song dynasty period, Qianjiang County was moved to the jurisdiction of Shaoqing Fu.

In 1285 (late Yuan), Qianjiang was part of Ming Yuzhen's Daxia Empire.

=== Ming dynasty ===
In 1372, Qianjiang County was merged into nearby Pengshui County (Chinese: 彭水县). In 1378, 1216 soldiers were dispatched here to guard the place. Qianjiang County was re-established in 1381.

=== Qing dynasty ===
In early Qing, Qianjiang District was under Chongqing Subprefecture. In 1726, Qianjiang County was reorganized as a subprefecture (Chinese: 厅). In 1734, the area was reorganized as Qianpeng Subprefecture, which governed Qianjiang County and Pengshui County. This proved to be short-lived, as Qianpeng Subprefecture was abolished in 1736, and the area now fell under the jurisdiction of Youyang Subprefecture.

=== Republic of China ===
In 1912, Qianjiang County was under Liuxiang Fangqu (刘湘防区). From 1927 to 1935, the county was directly governed by the Sichuan government. In 1935, Qianjiang County was placed under the jurisdiction of the Eighth Administrative Region (第八行政督察区) of Sichuan Province, also known as Youyang Special District (酉阳专署). The county seat was at Sanduo Town (三多镇).

=== People's Republic of China ===
On November 12, 1949, Qianjiang came under CPC control, and the People's Government was established on November 25, as part of Chuandong Administrative Special District (川东行政专区). The county seat changed to Lianhe Town (联合). On January 23, 1950, the county was reorganized under Youyang Prefecture (Chinese: 酉阳专区), which also administered Youyang and Xiushan Counties. In September 1952, Youyang was merged into Fuling Prefecture, which later became a second Fuling Prefecture (same English translation, different Chinese characters).

On November 14, 1983, the State Council approved changing Qianjiang County to Qianjiang Tujia and Miao Autonomous County (黔江土家苗族自治县), reflecting the area's large Tujia and Miao population. The assembly was established November 13 of the following year.

On May 18, 1988, the State Council halved Fuling, reorganizing Qianjiang County, as well as four other counties (5 autonomous counties of Fuling's 10 counties), into a new prefecture: Qianjiang Prefecture (Chinese: 黔江地区). The other four counties were:

- Shizhu Tujia Autonomous County (石柱土家族自治县)
- Pengshui Miao and Tujia Autonomous County (彭水苗族土家族自治县)
- Youyang Tujia and Miao Autonomous County (酉阳土家苗族自治县)
- Xiushan Tujia and Miao Autonomous County (秀山土家苗族自治县)

The prefecture officially began in November. At this time the area was 16,900 square kilometres (6,500 mi^{2}) with a population of 2,700,000.

Qianjiang County, along with Qianjiang District, was incorporated into Chongqing Municipality in 1997. In 1998, the prefecture was changed to the Qianjiang Development Area (Chinese: 黔江开发区), which governs Shizhu, Xiushan, Qianjiang County, Pengshui and Youyang on behalf of Chongqing. On May 22, 1998 (implemented June 2000), Qianjiang Development Area and Qianjiang Autonomous County were abolished. In June 2000, Qianjiang Autonomous County and the Qianjiang Development Area were abolished, and became Qianjing District, directly administered by Chongqing. Shizhu, Xiushan, Pengshui and Youyang remain autonomous counties, and are governed by Chongqing directly as well. Prior to becoming a district, Qianjiang had governed 5 towns, 45 townships, 8 neighborhood committees, and 517 village committees. Many townships were abolished, the only abolished town was Lianhe (联合), the old county seat now separated into sub-districts.

As of 2001, the district contained 3 sub-districts, 12 townships, 15 towns, and 489 village committees.

== Administrative divisions ==
Currently, Qianjiang District administers 6 subdistricts, 15 towns, and 9 townships.

Name	Chinese (S)	Hanyu Pinyin	Population (2010)	Area (km^{2})
Chengdong Subdistrict	城东街道	Chéngdōng Jiēdào	71,304	50
Chengnan Subdistrict	城南街道	Chéngnán Jiēdào	33,844	70
Chengxi Subdistrict	城西街道	Chéngxī Jiēdào	38,579	89.734
Zhengyang Subdistrict	正阳街道	Zhèngyáng Jiēdào	12,998	43.89
Zhoubai Subdistrict	舟白街道	Zhōubái Jiēdào	25,147	85.13
Fengjia Subdistrict	冯家街道	Féngjiā Jiēdào	21,810	51
Apengjiang town	阿蓬江镇	Āpéngjiāng Zhèn	18,596	174
Shihui town	石会镇	Shíhuì Zhèn	15,205	128
Heixi town	黑溪镇	Hēixī Zhèn	14,810	94
Huangxi town	黄溪镇	Huángxī Zhèn	9,862	70
Lishui town	黎水镇	Líshuǐ Zhèn	8,896	82
Jinxi town	金溪镇	Jīnxī Zhèn	8,940	42
Mala town	马喇镇	Mǎlǎ Zhèn	11,813	91
Zhuoshui town	濯水镇	Zhuóshuǐ Zhèn	20,386	105
Shijia town	石家镇	Shíjiā Zhèn	9,629	104
Echi town	鹅池镇	Échí Zhèn	8,581	73.2
Xiaonanhai town	小南海镇	Xiǎonánhǎi Zhèn	6,662	115
Lin'e town	邻鄂镇	Lín'è Zhèn	9,942	50
Baishi town	白石镇	Báishí Zhèn	11,706	95
Zhongtang town	中塘镇	Zhōngtáng Zhèn	11,324	80.47
Shaba town	沙坝镇	Shābà Zhèn	11,414	80
Pengdong Township	蓬东乡	Péngdōng Xiāng	6,066	34.9
Shanling Township	杉岭乡	Shānlǐng Xiāng	6,753	54
Taiji Township	太极乡	Tàijí Xiāng	8,242	64
Shuitian Township	水田乡	Shuǐtián Xiāng	5,984	40
Baitu Township	白土乡	Báitǔ Xiāng	5,188	66
Jindong Township	金洞乡	Jīndòng Xiāng	7,070	96.33
Wuli Township	五里乡	Wǔlǐ Xiāng	8,010	50
Shuishi Township	水市乡	Shuǐshì Xiāng	9,170	103
Xinhua Township	新华乡	Xīnhuá Xiāng	7,081	76

== Climate ==
Climate data for Qianjiang, elevation 607 m (1,991 ft), (1991–2020 normals, extremes 1981–2010)
Month	Jan	Feb	Mar	Apr	May	Jun	Jul	Aug	Sep	Oct	Nov	Dec	Year
Record high °C (°F)	21.2 (70.2)	27.6 (81.7)	31.6 (88.9)	34.3 (93.7)	35.1 (95.2)	37.2 (99.0)	38.4 (101.1)	39.5 (103.1)	36.6 (97.9)	33.6 (92.5)	27.0 (80.6)	19.8 (67.6)	39.5 (103.1)
Mean daily maximum °C (°F)	8.2 (46.8)	10.7 (51.3)	15.4 (59.7)	21.3 (70.3)	25.3 (77.5)	28.3 (82.9)	31.2 (88.2)	31.4 (88.5)	27.1 (80.8)	21.0 (69.8)	16.0 (60.8)	10.2 (50.4)	20.5 (68.9)
Daily mean °C (°F)	4.8 (40.6)	7.0 (44.6)	10.8 (51.4)	16.0 (60.8)	20.1 (68.2)	23.5 (74.3)	26.1 (79.0)	25.8 (78.4)	22.0 (71.6)	16.6 (61.9)	11.8 (53.2)	6.7 (44.1)	15.9 (60.7)
Mean daily minimum °C (°F)	2.5 (36.5)	4.5 (40.1)	7.7 (45.9)	12.5 (54.5)	16.6 (61.9)	20.1 (68.2)	22.6 (72.7)	22.0 (71.6)	18.6 (65.5)	13.8 (56.8)	9.2 (48.6)	4.3 (39.7)	12.9 (55.2)
Record low °C (°F)	−4.0 (24.8)	−4.2 (24.4)	−2.2 (28.0)	3.0 (37.4)	8.5 (47.3)	12.9 (55.2)	15.7 (60.3)	14.7 (58.5)	10.8 (51.4)	3.6 (38.5)	−0.9 (30.4)	−4.0 (24.8)	−4.2 (24.4)
Average precipitation mm (inches)	21.7 (0.85)	32.6 (1.28)	49.8 (1.96)	115.2 (4.54)	169.9 (6.69)	155.4 (6.12)	163.0 (6.42)	165.7 (6.52)	103.9 (4.09)	103.6 (4.08)	58.1 (2.29)	19.7 (0.78)	1,158.6 (45.62)
Average precipitation days (≥ 0.1 mm)	10.6	10.7	12.3	15.5	17.5	15.8	14.0	13.5	10.7	14.1	11.4	9.6	155.7
Average snowy days	5.3	2.8	0.8	0	0	0	0	0	0	0	0.2	1.5	10.6
Average relative humidity (%)	78	77	76	78	78	79	78	76	77	82	81	79	78
Mean monthly sunshine hours	39.9	39.1	69.2	90.0	104.9	105.0	157.5	176.7	121.0	77.9	63.1	47.8	1,092.1
Percentage possible sunshine	12	12	19	23	25	25	37	44	33	22	20	15	24
Source: China Meteorological Administration

== Demographics ==
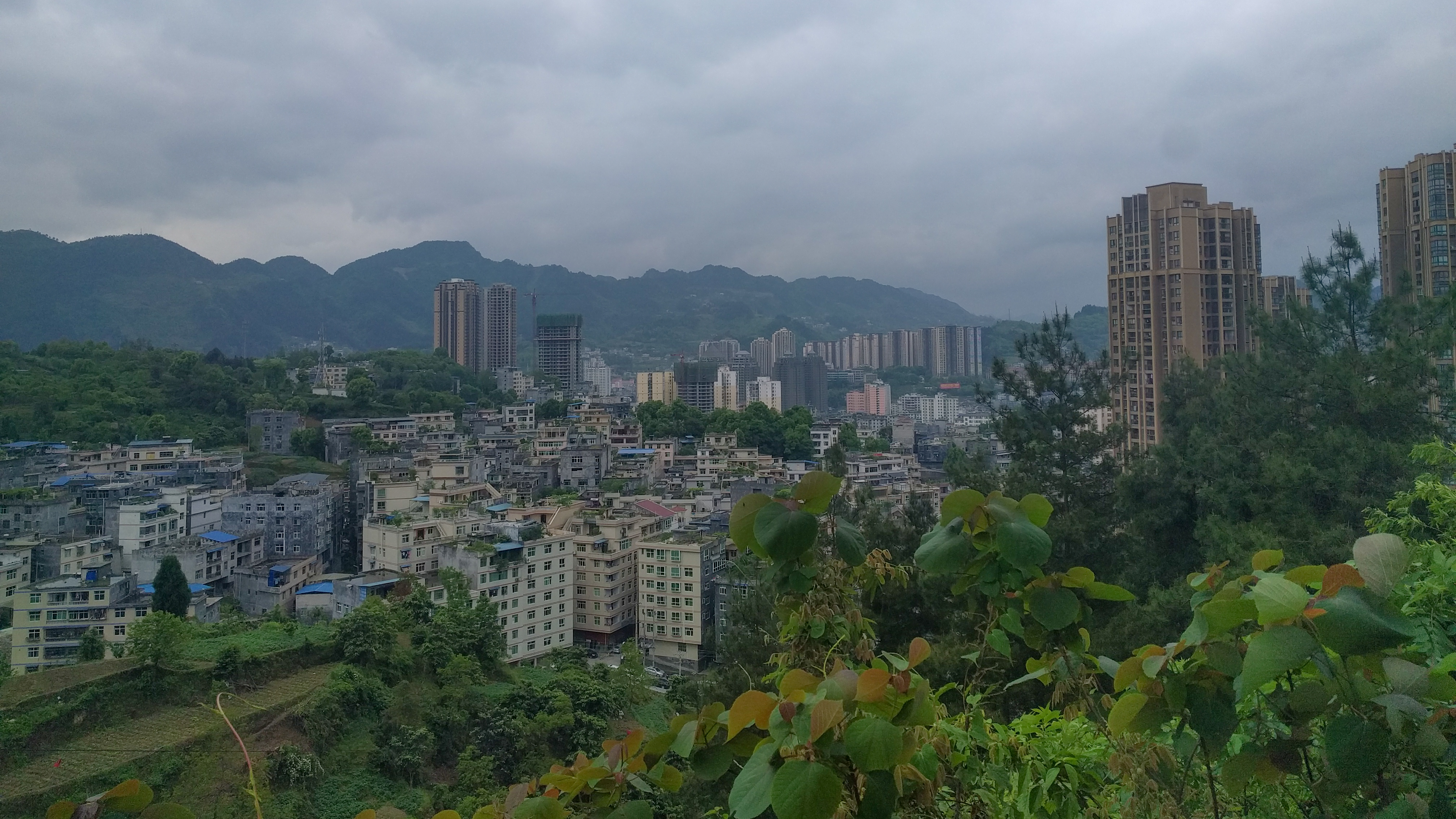
A view of Qianjiang District's urban core

According the 2020 Chinese census, there are 487,281 permanent residents in the district, a 9.50% increase from the 2010 Chinese census. The 2020 census reported 176,443 household units in the district, of which, 170,310 households are familial, and the other 6,133 are non-familial households. 457,711 people in the district live in familial households, and 29,570 people live in non-familial households.

=== Ethnic groups ===
As of 2020, 55.11% of Qianjiang District is ethnically Tujia, 29.27% is Han Chinese, 15.19% is Miao, and the remaining 0.43% belonging to 24 various other ethnic minorities. From 2010 to 2020, the district's Han Chinese population grew by 20.04%, the Miao population grew by 6.39%, the Tujia population grew 4.80%, and the population belonging to other ethnic groups grew 459.79%.

== Transport ==
Qianjiang is located on the border between Chongqing Municipality and Hubei and Hunan provinces. The G65 Baotou–Maoming Expressway connects Qianjiang with the Chongqing city proper to the west and the city of Huaihua to the southeast. On G65, the drive to Chongqing city proper could take more than four hours. China National Highway 319 also runs through Qianjiang.

Qianjiang station lies on the Xiamen–Chongqing high-speed railway and the Chongqing–Huaihua railway.

Qianjiang is served by the Qianjiang Wulingshan Airport, a regional airport with connections to Chongqing, Beijing, Guangzhou, Chengdu, and Kunming.
