= Silin Dam =

- Location within China
- Official name: 思林水坝
- Coordinates: 27°48′08″N 108°11′10″E
- Purpose: Power
- Status: Operational
- Construction began: 2004
- Opening date: 2008

Dam and spillways
- Type of dam: Gravity, roller-compacted concrete
- Impounds: Wu River
- Height: 117 m (384 ft)
- Length: 310 m (1,017 ft)

Reservoir
- Creates: Silin Reservoir
- Total capacity: 1,205,000,000 m^{3} (976,909 acre⋅ft)

Power Station
- Commission date: 2009
- Type: Conventional
- Turbines: 4 x 270 MW Francis turbines
- Installed capacity: 1,080 MW
- Annual generation: 4.064 billion kWh

The Silin Dam (Chinese: 思林水坝) is a concrete gravity dam on the Wu River in Sinan County, Guizhou Province, China. The dam has an associated hydroelectric power plant with a 1,080 MW capacity utilizing 4 x 270 MW Francis turbine-generators. The dam is 310 m (1,017 ft) long, 117 m (384 ft) high and composed of roller-compacted concrete. Its reservoir has a 1,205,000,000 m^{3} (976,909 acre⋅ft) capacity, 184,000,000 m^{3} (149,171 acre⋅ft) of which is flood storage. The dam also supports ship lift. Construction on the dam began in October 2004, the dam began to impound the river in March 2008 and by May 2009, the power plant's first generator was operational. The remaining generators were operational by December 2009.

== See also ==
- List of power stations in China
