= Yu River (Hubei) =

River in Chongqing and Hubei, China

Coordinates: 29°18′06″N 108°09′40″E

The Yu River (郁江 / 鬱江) is a river in Hubei and Chongqing provinces, China. It is a tributary of the Wu River.
