= Pengshui Miao and Tujia Autonomous County =

Pengshui 彭水县
- Autonomous County
- 彭水苗族土家族自治县; Pengshui Miao and Tujia Autonomous County
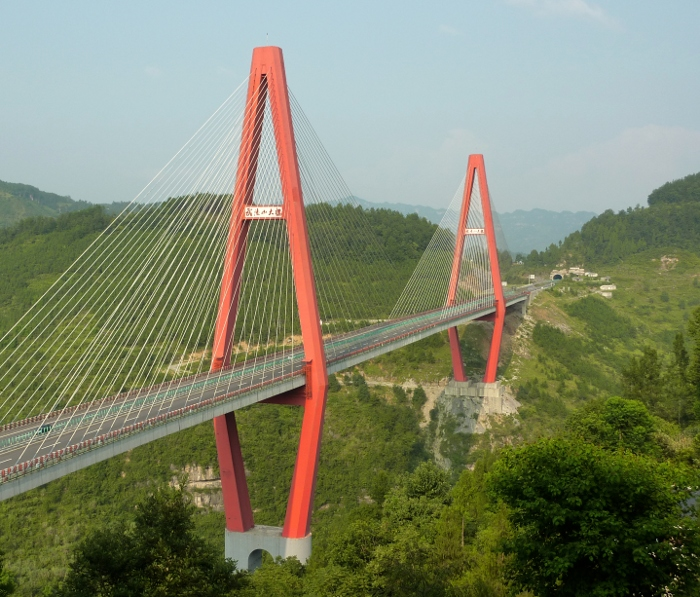
- Wulingshan Bridge

- Location of Pengshui County in Chongqing
- Coordinates: 29°17′39″N 108°09′49″E
- Country: China
- Municipality: Chongqing
- County seat: Hanjia Subdistrict

Area
  - Total: 3,903 km^{2} (1,507 sq mi)

Population (2020 census)
  - Total: 530,599
  - Density: 135.9/km^{2} (352.1/sq mi)
- Time zone: UTC+8 (China Standard)
- Website: www.psx.gov.cn

Pengshui Miao and Tujia Autonomous County (simplified Chinese: 彭水苗族土家族自治县; traditional Chinese: 彭水苗族土家族自治縣; pinyin: Péngshuǐ Miáozú Tǔjiāzú Zìzhìxiàn) is an autonomous county for the Miao and Tujia people located in southeastern Chongqing, China, bordering Guizhou province to the south and southwest and Hubei province to the northeast. It is 270 kilometres (170 mi) away from downtown Chongqing.

The county spans an area of 3,903 square kilometres (1,507 mi^{2}), and has a population of 545,094 as of 2010. The county's government is located in Hanjia Subdistrict.

== History ==
During the Shang and Zhou dynasties, the region of contemporary Pengshui belonged to the State of Ba. During the Warring States period, the area belonged to the Qianzhong Commandery, which would later be incorporated into Qin dynasty China.

During the Han dynasty, the area would be reorganized as Fuling County (Chinese: 涪陵縣).

Under the Sui dynasty, in 593 CE, the area was organized as Pengshui County (Chinese: 彭水縣). Pengshui means "Peng River", which was the old name for the Yu River. During the Tang dynasty, Pengshui County was put under the administration of Shannan Circuit and Qianzhong Circuit. Under the Song dynasty, Pengshui was administered by Qian Prefecture. Under the Yuan dynasty, it was administered by Shaoqing Fu. By 1645 during the Qing dynasty, it was part of Chongqing Prefecture (Chinese: 重慶府). In 1913 (Republic of China), it was part of Dongchuan Circuit (Chinese: 東川道). In 1927, it was reassigned to the Changgong Bureau (Chinese: 長公署) of Sichuan Province. And in 1935, of the Eighth Administrative Inspection Area (Chinese: 第八行政督察區) of Sichuan.

On November 16, 1949, Pengshui was captured by the communists. In January 1950, it was put under the jurisdiction of Fuling Prefecture, under the Chuandong administrative territory (Chinese: 川東行署涪陵專區). In September 1952, Fuling Special District was transferred to Sichuan, and was changed to a prefecture in June 1968.

On November 14, 1983 Pengshui was approved as an autonomous county. The official status began November 10 of the following year. In 1987, it was assigned to Qianjiang Prefecture. In June 1997, it fell under the administration of Chongqing, which it remains today.

== Geography ==
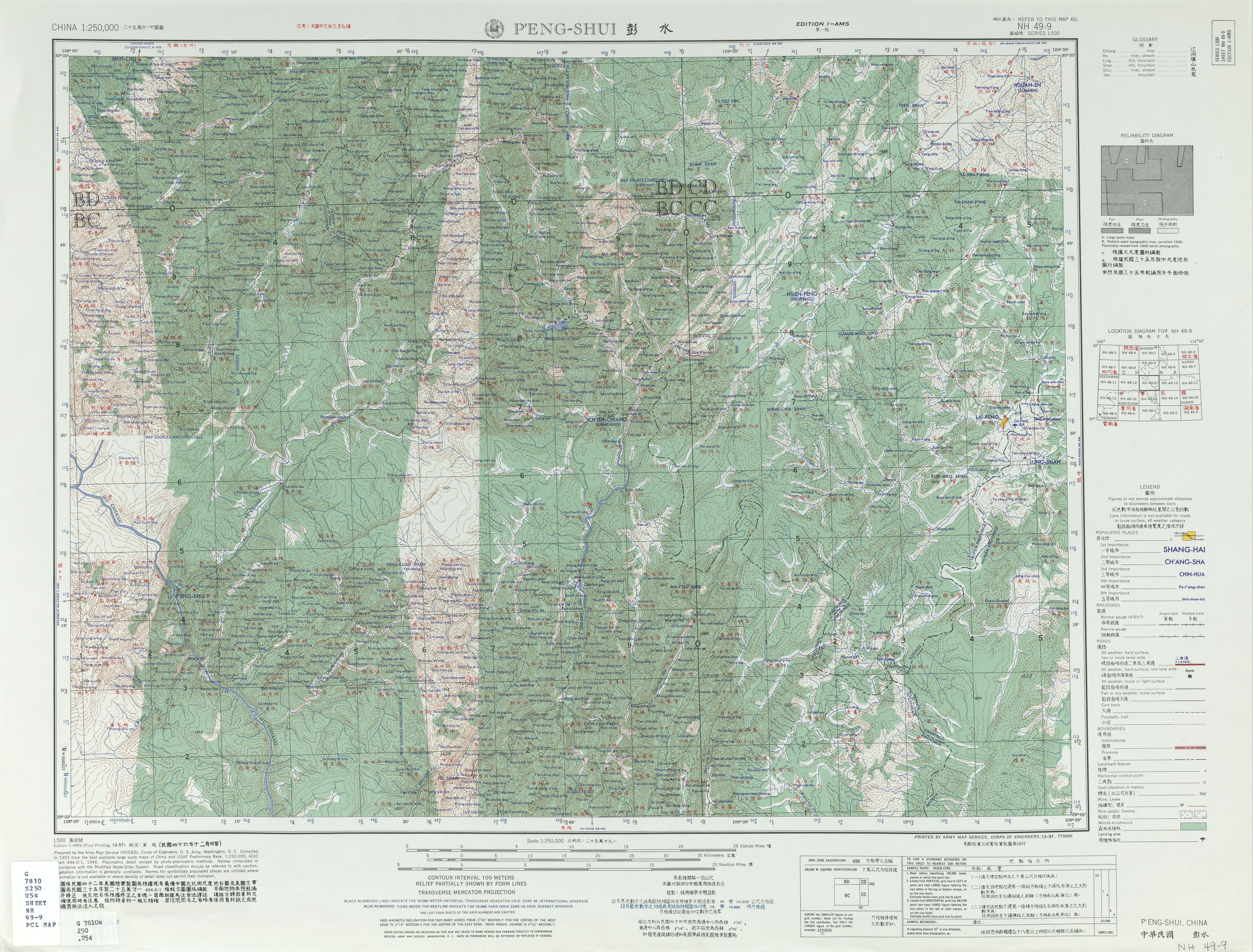
Map including Pengshui (labeled as P'ENG-SHUI 彭水) (AMS, 1953)

Pengshui Miao and Tujia Autonomous County is located in the Sichuan Basin along the Wu River, in the mountainous region of Wuling. A total of 54.2% of Pengshui is covered by forest. Geographic coordinates: 28°57′ – 29° 51′ North, 107°48′ – 108°36′ East. Altitude of the seat: 245 m (804 ft).

The county is home to three peaks over 1,000 metres (3,300 ft) above sea level: Qiliangzi (Chinese: 七梁子) at 1,434 metres (4,705 ft), Baila Mountain (Chinese: 白蜡山) at 1,393 metres (4,570 ft), and Fenghuang Mountain (Chinese: 凤凰山) at 1,048 metres (3,438 ft).

Neighbours:

- North: Shizhu Tujia Autonomous County
- Northeast: Lichuan City, Enshi Tujia and Miao Autonomous Prefecture, Hubei
- East: Qianjiang District
- Southeast: Youyang Tujia and Miao Autonomous County
- South: Yanhe Tujia Autonomous County, Guizhou; Wuchuan Gelao and Miao Autonomous County
- Southwest: Daozhen Gelao and Miao Autonomous County, Guizhou
- West: Wulong County
- Northwest: Fengdu County

=== Climate ===
The county's average annual temperature is 17.6 °C (63.7 °F), and the average annual precipitation is 1,235 millimetres (48.6 in).

Climate data for Pengshui, elevation 322 m (1,056 ft), (1991–2020 normals, extremes 1981–present)
Month	Jan	Feb	Mar	Apr	May	Jun	Jul	Aug	Sep	Oct	Nov	Dec	Year
Record high °C (°F)	21.1 (70.0)	27.2 (81.0)	34.8 (94.6)	38.4 (101.1)	36.9 (98.4)	40.1 (104.2)	41.8 (107.2)	42.5 (108.5)	41.5 (106.7)	35.7 (96.3)	28.2 (82.8)	20.7 (69.3)	42.5 (108.5)
Mean daily maximum °C (°F)	10.1 (50.2)	12.5 (54.5)	17.6 (63.7)	23.4 (74.1)	26.9 (80.4)	29.9 (85.8)	33.6 (92.5)	34.0 (93.2)	28.9 (84.0)	22.5 (72.5)	17.3 (63.1)	11.7 (53.1)	22.4 (72.3)
Daily mean °C (°F)	7.1 (44.8)	9.0 (48.2)	12.9 (55.2)	17.9 (64.2)	21.5 (70.7)	24.6 (76.3)	27.6 (81.7)	27.5 (81.5)	23.6 (74.5)	18.3 (64.9)	13.6 (56.5)	8.7 (47.7)	17.7 (63.9)
Mean daily minimum °C (°F)	5.2 (41.4)	6.8 (44.2)	10.1 (50.2)	14.6 (58.3)	18.2 (64.8)	21.5 (70.7)	24.0 (75.2)	23.7 (74.7)	20.5 (68.9)	16.0 (60.8)	11.5 (52.7)	6.8 (44.2)	14.9 (58.8)
Record low °C (°F)	−0.9 (30.4)	−0.8 (30.6)	0.8 (33.4)	6.1 (43.0)	11.1 (52.0)	15.1 (59.2)	17.6 (63.7)	16.7 (62.1)	13.8 (56.8)	7.5 (45.5)	1.9 (35.4)	−1.3 (29.7)	−1.3 (29.7)
Average precipitation mm (inches)	22.8 (0.90)	30.3 (1.19)	56.3 (2.22)	110.0 (4.33)	188.2 (7.41)	193.3 (7.61)	190.0 (7.48)	144.8 (5.70)	114.3 (4.50)	113.3 (4.46)	59.7 (2.35)	19.7 (0.78)	1,242.7 (48.93)
Average precipitation days (≥ 0.1 mm)	11.1	11.1	14.0	15.3	17.2	15.9	13.8	13.0	12.0	16.0	12.3	10.2	161.9
Average snowy days	1.2	0.3	0.1	0	0	0	0	0	0	0	0	0.4	2
Average relative humidity (%)	78	78	77	78	80	81	78	75	78	83	83	80	79
Mean monthly sunshine hours	27.9	29.5	54.3	77.3	88.2	86.4	139.5	148.9	90.6	55.2	45.3	31.1	874.2
Percentage possible sunshine	9	9	15	20	21	21	33	37	25	16	14	10	19
Source: China Meteorological Administration

== Demographics ==
As of the 2010 Chinese Census, the county had a population 545,094, down from the 590,228 reported in the 2000 Chinese Census. In 1996, the county had an estimated population of 587,000.

59.5% of Pengshui residents are members of the following 11 ethnic minorities: Miao, Tujia, Mongols, Hui, Gelao, Dong, Tibetans, Manchus, Zhuang, Yi, and Hani. There are 270,000 Miao and 90,000 Tujia in Pengshui.

== Subdivisions ==
The county administers 3 subdistricts, 18 towns, and 18 townships.

3 subdistricts

- Hanjia Subdistrict (汉葭街道)
- Shaoqing Subdistrict (绍庆街道)
- Dianshui Subdistrict (靛水街道)

18 towns

- Baojia (保家镇)
- Yushan (郁山镇)
- Gaogu (高谷镇)
- Sangzhe (桑柘镇)
- Lujiao (鹿角镇)
- Huangjia (黄家镇)
- Puzi (普子镇)
- Longshe (龙射镇)
- Lianhu (连湖镇)
- Wanzu (万足镇)
- Ping'an (平安镇)
- Changsheng (长生镇)
- Xintian (新田镇)
- Anzi (鞍子镇)
- Taiyuan (太原镇)
- Longxi (龙溪镇)
- Meiziya (梅子垭镇)
- Datong (大同镇)

18 townships

- Yandong Township (岩东乡)
- Luming Township (鹿鸣乡)
- Ditang Township (棣棠乡)
- Sanyi Township (三义乡)
- Lianhe Township (联合乡)
- Shiliu Township (石柳乡)
- Zouma Township (走马乡)
- Lutang Township (芦塘乡)
- Qiaozi Township (乔梓乡)
- Zhufo Township (诸佛乡)
- Tonglou Township (桐楼乡)
- Shangan Township (善感乡)
- Shuanglong Township (双龙乡)
- Shipan Township (石盘乡)
- Daya Township (大垭乡)
- Runxi Township (润溪乡)
- Langxi Township (朗溪乡)
- Longtang Township (龙塘乡)

== Economy ==
Mineral deposits in the county include coal, barite, marble, fluorite, and calcite.

== Transportation ==
The Chongqing–Huaihua railway runs through the county. Major expressways which pass through the county include the G65 Baotou–Maoming Expressway and National Highway 319.
