= Liuguanghe Bridge =

Liuguanghe Bridge 六广河大桥
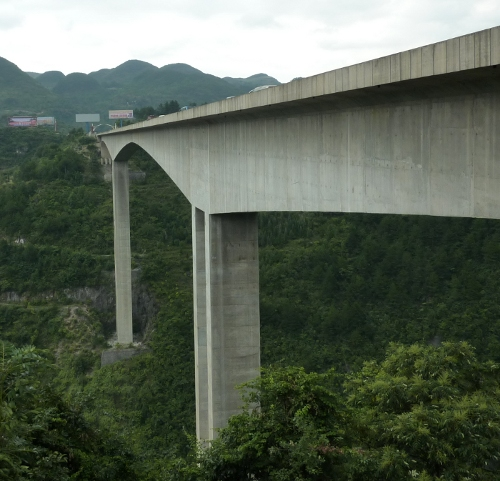
- Coordinates: 26°59′23.5″N 106°24′25.5″E
- Carries: China National Highway 321
- Crosses: Wu River (Yachi)
- Locale: Liu Guangzhen, Guizhou

Characteristics
- Height: 297 metres (974 ft)
- Longest span: 240 metres (790 ft)

History
- Opened: 2001

Location
- Interactive map of Liuguanghe Bridge

Liuguanghe Bridge is a 297-metre-high (974 ft) beam bridge at Liu Guangzhen, Guizhou, China. It held the record for world's highest bridge from its completion in 2001 until 2003, surpassing the 72-year-old, 291-metre-high (955 ft) Royal Gorge Bridge in the U.S., until the opening of the 366 m (1,201 ft) Beipan River Guanxing Highway Bridge, also in China. As of 2011, it is still the highest beam bridge and among the twenty highest bridges in the world.

The Liuguanghe Bridge forms part of China National Highway 321 between Bijie and Guiyang and has a 240-metre-long (790 ft) span. The highest pillar, which sits on the edge of a steep, deep valley, is 90 metres high.

== See also ==
- List of highest bridges in the world
