= Dongfeng Dam =

- Location within China
- Country: China
- Location: Qingzhen
- Coordinates: 26°51′19″N 106°09′18″E
- Status: Operational
- Construction began: 1989
- Opening date: 1995
- Owner: Guizhou Wujiang Hydropower Development Co.

Dam and spillways
- Type of dam: Arch
- Impounds: Wu River
- Height: 162 m (531 ft)
- Length: 254 m (833 ft)
- Width (crest): 6 m (20 ft)
- Width (base): 25 m (82 ft)
- Spillway capacity: 2,565 m^{3}/s (90,582 cu ft/s)

Reservoir
- Total capacity: 1,025,000,000 m^{3} (830,981 acre⋅ft)
- Active capacity: 491,000,000 m^{3} (398,060 acre⋅ft)
- Catchment area: 1,816 km^{2} (701 sq mi)
- Normal elevation: 970 m (3,182 ft)

Power Station
- Commission date: 1994-1995
- Type: Conventional
- Hydraulic head: 132 m (433 ft) (max)
- Turbines: 3 x 190 MW Francis-type
- Installed capacity: 570 MW
- Annual generation: 2,420 GWh

The Dongfeng Dam is an arch dam on the Wu River 65 km (40 mi) northwest of Qingzhen in Guizhou Province, China. The primary purpose of the dam is hydroelectric power generation and it supports a 570 MW power station. Construction on the dam began in 1989 and the first generator was operational in 1994, the last in 1995. The generators were up-rated between 2004 and 2005; bringing their capacity from 170 MW each to 190 MW.

== Design and operation ==
The Dongfeng is a 162 m (531 ft) tall and 254 m (833 ft) long parabola-shaped arch dam. The dam is 6 m (20 ft) thick at its crest and 25 m (82 ft) at its base. It sits at the base of a catchment area covering 1,816 km^{2} (701 sq mi). The total reservoir capacity is 1,025,000,000 m^{3} (830,981 acre⋅ft) while 491,000,000 m^{3} (398,060 acre⋅ft) is for regulating. At the reservoir's normal elevation of 970 m (3,182 ft) above sea level, the reservoir capacity is 864,000,000 m^{3} (700,456 acre⋅ft). The dam has several discharge facilities; three spillway gates near the crest, three intermediate orifice openings, one chute spillway on the left bank and beside it, one spillway tunnel. The maximum discharge capacity of the spillways is 2,565 m^{3}/s (90,582 cu ft/s) while all openings, including the power station tailrace, can discharge 12,369 m^{3}/s (436,807 cu ft/s). The power station is located underground on the right bank of the dam. The intake releases water to three headrace tunnels which transfer into penstocks and supply each of the 190 MW Francis turbine-generators. Water is discharged back into the river via one tailrace tunnel.

== See also ==
- List of dams and reservoirs in China
- List of major power stations in Guizhou
