= Goupitan Dam =

Dam in Guizhou, China

- Location within China
- Interactive map of Goupitan Dam
- Official name: 构皮滩大坝
- Location: Guizhou, China
- Coordinates: 27°22′31″N 107°37′59″E
- Status: Operational
- Construction began: November 2003
- Opening date: 2009
- Construction cost: ¥13.842 billion

Dam and spillways
- Type of dam: Double-curvature arch dam
- Impounds: Wu River
- Height: 232.5 m (763 ft)
- Length: 557.11 m (1,828 ft)

Reservoir
- Creates: Goupitan Reservoir
- Total capacity: 6,451,000,000 m^{3} (5,229,911 acre⋅ft)
- Catchment area: 43,250 km^{2} (16,699 sq mi)
- Surface area: 94.29 km^{2} (36 sq mi)

Power Station
- Commission date: 2009
- Turbines: 5 × 600MW
- Installed capacity: 3,000 MW
- Annual generation: 9.667 TWh (est.)

The Goupitan Dam (simplified Chinese: 构皮滩大坝; traditional Chinese: 構皮灘大壩; pinyin: Gòupítān Dàbà) is an arch dam on the Wu River, a tributary of the Yangtze River in Guizhou Province, southwest of China. The dam's hydroelectric facility will operate on five turbines, each with a hydroelectric generating capacity of 600 MW, for a total of 3,000 MW. Constructions began on in 2003 and the first generator was operational in June 2009. All works were completed in 2011.

The dam is supplemented by the Goupitan shiplift, said to be the tallest boat lift in the world. Xinhua reported, on July 3, 2020, it would be complete by March 2021.

== See also ==
- List of power stations in China
