= Wujiangdu Dam =

- Location within China
- Country: China
- Location: Zunyi, Guizhou Province
- Coordinates: 27°19′10″N 106°45′39″E
- Status: In use
- Construction began: 1970
- Opening date: 1982
- Owner: China Huadian Group

Dam and spillways
- Type of dam: Arch-gravity
- Impounds: Wu River
- Height: 165 m (541 ft)
- Length: 395 m (1,296 ft)
- Dam volume: 2,560,000 m (8,398,950 ft)
- Spillways: 6
- Spillway type: Crest, controlled overflow
- Spillway capacity: 21,350 m^{3}/s (753,968 cu ft/s) (max.)

Reservoir
- Creates: Wujiangdu Reservoir
- Total capacity: 2,300,000,000 m^{3} (1,864,640 acre⋅ft)
- Catchment area: 27,790 km^{2} (10,730 sq mi)

Power Station
- Commission date: 1979-2004
- Type: Conventional
- Turbines: 3 x 210 MW, 2 x 250 MW Francis turbines
- Installed capacity: 1,130 MW
- Annual generation: 3.34 TWh

The Wujiangdu Dam is an arch-gravity dam on the Wu River south of Zunyi, Guizhou Province, China. The purpose of the dam is hydroelectric power generation, flood control and navigation. The dam's power stations contain five generators for a total installed capacity of 1,130 MW.

== Construction ==
Construction on the dam began in 1970, the first generator was operational in 1979 and the remaining original two in 1983. Two additional 250 MW generators were installed and operational between 2003 and 2004 and the three original 210 MW were upgraded in 2011 to 250 MW units.

== Design ==
The dam is a 165 m (541 ft) tall and 395 m (1,296 ft) long arch-gravity dam withholding a reservoir of 2,300,000,000 m^{3} (1,864,640 acre⋅ft). The dam has six spillways, two of which flank the power house and are ski-jump chute type while the other four are chutes as well and over-top the power house. The design discharge of the spillways is 18,360 m^{3}/s (648,377 cu ft/s) while the maximum is 21,350 m^{3}/s (753,968 cu ft/s). The dam also has two flood discharge tunnels on each of its banks as well. Because the dam sits on a karst (soluble) foundation, a deep and high pressure grout curtain was applied, stretching 1,020 m (3,346 ft) long and 200 m (656 ft) deep. The dam's power station sits at its middle base and contains the original 3 x 210 MW generators. The two additional 250 MW generators were installed in another power plant.

== See also ==
- List of power stations in China
