= Nanpan River =

Coordinates: 24°57′16″N 106°8′30″E

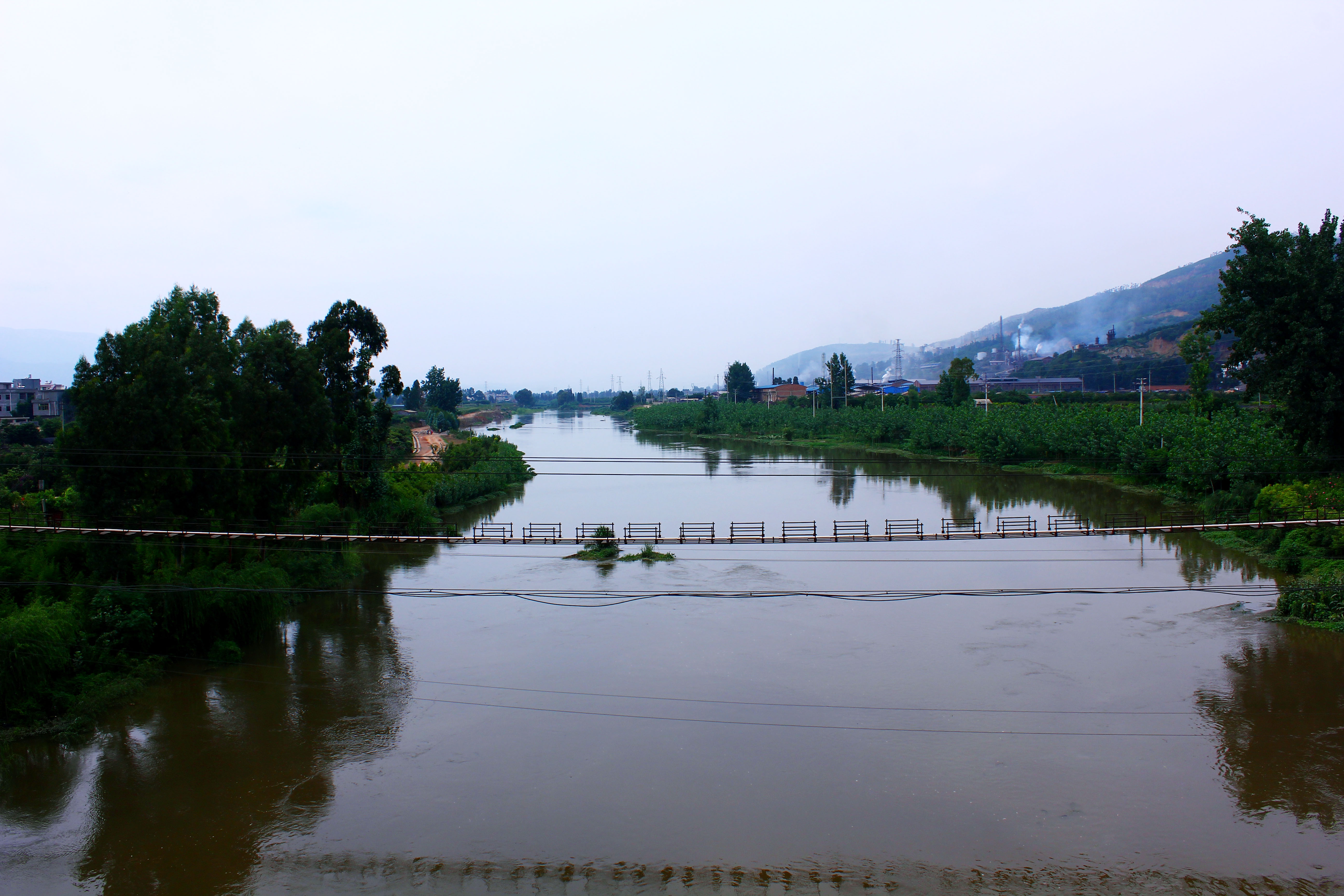
- Nanpan River near Yiliang County, Kunming

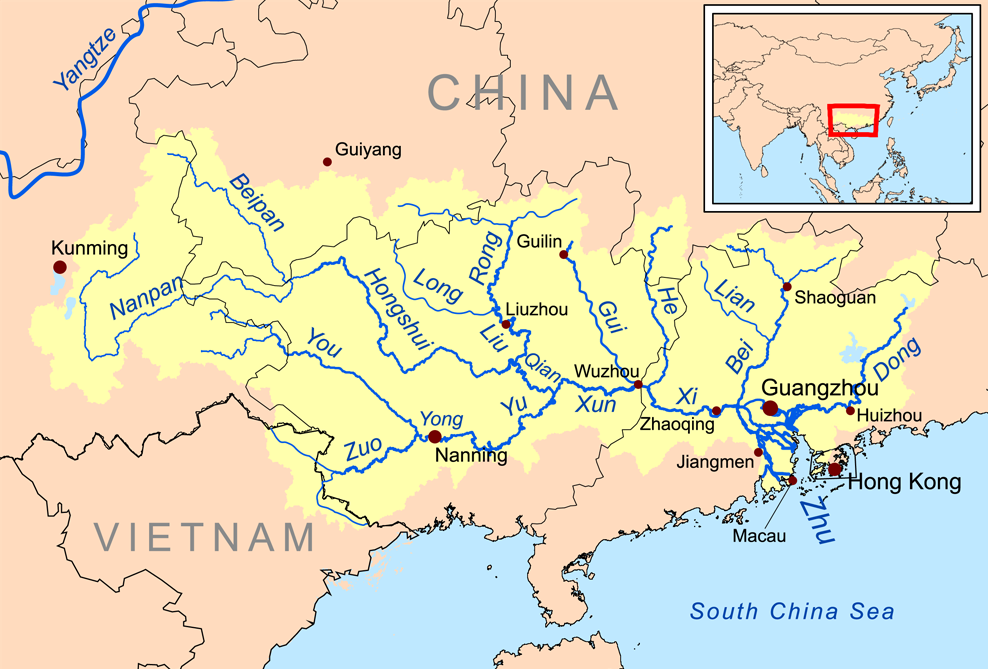
- The Pearl River system with the Nanpan River in the west

Location
- Country: China

Physical characteristics
- Length: 950 km (590 mi)

The Nanpan River (Chinese: 南盘江; pinyin: Nánpán Jiāng) has its source in the Yungui Plateau of eastern Yunnan Province. It then flows east, forming part of the border between Guizhou and Guangxi provinces. It joins with the Beipan River to become the Hongshui River. It is roughly 950 km (590 mi) long.

Part of the Nanpan River is blocked by the Tianshengqiao Dam (Chinese: 天生桥大坝; pinyin: Tiānshēngqiáo dà bà), from which Wanfeng Lake (Chinese: 万峰湖; pinyin: Wànfēng hú) is formed.

Along the Nanpan river, many ports were owned by the Cen clan who established in Guangxi to suppress a rebellion since 1053 AD.
