= Wu River (Yangtze tributary) =

Coordinates: 29.7167°N 107.4000°E

Wu River Sancha, Yachi
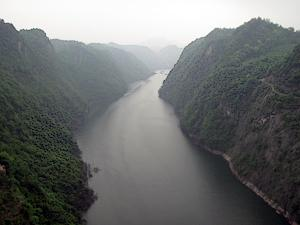
- Wu River

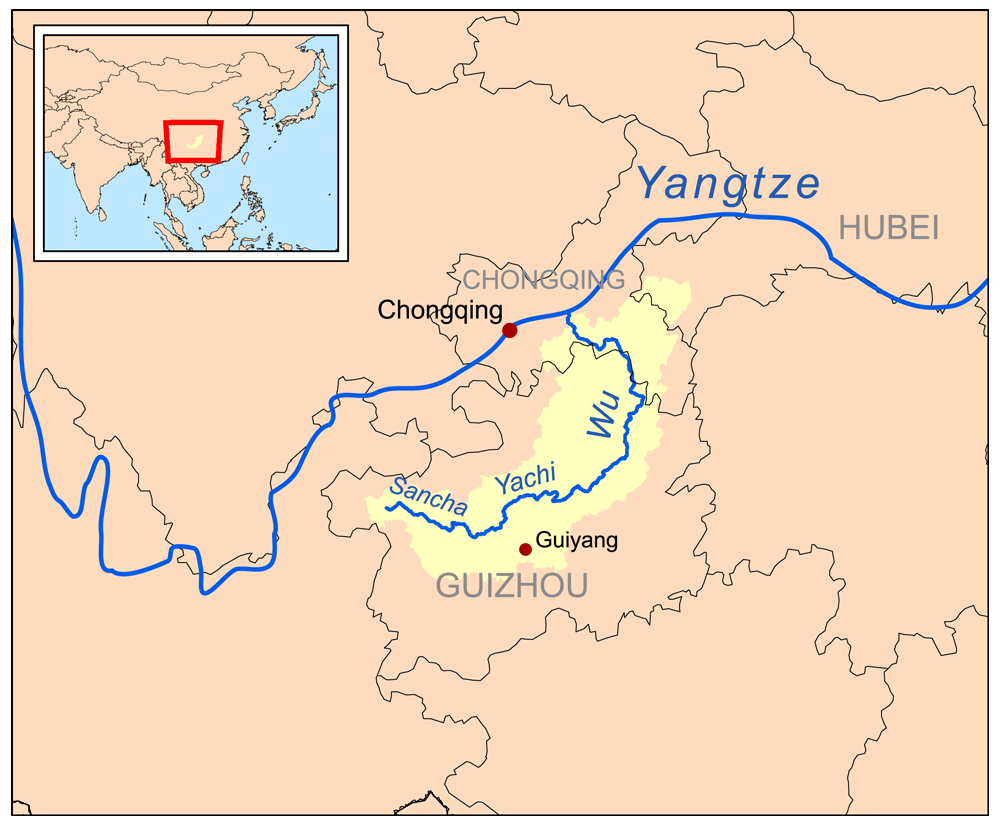
- Wujiang drainage basin
- Etymology: Named for 12 peaks of Wu Mountain
- Native name: Wu Jiang (Chinese)

Location
- Country: China
- State: Guizhou
- District: Chongqing
- Cities: Wulong, Fuling

Physical characteristics
- Source: Sancha
  - location: Western Guizhou
- Mouth: Yangtze River
  - location: Fuling, Eastern Chongqing Municipality
- Length: 1,150 km (710 mi)
- Basin size: 80,300 km^{2} (31,000 sq mi)
- Discharge
  - location: Gongtan
  - average: 1,108 m^{3}/s (39,100 cu ft/s)
  - minimum: 272 m^{3}/s (9,600 cu ft/s)
  - maximum: 3,340 m^{3}/s (118,000 cu ft/s)

Basin features
- River system: Yangtze River system
- Tributaries
  - left: Liuchong River, Furong River
  - right: Nanming River, Yu River (Hubei), Ya River

The Wu River (Chinese: 乌江; pinyin: Wū Jiāng) is the longest southern tributary of the Yangtze River. Nearly its entire length of 1,150 kilometres (710 mi) runs within the isolated, mountainous and ethnically diverse province of Guizhou. The river takes drainage from a 80,300-square-kilometre (31,000 mi^{2}) watershed.

The river flows through the Liupanshui, Anshun, Guiyang (the capital), Qiannan, and Zunyi Districts of Guizhou. All nine regions of the province have at least partial drainage to the river.

== Course ==
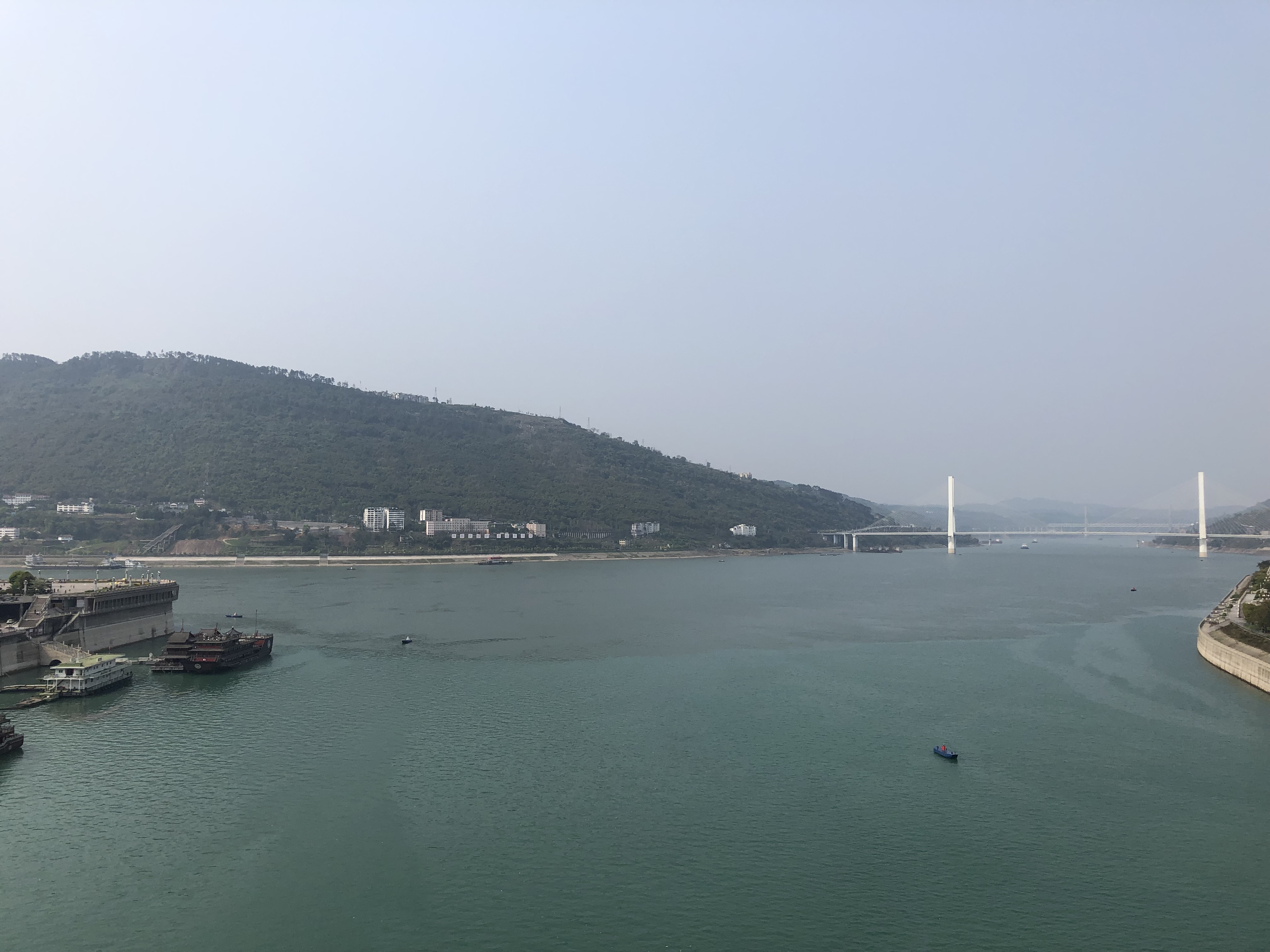
Fuling where Yangtze River and Wu River converge

The river begins as the Sancha in western Guizhou and flows eastwards about 350 km (220 mi). It then bends north, west and south in a 300 km (190 mi) reach called the Yachi, and receives the Nanming River from the right. After the Yachi reach, the Wu makes a broad arc northeast through central Guizhou, picking up fifteen major tributaries including the Yu, Furong and Ya Rivers and flowing through several large hydroelectric dams. It then crosses the border into the provincial-level municipality of Chongqing, flows past Wulong, and empties into the Yangtze River at Fuling, some 50 miles (80 km) east-northeast of Chongqing. Part of the lower course of the river is flooded by the reservoir of Three Gorges Dam.

== History ==
Many small river towns along the Wu, such as Gongtan, date back to as early as 200 A.D. Fuling is regarded as the first major town to be built on the river. The city was the capital of the ancient Ba state in the Sichuan area. During the Qin dynasty, the region was brought under Chinese control.

== River modifications ==
The Wu River has been extensively developed for hydroelectricity generation. As of 2010, dams along the river had a combined capacity of 8,500 megawatts (MW). Much of this development is extremely recent, as power generation in 2010 was over four times of that in 2005. Most dams on the river were constructed and owned by the Wujiang Hydropower Corporation. The largest dam, the 232-metre (761 ft) Goupitan Dam, was completed in 2011. Aside from producing power, dams on the Wu River also provide flood control and hydraulic head for irrigation operations.

The lower reaches of the river are heavily polluted because of poor sewage systems and dumping of agricultural waste – so much that it is not even considered suitable for irrigation and industrial purposes.

In late 2008, geological instabilities caused landslides with volumes of 20,000 and 50,000 cubic metres (26,000 and 65,000 yd^{3}). It is speculated that the former slide is part of a larger unstable slope with as much as 100,000 cubic metres (130,000 yd^{3}). The latter slide caused a wave that swamped boats up to 2 kilometres (1.2 mi) away.

The 10 dams on the river that are either completed, under construction or planned, as of March 2014, are listed below from downstream to upstream.

- Daxikou Dam – Cancelled, 1,200 MW
- Baimato Dam – Programmed, 350 MW
- Yinpan Dam – Completed, 600 MW
- Pengshui Dam – Completed, 1,750 MW
- Shatuo Dam – Completed, 1,120 MW
- Silin Dam – Completed, 1,050 MW
- Goupitan Dam – Completed, 3,000 MW
- Wujiangdu Dam – Completed, 1,250 MW
- Suofengying Dam – Completed, 600 MW
- Dongfeng Dam – Completed, 695 MW

=== Navigation ===
In the 1950s, local governments began an ambitious project to increase the navigability of the Wu River. The lower 480 kilometres (300 mi) of the river were dredged of sediment and hundreds of sets of rapids were destroyed by explosive charges. Navigation on the upper river, in contrast, reflects the difficulty of traversing the Yangtze in the Three Gorges region before the construction of Three Gorges Dam. With the creation of the reservoir behind this dam, navigation on the lower reaches of the Wu has increased significantly.

== Bridges ==
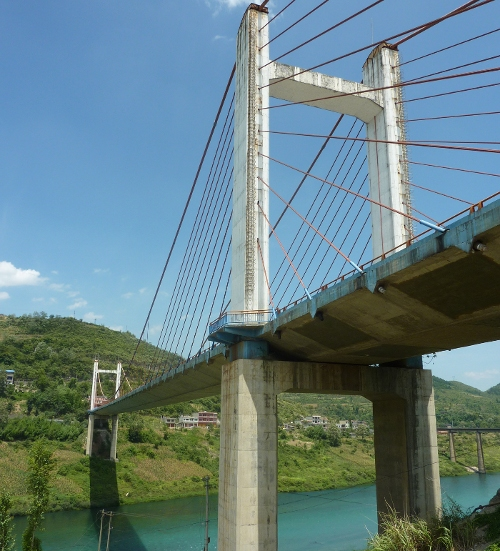
The Zunyi Bridge over the Wu River

There are many spectacular bridges along the course of the Wu River. These include (from mouth heading upstream):

- Fuling Arch Bridge
- Fuling Wu River Bridge
- Jiangjiehe Bridge
- Zunyi Bridge
- Wujiang Viaduct
- Liuguanghe Xiqian Expressway Bridge under construction
- Liuguanghe Bridge
- Yachi Railway Bridge under construction
- Yachi Bridge
- Najiehe Railway Bridge
- Dimuhe River Bridge

== See also ==
- List of rivers of China
