= Beipan River Bridge =

Beipan River Bridge or Beipanjiang Bridge can refer to a number of bridges that cross the Beipan River in China.

- Duge Bridge, till September 2025 the world's highest bridge
- Qinglong Railway Bridge
- Beipan River Guanxing Highway Bridge world's highest bridge from 2003 to 2005
- Beipan River Shuibai Railway Bridge the world's highest railway bridge from 2001 to 2016
- Beipan River Hukun Expressway Bridge
