= LPF =

LPF may refer to:

- IATA airport code for Liupanshui Yuezhao Airport, China
- League for Programming Freedom, an organization promoting free software
- Lembaga Penapis Filem, or the Film Censorship Board of Malaysia
- Level playing field
- Libertarian Party of Florida
- Lietuvos plaukimo federacija, Lithuanian Swimming Federation
- Liga Panameña de Fútbol, a professional football league in Panama
- Liga Profesional de Fútbol, or Argentine Primera División, a professional football league in Argentina
- Liga Profesionistă de Fotbal, a professional football league governing body in Romania
- Light press fit, an interference fit in engineering
- Linux packet filter in computing
- LISA Pathfinder, a European Space Agency spacecraft
- Liters per flush, as shown on American urinals "1 gpf/3.7 lpf"
- Low-pass filter, type of signal filter in acoustics
- Low-power field, in microscopic examination, a wide field of view due to a low level of magnification
- Nissan Stadium (Nashville) (formerly LP Field), a stadium in Tennessee; home of the Tennessee Titans
- Pim Fortuyn List, former Dutch political party
- Luke Priddis Foundation, an organisation Luke Priddis, an Australian former professional rugby league footballer, founded in 2006
