= Huajiang Canyon Bridge =

Suspension bridge in Guizhou, China

Huajiang Canyon Bridge 花江峡谷大桥
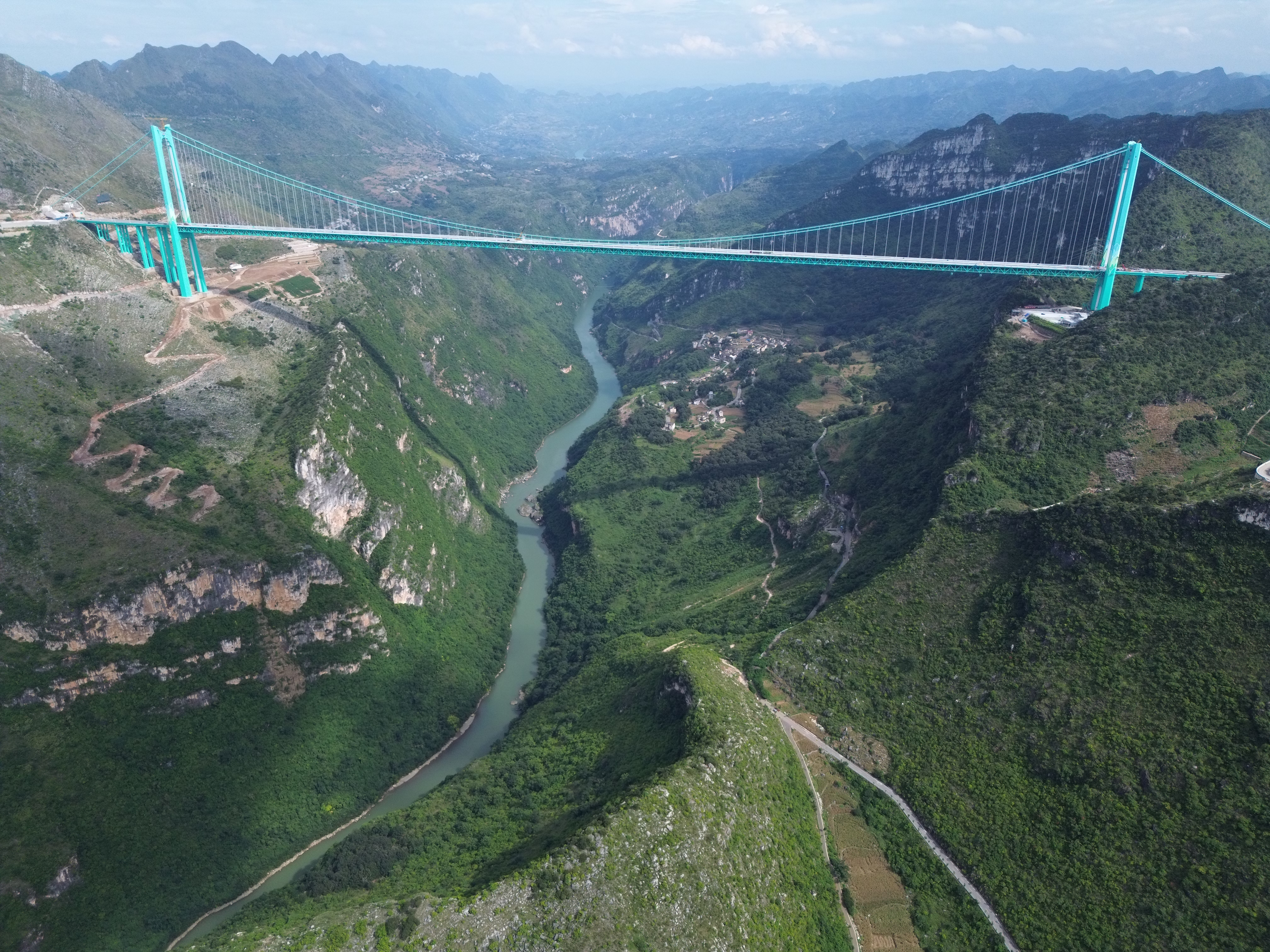
- Coordinates: 25°42′17″N 105°35′17″E
- Carries: S57 Liuzhi-Anlong Expressway
- Crosses: Beipan River
- Locale: Guanling County–Zhenfeng County, Guizhou, China

Characteristics
- Design: Suspension
- Total length: 2,890 metres (9,480 ft)
- Height: 262 metres (860 ft) (north tower); 205 metres (673 ft) (south tower)
- Longest span: 1,420 metres (4,660 ft)
- Clearance below: 625 metres (2,051 ft)
- No. of lanes: 4

History
- Constructed by: Guizhou Bridge Group
- Construction start: 18 January 2022
- Construction end: 28 September 2025
- Construction cost: 2.1 billion RMB

Location
- Interactive map of Huajiang Canyon Bridge

The Huajiang Canyon Bridge (Chinese: 花江峡谷大桥) is an alpine suspension bridge in Guizhou province, China, that opened in late September 2025. The bridge crosses the Beipan River as it passes through the deep Huajiang Canyon and is the world's highest bridge, measuring 625 metres (2,051 ft) from the bridge deck to the bottom of the gorge. It surpassed the previous highest bridge, the Duge Bridge, which crosses the same river 200 kilometres (120 mi) upstream. The bridge was opened to the public on 28 September 2025.

== Background ==
Among the reasons for the construction of the bridge were the revitalization of Guizhou, a very remote and poor mountainous province, and the promotion of tourism, with the projected creation of a center for extreme sports at the bottom of the canyon. Guizhou has been economically depressed, exceptionally rugged, and for much of its history isolated from the rest of China by its karst topography. The canyon crossing time, which previously took 70 minutes via mountain passes and ferries, was reduced to just over one minute via the new alpine highway.

== Construction ==
Construction began on 18 January 2022. On 21 April 2023, the first tower of the suspended part reached 199 metres (653 ft) in height and the construction of the upper transverse beam had begun.

On 21 August 2025, the Huajiang Canyon Bridge started its load test. The test was successfully completed on 25 August 2025. The bridge was opened officially on 28 September 2025.

== Characteristics ==
The bridge has a total length of 2,890 metres (9,480 ft), including a main span of 1,420 metres (4,660 ft). It is supported by one 262-metre-tall (860 ft) tower on the north side and a 205-meter-tall (673 ft) tower on the south side. As a result, the difference in altitude between the deck and the water level of the river reaches 625 metres (2,051 ft), a world record.

The bridge carries the Guizhou S57 Liuzhi-Anlong Expressway highway connecting Liuzhi Special District and Anlong County.

A fibre-optic load cell cable is embedded in three of the 217 carrying cable strands to provide live monitoring of the bridge state.

== Water curtain ==
During excavation of the tunnel at the bridgehead, the construction team encountered a flow of karst groundwater. Rather than discharging it from the tunnel as waste, the engineers diverted the water into a newly built reservoir at the bridgehead with a capacity of 4,000 cubic meters (140,000 cu ft). The captured water supplies the bridge's service area, irrigates farmland and orchards on the Guanling side of the canyon, and, using the surplus, feeds a water-curtain feature mounted along the deck.

The water curtain is about 300 meters (980 ft) wide, and its height can be adjusted up to nearly 100 meters (330 ft) by varying the spray pressure. Released from the 625-meter (2,051 ft) deck, the cascade has been described by Chinese state media as the world's highest artificial waterfall. After dark the curtain becomes the surface for a combined water, light, and sound show staged as part of the bridge's "bridge-tourism integration" (桥旅融合) program, with two performances held each day. The light-show contract was awarded to the listed lighting company Howsolar (SZSE: 002963), which planned to use laser projection on the 300-meter (980 ft) water screen.

== Tourism ==
At the level below the car deck, there is a glass sightseeing walkway. There is a glass-enclosed elevator and staircase beside one of the bridge towers. On top of one of the bridge towers there is a specialty coffeehouse with panoramic views, 800 metres above valley floor. The bridge has facilities for extreme sports such as bungee jumping and paragliding integrated by design. It also includes the Bridge Science Museum, which offers interactive displays showcasing complex engineering and the building process behind the world’s highest bridge. The Huajiang Canyon bridge was created on September 28, 2025, and as of its opening through August 2026 the bridge has amassed about 3.3 million visitors. The surrounding area around the bridge has also seen a massive surge in visitors after the creation of the Huajiang Canyon Bridge.

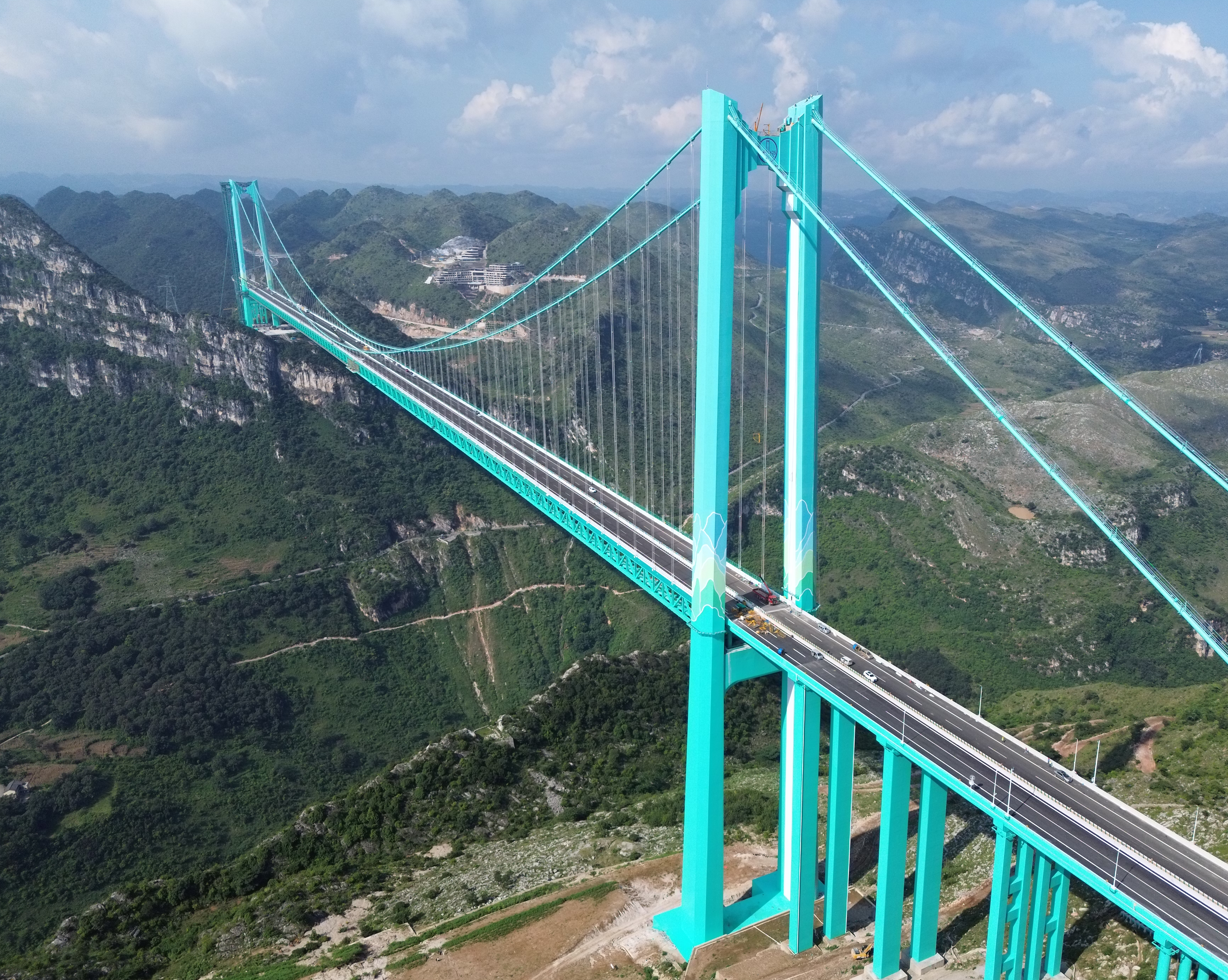
The bridge in September 2025

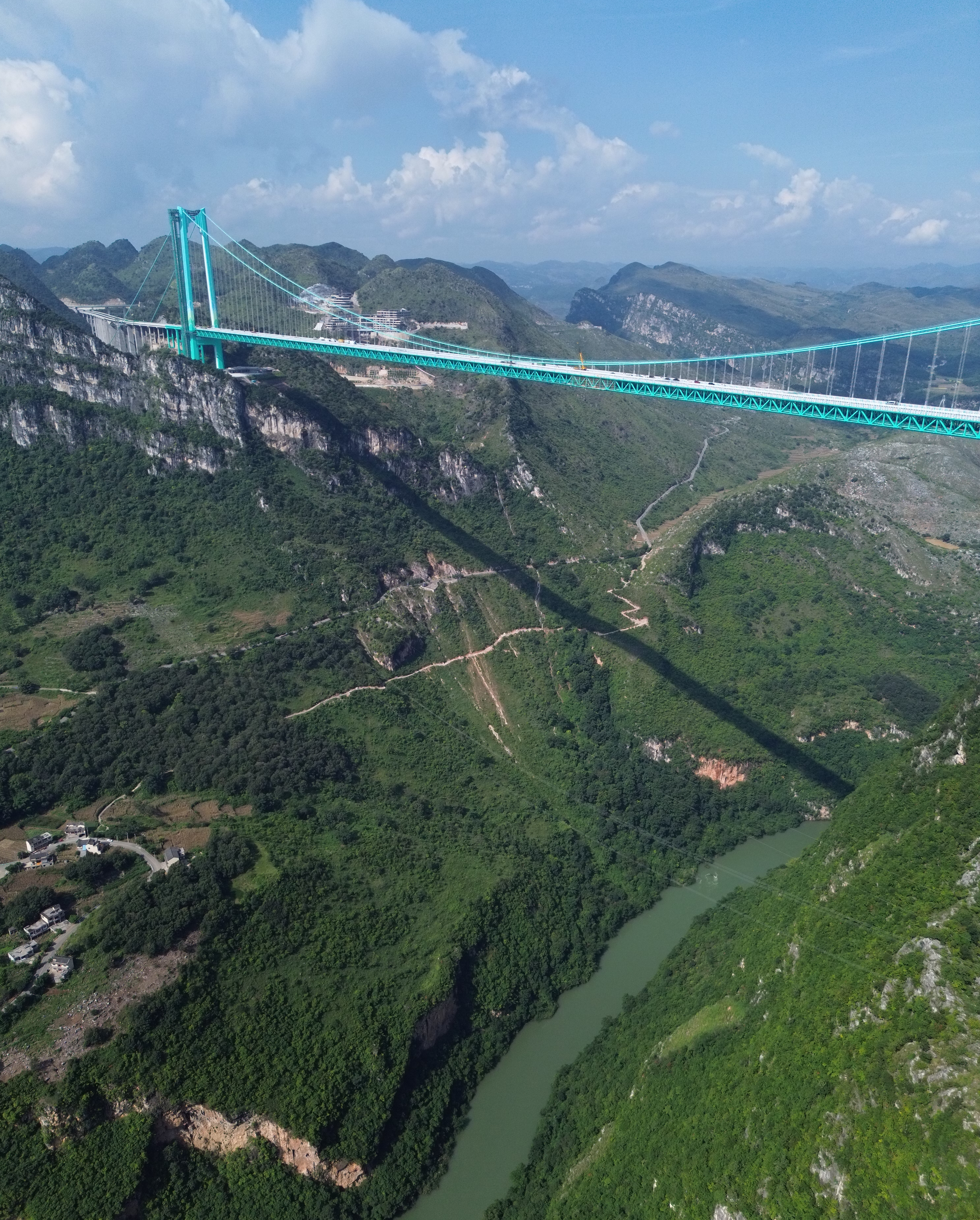
The bridge in September 2025

== See also ==
- List of bridges in China
- List of highest bridges
- List of tallest bridges
- List of longest suspension bridge spans
