= Guangzhao Dam =

- Location within China
- Country: China
- Location: Qinglong and Guanling Buyei and Miao Autonomous Counties, Guizhou Province
- Coordinates: 25°57′34″N 105°15′03″E
- Status: In use
- Construction began: May 2003
- Opening date: 2008

Dam and spillways
- Type of dam: Gravity
- Impounds: Beipan River
- Height: 200.5 metres (658 ft)
- Length: 410 metres (1,345 ft)
- Dam volume: 2,800,000 cubic metres (98,881,067 ft^{3})
- Spillways: 3
- Spillway type: Service, surface crest
- Spillway capacity: 9,857 cubic metres per second (348,097 cu ft/s)

Reservoir
- Creates: Guangzhao Reservoir
- Total capacity: 3,254,000,000 cubic metres (2,638,061 acre⋅ft)
- Catchment area: 13,548 square kilometres (5,231 sq mi)
- Surface area: 51.54 square kilometres (20 sq mi)

Power Station
- Installed capacity: 1,040 MW
- Annual generation: 2,745 GWh (mean)

The Guangzhao Dam is a concrete gravity dam on the Beipan River, on the border between Qinglong County and Guanling Buyei and Miao Autonomous County, in Guizhou Province, China. The main purpose of the project is hydroelectric power generation with additional purposes of water regulation and irrigation. It creates the uppermost or head reservoir on the Beipan and was constructed between 2003 and 2008.

== Construction ==
Construction on the dam began in May 2003 and the river was diverted in October 2004. Reservoir filling began in 2007 and by 2008, the dam and power plant were complete. On June 28, 2010, a landslide in the area of the dam that killed 99 locals was believed to be caused by seismic effects from the reservoir.

== Specifications ==
The dam is 200.5 metres (658 ft) tall and 410 metres (1,345 ft) wide and composed of roller-compacted concrete. It also contains three spillway chutes on its surface. Each spillway is controlled by a 16 metres (52 ft) wide and 20 metres (66 ft) tall floodgate and they have a combined maximum discharge of 9,857 cubic metres per second (348,097 cu ft/s). The dam also contains a bottom outlet works for draining the reservoir which a maximum discharge capacity of 799 cubic metres per second (28,216 cu ft/s).

== See also ==
- List of power stations in China
