= Weishe–Hongguo railway =

Railway line in Guizhou, China

The Weishe–Hongguo railway or Weihong railway (simplified Chinese: 威红铁路; traditional Chinese: 威紅鐵路; pinyin: wēihóng tiělù), is a branch railroad of the Nanning–Kunming railway in Guizhou province of Southwest China. The Weihong Line branches off of the main Nankun Line at Weishe Township in Xingyi municipality and runs north to Hongguo Township in Liupanshui municipality, where the line connects to the Pan County West Railway. The Weishe–Hongguo railway was built as part of the Nankun railway, which was constructed from 1990 to 1997.

== Rail connections ==
- Hongguo: Pan County West Railway
- Weishe (Xingyi): Nanning–Kunming railway

== See also ==
- List of railways in China
