= Panxi railway =

Railway line in China

The Pan County west railway or Panxi railway (simplified Chinese: 盘西铁路; traditional Chinese: 盘西鐵路; pinyin: pánxī tiělù), is a single-track electrified railroad in Southwest China between Zhanyi County in eastern Yunnan province and Baiguo Township in Pan County in western Guizhou province. The line is 136.3 km (85 mi) in length and was built during the Cultural Revolution from 1966 to 1975 to exploit coal fields in western Guizhou and support inland industries as part of the Third Front campaign by the Chinese government to develop industrial facilities in the country's interior. The line's name is derived from the fact that the railway from Hongguo to Baiguo, runs along the western border of Pan County. The Panxi line was electrified in 2001 and permits trains from Chengdu to reach the seaport at Fangchenggang by following the Neijiang–Kunming railway, Liupanshui–Baiguo railway, Panxi and Weishe–Hongguo railway lines to the Nanning–Kunming railway at Weishe, saving 279 km (173 mi) by traveling via the Chengdu–Kunming railway to the Nankun line at Kunming. Notable stations along the route include Zhanyi, Fucheng County, Hongguo Township and Baiguo Township.

== Rail connections ==
- Zhanyi: Shanghai–Kunming railway
- Hongguo: Weishe–Hongguo railway
- Baiguo: Liupanshui–Baiguo railway

== See also ==
- List of railways in China
