= Beipan River =

River in Guizhou and Yunnan, China

Coordinates: 24.956°N 106.141°E

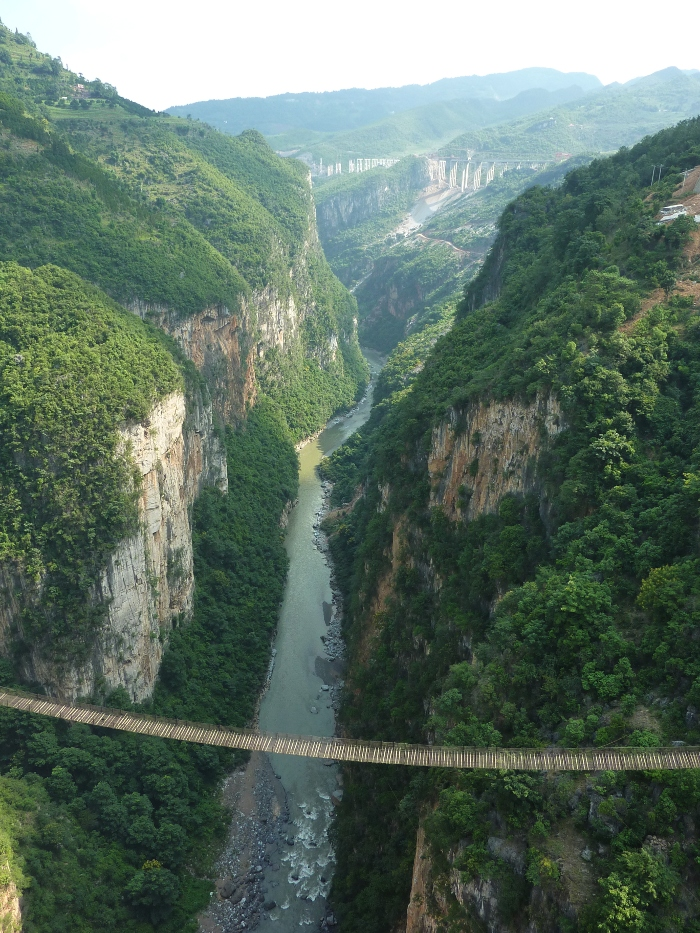
- Beipan River canyon near Liupanshui

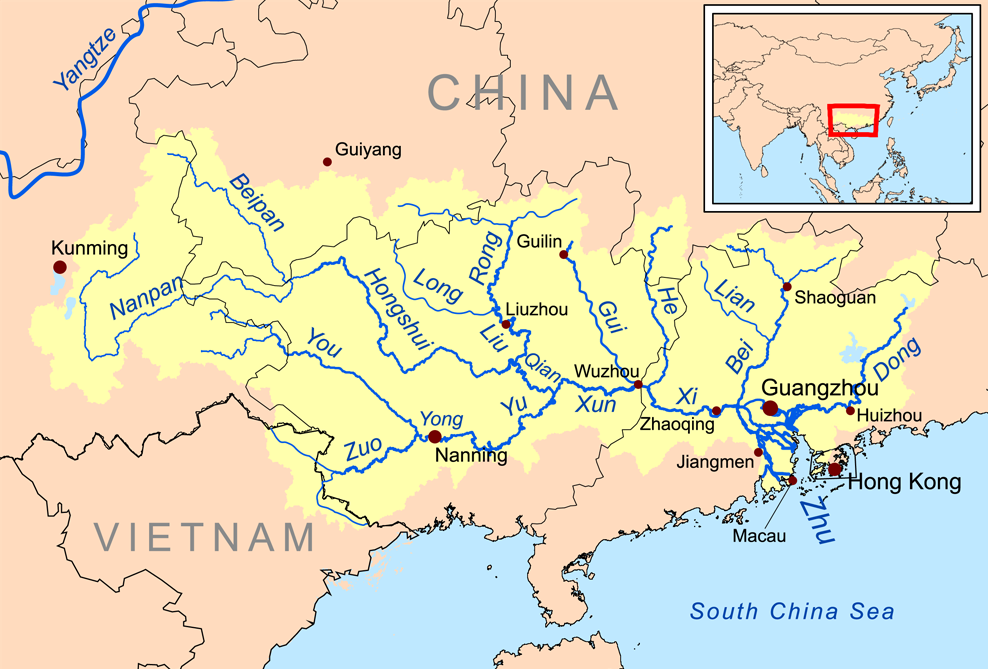
- The Pearl River system with the Beipan River in the top left

Location
- Country: China

Beipan River (Chinese: 北盘江; pinyin: Běipán Jiāng) is a river in Guizhou and Yunnan provinces, China, and part of the great Pearl River basin.

== Other names ==
The upper reaches in Yunnan and Guizhou were once known as the Zangke River.

== Course ==
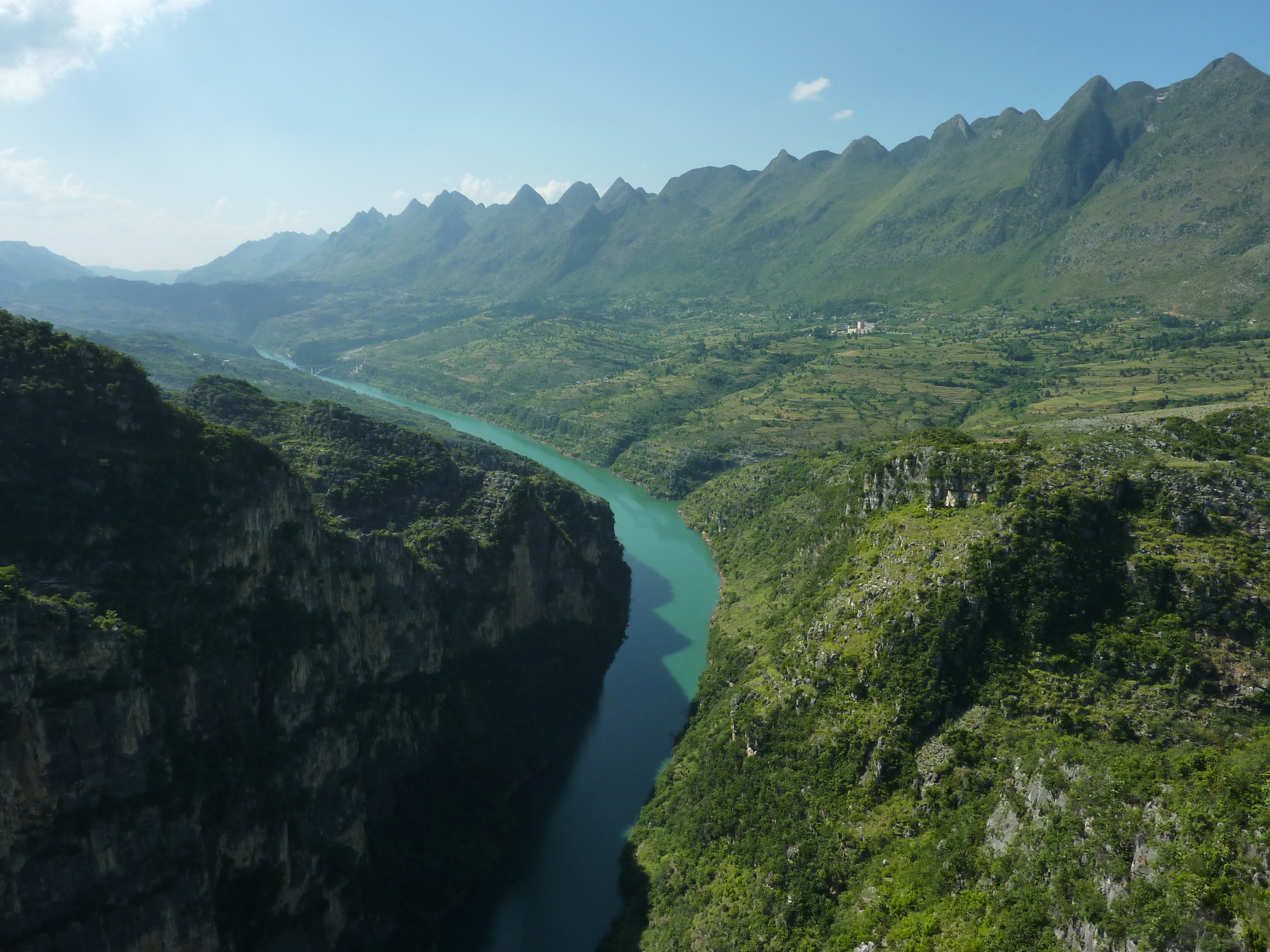
The Beipan River from the Beipan River Suspension Bridge (built 2003) in Zhenfeng County.

The Beipan River passes through the modern Chinese provinces of Yunnan and Guizhou. When reaching the border of Guangxi, the Beipan River (literally, the Northern Pan River) merges with the Nanpan River (the Southern Pan River), forming the Hongshui River, which continues to the southeast.

== History ==
The river was significant in history as a communications pathway between the Yelang and Nanyue kingdoms.

== Bridges ==
The river is crossed by the world's highest bridge, the Huajiang Canyon Bridge, as well as the world's second highest bridge, the Duge Bridge. It is also crossed by the Qinglong Railway Bridge, the Guanxing Highway via the Beipan River Guanxing Highway Bridge, the Liupanshui-Baiguo Railway via the Beipan River Shuibai Railway Bridge, and the G60 Hukun Expressway via the Beipan River Hukun Expressway Bridge. All of these bridges are among the highest in the world.

There are other bridges under construction over the river that are also extremely high:

- Beipan River Shuipan Expressway Bridge
- Beipan River Wang'an Highway Bridge

== Dams ==
There are a number of dams along the river including the Guangzhao Dam.

== See also ==
- List of rivers in China
