= Guanxing Highway =

Road in Guizhou, China

Guanxing Highway (simplified Chinese: 关兴高速公路; traditional Chinese: 關興高速公路) connects Guanling County and the city of Xingyi, both within Guizhou Province of China.

== Bridge ==
The highway crosses the Beipan River on the Beipan River Guanxing Highway Bridge. It was the highest bridge in the world from 2003 to 2005.

== See also ==
- Transport in Guizhou
- Xingyi topics
