= Yongning, Guizhou =

Yongning 永宁镇
- Town
- Location within Guizhou Location within China
- Coordinates: 25°54′28″N 105°29′7″E
- Country: People's Republic of China
- Province: Guizhou
- Prefecture-level city: Anshun
- Autonomous county: Guanling Buyei and Miao Autonomous County
- Time zone: UTC+8 (China Standard)

Yongning (simplified Chinese: 永宁; traditional Chinese: 永寧; pinyin: Yǒngníng) is a town under the administration of Guanling Buyei and Miao Autonomous County, Guizhou, China. As of 2018, it has one residential community and 11 villages under its administration.

== See also ==
- List of township-level divisions of Guizhou
