= Liupanshui Yuezhao Airport =

Liupanshui Yuezhao Airport 六盘水月照机场
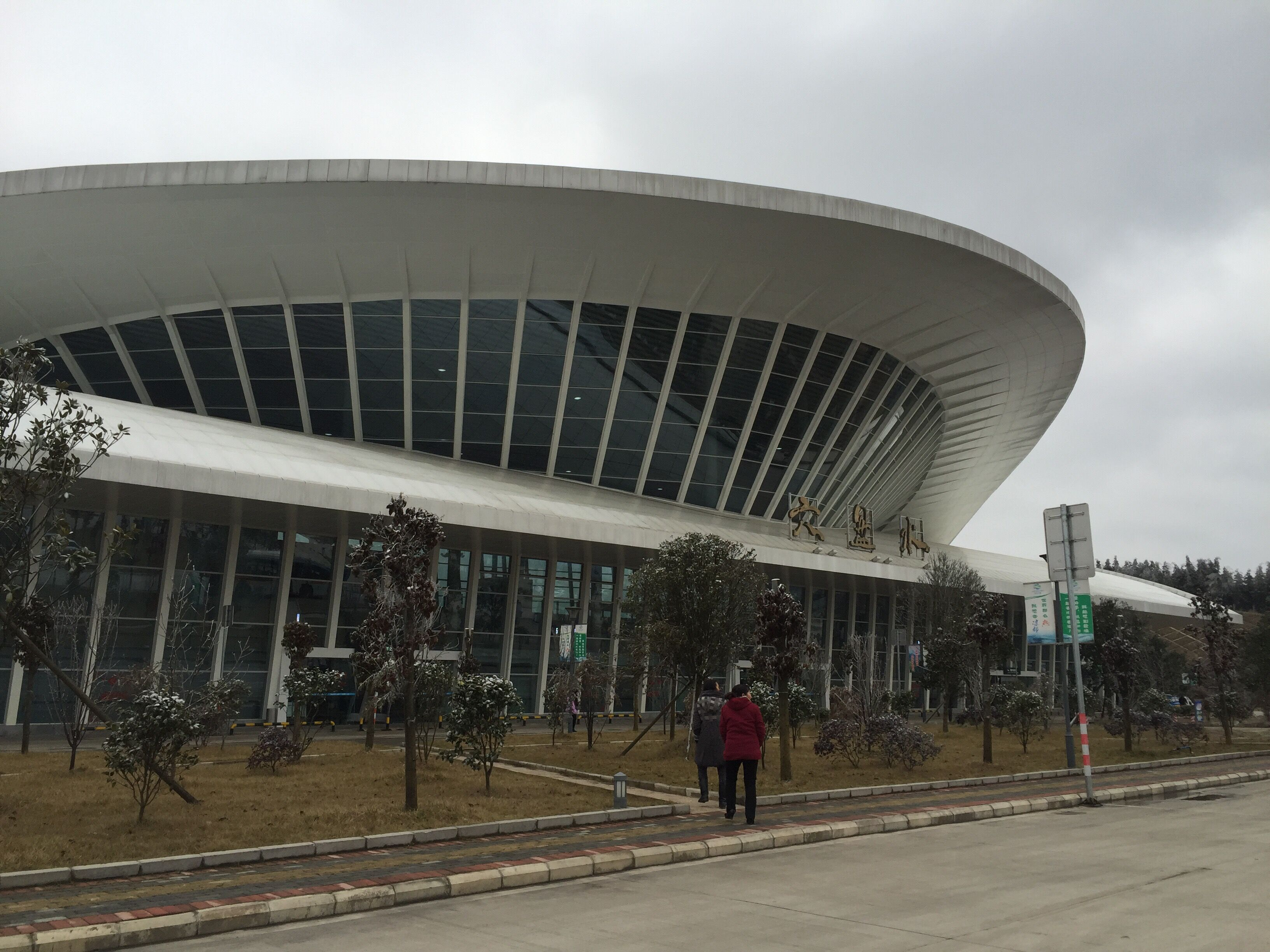
- IATA: LPF; ICAO: ZUPS

Summary
- Airport type: Public
- Operator: Liupanshui Yuezhao Airport Limited Company
- Serves: Liupanshui, Guizhou, China
- Location: Yuezhao Township
- Opened: 28 November 2014; 11 years ago
- Coordinates: 26°36′33.9″N 104°58′44.4″E
- Website: lpsairport.gzlps.gov.cn

Map
- Location of airport in Guizhou

Runways
Direction	Length		Surface
Direction	m	ft	Surface
05/23	2,500	8,202	Concrete

Statistics (2021)
- Passengers: 114,850
- Aircraft movements: 2,123
- Cargo (metric tons): 55.4

Liupanshui Yuezhao Airport
- Simplified Chinese: 六盘水月照机场
- Traditional Chinese: 六盤水月照機場
Transcriptions
Standard Mandarin
- Hanyu Pinyin: Liùpánshuǐ Yuèzhào Jīchǎng

Liupanshui Yuezhao Airport (IATA: LPF, ICAO: ZUPS) is an airport serving the city of Liupanshui in western Guizhou Province, China. It is located in Yuezhao Township, Zhongshan District and Dongdi Township, Shuicheng County, 15 kilometers from the city center by road. Construction began on September 26, 2011 with a total investment of 1.3 billion yuan, and the airport was opened on 28 November 2014.

Construction of the airport has been linked to corruption cases against former local officials such as Li Zaiyong. As of 2022, the airport remained underused, serving less than 20,000 passengers yearly.

== Facilities ==
Liupanshui Airport will have a runway that is 2,800 meters long and 45 meters wide (class 4C), capable of handling Boeing 737 and Airbus A320 aircraft, and an 8,000-square-meter terminal building. It is designed to handle 250,000 passengers and 1,250 tons of cargo annually by 2020.

== Airlines and destinations ==
Airlines	Destinations
9 Air	Nanjing

== See also ==
- List of airports in China
- List of the busiest airports in China
