= Liupanshui–Baiguo railway =

Railway line in Guizhou, China

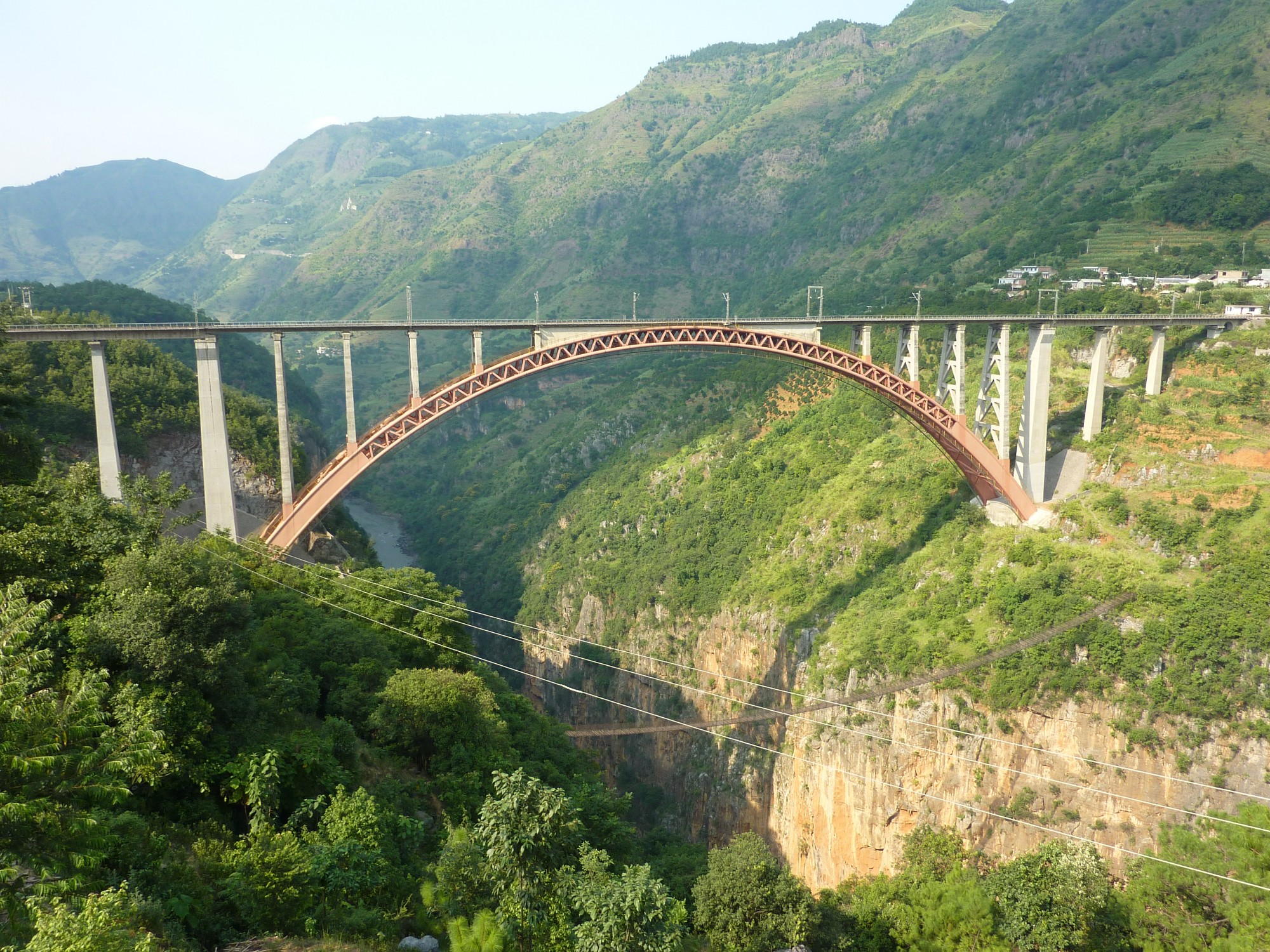
The Beipanjiang River Railway Bridge on the Liupanshui–Baiguo railway is the highest railway bridge in the world.

The Liupanshui–Baiguo railway or Shuibai railway (simplified Chinese: 水柏铁路; traditional Chinese: 水柏鐵路; pinyin: shuǐbái tiělù), is a single-track electrified railroad in western Guizhou province in Southwest China. The line runs 118 km (73 mi) from Baiguo in Pan County to Liupanshui municipality, and was built from 1998 to June 2002. The line cost the equivalent of US$392.6 million (at 2002 exchange rates) and was partially financed by a loan of US$140 million from the Asian Development Bank (ADB). The rail line passes through impoverished areas in the mountains of western Guizhou and was built to promote regional economic development and poverty alleviation. Freight operations began in March 2004 and passenger services followed in early 2005.

In 2004, the 43-km Baiguo-Hongguo section of the Panxi railway was added to the Shuibai line, and the combined line is known as the Liupanshui–Hongguo railway or Shuihong railway.

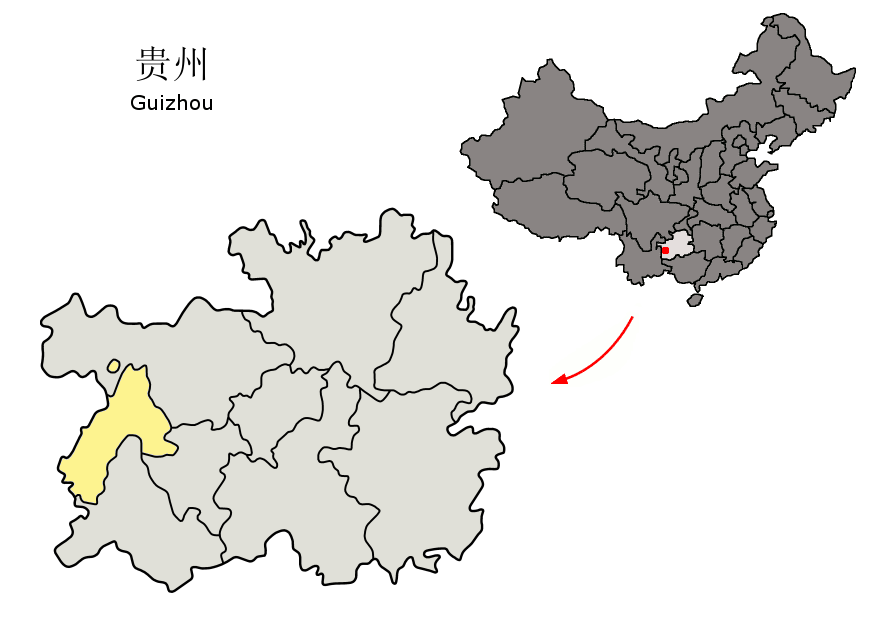
The Liupansui–Baiguo railway, including the Baiguo–Hongguo extension, is located entirely within Liupanshui Prefecture in western Guizhou. Liupanshui Prefecture encompasses Liupanshui municipality and Pan County to the south.

== Route ==
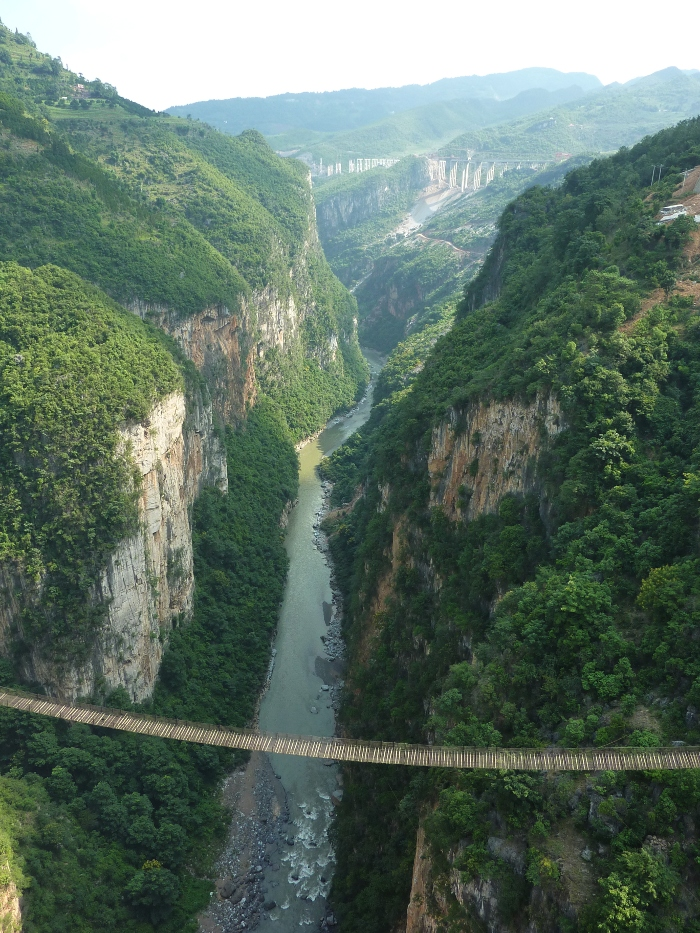
The Liupanshui–Baiguo railway traverses rugged terrain in remote western Guizhou. Pictured is the deep Beipanjiang canyon, near Liupanshui, which the Beipanjiang River Railway Bridge spans.

The line traverses rugged terrain in the Wumeng Mountains of western Guizhou and has 50 tunnels and 102 bridges, which collectively account for 64% of the track length. The arch bridge across the deep canyon of the Beipan River and is the highest railway bridge in the world with its road bed 275 m above the Beipan River below. The remote location of Shuibai line required the building of 220.3 km of access roads to support the railway's construction.

== Operations ==
The Shuibai railway is owned and operated by the Guizhou Shuihong railway Company, Ltd. (GSRC), a state owned joint venture of the Guizhou provincial government and the PRC Ministry of railways. In 2004, the GSRC acquired the 43 km section of the Panxi railway between Baiguo and Hongguo from the MOR to extend service south and draw traffic from the Nanning–Kunming railway. As of 2006, the GSRC operated freight service in coordination with the Chengdu Railway Bureau and passenger service in coordination with the Kunming Railway Bureau.

== History and impact ==
In 1992, the Guizhou Provincial and Liupanshui Municipal Government jointly proposed the Shuibai Railway Project to the National Planning Committee, the institutional predecessor of the National Development and Reform Commission (NDRC). The project was intended create a means to transport coal from mines in western Pan County, boost local economic development and connect the Guiyang-Kunming and Panxi railways. In 1993, the NDRC recommended the project to the State Council. After the State Council gave approval, the project was assessed by the China International Engineering Consulting Corporation. In 1996, the Guizhou Provincial Government, Ministry of railways and Ministry of Coal formed a joint-venture company, the GSRC. The Ministry of Coal eventually withdrew from the venture, leaving the Guizhou government and railway Ministry with 51% / 49% sharehold in the venture.

In 1997, the GSRC sought a development assistance loan from the ADB, which undertook a fact-finding mission. A loan of $140 million was approved in August 1998 and bidding began on the procurement of civil engineering services. Due to the challenging topography which required extensive tunneling and bridge-building, the cost of the railway per kilometer was twice that of a railway built on level ground. Construction began in 1998 and was completed six months ahead of schedule in May 2002, though safety testing continued until September 1, when trial operations began. In November 2002, the Ministry of railways announced the opening of freight transport on the line but commercial full-scale freight operations did not commence until March 1, 2004. Passenger operations began on February 1, 2005.

The total cost of the project was estimated to be $381 million with $170 million in foreign exchange cost. The actual costs of the line was $392.6 million due to higher than anticipated costs of resettlement, project administration, civil works, signaling and electrification. Only $105 million of the ADB loan was actually disbursed as foreign currency costs were lower than expected due to competitive contracting bids. The local currency costs were shared between the GSRC ($138.6 million) and a state development bank ($72.3 million).

In 2007, the ADB undertook an assessment study and determined the project had created a cost-effective mode of transport for mining and industrial outputs and passengers in the region. The report noted the incorporation of the 43-km Hongguo–Baiguo rail line into the operations of the GSRC significantly improved the commercial performance of the line. Delays in the development of coal mines along route had caused freight traffic and income levels to be below anticipated levels. The shortfall was compensated by diversion of additional traffic from congested neighboring railways. No loan covenants were waived or suspended and the GSRC as borrower were in compliance with most covenants, with the exception of the rates for freight and passenger fares which were inadequate to recover capital and operating costs. The lower fares were due in part to the GSRC's use of freight fares to subsidize passenger fares. Overall, the railway experienced significant growth in both freight and passenger traffic. The project was determined to be "relevant, effective, efficient and likely to be sustainable" and therefore "successful."

In the years after the project was completed, local government revenue increased by 94%, average income per worker rose by 95% and the proportion of the local population living below the poverty line fell by 55%.

== Rail connections ==
- Liupanshui: Shanghai–Kunming railway, Neijiang–Kunming railway
- Baiguo: Pan County West (Panxi) railway
- Hongguo: Nanning-Kunming railway

== See also ==
- List of railways in China
