= Qinglong Railway Bridge =

Qinglong Railway Bridge 晴隆北盘江大桥
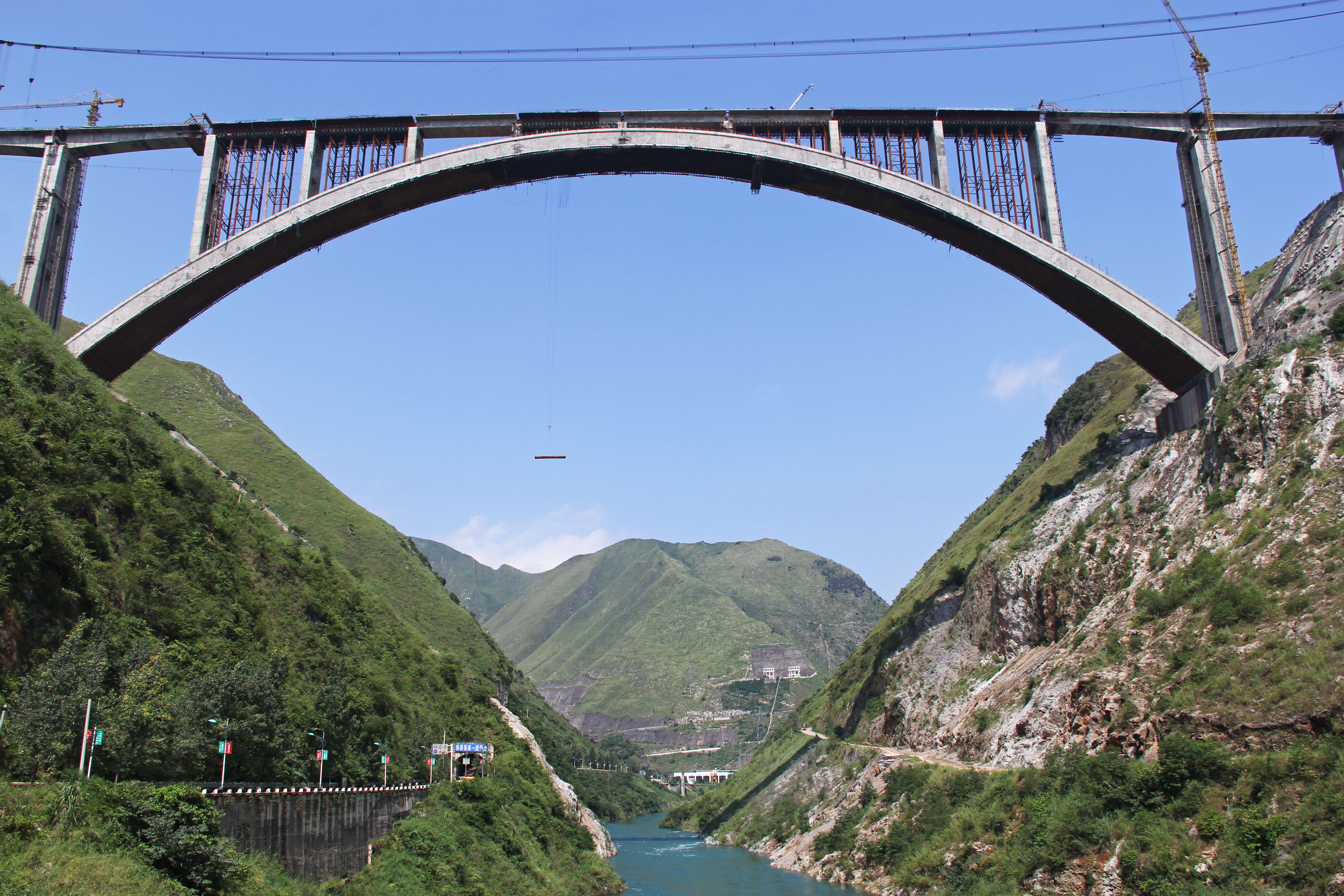
- Coordinates: 25.950°N 105.255°E
- Carries: High speed rail
- Crosses: Beipan River
- Locale: Qinglong County, Guizhou

Characteristics
- Design: Arch
- Material: Concrete
- Total length: 721 m (2,365 ft)
- Height: 295 m (968 ft)
- Longest span: 445 m (1,460 ft)
- Clearance below: 295 m (968 ft)

History
- Opened: 2016

Qinglong Railway Bridge is a concrete arch bridge located in Qinglong County, Guizhou. The bridge carries the high-speed railway line between Guiyang and Kunming. It crosses the Beipan River just downstream of the Guangzhao Dam. The bridge is almost 300 metres above the river. When it opened in 2015, Xinhua News Agency, the state agency of China, described its span as the largest among the concrete railway arch bridges in the world.

== See also ==
- List of highest bridges in the world
- List of longest arch bridge spans
