= Beipan River Shuibai Railway Bridge =

Bridge in Liupanshui, Guizhou, China

Beipan River Shuibai Railway Bridge 北盘江铁路桥
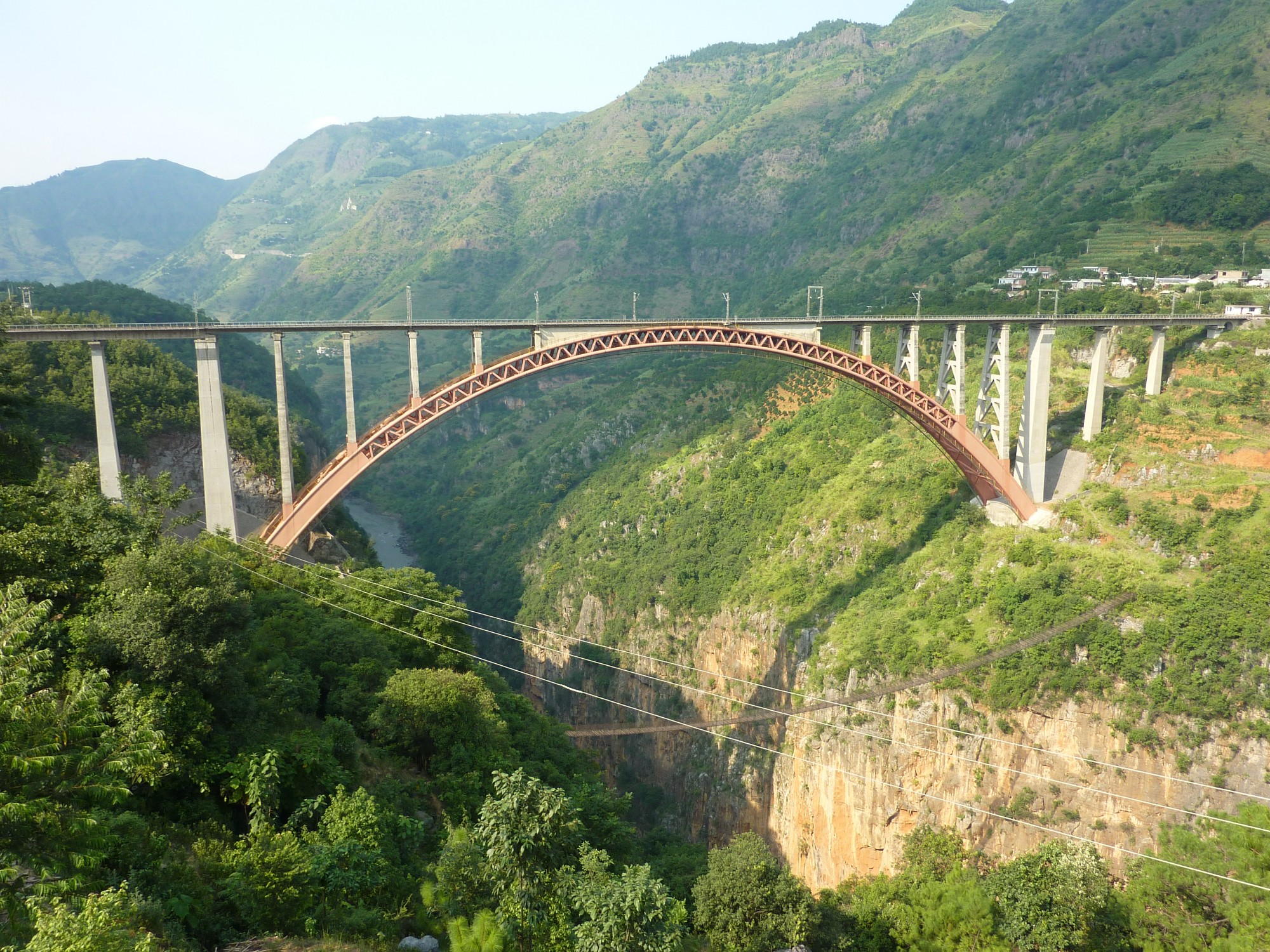
- Coordinates: 26°12′36″N 104°43′14″E
- Carries: Liupanshui–Baiguo railway
- Crosses: Beipan River, (Beipanjiang)
- Locale: Liupanshui in Guizhou province

Characteristics
- Design: Arch
- Total length: 486 metres (1,594 ft)
- Height: 275 metres (902 ft)
- Longest span: 236 metres (774 ft)

History
- Construction start: March 1999
- Opened: November 2001

Location
- Interactive map of Beipan River Shuibai Railway Bridge

The Beipan River Shuibai Railway Bridge in China was the world's highest railway bridge for 15 years, from 2001 to 2016. The bridge spans a deep canyon on the Beipan River near the city of Liupanshui in Guizhou province, China. The arch bridge, with a maximum height of 275 metres and a span width of 236 metres, was built in 2001 with the construction of the Liupanshui–Baiguo railway. Here, the train runs on its highest speed.

== See also ==
- List of highest bridges
- List of longest arch bridge spans
- Beipan River Guanxing Highway Bridge
- Beipan River Hukun Expressway Bridge
