= Duanqiao, Guizhou =

Duanqiao 断桥镇
- Town
- Location within Guizhou Location within China
- Coordinates: 25°53′22″N 105°38′33″E
- Country: People's Republic of China
- Province: Guizhou
- Prefecture-level city: Anshun
- County: Guanling Buyei and Miao Autonomous County
- Time zone: UTC+8 (China Standard)

Duanqiao (simplified Chinese: 断桥; traditional Chinese: 斷橋; pinyin: Duànqiáo) is a town in Guanling Buyei and Miao Autonomous County, Anshun, Guizhou province, China. As of 2018, it had 15 villages under its administration.

== See also ==
- List of township-level divisions of Guizhou
