= Duge Bridge =

Bridge in the provinces of Guizhou and Yunnan, China

Duge Bridge 北盘江第一桥
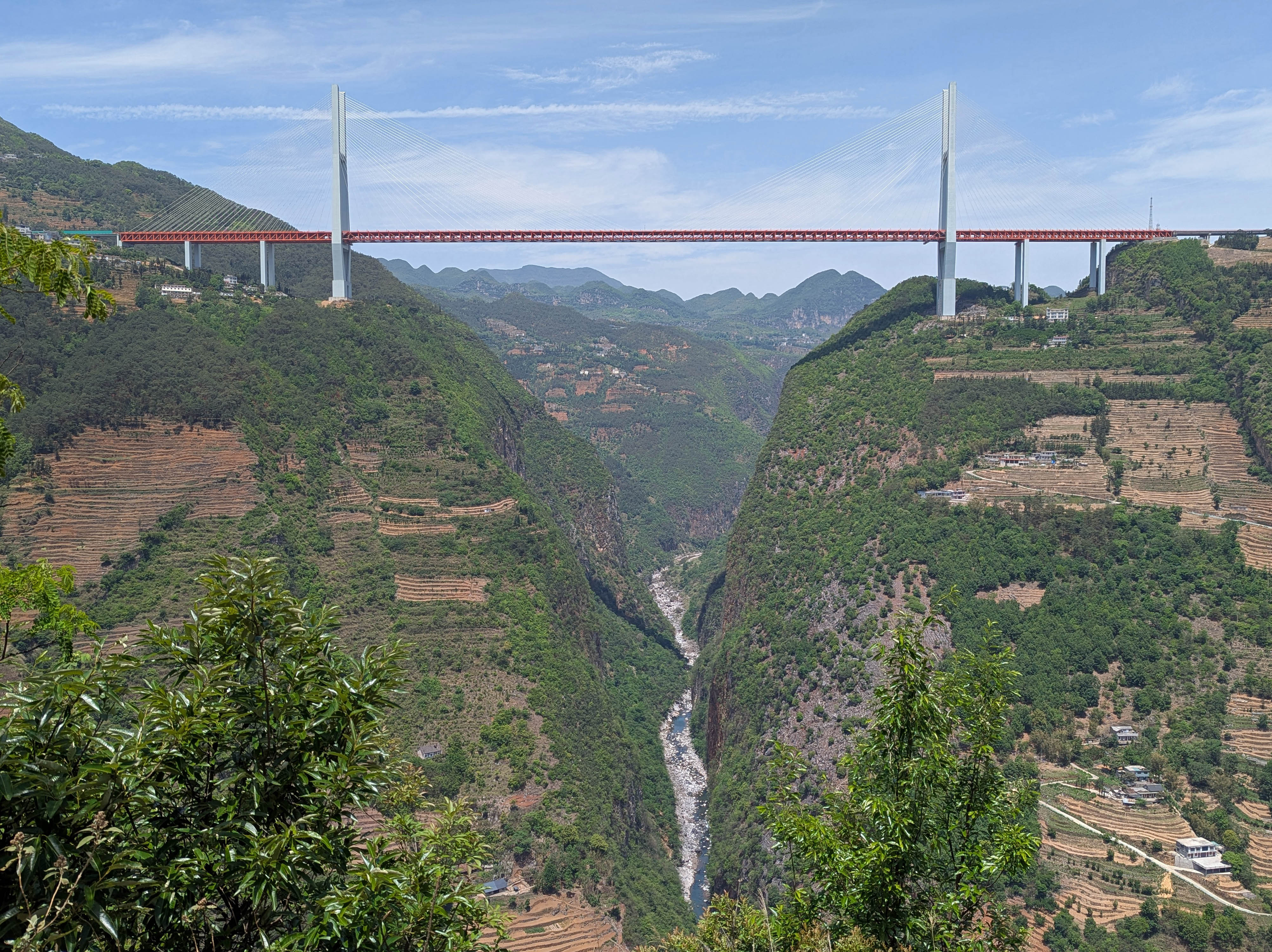
- Coordinates: 26°23′08″N 104°40′26″E
- Carries: G56 Hangzhou–Ruili Expressway
- Crosses: Nizhu River
- Locale: Shuicheng County, Guizhou; Xuanwei, Yunnan, China
- Official name: Beipan River Hangrui Expressway Bridge

Characteristics
- Design: Cable-stayed
- Total length: 1,341 m (4,400 ft)
- Width: 27.9 m (92 ft)
- Height: 269 m (883 ft) (north tower); 248 m (814 ft) (south tower)
- Longest span: 720 m (2,360 ft)
- Clearance below: 565 m (1,854 ft)

History
- Construction end: 10 September 2016
- Opened: 29 December 2016

Location
- Interactive map of Duge Bridge

Beipan River First Bridge
- Simplified Chinese: 北盘江第一桥
- Traditional Chinese: 北盤江第一橋
Transcriptions
Standard Mandarin
- Hanyu Pinyin: Běipán Jiāng Dìyīqiáo

Beipan River Large Bridge
- Simplified Chinese: 北盘江特大桥
- Traditional Chinese: 北盤江特大橋
Transcriptions
Standard Mandarin
- Hanyu Pinyin: Běipán Jiāng tèdàqiáo

Duge Beipan River Bridge
- Simplified Chinese: 都格北盘江大桥
- Traditional Chinese: 都格北盤江大橋
Transcriptions
Standard Mandarin
- Hanyu Pinyin: Dūgé Běipán Jiāng Dàqiáo

Hang(zhou)–Rui(li) Expressway Beipan River Bridge
- Simplified Chinese: 杭瑞高速北盘江大桥
- Traditional Chinese: 杭瑞高速北盤江大橋
Transcriptions
Standard Mandarin
- Hanyu Pinyin: Háng–Ruì gāosù Běipán Jiāng Dàqiáo

The Duge Bridge ([tú.kɤ̌]), also called the Beipanjiang Bridge, is a four-lane cable-stayed bridge on the border between the provinces of Guizhou and Yunnan in China. It spans the deep gorge of the Nizhu River (a tributary of the Beipan), near the town of Duge.

The bridge was the highest in the world, with the road deck sitting over 565 metres (1,854 ft) above the floor of the gorge, from 2016 until 2025, when it was surpassed by the Huajiang Canyon Bridge, which crosses the Beipan river some 200 kilometres (120 mi) downstream. The bridge is part of the G56 Hangzhou–Ruili Expressway between Qujing and Liupanshui. The eastern tower measures 269 m (883 ft), making it one of the tallest in the world, although it is 74 m (243 ft) shorter than the 2004 Millau Viaduct's tallest pier.

== Construction ==
Construction began in 2011 and the bridge was completed on 10 September 2016. It was opened to the public on 29 December 2016. It cost a total of ¥1.023 billion. It was recognized by Guinness World Records as the world's highest bridge in 2018.

== Gallery ==
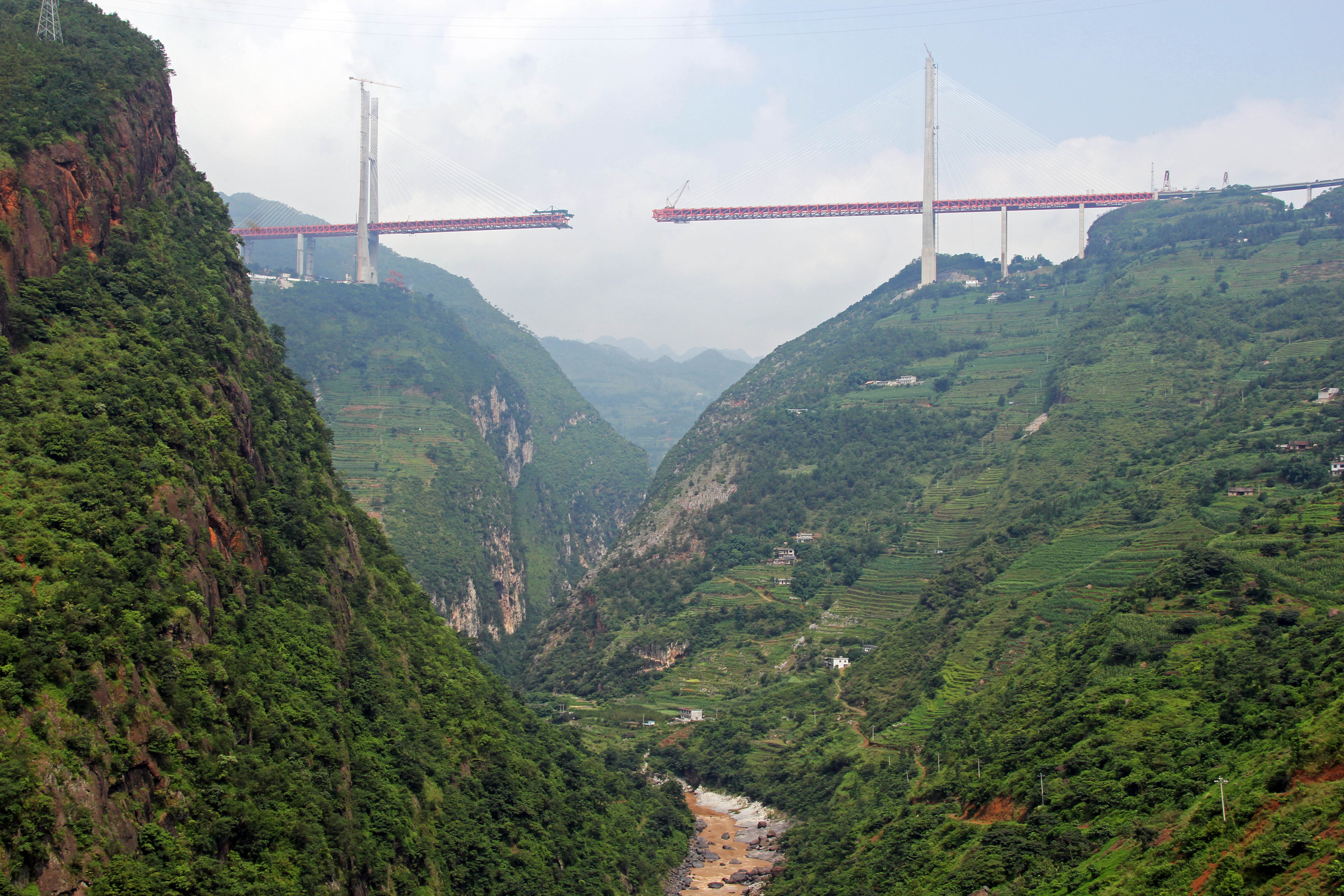
Under construction

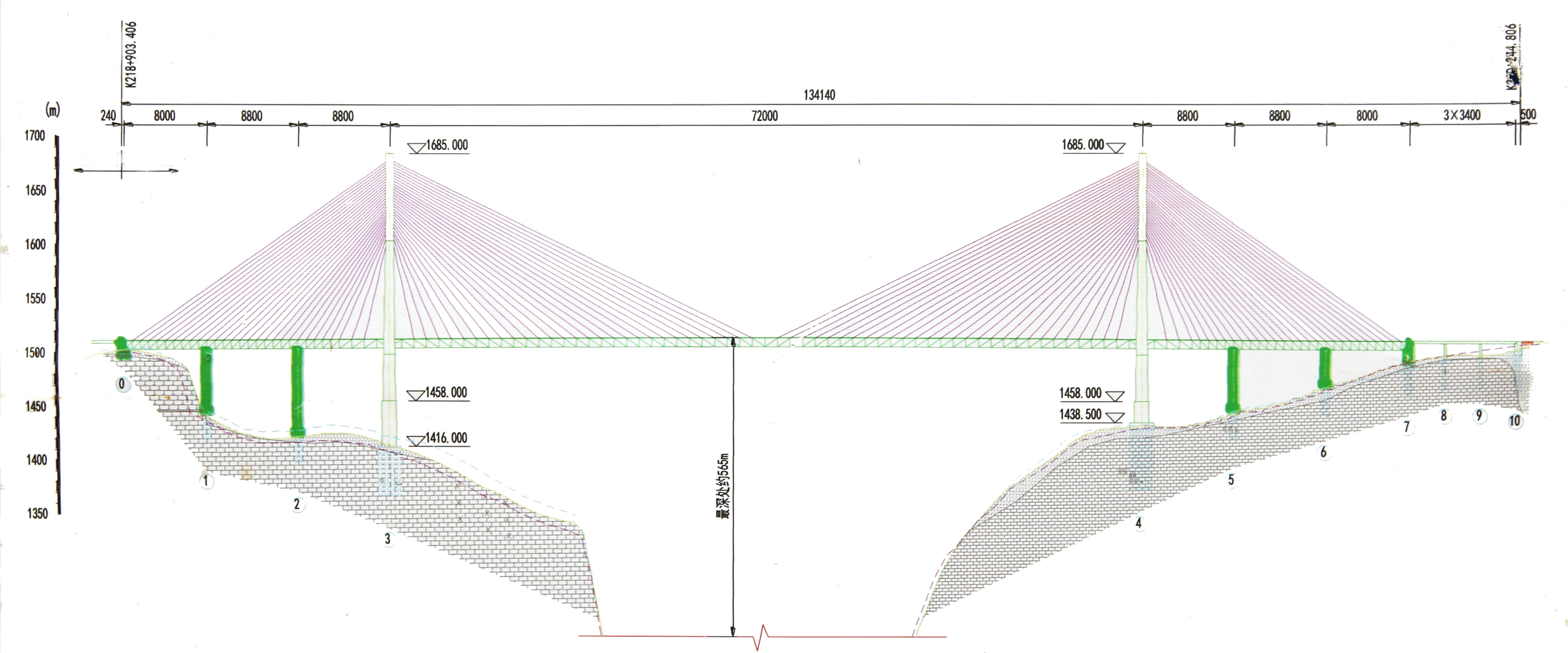
Duge Bridge dimensions; horizontal measurements are in centimetres

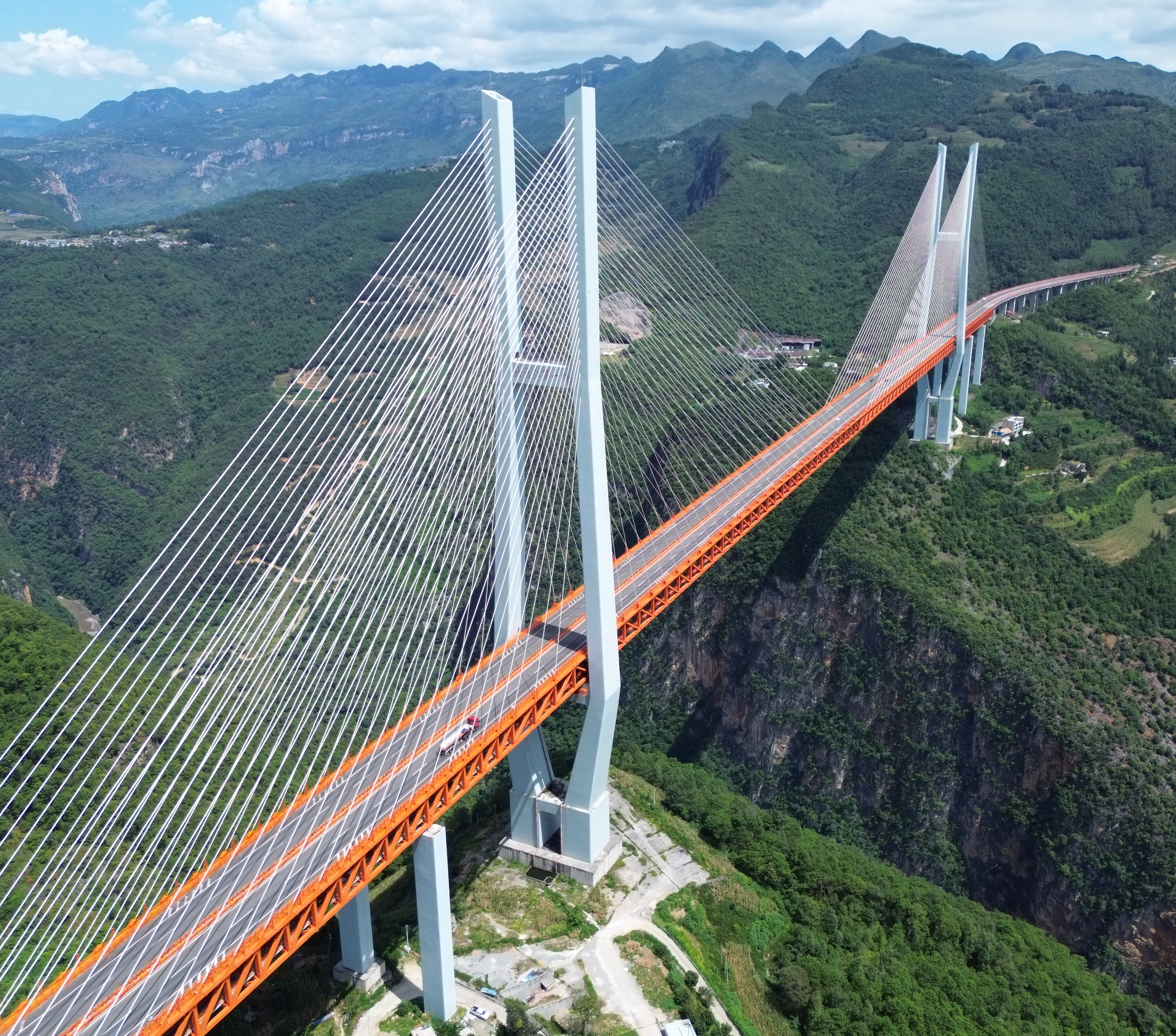

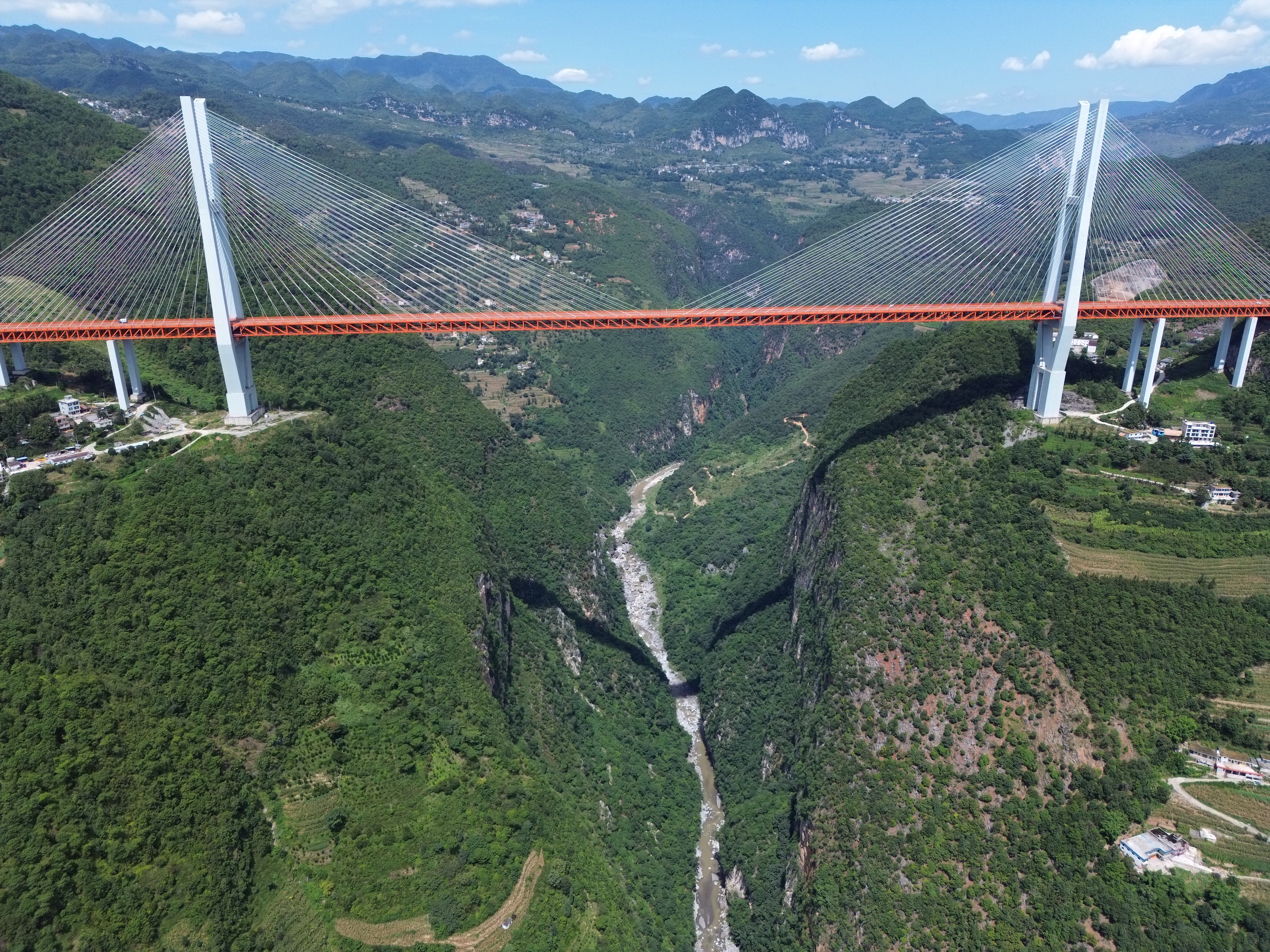

== See also ==
- List of bridges in China
- List of highest bridges
- List of tallest bridges
- List of longest cable-stayed bridge spans
