= Beipan River Guanxing Highway Bridge =

Beipan River Guanxing Highway Bridge 北盘江大桥 (Beipanjiang Daqiao)
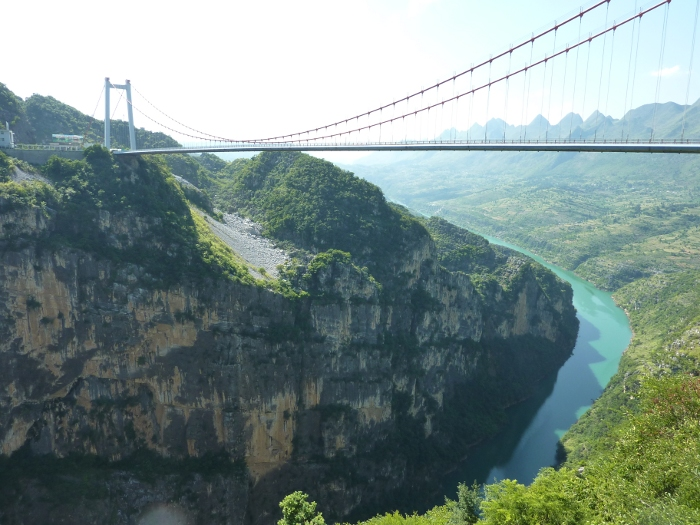
- Coordinates: 25.650850°N 105.692210°E
- Carries: Xingyi to Guiyang Highway (Guanxing Highway)
- Crosses: Beipan River
- Locale: near Huajiang town, Guizhou, China
- Other name: Beipanjiang River 2003 Bridge

Characteristics
- Design: Suspension bridge
- Material: Steel and concrete
- Total length: 388 m (1,273 ft)
- Height: 366 m (1,201 ft)
- Longest span: 388 m (1,273 ft)

History
- Designer: Major Bridge Reconnaissance Design Institute
- Construction end: 2003
- Opened: 2003

Location
- Interactive map of Beipan River Guanxing Highway Bridge

The Beipan River Guanxing Highway Bridge or Beipanjiang River 2003 Bridge is a 366-metre-high suspension bridge on the Guanxing Highway near Xingbei Town (Xinbeizhen), Zhenfeng County, Guizhou Province, China. The bridge has a span length of 388 metres. When it opened in 2003, it was the world's highest bridge, and it held that title until the opening of Papua New Guinea's Hegigio Gorge Pipeline Bridge in 2005.

== Height ==
When the bridge was completed in 2003 it was the highest in the world, sitting 366 metres above the Beipan River. The bridge became the second Chinese span in two years to take the record. The first was the Liuguanghe Bridge in 2001. In 2009 a dam was constructed downstream from the bridge, reducing the drop to the water slightly.

The Beipan River Guanxing Highway Bridge was the first suspension bridge to break the 1,000-foot (300 m) and 300-metre height thresholds (the Liuguanghe Bridge also passes these thresholds but is a beam bridge) as well as the first suspension bridge in the world to surpass the height of Colorado's Royal Gorge Bridge after a 74-year reign. The bridge is also the second of three Beipan River crossings to have been among the world's ten highest. The first was the 902-foot-high (275 m) Beipanjiang River Railway Bridge, which opened in 2001 and was the highest train bridge in the world until 2016 when China's Najiehe Railway Bridge and Qinglong Railway Bridge were opened. The Beipan River Hukun Expressway Bridge, the third bridge to cross high above the Beipanjiang, opened in 2009 on the Guiyang-to-Kunming Highway with a suspension span 1,083 feet (330 m) above the river.

== See also ==
- List of highest bridges in the world
