= Beipan River Hukun Expressway Bridge =

Beipan River Hukun Expressway Bridge 北盘江特大桥
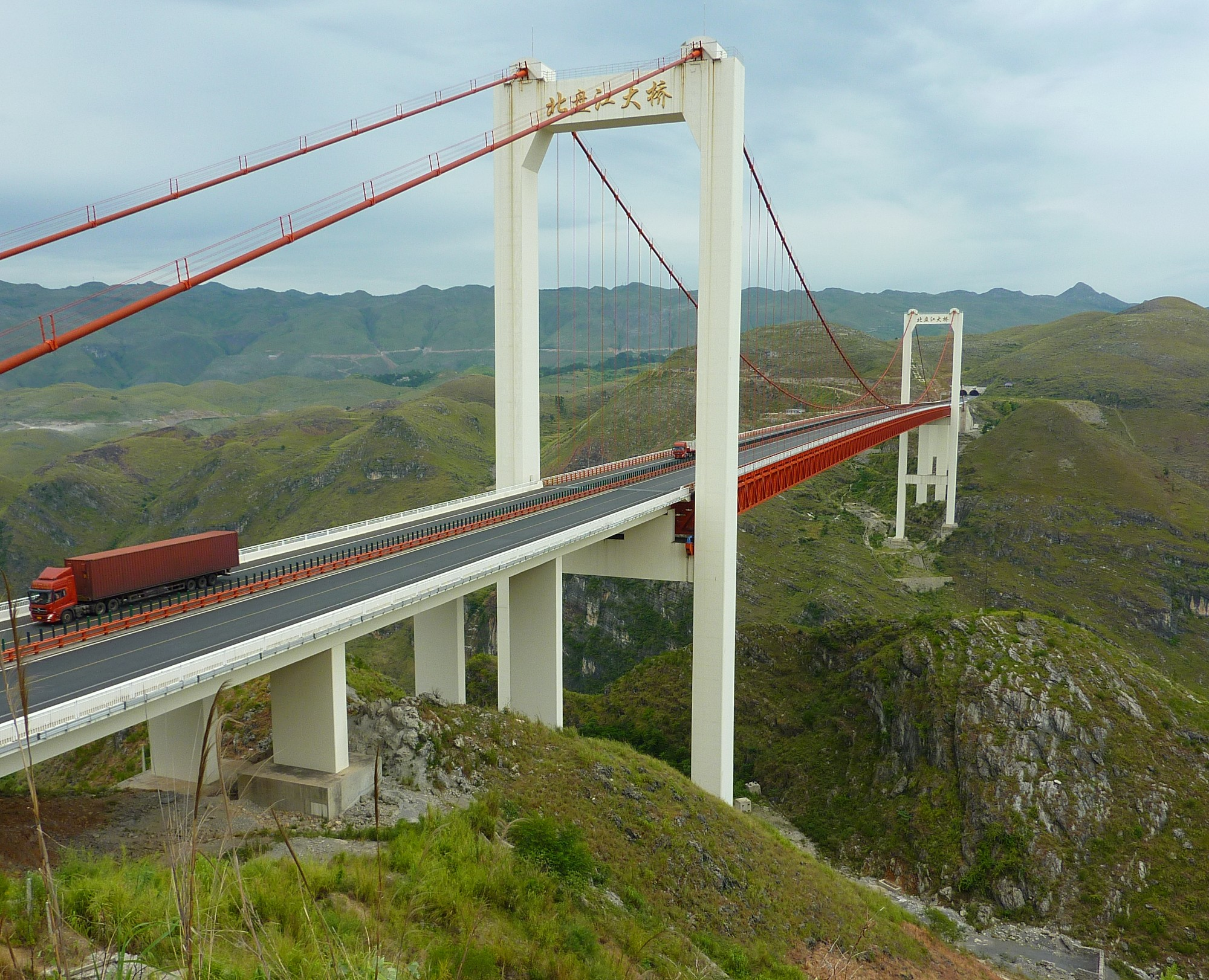
- Coordinates: 25.898°N 105.323°E
- Carries: G60 Hukun Expressway
- Crosses: Beipan River (Beipan Jiang)

Characteristics
- Design: Suspension bridge
- Material: Steel
- Height: 318 m (1,043 ft) (east tower)
- Longest span: 636 m (2,087 ft)
- Clearance below: 318 m (1,043 ft)

History
- Opened: November 27th, 2008

Location
- Interactive map of Beipan River Hukun Expressway Bridge

Beipan River Hukun Expressway Bridge is a suspension bridge near Guanling, on the border of the Anshun Prefecture, Guizhou, China. The bridge has a main span of 636 metres and is part of the G60 Shanghai–Kunming Expressway crossing the Beipan River. It stands at a height of 318 metres above the river, placing it amongst the 15 highest bridges in the world.

== See also ==
- List of highest bridges in the world
- List of longest suspension bridge spans
- Beipan River Guanxing Highway Bridge
- Beipan River Shuibai Railway Bridge
