= Zhongshan, Liupanshui =

Zhongshan 钟山区
- District
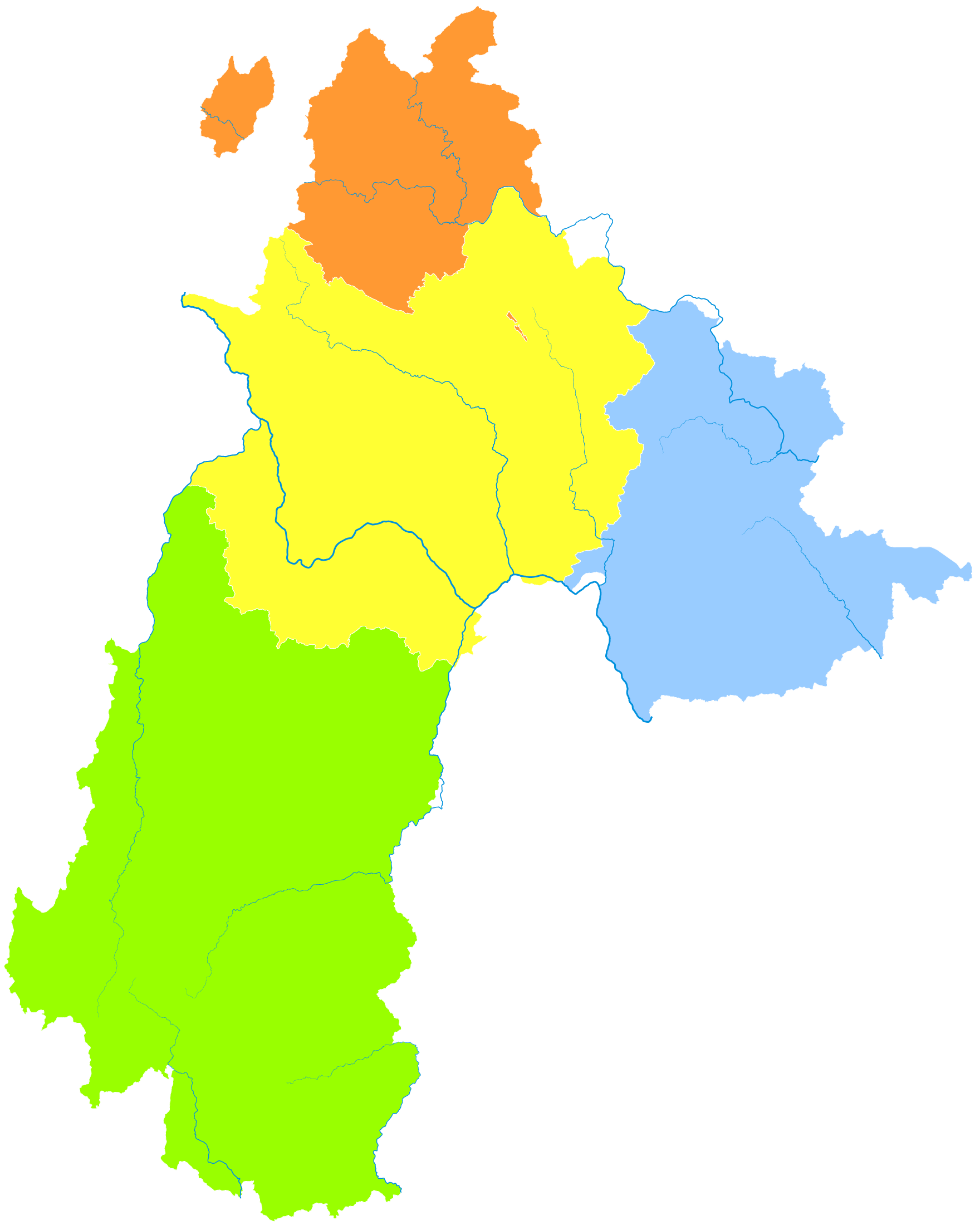
- Zhongshan is the division with multiple exclaves on this map of Liupanshui

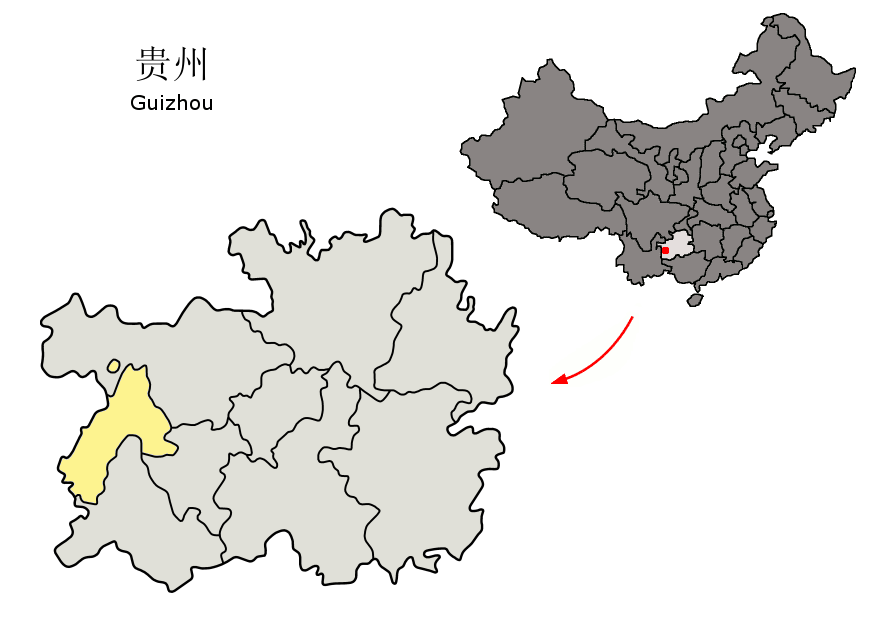
- Liupanshui in Guizhou

- Location of the seat in Guizhou Zhongshan (Southwest China)
- Coordinates (Zhongshan District government): 26°34′30″N 104°50′37″E
- Country: China
- Province: Guizhou
- Prefecture-level city: Liupanshui
- District seat: Fenghuang Subdistrict

Area
  - Total: 476 km^{2} (184 sq mi)

Population (2020 census)
  - Total: 674,249
  - Density: 1,420/km^{2} (3,670/sq mi)
- Time zone: UTC+8 (China Standard)
- Website: www.gzzs.gov.cn

Zhongshan District (simplified Chinese: 钟山区; traditional Chinese: 鐘山區; pinyin: Zhōngshān Qū) is a district of the city of Liupanshui, Guizhou province, China.

== Administrative divisions ==
Zhongshan District is divided into 9 subdistricts, 5 towns and 3 ethnic townships:

- Huangtupo Subdistrict (黄土坡街道)
- Hongyan Subdistrict (红岩街道)
- Hequan Subdistrict (荷泉街道)
- Hecheng Subdistrict (荷城街道)
- Yangliu Subdistrict (杨柳街道)
- Fenghuang Subdistrict (凤凰街道)
- Dewu Subdistrict (德坞街道)
- Yuezhao Subdistrict (月照街道)
- Shuangga Subdistrict (双戛街道)
- Dahe Town (大河镇)
- Wangjiazhai Town (汪家寨镇)
- Dawan Town (大湾镇)
- Muguo Town (木果镇)
- Baohua Town (保华镇)
- Qinglin Miao and Yi Ethnic Township (青林苗族彝族乡)
- Nankai Miao and Yi Ethnic Township (南开苗族彝族乡)
- Jinpen Miao and Yi Ethnic Township (金盆苗族彝族乡)
