= Qinglong County, Guizhou =

Qinglong County 晴隆县
- County
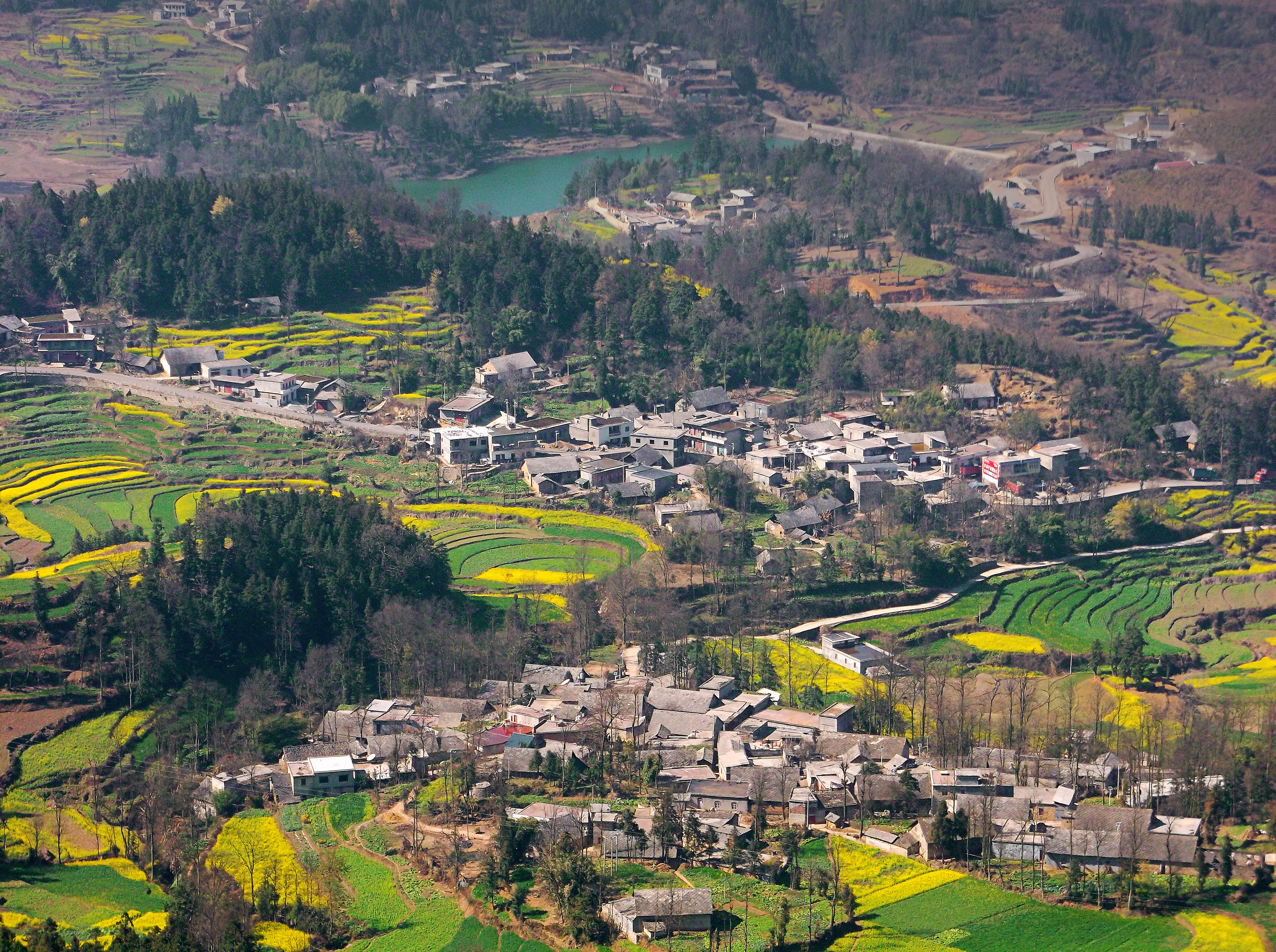

- Location of the seat in Guizhou Qinglong (Southwest China)
- Coordinates (Qinglong County government): 25°50′05″N 105°13′08″E
- Country: China
- Province: Guizhou
- Autonomous prefecture: Qianxinan
- County seat: Liancheng

Area
  - County: 1,327 km^{2} (512 sq mi)
- Highest elevation: 2,025 m (6,644 ft)
- Lowest elevation: 543 m (1,781 ft)

Population (2020)
  - County: 234,162
  - Density: 176.5/km^{2} (457.0/sq mi)
  - Urban: 76,937
  - Rural: 157,225
  - Ethnic minorities (2019): 152,300
- Time zone: UTC+8 (China Standard)
- Website: www.gzql.gov.cn

Qinglong County (simplified Chinese: 晴隆县; traditional Chinese: 晴隆縣; pinyin: Qínglóng Xiàn; lit. 'sunny and grand') is a county in the southwest of Guizhou province, China. It is under the administration of the Qianxinan Buyei and Miao Autonomous Prefecture. It has a population of 234,162 as of 2020, 56% belonging to ethnic minorities (2019 data). Qinglong is named after the Qinglong mountain; it was called Annan County (安南县) before 1941. The county was a frontline of the 1854–1873 Miao Rebellions.

== Administrative divisions ==
Qinglong County has 4 subdistricts, 8 towns, 3 townships, and 1 ethnic township under its jurisdiction:

- Liancheng Subdistrict (莲城街道)
- Dongguan Subdistrict (东观街道)
- Sanbao Subdistrict (三宝街道)
- Tenglong Subdistrict (腾龙街道)
- Shazi Town (沙子镇)
- Bihen Town (碧痕镇)
- Dachang Town (大厂镇)
- Jichang Town (鸡场镇)
- Huagong Town (花贡镇)
- Zhongying Town (中营镇)
- Guangzhao Town (光照镇)
- Chama Town (茶马镇)
- Changliu Township (长流乡)
- Zima Township (紫马乡)
- Angu Township (安谷乡)
- Sanbao Yi Ethnic Township (三宝彝族乡)

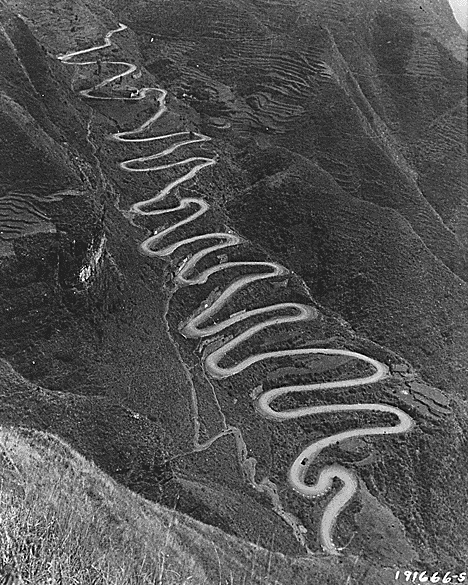
The "Twenty-Four Bends" in Qinglong County. During the Second Sino-Japanese War, Western supplies carried over the Burma Road first arrived at Kunming, the capital of Yunnan province, then traveled over mountain roads, such as the "24 Bends," passing through cities such as Guiyang, the capital of Guizhou province, before continuing to Chongqing.

== Climate ==
Climate data for Qinglong, elevation 1,553 m (5,095 ft), (1991–2020 normals, extremes 1981–2010)
Month	Jan	Feb	Mar	Apr	May	Jun	Jul	Aug	Sep	Oct	Nov	Dec	Year
Record high °C (°F)	25.2 (77.4)	27.8 (82.0)	32.2 (90.0)	33.0 (91.4)	34.6 (94.3)	32.5 (90.5)	32.0 (89.6)	31.0 (87.8)	31.0 (87.8)	28.2 (82.8)	27.3 (81.1)	24.0 (75.2)	34.6 (94.3)
Mean daily maximum °C (°F)	8.4 (47.1)	11.8 (53.2)	16.4 (61.5)	21.1 (70.0)	23.3 (73.9)	24.2 (75.6)	25.5 (77.9)	25.5 (77.9)	23.1 (73.6)	18.5 (65.3)	15.4 (59.7)	9.9 (49.8)	18.6 (65.5)
Daily mean °C (°F)	4.9 (40.8)	7.6 (45.7)	11.4 (52.5)	16.0 (60.8)	18.7 (65.7)	20.3 (68.5)	21.3 (70.3)	21.1 (70.0)	18.9 (66.0)	14.9 (58.8)	11.4 (52.5)	6.5 (43.7)	14.4 (57.9)
Mean daily minimum °C (°F)	2.8 (37.0)	4.8 (40.6)	8.2 (46.8)	12.4 (54.3)	15.3 (59.5)	17.5 (63.5)	18.4 (65.1)	18.1 (64.6)	16.1 (61.0)	12.6 (54.7)	8.8 (47.8)	4.3 (39.7)	11.6 (52.9)
Record low °C (°F)	−6.1 (21.0)	−4.5 (23.9)	−4.4 (24.1)	1.5 (34.7)	6.5 (43.7)	10.3 (50.5)	12.5 (54.5)	13.3 (55.9)	7.0 (44.6)	2.8 (37.0)	−1.5 (29.3)	−5.8 (21.6)	−6.1 (21.0)
Average precipitation mm (inches)	37.0 (1.46)	27.0 (1.06)	44.2 (1.74)	65.2 (2.57)	163.0 (6.42)	328.2 (12.92)	281.0 (11.06)	229.7 (9.04)	135.8 (5.35)	104.7 (4.12)	37.4 (1.47)	29.0 (1.14)	1,482.2 (58.35)
Average precipitation days (≥ 0.1 mm)	18.6	15.0	15.4	14.0	16.4	20.2	18.9	18.0	14.7	17.6	12.3	16.2	197.3
Average snowy days	3.9	2.3	0.4	0	0	0	0	0	0	0	0.1	1.1	7.8
Average relative humidity (%)	87	81	77	74	76	84	85	83	82	85	82	85	82
Mean monthly sunshine hours	62.2	85.9	111.7	139.5	136.3	101.7	133.5	149.3	117.9	80.7	98.6	69.9	1,287.2
Percentage possible sunshine	19	27	30	36	33	25	32	37	32	23	30	21	29
Source: China Meteorological Administration
