= Guanling Buyei and Miao Autonomous County =

Guanling County 关岭县 · Gvanylingj xianq
- Autonomous county
- 关岭布依族苗族自治县; Gvanylingj Buxqyaix Buxyeeuz Ziqziqxianq; Guanling Buyei and Miao Autonomous County
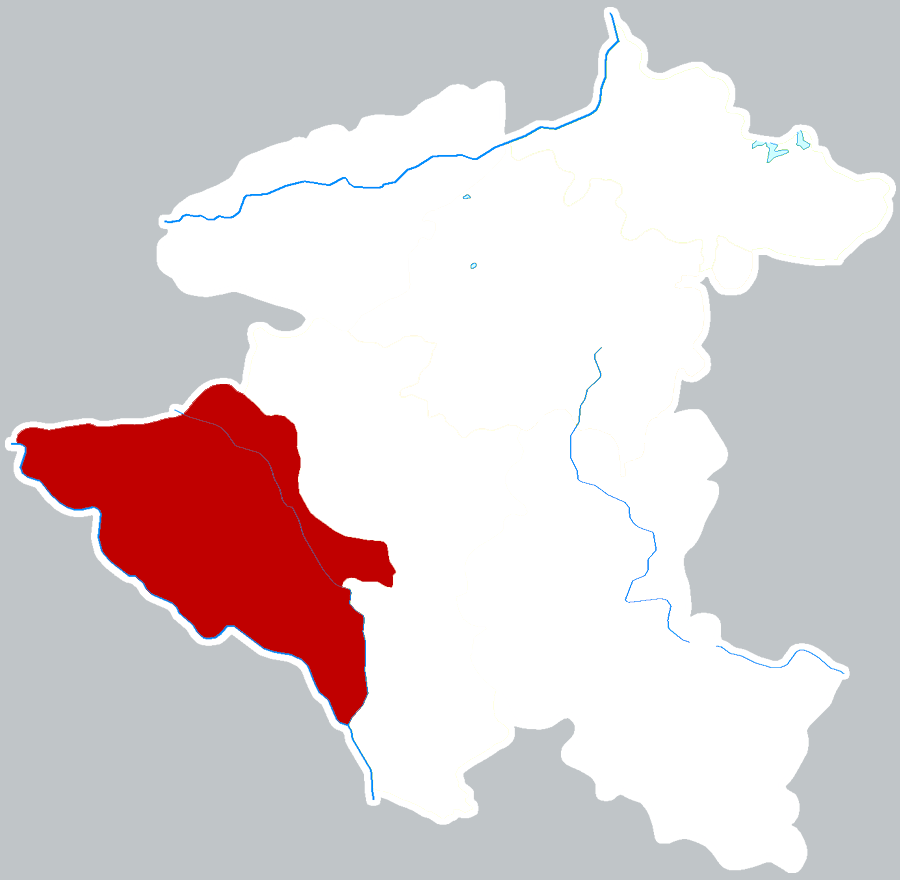
- Guanling is the westernmost division on this map of Anshun

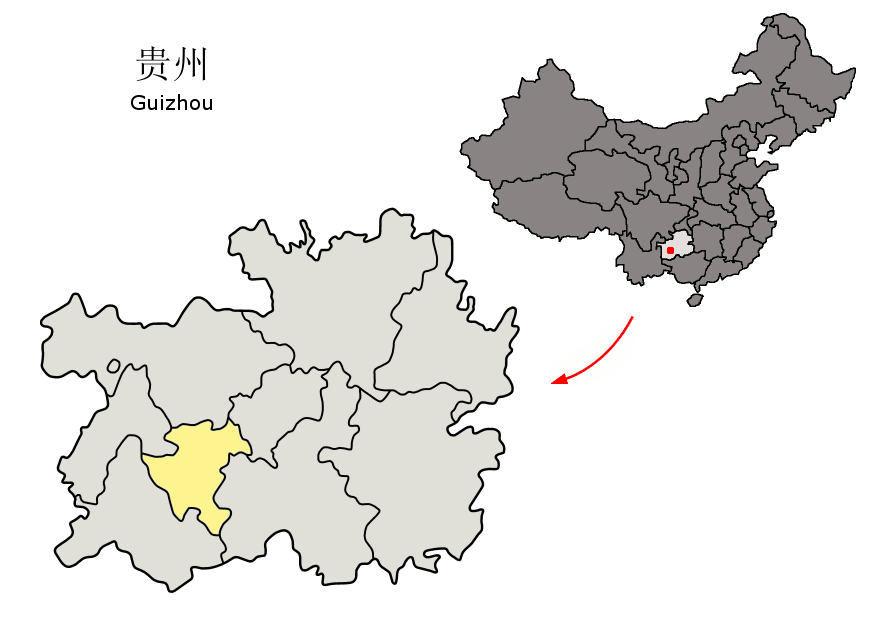
- Anshun in Guizhou

- Location within Guizhou Location within Southwest China
- Coordinates (Guanling County government): 25°57′13″N 105°32′18″E
- Country: China
- Province: Guizhou
- Prefecture-level city: Anshun
- County seat: Guansuo Subdistrict

Area
  - Total: 1,470.49 km^{2} (567.76 sq mi)

Population (2020 census)
  - Total: 283,497
  - Density: 192.791/km^{2} (499.326/sq mi)
- Time zone: UTC+8 (China Standard)
- Website: www.guanling.gov.cn

Guanling Buyei and Miao Autonomous County (simplified Chinese: 关岭布依族苗族自治县; traditional Chinese: 關嶺布依族苗族自治縣; Bouyei: Gvanylingj Buxqyaix Buxyeeuz Ziqziqxianq) is an autonomous county in Anshun City, in the southwest of Guizhou Province, China.

== Administrative divisions ==
Guanling is divided into 4 subdistricts, 9 towns and 1 township:

Subdistricts

- Dingyun Subdistrict (顶云街道)
- Guansuo Subdistrict (关索街道)
- Longtan Subdistrict (龙潭街道)
- Baihe Subdistrict (百合街道)

Towns

- Huajiang Town (花江镇)
- Yongning Town (永宁镇)
- Gangwu Town (岗乌镇)
- Shangguan Town (上关镇)
- Pogong Town (坡贡镇)
- Duanqiao Town (断桥镇)
- Baishui Town (白水镇)
- Shaying Town (沙营镇)
- Xinpu Town (新铺镇)

Townships

- Puli Township (普利乡)

== Transportation ==
- Guanxing Highway
- China National Highway 320
- G60 Shanghai–Kunming Expressway
- Guanling railway station

== Climate ==
Climate data for Guanling, elevation 1,142 m (3,747 ft), (1991–2020 normals, extremes 1981–2010)
Month	Jan	Feb	Mar	Apr	May	Jun	Jul	Aug	Sep	Oct	Nov	Dec	Year
Record high °C (°F)	26.0 (78.8)	30.7 (87.3)	35.3 (95.5)	35.3 (95.5)	35.9 (96.6)	33.5 (92.3)	33.3 (91.9)	33.6 (92.5)	33.9 (93.0)	29.8 (85.6)	26.4 (79.5)	23.5 (74.3)	35.9 (96.6)
Mean daily maximum °C (°F)	10.1 (50.2)	13.5 (56.3)	18.1 (64.6)	23.2 (73.8)	25.6 (78.1)	26.5 (79.7)	27.9 (82.2)	28.3 (82.9)	25.8 (78.4)	20.9 (69.6)	17.3 (63.1)	11.9 (53.4)	20.8 (69.4)
Daily mean °C (°F)	6.9 (44.4)	9.5 (49.1)	13.3 (55.9)	18.1 (64.6)	20.8 (69.4)	22.5 (72.5)	23.6 (74.5)	23.4 (74.1)	21.1 (70.0)	17.2 (63.0)	13.2 (55.8)	8.4 (47.1)	16.5 (61.7)
Mean daily minimum °C (°F)	4.6 (40.3)	6.6 (43.9)	9.9 (49.8)	14.3 (57.7)	17.3 (63.1)	19.6 (67.3)	20.7 (69.3)	20.1 (68.2)	17.9 (64.2)	14.6 (58.3)	10.4 (50.7)	6.0 (42.8)	13.5 (56.3)
Record low °C (°F)	−3.4 (25.9)	−1.6 (29.1)	−0.9 (30.4)	4.2 (39.6)	8.7 (47.7)	12.9 (55.2)	13.0 (55.4)	15.2 (59.4)	8.9 (48.0)	6.0 (42.8)	−0.9 (30.4)	−5.7 (21.7)	−5.7 (21.7)
Average precipitation mm (inches)	30.0 (1.18)	19.5 (0.77)	36.1 (1.42)	66.5 (2.62)	160.2 (6.31)	296.8 (11.69)	271.7 (10.70)	184.8 (7.28)	133.0 (5.24)	93.4 (3.68)	34.3 (1.35)	19.7 (0.78)	1,346 (53.02)
Average precipitation days (≥ 0.1 mm)	14.8	11.7	12.9	13.2	15.8	18.8	18.0	16.5	12.9	15.8	10.5	11.6	172.5
Average snowy days	1.9	0.7	0.2	0	0	0	0	0	0	0	0	0.4	3.2
Average relative humidity (%)	82	77	75	73	75	82	83	81	79	81	80	79	79
Mean monthly sunshine hours	44.6	67.1	99.1	135.4	140.8	110.3	154.3	175.1	135.4	82.9	93.9	61.0	1,299.9
Percentage possible sunshine	13	21	27	35	34	27	37	44	37	23	29	19	29
Source: China Meteorological Administration
