= Liupanshui =

Liupanshui 六盘水市
- Prefecture-level city
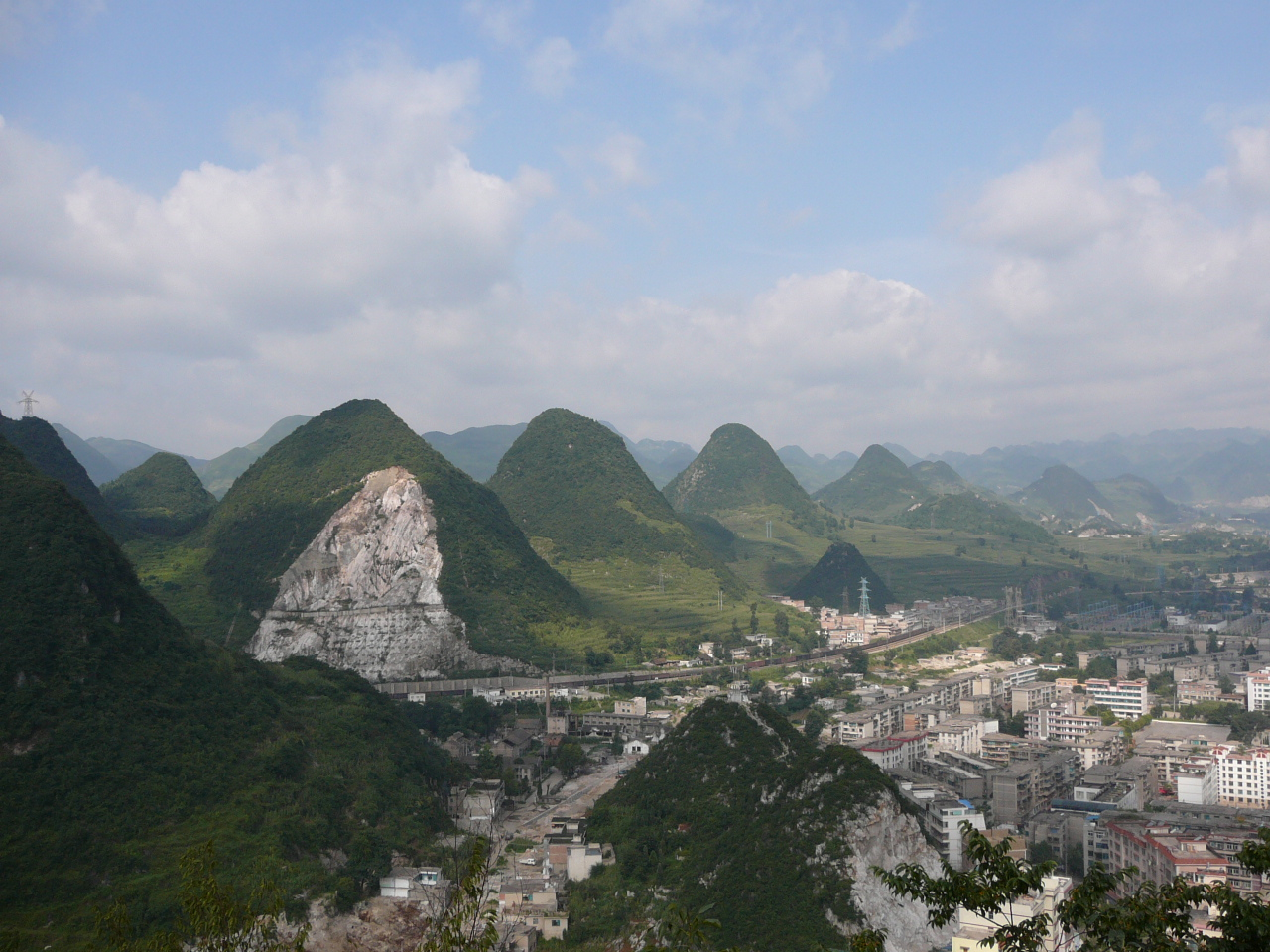

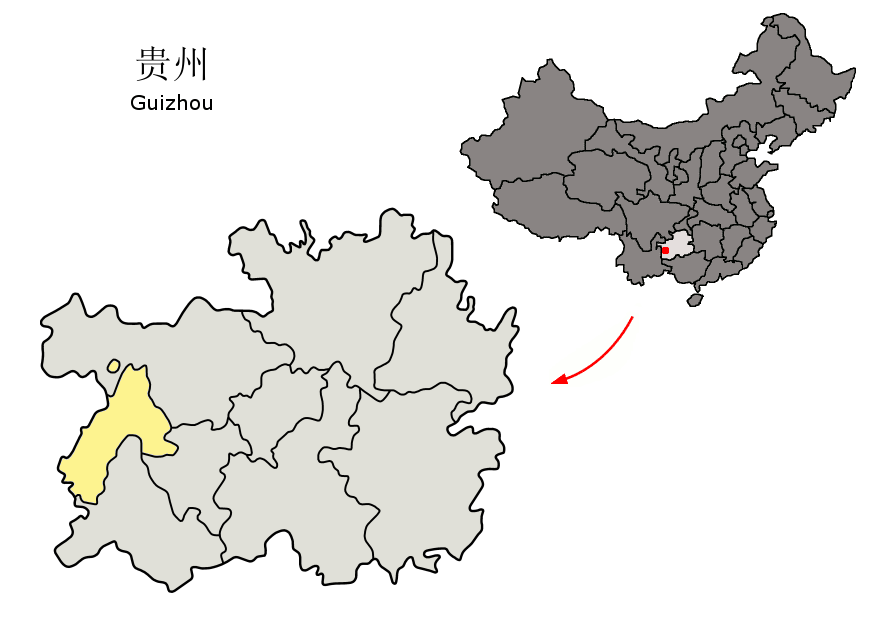
- Location of Liupanshui Prefecture within Guizhou

- Location within Guizhou Location within Southwest China
- Coordinates (Liupanshui municipal government): 26°35′33″N 104°49′49″E
- Country: People's Republic of China
- Province: Guizhou
- Municipal seat: Zhongshan District

Area
  - Prefecture-level city: 9,926 km^{2} (3,832 sq mi)

Population (2006)
  - Prefecture-level city: 2,830,000
  - Metro: 251,900

GDP
  - Prefecture-level city: CN¥ 134.0 billion US$ 19.4 billion
  - Per capita: CN¥ 44,224; US$ 6,412
- Time zone: UTC+8 (China Standard)
- Postal code: 553000
- Area code: 858
- ISO 3166 code: CN-GZ-02
- Website: www.gzlps.gov.cn

Liupanshui (simplified Chinese: 六盘水; traditional Chinese: 六盤水; pinyin: Liùpánshuǐ) is a city in western Guizhou province, People's Republic of China. The name Liupanshui combines the first character from the names of each of the city's three constituent counties: Liuzhi, Panzhou, Shuicheng. As a prefecture-level city with an area of 9,926 square kilometres (3,832 sq mi), Liupanshui had a total population of over 2,830,000 in 2006, making it the second largest in the province, though only 251,900 inhabitants were urban residents. The city is known locally as "The Cool City" or "Cool Capital" due to its low average summer temperature.

== History ==
The general area is significant as the seat of the historic Yelang political entity, a confederation of tribes that dominated parts of modern-day Guizhou, Hunan, Sichuan and Yunnan provinces. The city was established in 1978 as a prefecture-level municipality.

== Administrative divisions ==
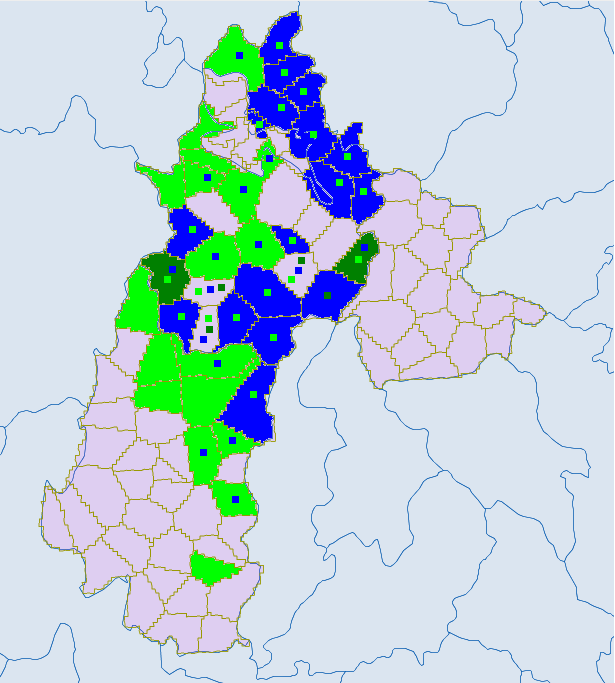
Ethnic townships in Liupanshui except Liuzhi. Light green -Yi. Blue - miao. Dark green- Bouyei

Liupanshui City is located in the western part of Guizhou Province, on the slopes of the first and second level terraces of the Yunnan-Guizhou Plateau. It spans from 25°19′44″ to 26°55′33″ north latitude and from 104°18′20″ to 105°42′50″ east longitude, with a total area of 9,914.5958 square kilometers, accounting for 5.63% of the total area of the province.

Its administratively divided to the following county-level jurisdictions:

- District
  - Zhongshan District (钟山区)
  - Shuicheng District (水城区)
- Special District
  - Liuzhi Special District (六枝特区)
- County-level city
  - Panzhou City (盘州市)

Map
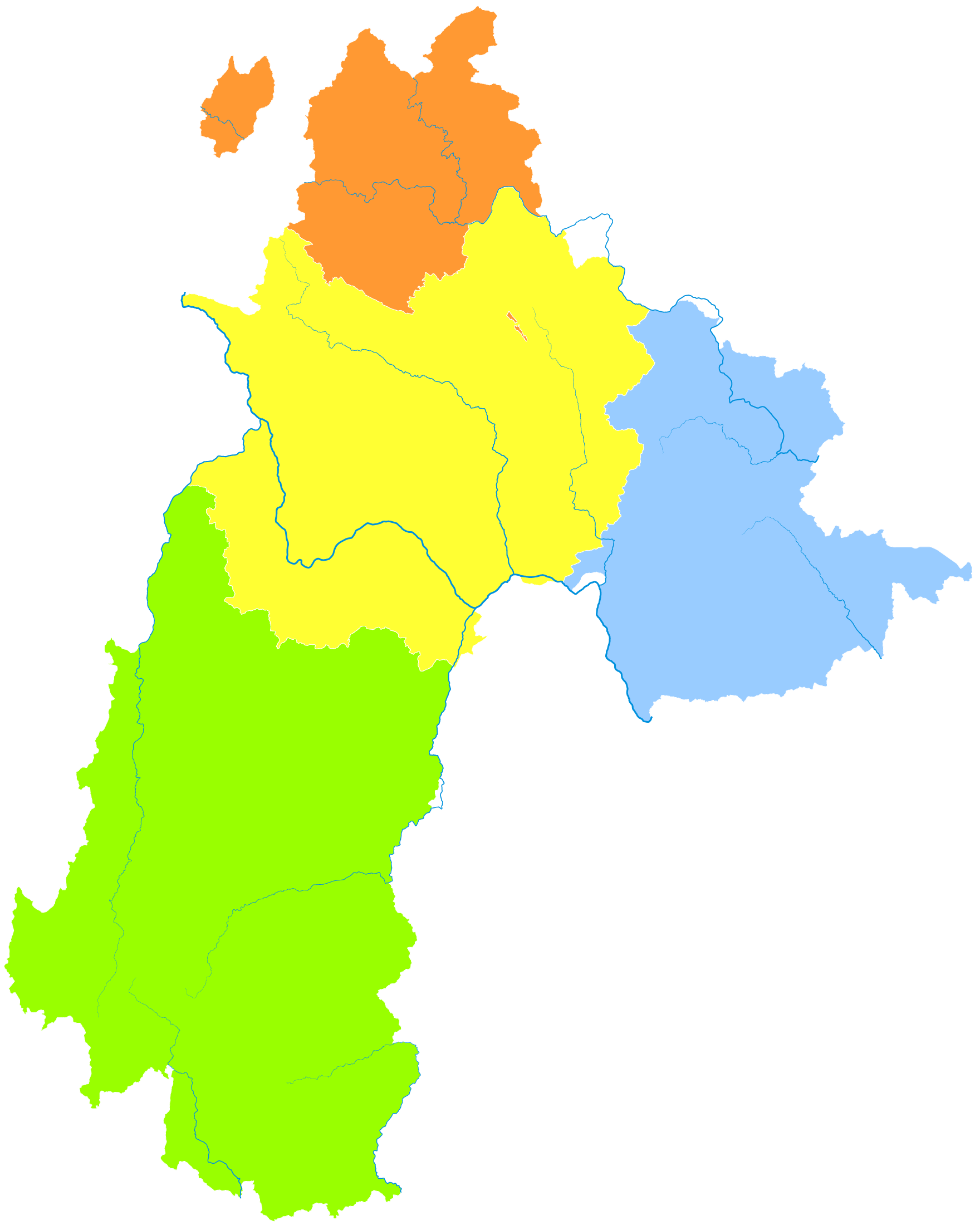

== Ethnic groups ==
Liupanshui is a multi-ethnic area with many ethnic minorities, among which the Yi, Miao, Buyi, Bai, Hui and Gelao ethnic groups are the indigenous ethnic groups in Liupanshui City.

The Liupanshui City Ethnic Gazetteer (六盘水市志：民族志) (2003:139, 154, 160) lists the following ethnic groups and their respective locations.

- Bai
  - Pan County (pop. 16,829): in Jiuying (旧营), Gaotun (高屯), Yangchangba (羊场坝), Luna (鲁那), Shahe (沙河)
  - Shuicheng County (pop. 6,711): in Longchang (龙场), Yingpan (营盘)
- Gelao
  - Liuzhi Special District (pop. 8,128): in Langdai (郎岱), Xinhua (新华), Duoque (堕却)
  - Shuicheng County (pop. 1,862): in Fa'er (发耳), Longchang (龙场), Yangmei (杨梅), Miluo (米箩), Panlong (蟠龙)
- Shui
  - Pan County (pop. 3,519): in Panguan (盘关)
  - Shuicheng County (pop. 4,211): in Fa'er

== Climate ==
Liupanshui belongs to the subtropical monsoon humid climate zone. Affected by the low latitude and high altitude, it has a pleasant climate with warm winters and cool summers. The annual average temperature is 15 °C, the average temperature in January is 3 to 6.3 °C, and the average temperature in July is 19.8 °C to 22 °C.

Climate data for Liupanshui (Shuicheng District), elevation 1,816 m (5,958 ft), (1991–2020 normals, extremes 1991–present)
Month	Jan	Feb	Mar	Apr	May	Jun	Jul	Aug	Sep	Oct	Nov	Dec	Year
Record high °C (°F)	25.0 (77.0)	27.3 (81.1)	32.2 (90.0)	32.5 (90.5)	33.7 (92.7)	32.9 (91.2)	31.6 (88.9)	30.9 (87.6)	31.3 (88.3)	27.5 (81.5)	26.0 (78.8)	23.1 (73.6)	33.7 (92.7)
Mean daily maximum °C (°F)	7.6 (45.7)	11.0 (51.8)	15.7 (60.3)	20.1 (68.2)	22.1 (71.8)	23.2 (73.8)	24.8 (76.6)	24.7 (76.5)	21.9 (71.4)	17.1 (62.8)	14.3 (57.7)	8.9 (48.0)	17.6 (63.7)
Daily mean °C (°F)	3.5 (38.3)	6.1 (43.0)	9.9 (49.8)	14.2 (57.6)	16.9 (62.4)	18.8 (65.8)	20.2 (68.4)	19.8 (67.6)	17.3 (63.1)	13.3 (55.9)	9.7 (49.5)	4.8 (40.6)	12.9 (55.2)
Mean daily minimum °C (°F)	0.9 (33.6)	2.9 (37.2)	6.2 (43.2)	10.2 (50.4)	13.2 (55.8)	15.8 (60.4)	17.1 (62.8)	16.5 (61.7)	14.3 (57.7)	10.9 (51.6)	6.7 (44.1)	2.3 (36.1)	9.8 (49.6)
Record low °C (°F)	−12.6 (9.3)	−6.5 (20.3)	−2.2 (28.0)	0.5 (32.9)	3.9 (39.0)	9.8 (49.6)	11.3 (52.3)	9.1 (48.4)	5.2 (41.4)	1.6 (34.9)	−3.8 (25.2)	−6.9 (19.6)	−12.6 (9.3)
Average precipitation mm (inches)	23.0 (0.91)	16.3 (0.64)	27.8 (1.09)	56.4 (2.22)	119.6 (4.71)	243.3 (9.58)	217.0 (8.54)	170.4 (6.71)	146.5 (5.77)	92.5 (3.64)	27.9 (1.10)	17.3 (0.68)	1,158 (45.59)
Average precipitation days (≥ 0.1 mm)	16.4	13.7	14.5	14.7	16.9	20.1	18.9	17.5	15.7	19.0	12.0	15.5	194.9
Average snowy days	8.3	5.2	1.4	0.1	0	0	0	0	0	0	0.4	3.9	19.3
Average relative humidity (%)	85	79	75	73	75	81	82	81	81	85	82	84	80
Mean monthly sunshine hours	76.5	98.3	128.8	144.1	132.5	97.2	129.4	140.7	113.6	80.0	102.3	77.1	1,320.5
Percentage possible sunshine	23	31	35	37	32	23	31	35	31	23	32	24	30
Source: China Meteorological Administration

== Transportation ==
=== Rail ===
Liupanshui is a major rail hub in southwestern China. The Shanghai-Kunming, Liupanshui-Baiguo and Neijiang-Kunming Railways intersect in the city.The Neijiang-Kunming Railway starts from Neijiang Station in Sichuan Province in the north, passes through Yibin, Zhaotong, Bijie, etc., and ends at Kunming Station in Yunnan Province. It is 872 kilometers long and is a Class I passenger and freight single-track electrified railway connecting Neijiang City, Sichuan Province and Kunming City, Yunnan Province.

=== Air ===
The city is served by Liupanshui Yuezhao Airport.Liupanshui Yuezhao Airport is a civil airport located at the junction of Damu Village, Yuezhao Township, Zhongshan District, Liupanshui City, known as the "Cool Capital of China", and Dayao Village, Dongdi Township, Shuicheng County in the western part of Guizhou Province, China. It is 10.5 kilometers away from the city center in a straight line and about 15 kilometers away by ordinary road.

== Tourism ==
Tourism in Liupanshui focuses on minority folk culture and karst landform tourism. This includes the underground lake in Qilin Cave Park (麒麟公园), Danxia Mountain (丹霞山), about which Xu Xiake, the Chinese travel writer and geographer of the Ming Dynasty, had written. Yushe National Park (玉舍国家公园) includes the Jiucai Ping Scenic Zone (韭菜坪景区). The flat-topped Jiucai Ping is the tallest mountain in Guizhou Province at about 2900 meters. Jiucai here means "garlic chives", so named because the mountain is famous for its garlic chive blossoms. Other attractions include the sunrise, the sea of clouds, and unusual rock formations. Also notable is the Tiansheng Bridge (天生桥), "tiansheng" meaning "god-made". There is also a nature reserve called Shuicheng Francois's Leaf Monkey Nature Reserve (水城野钟黑叶猴自然保护区).

Liupanshui has also developed tourism based on its role in the Third Front construction. Liupanshui is the site of the Guizhou Third Front Construction Museum.

== Cuisine ==
Local cuisine includes Yangrou fen (羊肉粉) - Lamb rice noodles, and Luoguo yangyu (烙锅洋芋) - Fried potatoes. Lotus leaf glutinous rice chicken is a traditional snack in Liupanshui City, which has a long-standing reputation and is also a famous dish in banquets.

Shuicheng Laoguo (Shuicheng Hot Pot): Shuicheng Laoguo was listed as a representative project of the fifth batch of municipal intangible cultural heritage by the Liupanshui Municipal People's Government in 2018.

Panxian ham: Panxian ham takes a year to fully develop its characteristic flavor. The longer it's aged, the more mellow and fragrant it becomes. Ham aged three years or more can even be eaten raw.

Gua Lu Rice: The ingredients for Gua Lu Rice are combined in an unpredictable way, and the flavor can be either refreshing and subtle or strong and outgoing. Even the appearance can vary.

== International relations ==
=== Twin towns — Sister cities ===
Liupanshui is twinned with:

- Tucson, Arizona, United States

== Demographics ==
According to the Seventh National Census in 2020, the city's Permanent Population (hukou) was 3,031,602. Compared with 2,851,180 people in the Sixth census in 2010, the city's permanent population increased by 180,422 people, an increase of 6.33%, and the average annual growth rate was 0.62%. The male population was 1556454, accounting for 51.34%; The female population was 1,475,148 (48.66%). The sex ratio of the total population (100 females, male to female ratio) was 105.51, 5.19 percentage points lower than the 110.70 of the Sixth National census in 2010.

== See also ==
- History of Yunnan
