= List of bridges in Guizhou =

This is a list of bridges in Guizhou, China.

== Bridges ==
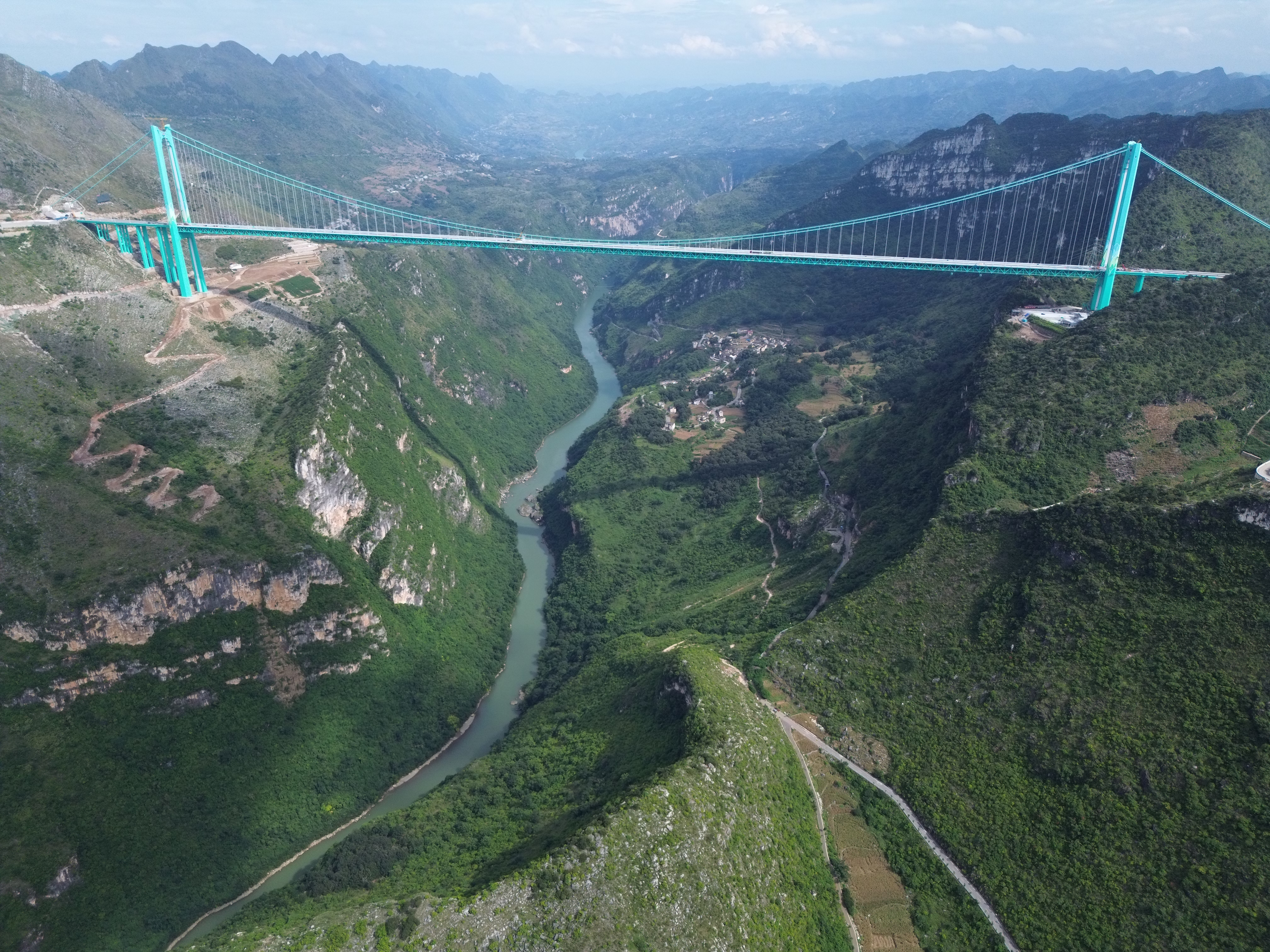
The Huajiang Canyon Bridge the world's highest bridge

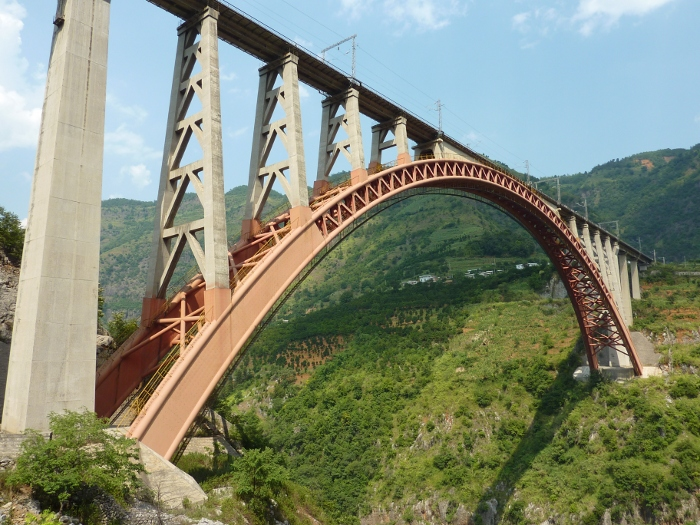
The Beipan River Shuibai Railway Bridge one of the world's highest railway bridge

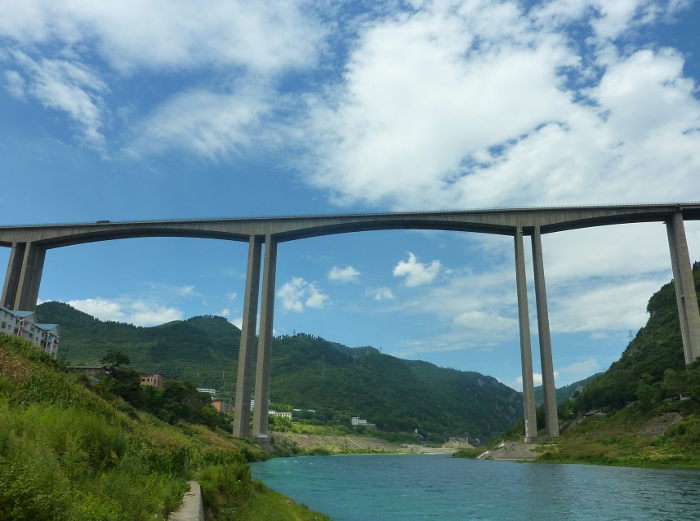
The Wujiang Viaduct

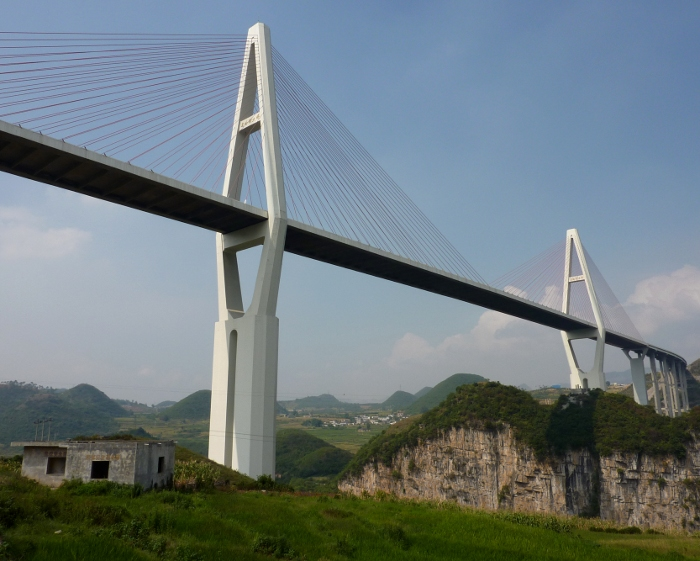
The Maling River Shankun Expressway Bridge in Xingyi

- Azhihe River Bridge
- Baling River Bridge
- Beipan River Guanxing Highway Bridge
- Beipan River Hukun Expressway Bridge
- Beipan River Shuibai Railway Bridge
- Bing'an
- Chajiaotan Bridge
- Dimuhe River Bridge
- Duge Bridge
- Fenglin Bridge under construction
- Heshandu
- Huajiang Canyon Bridge
- Hutiaohe Bridge
- Jiangjiehe Bridge
- Kaizhouhu
- Liuchong River Bridge
- Liuguanghe Bridge
- Luojiaohe Bridge
- Maling River Shankun Expressway Bridge
- Najiehe Railway Bridge
- Pingtang Bridge
- Puji Bridge
- Qinglong Railway Bridge
- Qingshui River Bridge
- Wujiang Viaduct
- Xixi Bridge
- Yachi Railway Bridge
- Yachi River Bridge
- Zangkejiang
- Zhaozhuang Bridge Pllaned to open 2027
- Zhuchanghe River Bridge
- Zongxihe Bridge
- Zunyi Bridge

== See also ==
- List of bridges in China
