= Anle =

Anle (simplified Chinese: 安乐; traditional Chinese: 安樂) may refer to:

- Anle District, a district of Keelung, Taiwan
- Anle (618–619), era name used by Li Gui, self-proclaimed emperor of Liang during the Sui–Tang transition
- Princess Anle (684–710), Emperor Zhongzong of Tang's daughter

== Places in People's Republic of China ==
=== Towns ===
- Anle, Fujian, in Ninghua County, Fujian
- Anle Town, Luoyang, in Luoyang, Henan
- Anle, Shandong, in Yanggu County, Shandong

=== Townships ===
- Anle Yi and Gelao Ethnic Township, in Dafang County, Guizhou
- Anle Township, Hanyuan County, in Hanyuan County, Sichuan
- Anle Township, Chengdu, in Jianyang, Sichuan
- Anle Township, Jiuzhaigou County, in Jiuzhaigou County, Sichuan
- Anle Township, Yunnan, in Mouding County, Yunnan

=== Subdistricts ===
- Anle Subdistrict, Harbin, in Xiangfang District, Harbin, Heilongjiang
- Anle Subdistrict, Luoyang, in Lulong District, Luoyang, Henan

== See also ==
- North American Academy of the Spanish Language, also known as Academia Norteamericana de la Lengua Española (ANLE)
