= Luojiao River Bridge =

Bridge crossing Luojiao River in Guizhou, China

Luojiao River Bridge 落脚河大桥
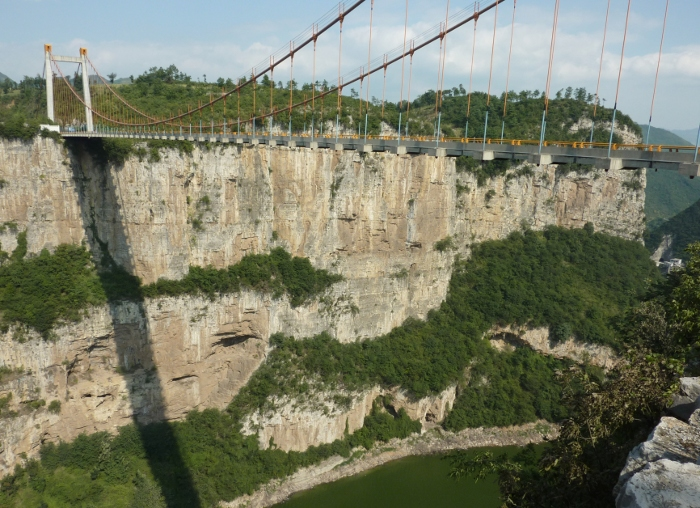
- Coordinates: 27.207944°N 105.531222°E
- Carries: China National Highway 321
- Crosses: Luojiao River a tributary of Liuchong River
- Locale: Dafang County, Guizhou, China

Characteristics
- Design: Suspension Bridge
- Material: Steel
- Total length: 268 metres (879 ft)
- Height: 183 metres (600 ft)
- Longest span: 268 metres (879 ft)

History
- Designer: Major Bridge Reconnaissance Design Institute
- Opened: 2001

Location
- Interactive map of Luojiao River Bridge

The Luojiao River Bridge is a 268 metres (879 ft) long suspension bridge in the Dafang County of Guizhou, China. The bridge forms part of China National Highway 321 between Bijie and Guiyang. As of 2012, it is among the highest bridges in the world sitting 183 metres (600 ft) above the natural river level. Three other high bridges sit along the stretch of highway between Bijie and Guiyang: the Liuguanghe Bridge, the Xixi Bridge, and the Wuxi Bridge. Construction of a dam on the river, downstream of the bridge has created a reservoir which extends under the bridge. At full pool level the clearance below the bridge is reduced to 146 metres (479 ft).

== See also ==
- List of highest bridges in the world
