= Xixi Bridge =

Xixi Bridge 西溪大桥
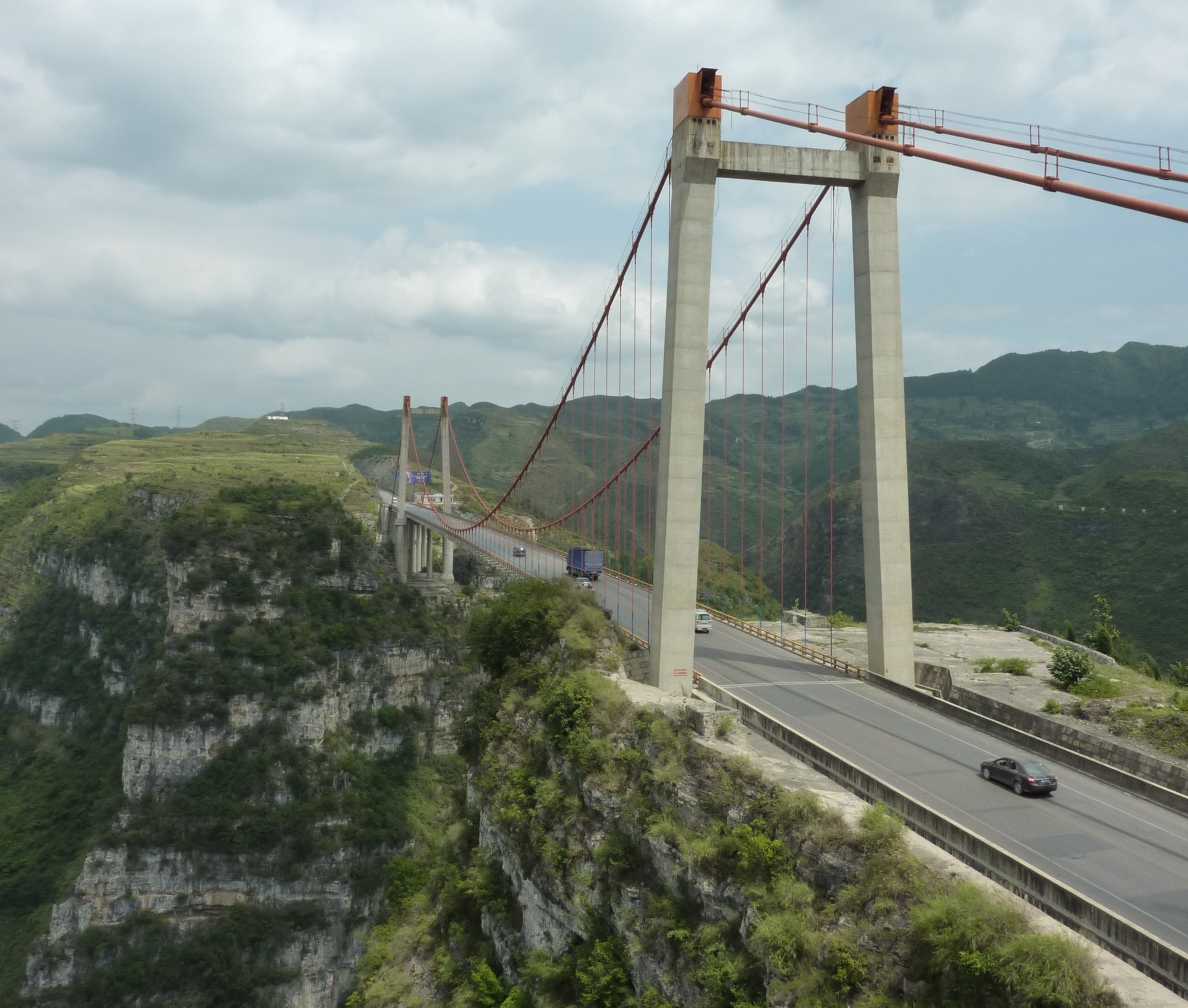
- Coordinates: 27.0308°N 105.8072°E
- Carries: China National Highway 321
- Crosses: Tributary of Liuchong River
- Locale: Dafang County and Qianxi County, Guizhou, China

Characteristics
- Design: Suspension Bridge
- Material: Steel
- Total length: 701 metres (2,300 ft)
- Height: 218 metres (715 ft)
- Longest span: 338 metres (1,109 ft)

History
- Designer: Major Bridge Reconnaissance Design Institute
- Opened: 2001

Location
- Location in China

Xixi Bridge is a 701 metres (2,300 ft) long suspension bridge on the border of Dafang County and Qianxi County in Guizhou, China. The bridge forms part of China National Highway 321 between Bijie and Guiyang. As of 2019, it is among the seventy highest bridges in the world sitting 218 metres (715 ft) above the natural river level. The reservoir from the Hongjiadu Dam on the Liuchong River extends below the bridge and when full, it reduces the clearance below the bridge to 165 metres (541 ft).

== See also ==
- List of highest bridges in the world
- List of longest suspension bridge spans
