= Baling River Bridge =

Suspension bridge in China

Baling River Bridge 坝陵河大桥
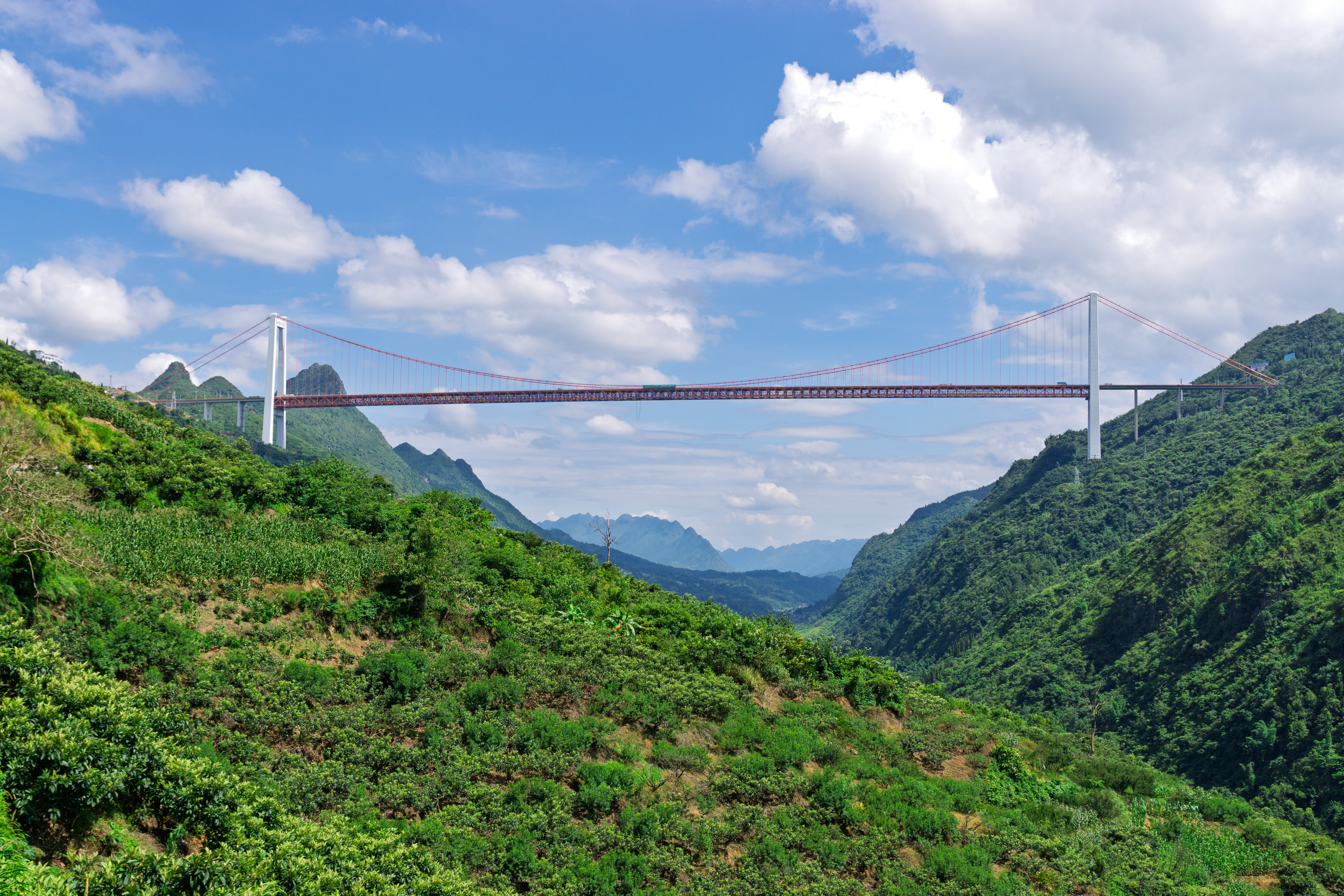
- Coordinates: 25.961111°N 105.629444°E
- Carries: G60 Shanghai–Kunming Expressway
- Locale: Guanling County, Guizhou, China
- Other name: Ba Lin He Bridge

Characteristics
- Design: Suspension
- Material: Steel
- Total length: 2,237 m (7,339 ft)
- Width: 24.5 m (80 ft)
- Height: 204.5 m (671 ft) (west tower); 189 m (620 ft) (east tower)
- Longest span: 1,088 m (3,570 ft)
- Clearance below: 370 m (1,210 ft)

History
- Opened: December 23, 2009

Location
- Interactive map of Baling River Bridge

The Baling River Bridge (Balinghe Bridge) (坝陵河大桥) is a suspension bridge in Guanling County in Guizhou Province of China. The bridge spans the Baling River Valley and opened to public traffic on December 23, 2009. The bridge is part of the G60 Shanghai–Kunming Expressway between Kunming and Guiyang and reduced the travel time across the river valley from one hour to four minutes. The suspension span is 1,088 m (3,570 ft) long, and the bridge has a total length of 2,237 m (7,339 ft). It is also one of the world's highest bridges with 370 m (1,210 ft) of clearance above the river.

== Gallery ==
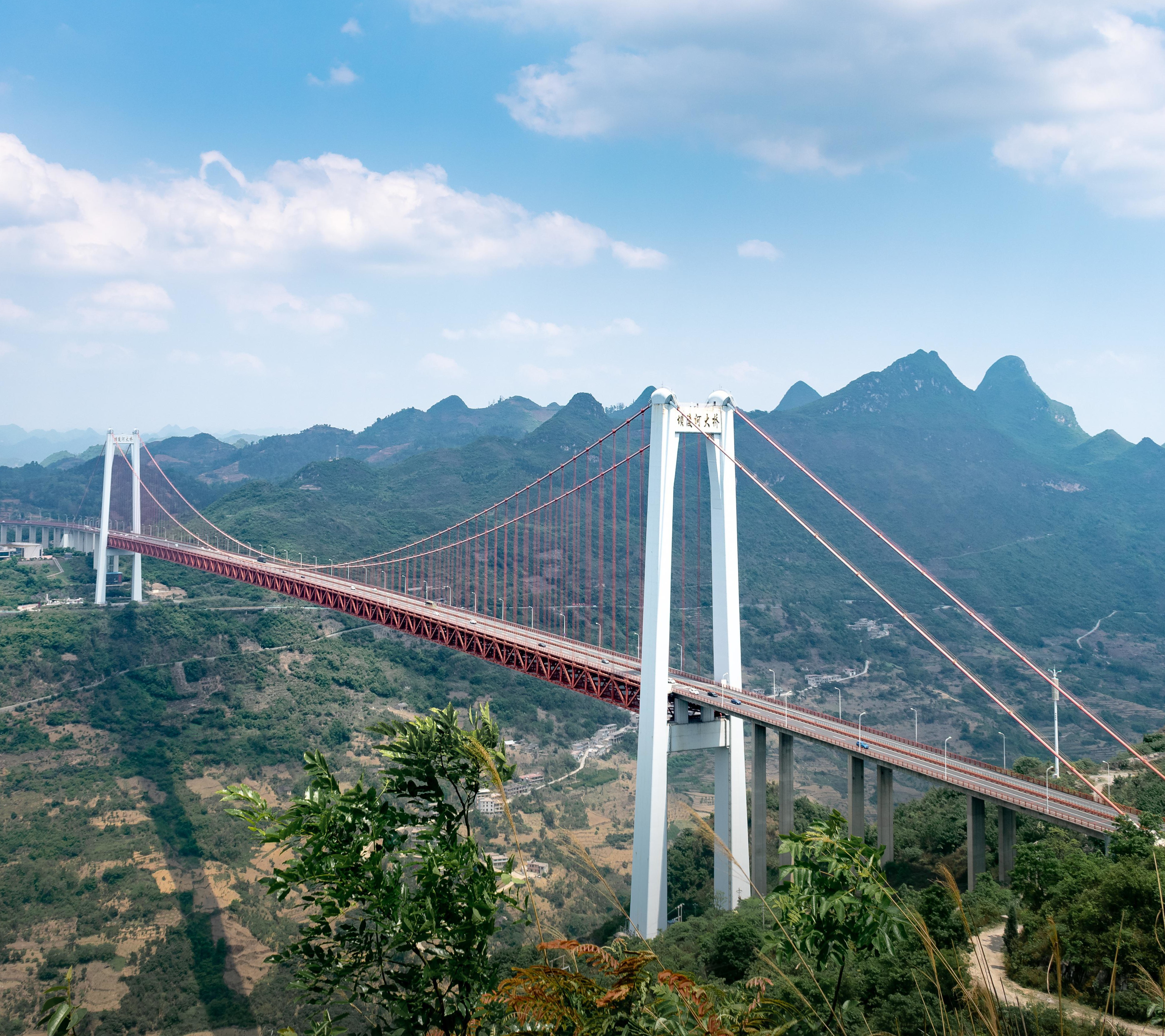

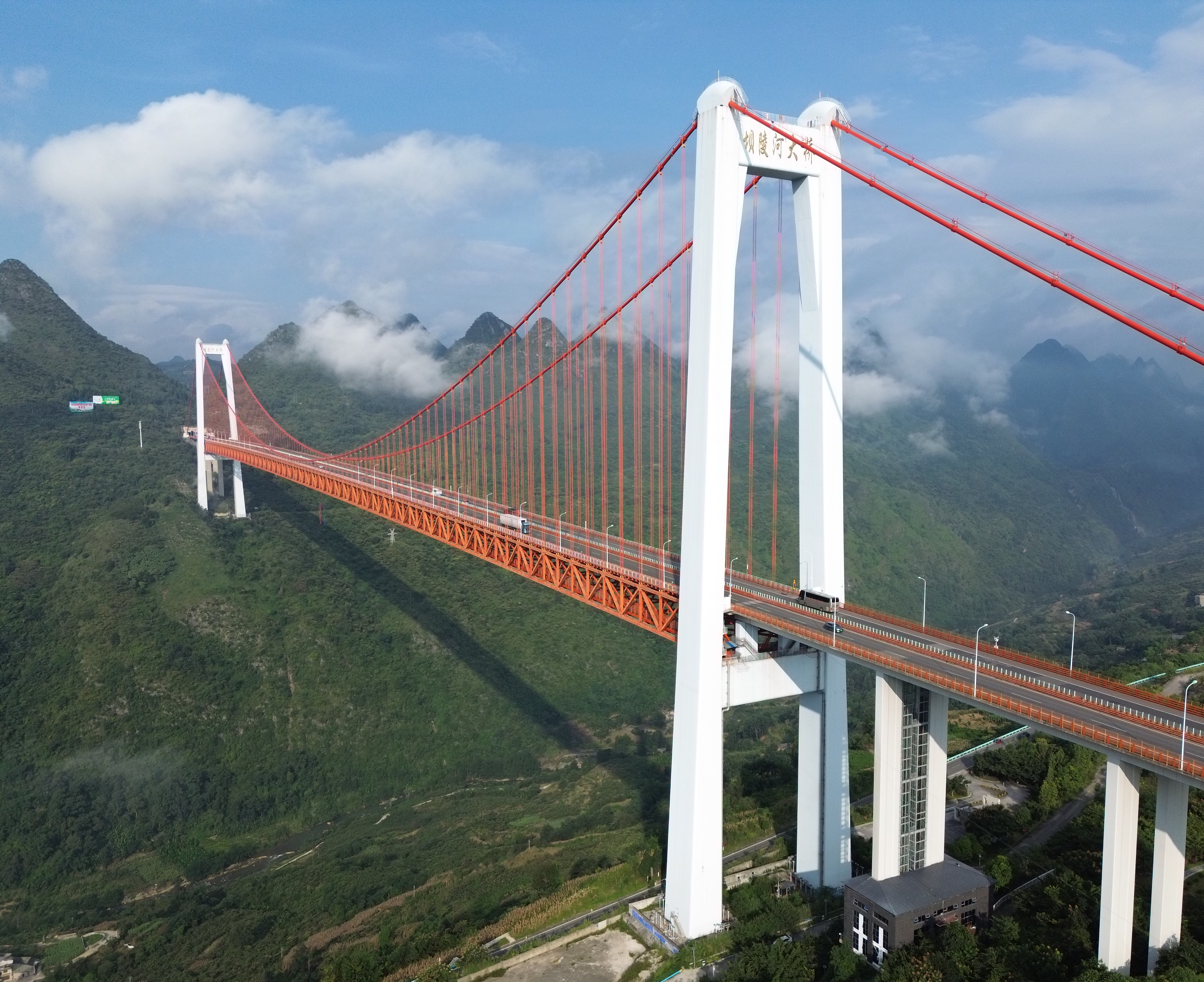
Showing the suspension

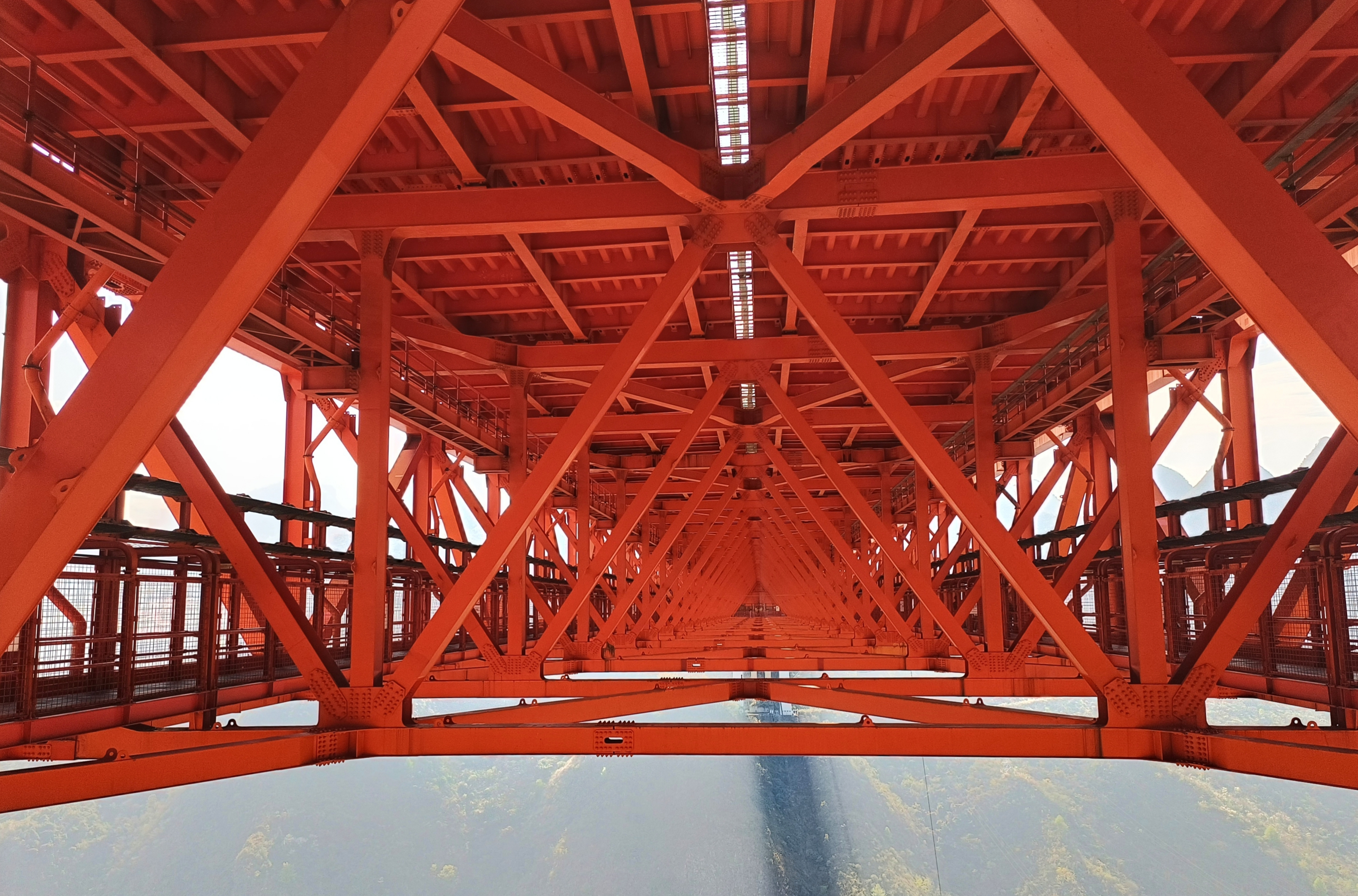

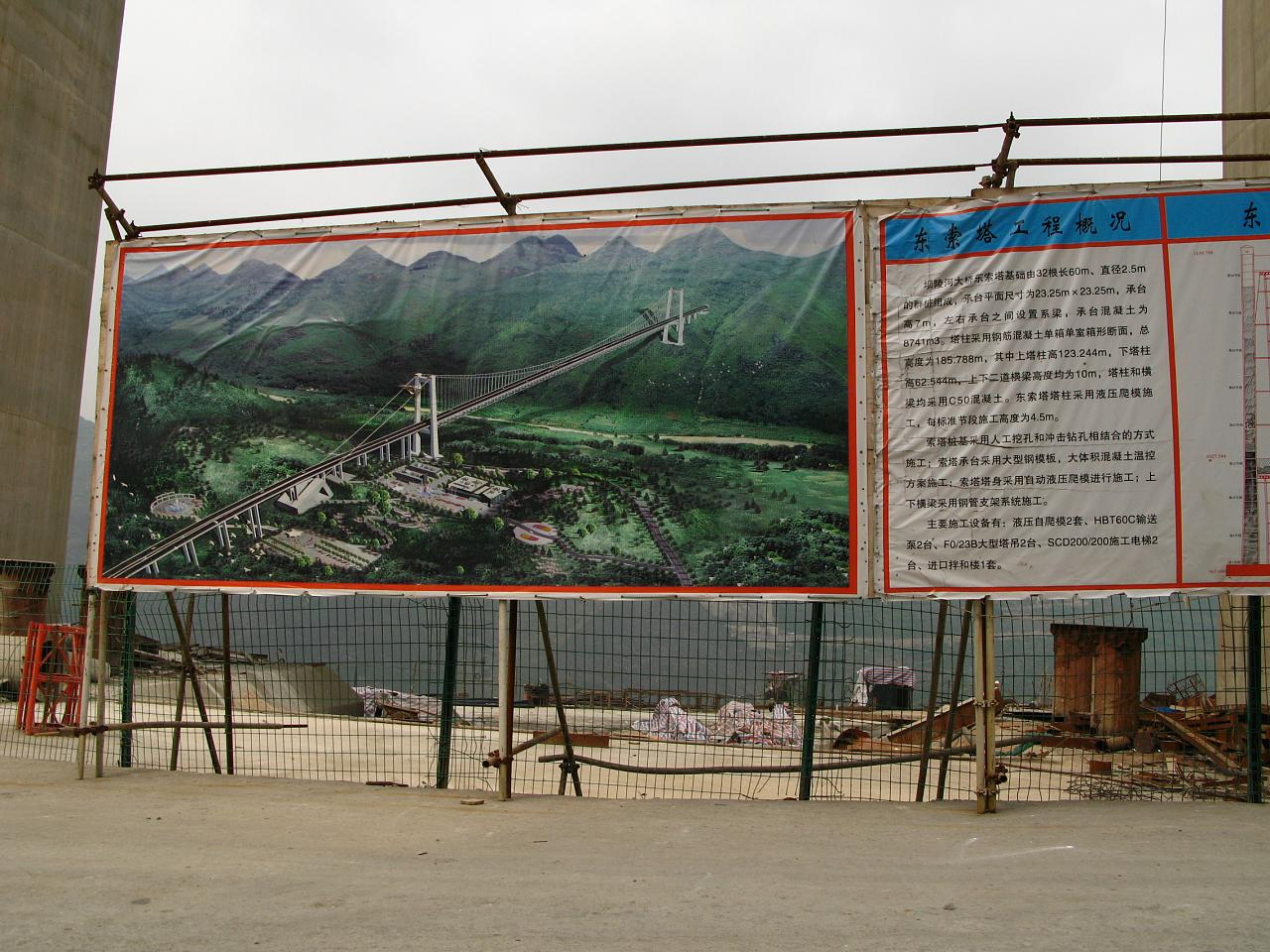
Construction plans

Baling River Bridge dimensions

== See also ==
- Bailang River Bridge Ferris Wheel, a giant wheel on a similarly-named bridge in Weifang, Shandong, China
- List of bridges in China
- List of longest suspension bridge spans
- List of highest bridges in the world
