= Luolong, Luoyang =

Luolong 洛龙区 Luoyang Suburb
- District
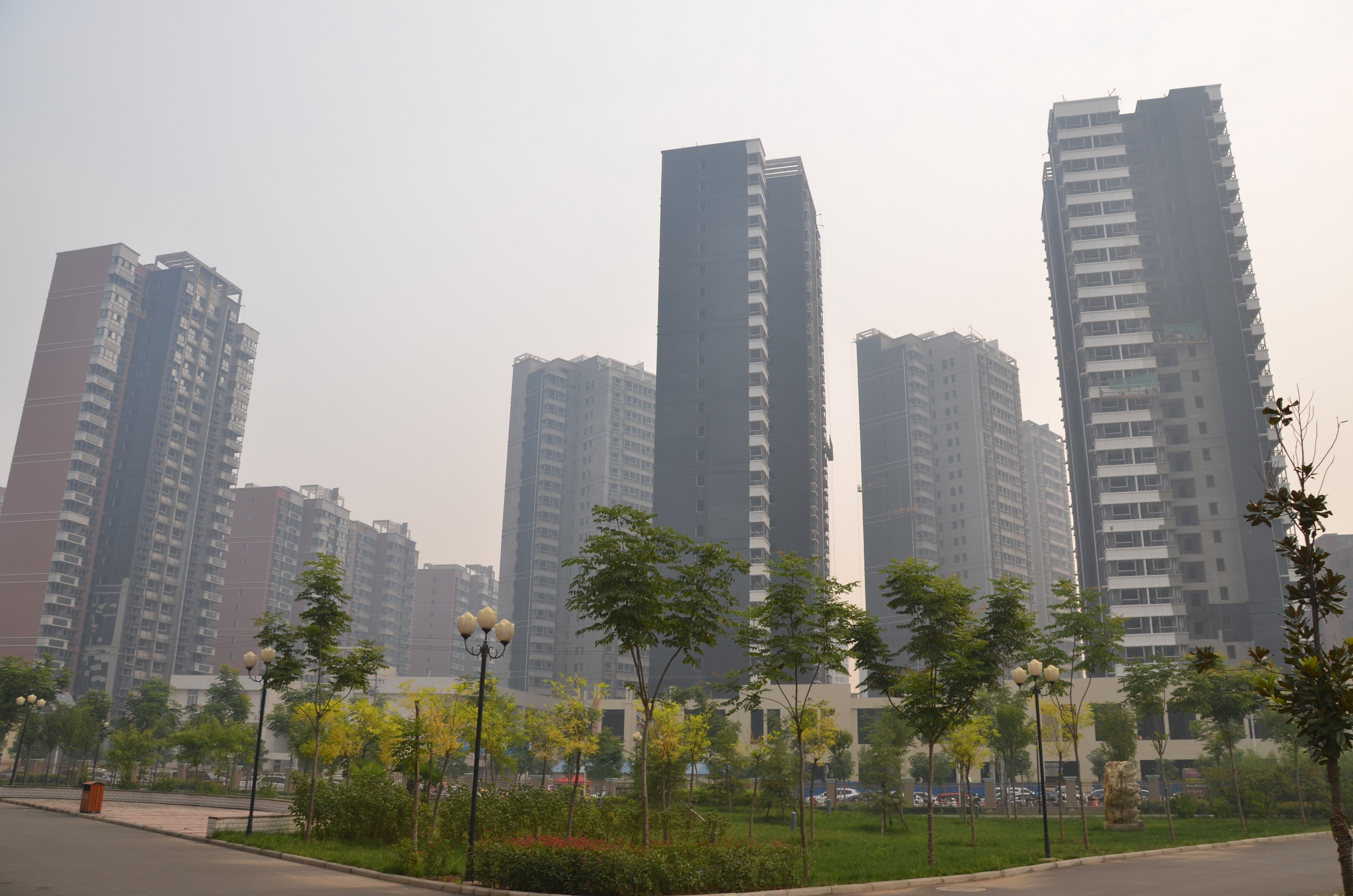

- Location in Henan
- Coordinates: 34°37′07″N 112°27′51″E
- Country: People's Republic of China
- Province: Henan
- Prefecture-level city: Luoyang

Area
  - Total: 271 km^{2} (105 sq mi)

Population (2023)
  - Total: 719,600
  - Density: 2,660/km^{2} (6,880/sq mi)
- Time zone: UTC+8 (China Standard)
- Postal code: 471000

Luolong District (simplified Chinese: 洛龙区; traditional Chinese: 洛龍區; pinyin: Luòlóng Qū) is a district and the municipal seat of the city of Luoyang, Henan province, China.

Luolong District is located in the southeast of Luoyang city, backing the Mang Mount, facing the Yi River. The Luolong District was 271 km^{2} (105 sq mi), registered population: 565,000, resident population: 724,000, in 2023.

Luolong district contains certain scenic spot including Longmen Grottoes, Guanlin Temple. At the same time, it also preserved certain intangible culture heritage including Cao Tun ceremonial drum("曹屯排鼓"), and Beliefs and customs for Guanyu ("关公信俗").

== Administrative divisions ==
As of 2012, this district is divided to 3 subdistricts, 8 towns and 1 township.

Subdistricts

- Anle Subdistrict (安乐街道)
- Kaiyuan Road Subdistrict (开元路街道)
- Longmen Grottoes Subdistrict (龙门石窟街道)

Towns

- Longmen (龙门镇)
- Baimasi (白马寺镇)
- Guanlin (关林镇)
- Anle Town (安乐镇)
- Xindian (辛店镇)
- Licun (李村镇)
- Zhuge (诸葛镇)
- Lilou (李楼镇)

Townships

- Gucheng Township (古城乡)

== Scenic Spot ==
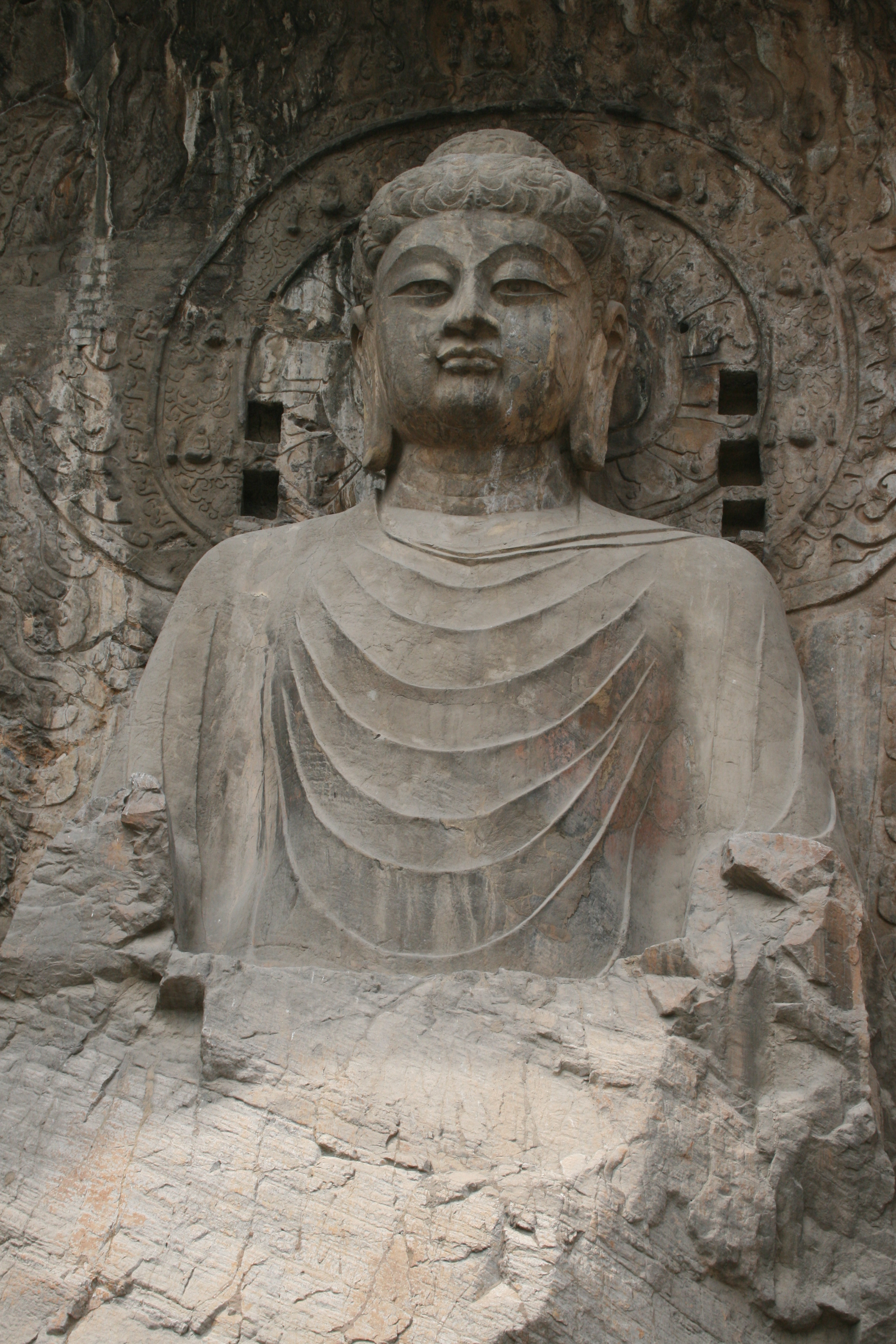
Longmen Grottoes

Longmen Grottoes：The Longmen Grottoes are example of Chinese Buddhist art. The grottoes were carved a few years before 493 AD in Northern Wei Dynasty. It continued to be expanded till the late Qing Dynasty, over 1,400 years. Nowadays, it is located in Longmen Avenue, Luolong District.

Guanlin Tample：The Guanlin Temple in Luoyang is located at 2 Guanlin South Street. It is the burial place of the head of Guan Yu (his body is buried in Dangyang, Hubei). Guanlin Temple was originally built during the Ming dynasty Wanli Emperor period and later expanded during the Qing dynasty Qianlong Emperor period. The existing buildings are mainly from the Ming Dynasty.

Sui and Tang Luoyang City Ruins：The Sui and Tang Dynasty Luoyang City Ruins are large-scale ancient city ruins from the Sui Tang Dynasties in China. It lies along the banks of the Luo River in Luoyang. It was built in the Sui Dynasty's Daye era (605 AD). It served as the eastern starting point of the Silk Road and the central hub of the Grand Canal during the Sui and Tang Dynasties.

== Cityscape ==
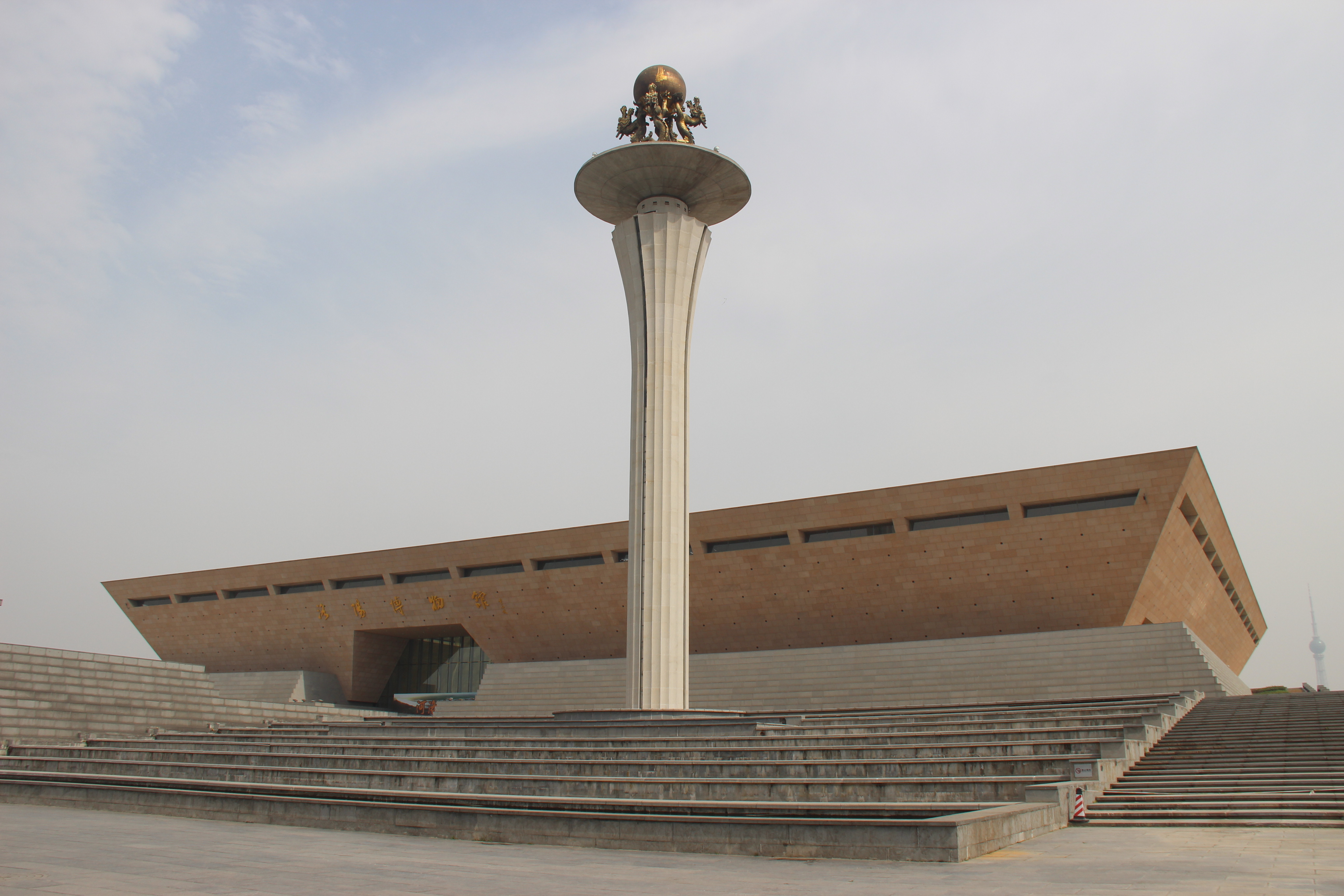
Luoyang Museum

Luolong District has certain cultural and tourism resources, including three main attractions Longmen Grottoes of UNESCO World Heritage List, the Sui and Tang Luoyang City Ruins, and Guanlin Tample. It also features 25 museums including the Luoyang Museum, the Dingdingmen Relic Museum, and the Peony Museum.It has transportation connections with multiple expressway entrances, including Guanlin Station, Longmen Station, Luolong Station, and Ganquanhe Station. It houses Luoyang's only high-speed railway hub, the Luoyang Longmen Station, and the Line 2 subway traverses the entire region.

== Cultural Heritage ==
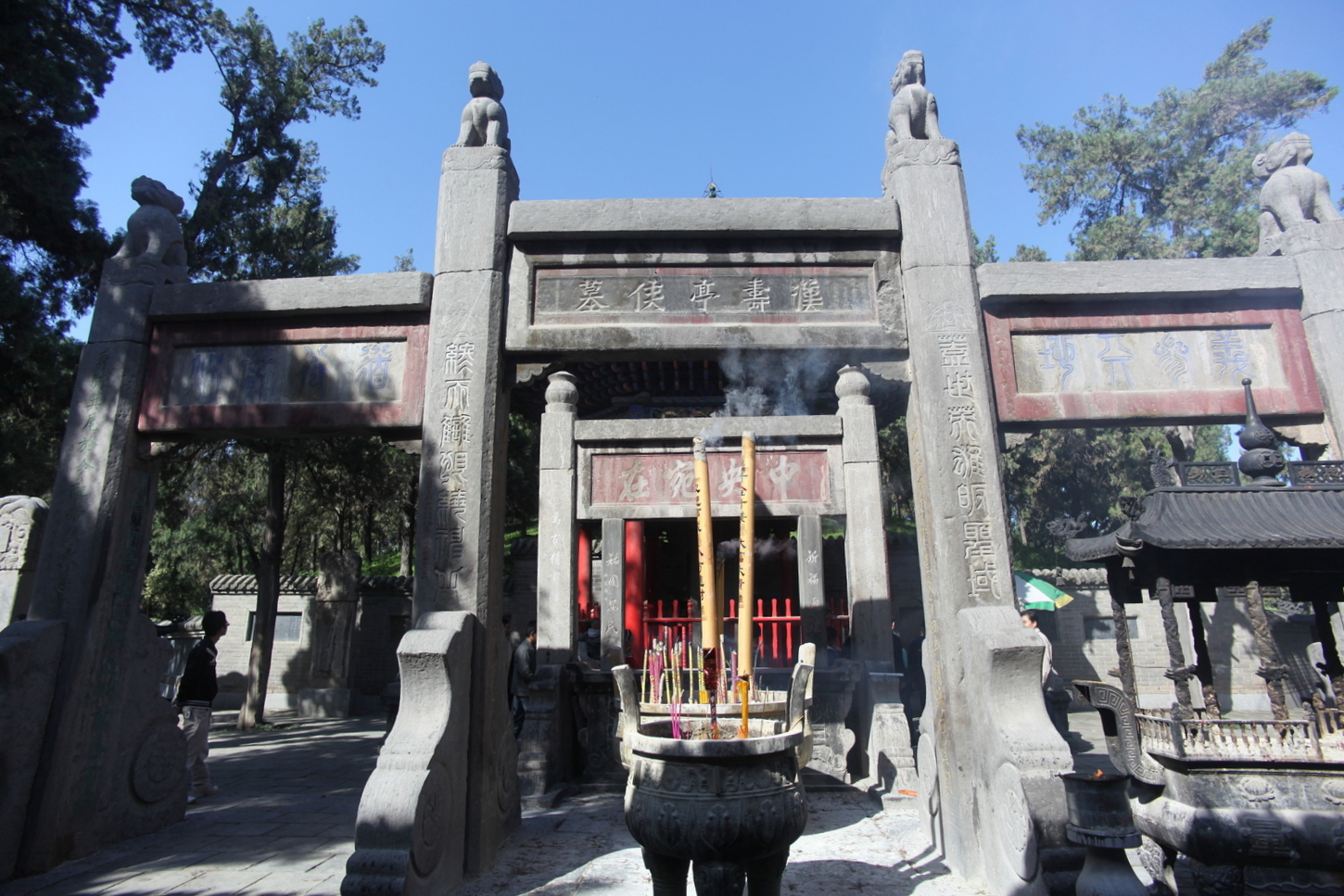
Tomb of Guanyu At Luoyang

Beliefs and customs for Guanyu ("关公信俗") is a collective term for various folk customs related to the worship of Guan Yu. Local people conduct this activity around Guanlin Tample. The ceremonies contain ritualistic elements such as sacrificial offerings, directional bows, obeisance, and circular tomb rites. These all presided over by the county magistrate. It encompasses a wide range of elements such as rituals, folk traditions, myths, legends, dramas, couplets, and more.

Cao Tun ceremonial drum("曹屯排鼓") was primarily used for rituals and worshipping deities. Now, the Cao Tun ceremonial drum integrates into the lives of the people. It embodies the aspirations of the people for dispelling evil, avoiding disasters, and seeking blessings. The drumming routines and musical compositions were created 300 years ago. The props used in performances include ceremonial drums, bronze instruments, and firearms.
