= G60 Shanghai–Kunming Expressway =

Road in China

Shanghai–Kunming Expressway
- 上海－昆明高速公路
- Hukun Expressway 沪昆高速公路

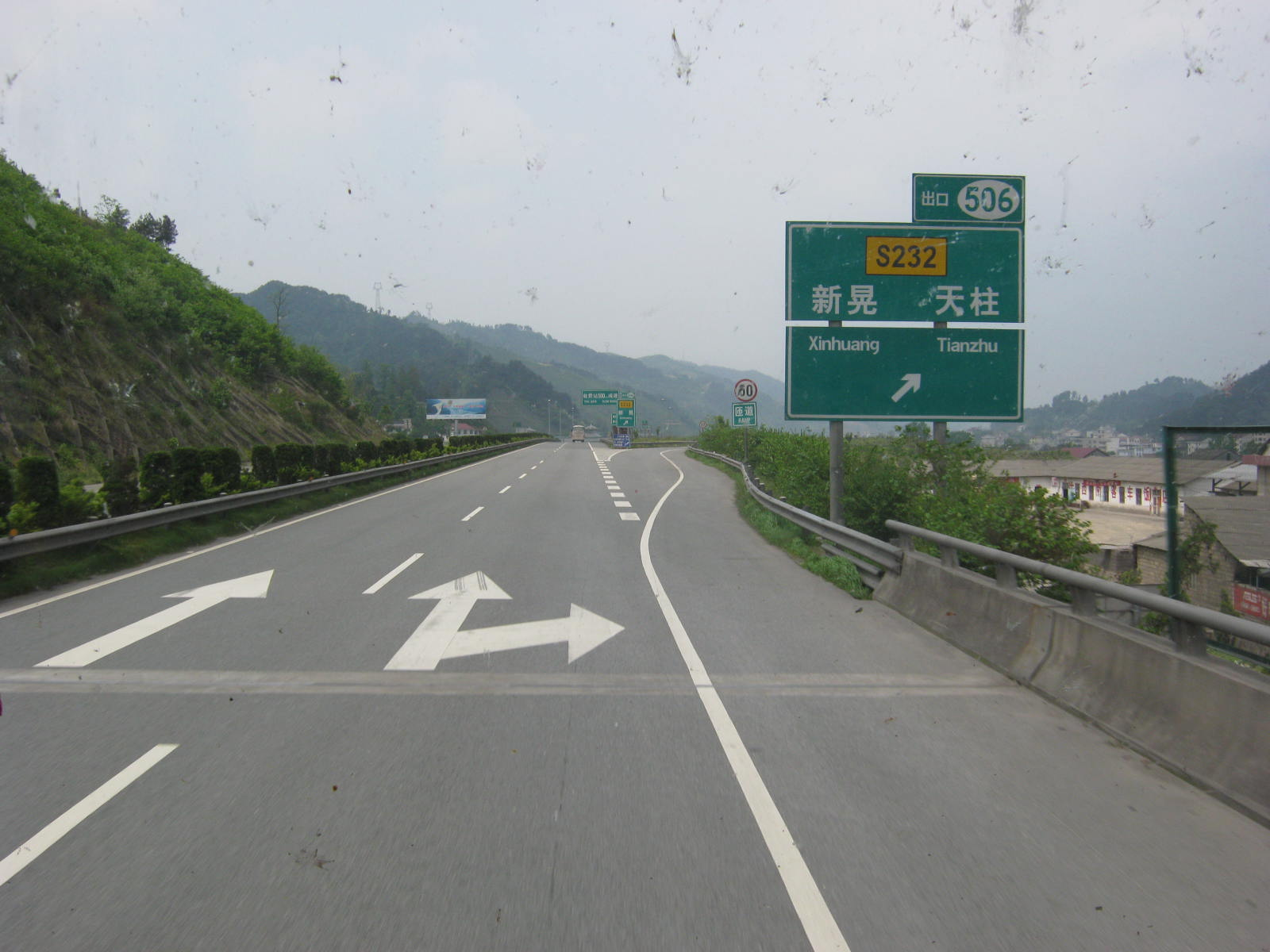
- A rural section of the Shanghai–Kunming Expressway in Xinhuang Dong Autonomous County, in the province of Hunan

Route information
- Part of AH3
- Length: 2,360 km (1,470 mi)

Major junctions
- East end: S20 Outer Ring Expressway, S4 Hujin Expressway and Humin Elevated Road, Minhang District, Shanghai
- West end: 2nd Ring Road, Kunming, Yunnan

Location
- Country: China

Highway system
- National Trunk Highway System; Primary; Auxiliary; National Highways; Transport in China
← G5912	→ G6001

The Shanghai–Kunming Expressway (Chinese: 上海—昆明高速公路), designated as G60 and commonly referred to as the Hukun Expressway (Chinese: 沪昆高速公路) is an expressway that connects the cities of Shanghai and Yunnan province's capital Kunming in China. It is 2,360 km (1,470 mi) in length. The entire route forms part of Asian Highway 3.

== Route ==
The Shanghai portion of the Shanghai–Kunming Expressway was originally designated A8 by the municipal government and was also known as the Shanghai–Hangzhou Expressway. In Shanghai, the Shanghai–Kunming Expressway is a concurrency for its entire length with G92 Hangzhou Bay Ring Expressway.

The Zhejiang portion of the expressway runs from the Shanghai border to the Jiangxi border, passing through the cities of Hangzhou, Jinhua, and Quzhou.

The Jiangxi portion of the expressway passes through the cities of Shangrao, Nanchang, Yichun, and Pingxiang.

The Hunan section of the expressway passes through the cities of Zhuzhou, Shaoyang, and Huaihua.

The portion of the expressway connecting Sansui County and Kaili City is known as the Sankai Expressway. The Kaima Expressway connects Kaili City to Majiang County.

The portion of the expressway connecting Guiyang City and Zhenning County is known as the Qingzhen Expressway.

In Yunnan Province, the expressway passes through the city of Qujing before terminating in Kunming.

== Gallery ==
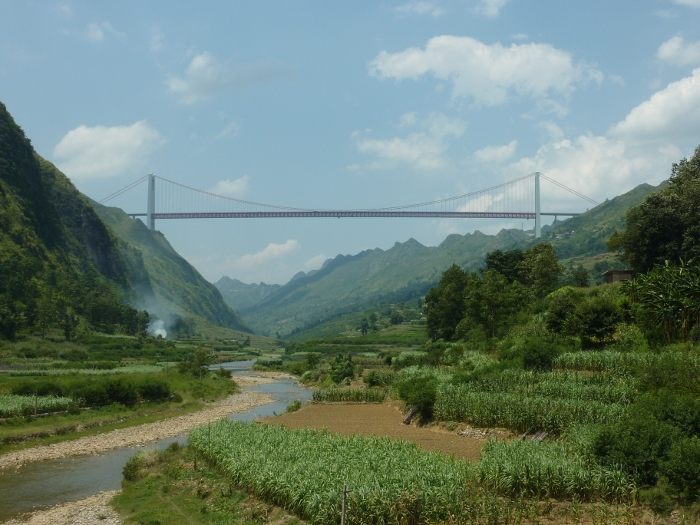
Baling River Bridge in Guanling Buyei and Miao Autonomous County

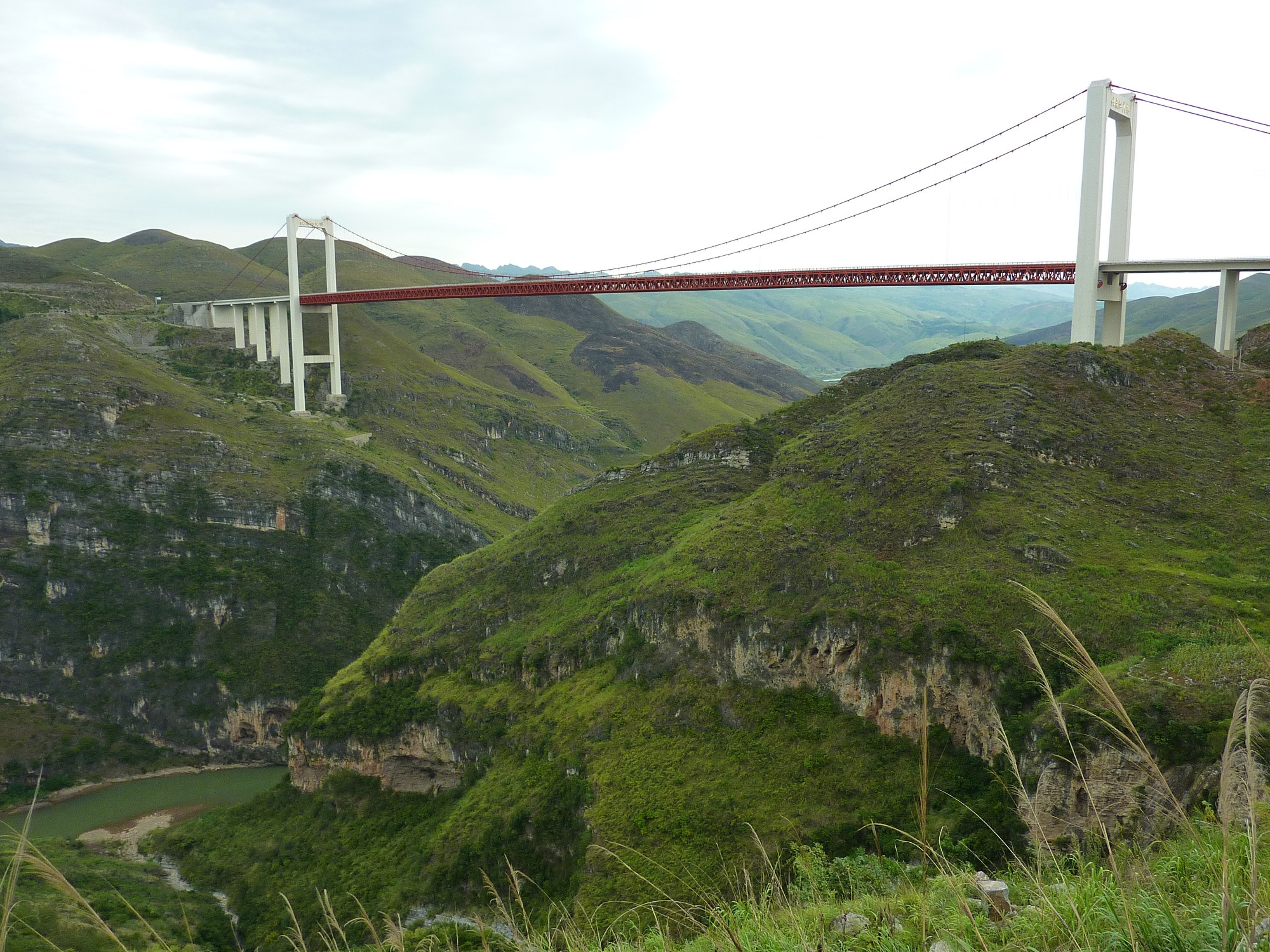
Beipan River Hukun Expressway Bridge on the border of Guanling County and Anshun Prefecture

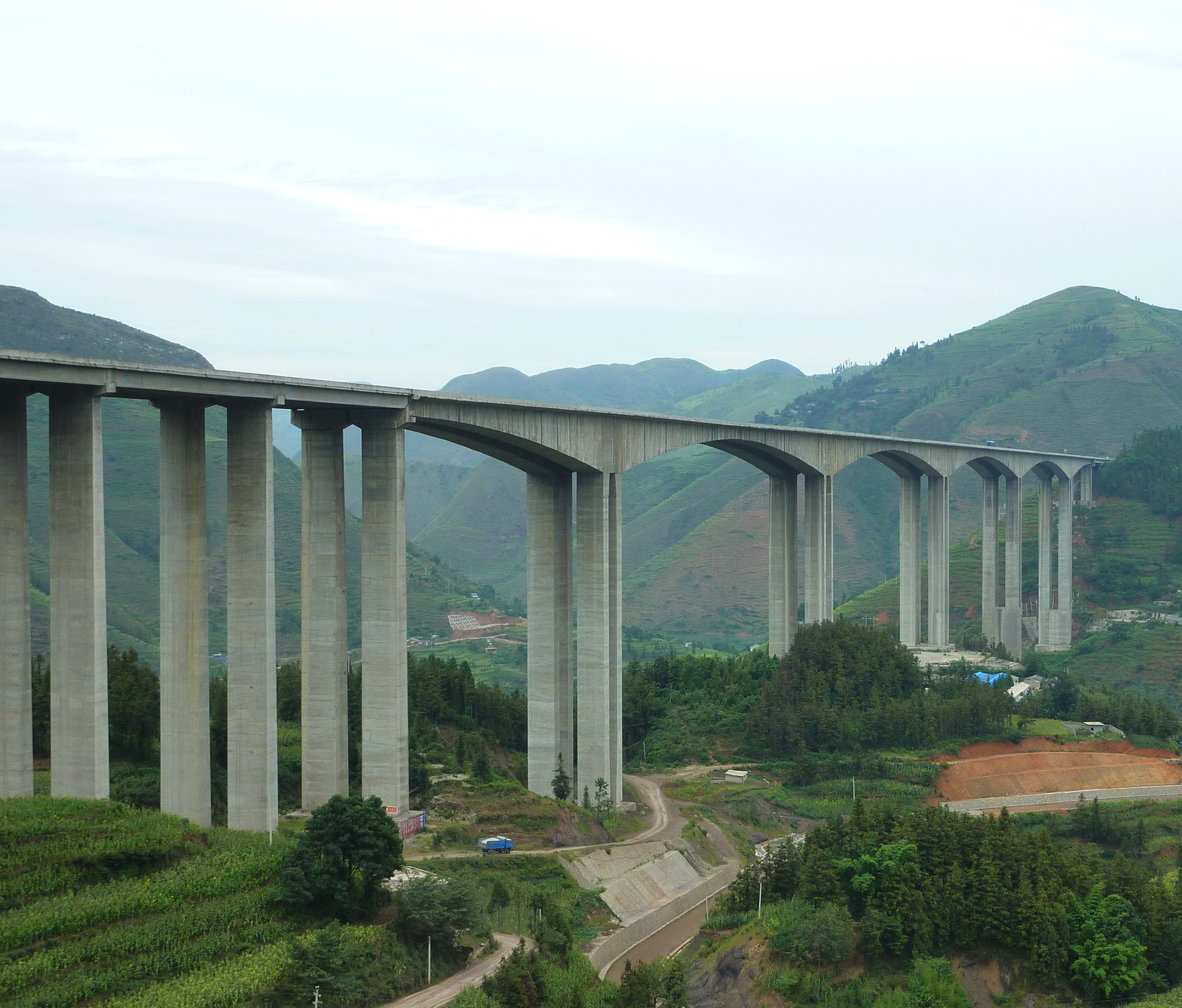
Hutiaohe Bridge on the border of Pan and Pu'an County

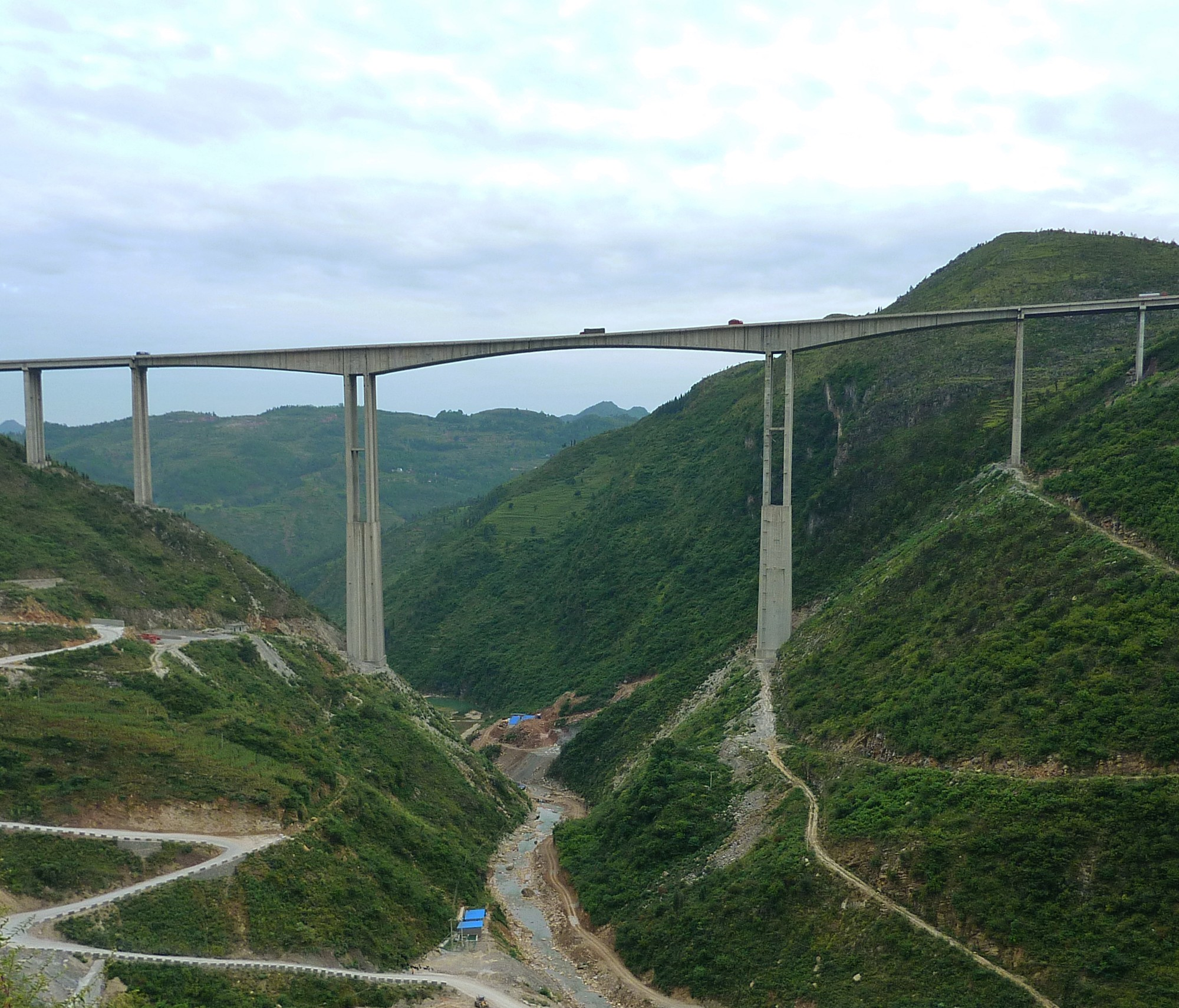
Zhuchanghe River Bridge in Pan County
