= Anle Township, Jiuzhaigou County =

Anle Township 安乐乡
- Township
- Location in Sichuan
- Coordinates (Anle Township government): 33°16′54″N 104°13′48″E
- Country: People's Republic of China
- Province: Sichuan
- Autonomous Prefecture: Ngawa
- County: Jiuzhaigou
- Time zone: UTC+8 (China Standard)

Anle Township (simplified Chinese: 安乐乡; traditional Chinese: 安樂鄉; pinyin: Ānlè Xiāng) is a township under the administration of Jiuzhaigou County in Ngawa Tibetan and Qiang Autonomous Prefecture, northern Sichuan, China. As of 2018, it has 11 villages under its administration.

== See also ==
- List of township-level divisions of Sichuan
