= Bailang River Bridge Ferris Wheel =

Ferris wheel in Weifang, Shandong, China

Coordinates: 37.108717°N 119.179345°E

The Bailang River Bridge Ferris Wheel is a centreless non-rotating Ferris wheel built on the 1,771-foot (540 m) Bailang River Bridge that crosses the Bailang river in Weifang, Shandong, China.

The structure has a height of 145 metres (476 ft) and when completed in 2017 became the world's largest centreless Ferris wheel.

== Design ==
Comprising 4,600 tons of steel and a kite grid construction system, described as a 'dragon spine', the body of the Ferris wheel remains stationary while each of the 36 carriages takes 30 minutes to fully traverse its circumference. Each carriage can carry 10 passengers and has Wi-Fi and television sets.
