= Liuchong River Bridge =

Liuchong River Bridge 六冲河特大桥
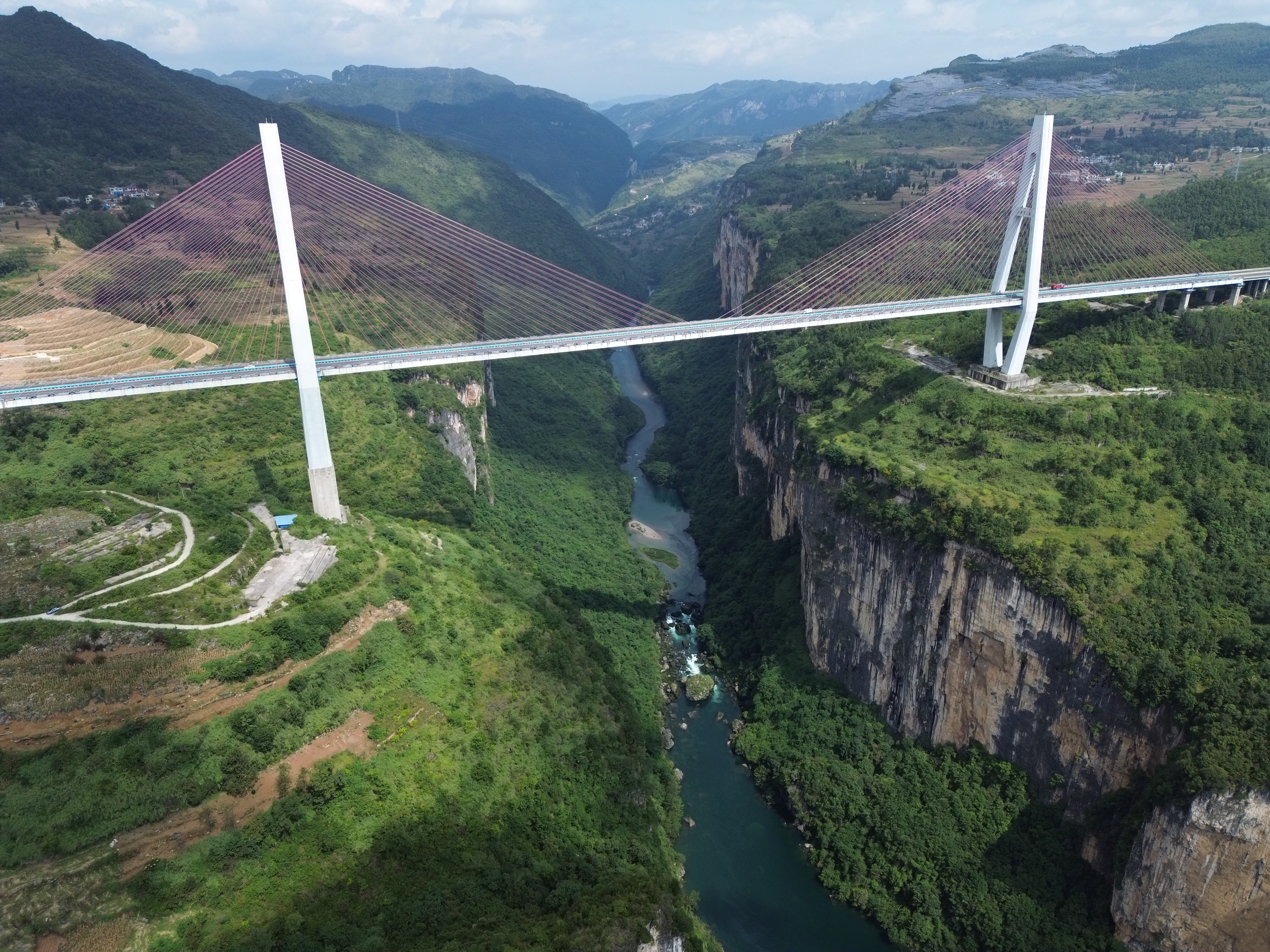
- Coordinates: 26.808138°N 105.885415°E
- Carries: G76 Xiamen–Chengdu Expressway
- Crosses: Liuchong River
- Other name: Liuchonghe Bridge

Characteristics
- Design: Cable-stayed
- Total length: 1,508 m (4,948 ft)
- Height: 190.1 m (624 ft)
- Longest span: 438 m (1,437 ft)
- Clearance below: 340 m (1,120 ft)

History
- Opened: 2013

Location
- Interactive map of Liuchong River Bridge

Liuchong River Bridge is a cable-stayed bridge near Zhijin, Guizhou, China. At 340 m (1,120 ft), the bridge is one of the 20 highest in world. The bridge is part of the new S55 Qianzhi Expressway between Zhijin and Qianxi in Guizhou province that opened in 2013. The bridge crosses the Liuchong River gorge.

== See also ==
- List of highest bridges in the world
- List of tallest bridges in the world
- List of largest cable-stayed bridges
