= Zhuchanghe River Bridge =

Zhuchanghe River Bridge 朱昌河特大桥
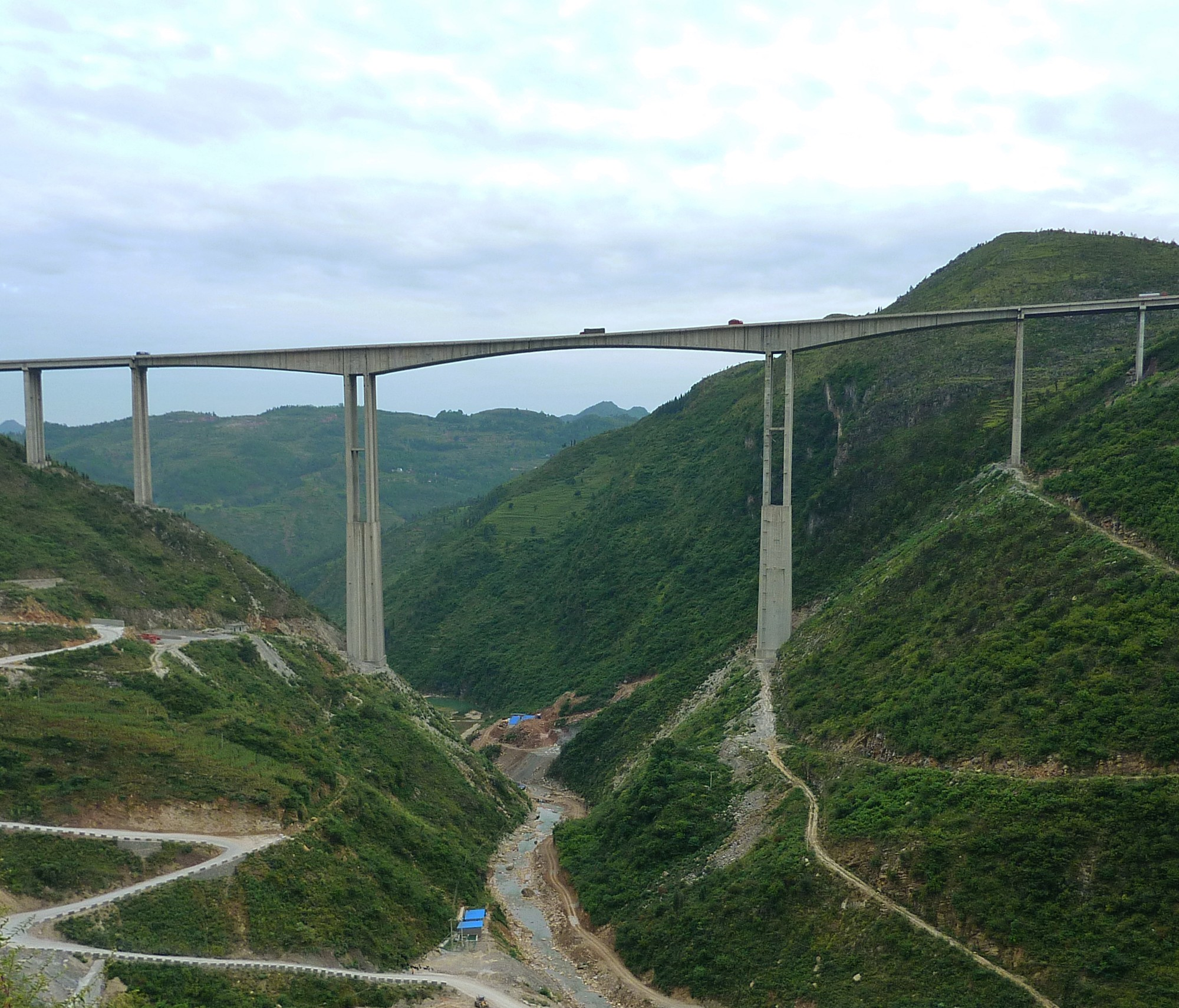
- Coordinates: 25.795216°N 104.807503°E
- Carries: G60 Shanghai–Kunming Expressway
- Locale: Pan County, Liupanshui, Guizhou

Characteristics
- Design: Beam Bridge
- Material: Concrete
- Total length: 672 metres (2,205 ft)
- Height: 224 metres (735 ft)
- Longest span: 200 metres (660 ft)

History
- Opened: 2008

Location
- Interactive map of Zhuchanghe River Bridge

Zhuchanghe River Bridge is a 224-metre-high (735 ft) concrete beam bridge in Pan County, Liupanshui, Guizhou, China. As of 2019, it is among the sixty highest bridges in the world. The bridge is located on G60 Shanghai–Kunming Expressway and crosses the valley of the Zhuchanghe River a small tributary of the Beipan River.

== See also ==
List of highest bridges in the world
