= Hutiaohe Bridge =

Hutiao River Viaduct 虎跳河大桥
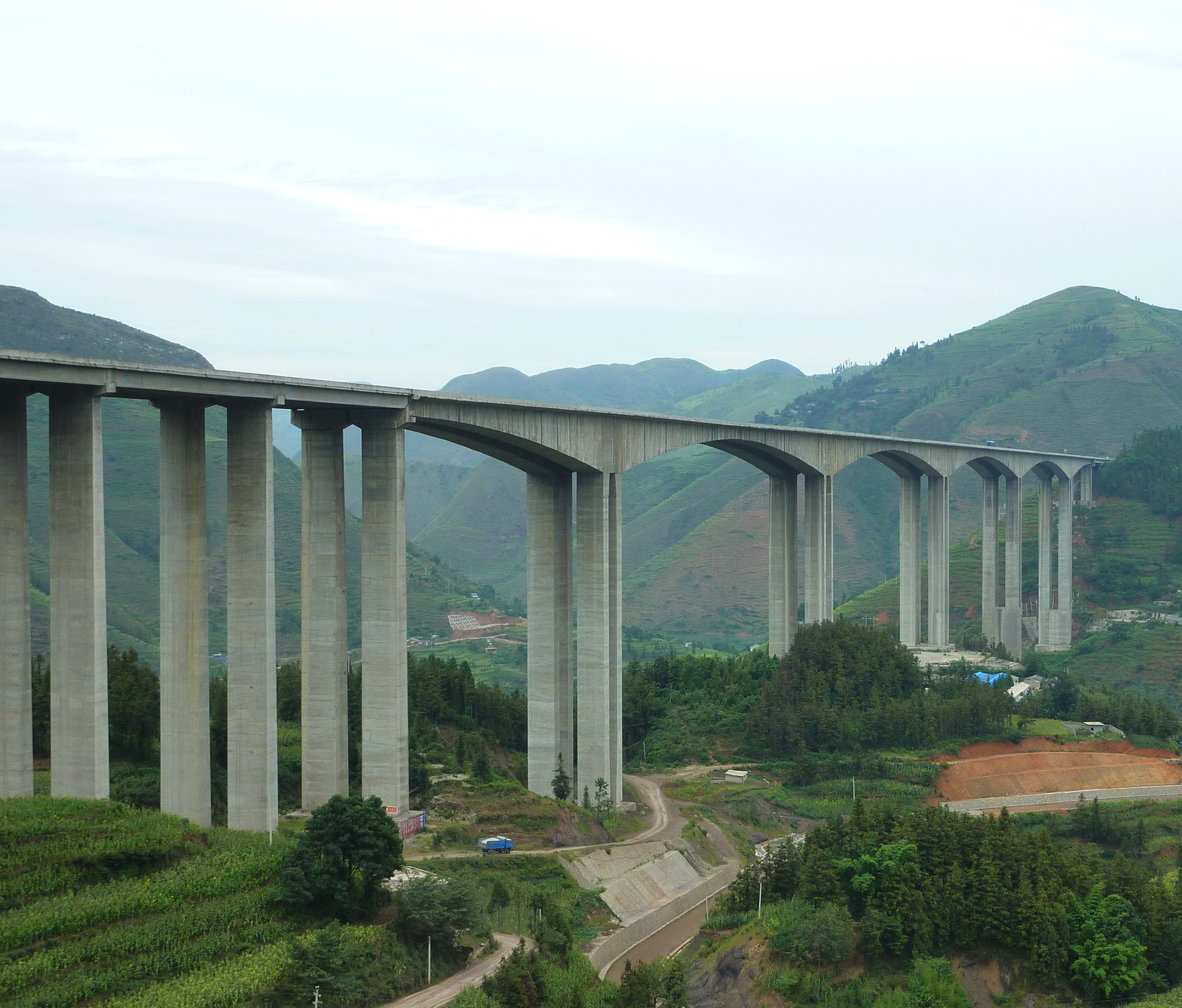
- Coordinates: 25.804583°N 104.870917°E
- Carries: G60 Shanghai–Kunming Expressway
- Locale: Pan County and Pu'an County, Guizhou

Characteristics
- Design: Box girder bridge
- Material: Prestressed concrete
- Total length: 1,958 metres (6,424 ft)
- Height: 150 metres (490 ft)
- Longest span: 225 metres (738 ft)
- Clearance below: 209 metres (686 ft)

History
- Opened: 2007

Location
- Interactive map of Hutiao River Viaduct

The Hutiao River Viaduct is a prestressed concrete box girder bridge on the border of Pan County and Pu'an County in Guizhou, China. The bridge is 1,958 metres (6,424 ft) and forms part of the G60 Shanghai–Kunming Expressway. It stands at a height of 209 metres (686 ft) above the river, placing it amongst the highest bridges in the world.

== See also ==
- List of highest bridges in the world
