= Puji Bridge (Zunyi) =

Bridge in Zunyi, Guizhou, China

Puji Bridge 普济桥
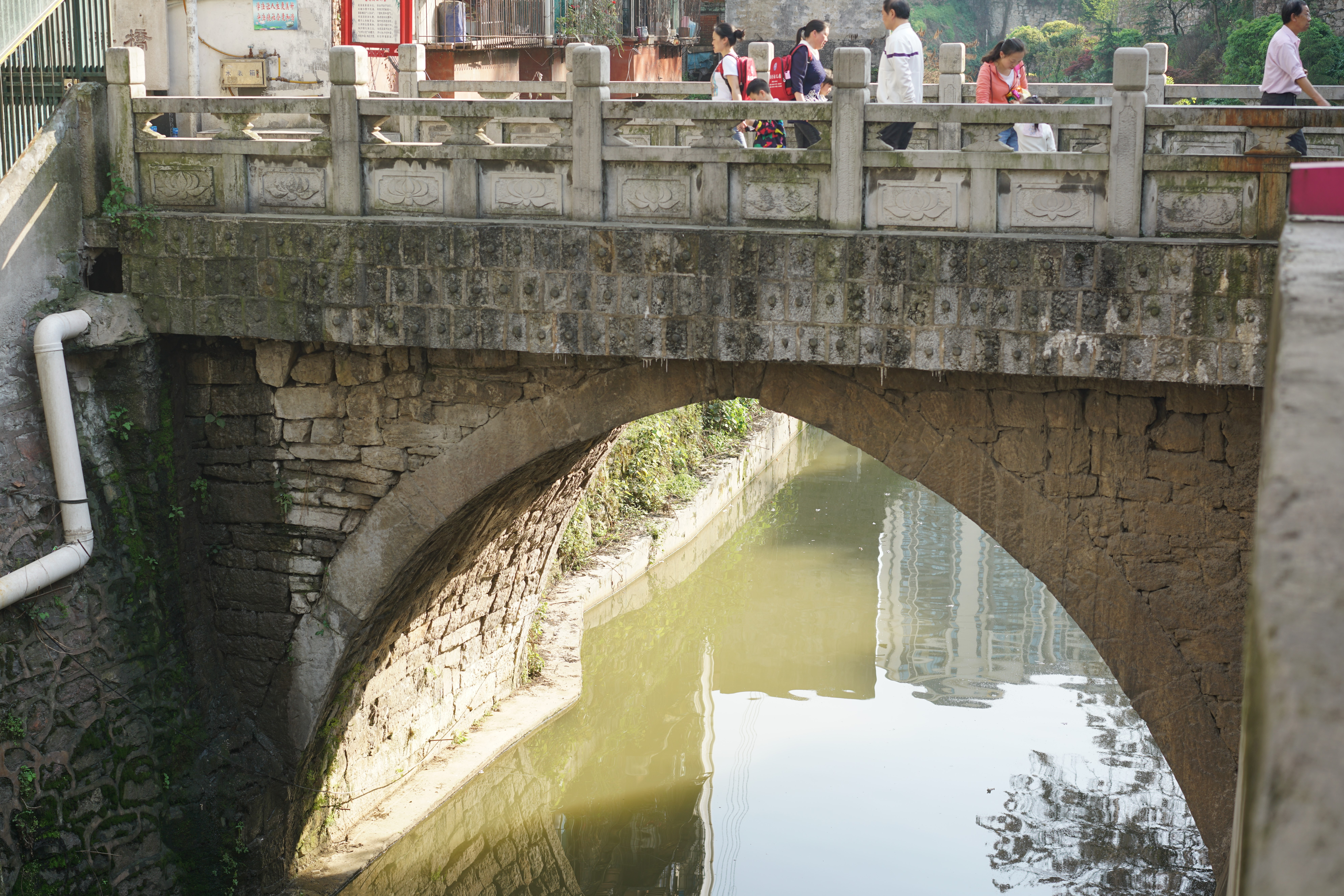
- The Puji Bridge in April 2019.
- Coordinates: 27°42′10″N 106°54′30″E
- Crosses: Gaoqiao River
- Locale: Zunyi, Guizhou, China
- Other name(s): Houchuan Bridge; High Bridge

Characteristics
- Design: Arch Bridge
- Material: Stone
- Total length: 14 metres (46 ft)
- Width: 6 metres (20 ft)
- Height: 5 metres (16 ft)
- Longest span: 7 metres (23 ft)

History
- Construction start: Southern Song dynasty (1127–1279)
- Construction end: 1628–1644 (reconstruction)

The Puji Bridge (simplified Chinese: 普济桥; traditional Chinese: 普濟橋; pinyin: Pǔjì Qiáo), also known as Houchuan Bridge (Chinese: 后川桥) and High Bridge (Chinese: 高桥), is a historic stone arch bridge over the Gaoqiao River (高桥河) in Zunyi, Guizhou, China.

== History ==
The original bridge dates back to the Southern Song dynasty (1127–1279) and was built by Yang Can (杨粲), a local tusi in Guizhou. It was named after Puji Temple, a neighbouring Buddhist temple. It was rebuilt in the following Yuan dynasty (1271–1368). The bridge was destroyed by a catastrophic flood in the Jiajing era (1522–1566) of the Ming dynasty (1368–1644) and was restored in the Chongzhen era (1628–1644).

In 1985, it was designated as a provincial level cultural heritage by Guizhou Provincial Government.

== Architecture ==
The bridge was made of red sandstone. It measures 14 metres (46 ft) long, 6 metres (20 ft) wide, and approximately 5 metres (16 ft) high.
