= Anle Township, Hanyuan County =

Anle Township 安乐乡
- Township
- Location in Sichuan
- Coordinates: 29°21′8″N 102°43′49″E
- Country: People's Republic of China
- Province: Sichuan
- Prefecture-level city: Ya'an
- County: Hanyuan County
- Time zone: UTC+8 (China Standard)

Anle Township (simplified Chinese: 安乐乡; traditional Chinese: 安樂鄉; pinyin: Ānlè Xiāng) is a township under the administration of Hanyuan County in Sichuan, China. As of 2018, it has seven villages under its administration.

== See also ==
- List of township-level divisions of Sichuan
