= Maling River Shankun Expressway Bridge =

Malinghe River Bridge 马岭河大桥
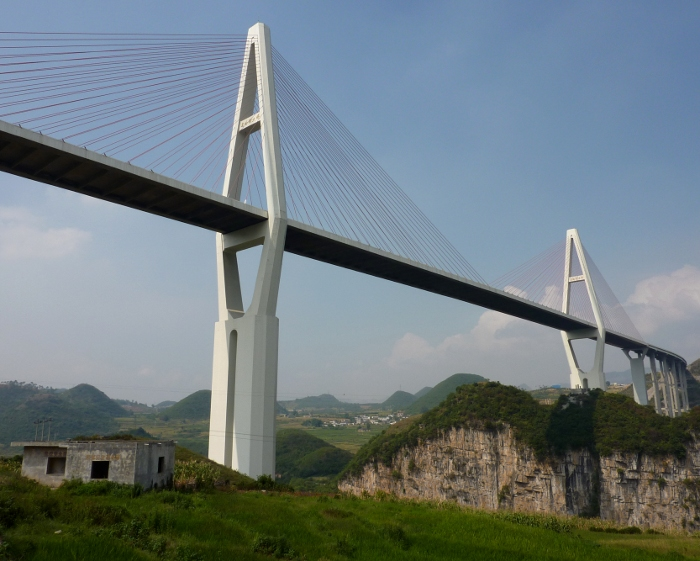
- Coordinates: 25.1566°N 104.9439°E
- Carries: G78 Shantou–Kunming Expressway
- Locale: Xingyi, Guizhou, China

Characteristics
- Design: Cable-stayed
- Height: 241 metres (791 ft)
- Longest span: 360 metres (1,180 ft)

History
- Construction end: 2011

Location
- Interactive map of Malinghe River Bridge

Malinghe River Bridge is a 241 metre high cable-stayed bridge near Xingyi, in the Guizhou province of China. As of 2019, it is among the 50 highest bridges in the world. The bridge is located on G78 Shantou–Kunming Expressway and crosses the Maling River Canyon. The Maling River is a tributary of the Nanpan River.

== See also ==
- List of highest bridges in the world
- Zhaozhuang Bridge
