= Anle Subdistrict, Luoyang =

Anle Subdistrict 安乐街道
- Subdistrict
- Location in Henan
- Coordinates: 34°39′31″N 112°27′50″E
- Country: People's Republic of China
- Province: Henan
- Prefecture-level city: Luoyang
- District: Luolong District
- Time zone: UTC+8 (China Standard)

Anle Subdistrict (simplified Chinese: 安乐街道; traditional Chinese: 安樂街道; pinyin: Ānlè Jiēdào) is a subdistrict in Luolong District, Luoyang, Henan province, China. As of 2018, it has 2 residential communities under its administration.

== See also ==
- List of township-level divisions of Henan
