= Hongjiadu Dam =

- Location within China
- Country: China
- Location: Qianxi County, Guizhou Province
- Coordinates: 26°52′11″N 105°51′32″E
- Status: In use
- Construction began: 2001
- Opening date: 2005

Dam and spillways
- Type of dam: Embankment, concrete face rock-fill
- Impounds: Liuchong River
- Height: 179.5 metres (589 ft)
- Length: 427.8 metres (1,404 ft)
- Width (crest): 10.95 metres (36 ft)
- Dam volume: 9,200,000 cubic metres (324,894,934 ft^{3})

Reservoir
- Creates: Hongjiadu Reservoir
- Total capacity: 4,947,000,000 cubic metres (4,010,598 acre⋅ft)
- Catchment area: 9,900 square kilometres (3,822 sq mi)
- Surface area: 80.5 square kilometres (31 sq mi)

Power Station
- Installed capacity: 600 MW
- Annual generation: 1.559 TWh

The Hongjiadu Dam is a concrete face rock-fill embankment dam on the Liuchong River in Qianxi County, Guizhou Province, China. The dam is 179.5 metres (589 ft) tall and was built for the purposes of hydroelectric power generation and water supply. The dam supports a 600 MW and withholds a 4,947,000,000 cubic metres (4,010,598 acre⋅ft) reservoir.

== See also ==
- List of power stations in China
