= Azhihe River Bridge =

Azhihe River Bridge 阿志河大桥
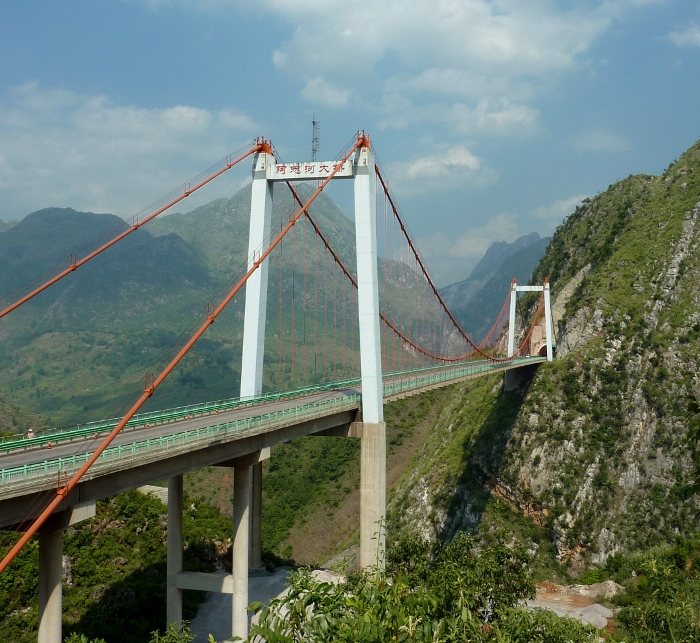
- Coordinates: 26.216083°N 105.196643°E
- Carries: Shuihuang highway
- Crosses: Azhihe River
- Locale: Changliuxiang, Guizhou, China

Characteristics
- Design: Suspension Bridge
- Material: Steel
- Height: 247 metres (810 ft)
- Longest span: 283 metres (928 ft)

History
- Designer: Major Bridge Reconnaissance Design Institute
- Opened: 2003

Location
- Interactive map of Azhihe River Bridge

Azhihe River Bridge is a 247-metre-high (810 ft) suspension bridge in the Liuzhi Special District, Guizhou, China. As of 2019, it is among the fifty highest bridges in the world. The bridge is located on the Shuihuang highway between Guanling and Liupanshui.

== See also ==
List of highest bridges in the world
