= Anle Township, Chengdu =

Anle Township 安乐乡
- Township
- Location in Sichuan
- Coordinates: 30°21′4″N 104°45′52″E
- Country: People's Republic of China
- Province: Sichuan
- Sub-provincial city: Chengdu
- County-level city: Jianyang
- Time zone: UTC+8 (China Standard)

Anle Township (simplified Chinese: 安乐乡; traditional Chinese: 安樂鄉; pinyin: Ānlè Xiāng) is a township under the administration of Jianyang in Chengdu, Sichuan, China. As of 2018, it has eight villages under its administration.

== See also ==
- List of township-level divisions of Sichuan
