= Zhaozhuang Bridge =

Zhaozhuang Bridge 马岭河大桥
- Coordinates: 25.1146°N 104.9800°E
- Crosses: Maling River
- Locale: Xingyi, Guizhou, China

Characteristics
- Design: Arch
- Width: 40 metres (130 ft)
- Height: 329 metres (1,079 ft)
- Longest span: 410 metres (1,350 ft)

History
- Opened: Expected 2028

Location
- Interactive map of Zhaozhuang Bridge

Zhaozhuang Bridge is a 410 metre long arch bridge currently under construction in Xingyi, in the Guizhou province of China. When it is completed it will be the highest arch bridge in the world. It will rank among the 20 highest bridges of any type and be among the 20 longest arch bridges. The bridge crosses the Maling River Canyon. The Maling River is a tributary of the Nanpan River.

The bridge will carry three lanes of traffic in each direction, the double tracks of a light rail line on the Xingyi Metro, and two pedestrian walkways on either side of the bridge. The bridge will be 40 metres wide.

== See also ==
Maling River Shankun Expressway Bridge
