= Anle Township, Yunnan =

Anle Township 安乐乡
- Township
- Location in Yunnan
- Coordinates: 25°28′23″N 101°40′4″E
- Country: People's Republic of China
- Province: Yunnan
- Autonomous prefecture: Chuxiong Yi Autonomous Prefecture
- County: Mouding County
- Time zone: UTC+8 (China Standard)

Anle Township (simplified Chinese: 安乐乡; traditional Chinese: 安樂鄉; pinyin: Ānlè Xiāng) is a township under the administration of Mouding County in Chuxiong Yi Autonomous Prefecture, Yunnan, China. As of 2018, it has 13 villages under its administration.
