= Anle Town, Luoyang =

Anle 安乐镇
- Town
- Location in Henan
- Coordinates: 34°39′29″N 112°27′48″E
- Country: People's Republic of China
- Province: Henan
- Prefecture-level city: Luoyang
- District: Luolong District
- Time zone: UTC+8 (China Standard)

Anle (Chinese: 安乐镇) is a town in Luolong District, Luoyang, Henan province, China. As of 2018, it has 16 villages under its administration.
