= Anle Yi and Gelao Ethnic Township =

Anle Yi and Gelao Ethnic Township 安乐彝族仡佬族乡
- Ethnic township
- Location in China
- Coordinates: 27°14′39″N 105°39′28″E
- Country: People's Republic of China
- Province: Guizhou
- Prefecture-level city: Bijie
- County: Dafang County
- Time zone: China Standard

Anle Yi and Gelao Ethnic Township (simplified Chinese: 安乐彝族仡佬族乡; traditional Chinese: 安樂彝族仡佬族鄉; pinyin: Ānlè Yí Zú Gēlǎo Zú Xiāng) is an ethnic township for Yi people and Gelao people, under the administration of Dafang County in western Guizhou province, China. As of 2018, it has 2 residential communities and 6 villages under its administration.

== See also ==
- List of township-level divisions of Guizhou
