= Anle, Fujian =

Anle 安乐镇
- Town
- Location in Fujian
- Coordinates: 26.1072°N 116.7398°E
- Country: People's Republic of China
- Province: Fujian
- Prefecture-level city: Sanming
- County: Ninghua County
- Time zone: UTC+8 (China Standard)

Anle (Chinese: 安乐镇) is a town in Ninghua County, in western Fujian province, China. As of 2018, it has one residential community and 11 villages under its administration.
