= Liuchong River =

Coordinates: 26°45′50″N 105°57′45″E

Liuchong
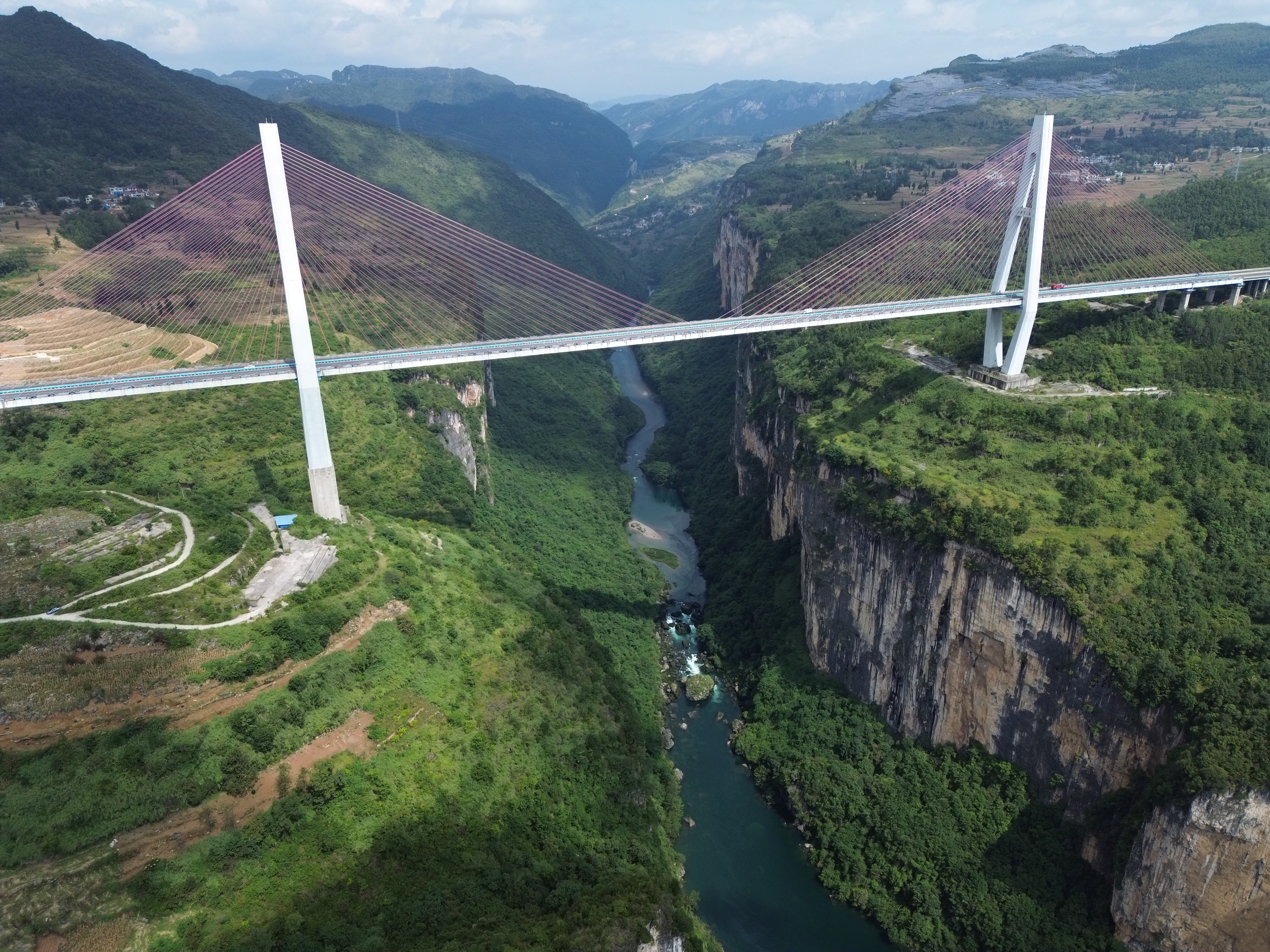
- The Liuchonghe Bridge over the Liuchong River

Location
- Country: China
- Region: Guizhou

Physical characteristics
- Mouth
  - location: Wu River

Basin features
- River system: Wu River and Yangtze River

The Liuchong River is a tributary of the Wu River in Guizhou Province, China. It is interrupted by the Hongjiadu Dam.
