= Dafang County =

Dafang County 大方县
- County
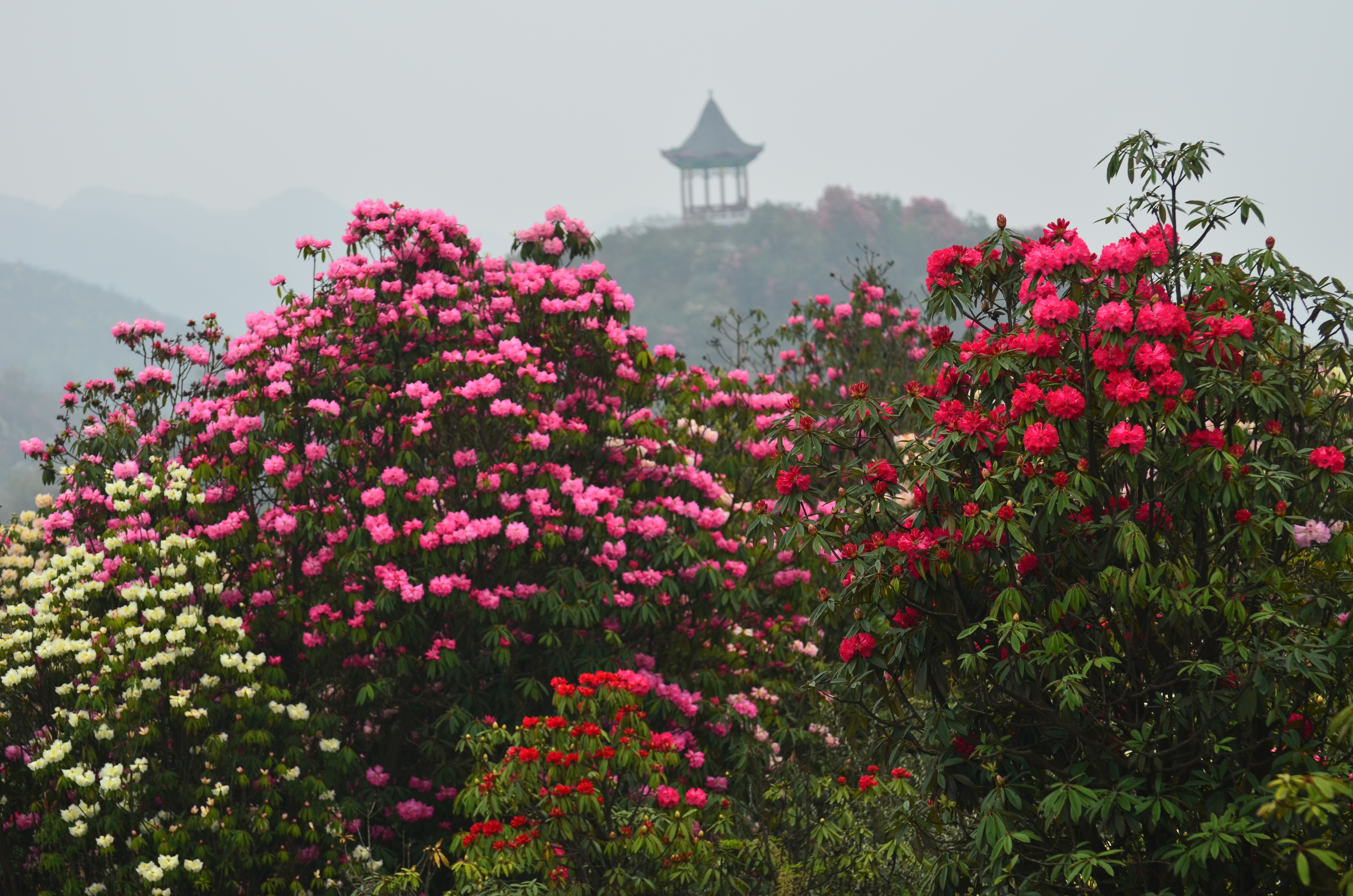

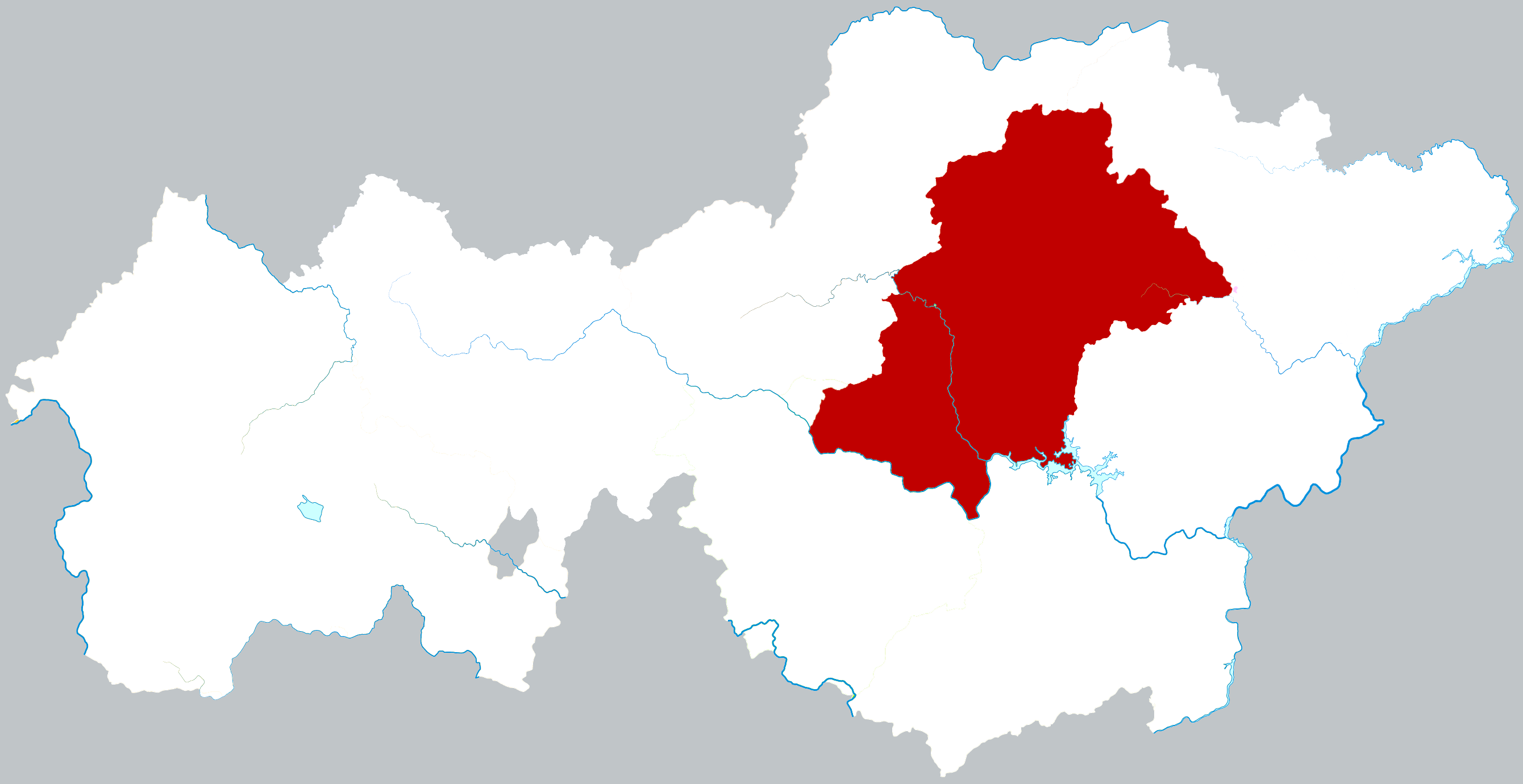
- Dafang in Bijie

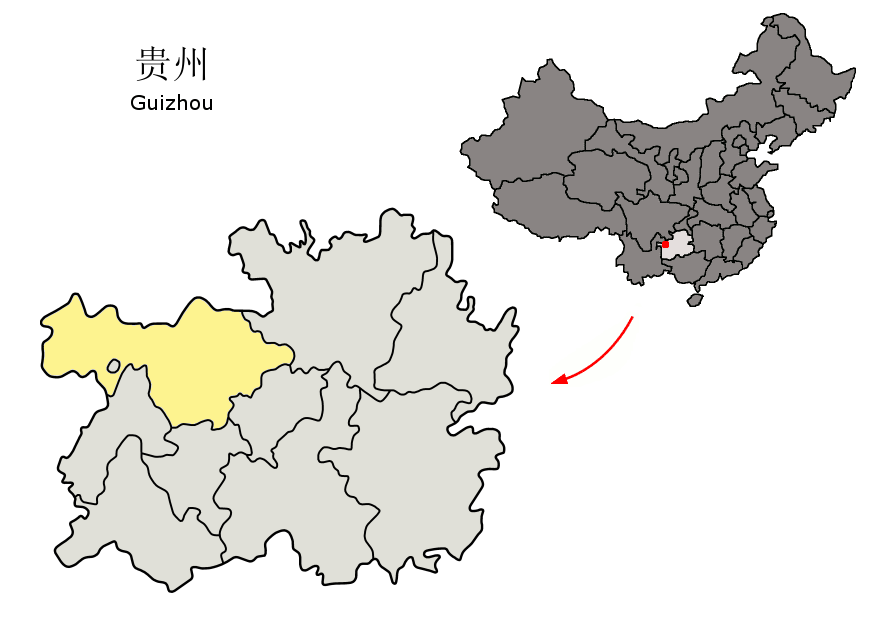
- Bijie in Guizhou
- Coordinates (Dafang County government): 27°08′40″N 105°36′07″E
- Country: China
- Province: Guizhou
- Prefecture-level city: Bijie
- County seat: Hongqi

Area
  - Total: 3,500.11 km^{2} (1,351.40 sq mi)

Population (2010)
  - Total: 776,324
  - Density: 221.800/km^{2} (574.459/sq mi)
- Time zone: UTC+8 (China Standard)

Dafang (Chinese: 大方; pinyin: Dàfāng), called Dading (Chinese: 大定) until 1958, is a county of Guizhou province, China. It is under the administration of Bijie city.

== Administrative divisions ==
Dafang County is divided into 6 subdistricts, 10 towns, 6 townships and 18 ethnic townships:

subdistricts

- Hongqi Subdistrict 红旗街道
- Shunde Subdistrict 顺德街道
- Mu'ege Gucheng Subdistrict 慕俄格古城街道
- Jiuyi Subdistrict 九驿街道
- Guihua Subdistrict 归化街道
- Pengcheng Subdistrict 鹏程街道

townships

- Dongguan Township 东关乡
- Wenge Township 文阁乡
- Lütang Township 绿塘乡
- Xiaotun Township 小屯乡
- Guowa Township 果瓦乡
- Yuchong Township 雨冲乡

towns

- Shuangshan Town 双山镇
- Maochang Town 猫场镇
- Machang Town 马场镇
- Yangchang Town 羊场镇
- Huangnitang Town 黄泥塘镇
- Liulong Town 六龙镇
- Daxi Town 达溪镇
- Piaojing Town 瓢井镇
- Changshi Town 长石镇
- Duijiang Town 对江镇

ethnic townships

- Zhuyuan Yi and Miao Ethnic Township 竹园彝族苗族乡
- Xiangshui Bai, Yi and Gelao Ethnic Township 响水白族彝族仡佬族乡
- Dingxin Yi and Miao Ethnic Township 鼎新彝族苗族乡
- Niuchang Miao and Yi Ethnic Township 牛场苗族彝族乡
- Lihua Miao and Yi Ethnic Township 理化苗族彝族乡
- Fengshan Yi and Mongolian Ethnic Township 凤山彝族蒙古族乡
- Anle Yi and Gelao Ethnic Township 安乐彝族仡佬族乡
- Hetao Yi and Bai Ethnic Township 核桃彝族白族乡
- Babao Yi and Miao Ethnic Township 八堡彝族苗族乡
- Xinglong Miao Ethnic Township 兴隆苗族乡
- Dashan Miao and Yi Ethnic Township 大山苗族彝族乡
- Huangni Yi, Miao and Manchu Ethnic Township 黄泥彝族苗族满族乡
- Dashui Yi, Miao and Bouyei Ethnic Township 大水彝族苗族布依族乡
- Shachang Yi Ethnic Township 沙厂彝族乡
- Pudi Yi, Miao and Bai Ethnic Township 普底彝族苗族白族乡
- Baina Yi Ethnic Township 百纳彝族乡
- Sanyuan Yi, Miao and Bai Ethnic Township 三元彝族苗族白族乡
- Xingsu Miao, Yi and Gelao Ethnic Township 星宿苗族彝族仡佬族乡

== Climate ==
Climate data for Dafang, elevation 1,722 m (5,650 ft), (1991–2020 normals, extremes 1981–2010)
Month	Jan	Feb	Mar	Apr	May	Jun	Jul	Aug	Sep	Oct	Nov	Dec	Year
Record high °C (°F)	22.0 (71.6)	28.6 (83.5)	32.2 (90.0)	31.4 (88.5)	32.7 (90.9)	31.3 (88.3)	31.1 (88.0)	30.9 (87.6)	32.6 (90.7)	27.6 (81.7)	24.8 (76.6)	20.2 (68.4)	32.7 (90.9)
Mean daily maximum °C (°F)	5.2 (41.4)	8.6 (47.5)	13.2 (55.8)	18.2 (64.8)	21.0 (69.8)	22.7 (72.9)	24.9 (76.8)	24.9 (76.8)	21.7 (71.1)	16.4 (61.5)	12.8 (55.0)	7.1 (44.8)	16.4 (61.5)
Daily mean °C (°F)	1.9 (35.4)	4.5 (40.1)	8.4 (47.1)	13.3 (55.9)	16.4 (61.5)	18.7 (65.7)	20.8 (69.4)	20.5 (68.9)	17.5 (63.5)	12.9 (55.2)	8.9 (48.0)	3.7 (38.7)	12.3 (54.1)
Mean daily minimum °C (°F)	0.0 (32.0)	1.9 (35.4)	5.5 (41.9)	10.1 (50.2)	13.2 (55.8)	16.0 (60.8)	18.0 (64.4)	17.5 (63.5)	14.7 (58.5)	10.6 (51.1)	6.4 (43.5)	1.6 (34.9)	9.6 (49.3)
Record low °C (°F)	−7.3 (18.9)	−6.5 (20.3)	−6.0 (21.2)	−0.6 (30.9)	2.9 (37.2)	8.5 (47.3)	9.5 (49.1)	11.9 (53.4)	6.3 (43.3)	−0.7 (30.7)	−3.9 (25.0)	−8.2 (17.2)	−8.2 (17.2)
Average precipitation mm (inches)	30.3 (1.19)	23.9 (0.94)	41.6 (1.64)	78.2 (3.08)	122.2 (4.81)	193.5 (7.62)	188.8 (7.43)	140.0 (5.51)	121.9 (4.80)	88.2 (3.47)	35.6 (1.40)	25.0 (0.98)	1,089.2 (42.87)
Average precipitation days (≥ 0.1 mm)	21.3	17.9	19.1	17.8	18.9	19.3	16.1	15.8	14.5	19.6	16.1	19.0	215.4
Average snowy days	8.7	4.9	1.4	0.1	0	0	0	0	0	0	0.8	4.3	20.2
Average relative humidity (%)	90	86	83	79	79	83	81	80	81	86	85	88	83
Mean monthly sunshine hours	48.0	65.3	95.8	117.3	123.5	101.1	159.2	158.0	123.0	74.1	83.3	55.2	1,203.8
Percentage possible sunshine	15	20	26	30	29	24	38	39	34	21	26	17	27
Source: China Meteorological Administration
