= List of road-rail bridges =

Bridges accommodating both road & railway

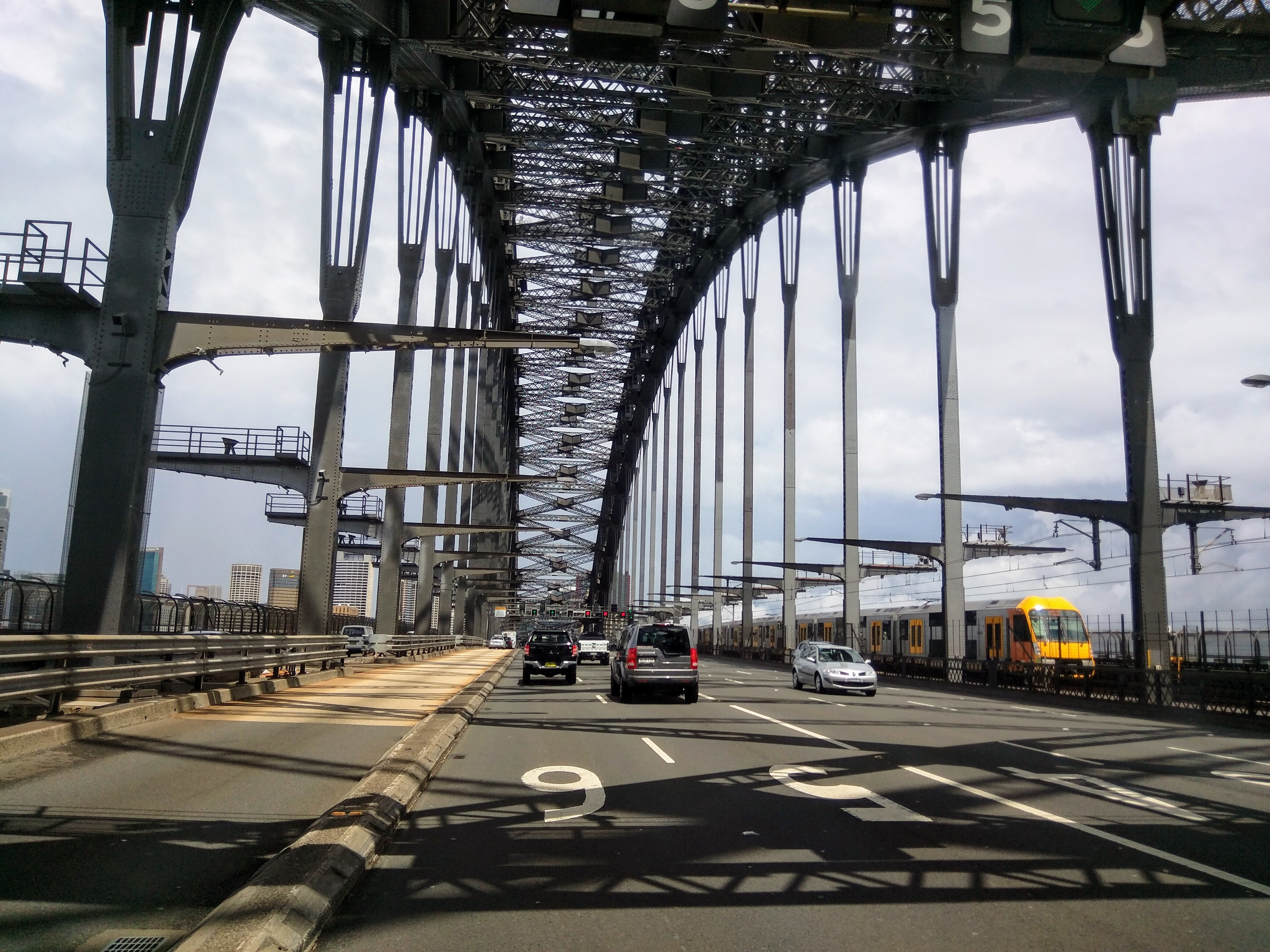
The Sydney Harbour Bridge, a steel through arch bridge, carrying both road and rail traffic in Sydney, Australia.

Road-rail bridges are bridges shared by road transport and rail transport (road-rail). They are sometimes called combined bridges.

The road and rail on these bridges are often on the same level, but segregated, so that rail vehicles could operate at the same time as road vehicles (e.g., Sydney Harbour Bridge). The roadway can also be above the rail tracks, or vice versa (e.g., Øresund Bridge, Oliver Bridge).

Sometimes, the road and rail share the same carriageway on the bridge (e.g., Dom Pedro II Bridge, Kongolo Bridge). In these cases, road traffic usually must stop when trains are using the bridge. However, if the bridge is wide enough, both kinds of traffic can operate together as well (e.g., Bechyně Bridge).

"Rail" in this case include all types of rail transport.

== Afghanistan ==
- Afghanistan–Uzbekistan Friendship Bridge

== Argentina ==
- Carmen de Patagones–Viedma Railway Bridge
- Paso de los Libres–Uruguaiana International Bridge
- Salto Grande Bridge
- San Roque González de Santa Cruz Bridge
- Zárate–Brazo Largo Bridge

== Australia ==
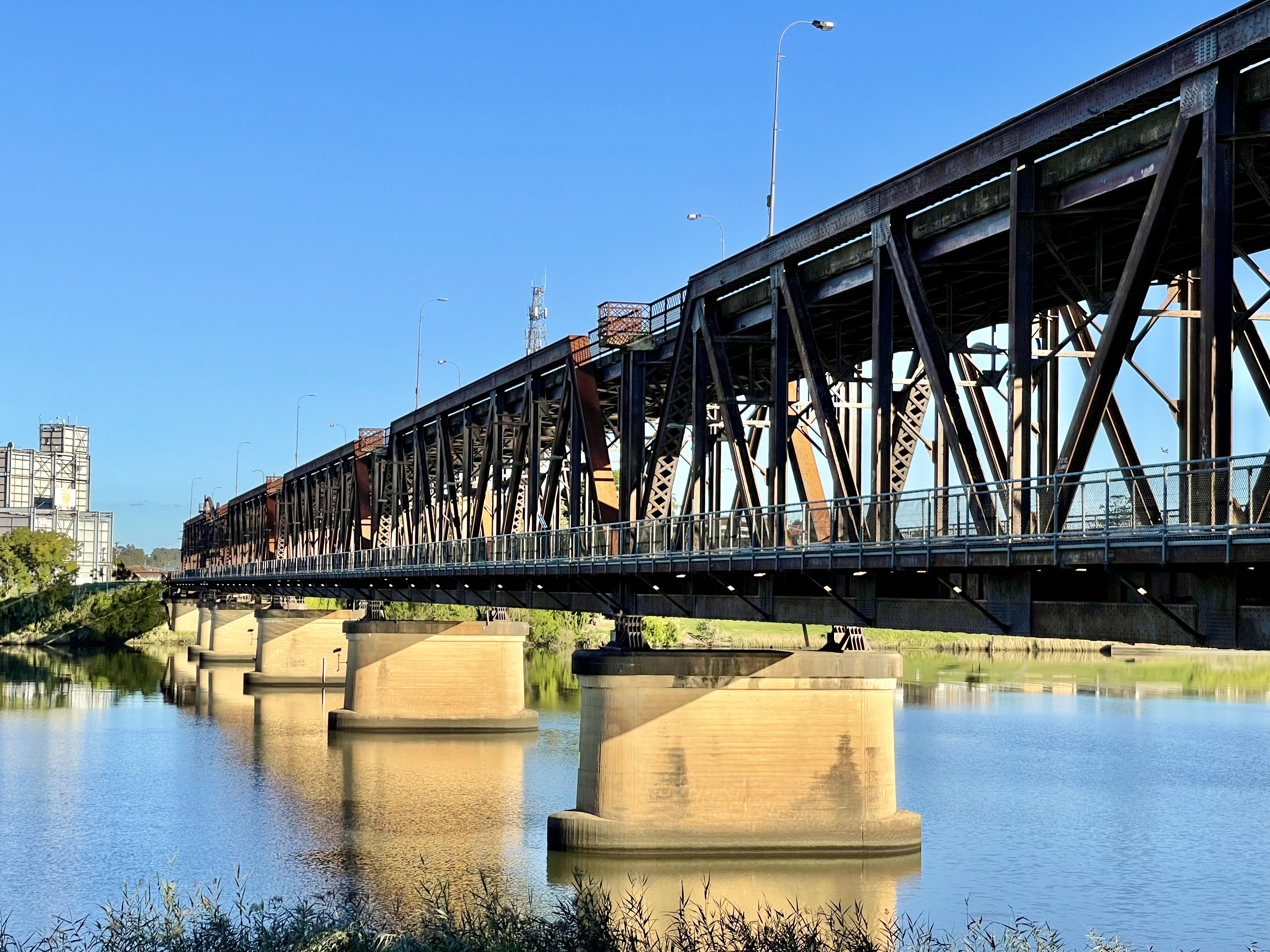
Grafton Bridge (New South Wales), with a road on its upper deck and a railway on its lower deck.

=== Current ===
- Sydney Harbour Bridge, Sydney, carried further two rail tracks as tram tracks from 1932 until 1958.
- Narrows Bridge, Perth, carries Mandurah railway line in central reservation
- Mount Henry Bridge, Perth, carries Mandurah railway line in central reservation
- Burdekin Bridge
- Bli Bli Bridge, carries David Low Way over Maroochy River, also carried Moreton Central Sugar Mill Cane Tramway until the mid-1990s
- Dickabram Bridge
- Grafton Bridge, Grafton, carries road on top level with North Coast railway line below
- Septimus, Queensland – Head-Menkens Road – Cane tram
- Bloomfield Coal Loop over New England Highway near Thornton
- Leonardi Di Palma road-rail bridge, Miallo, Queensland – Cane tram 610mm gauge
- John Luscombe Pioneer River bridge, sugar cane tramway 610mm gauge

=== Former ===
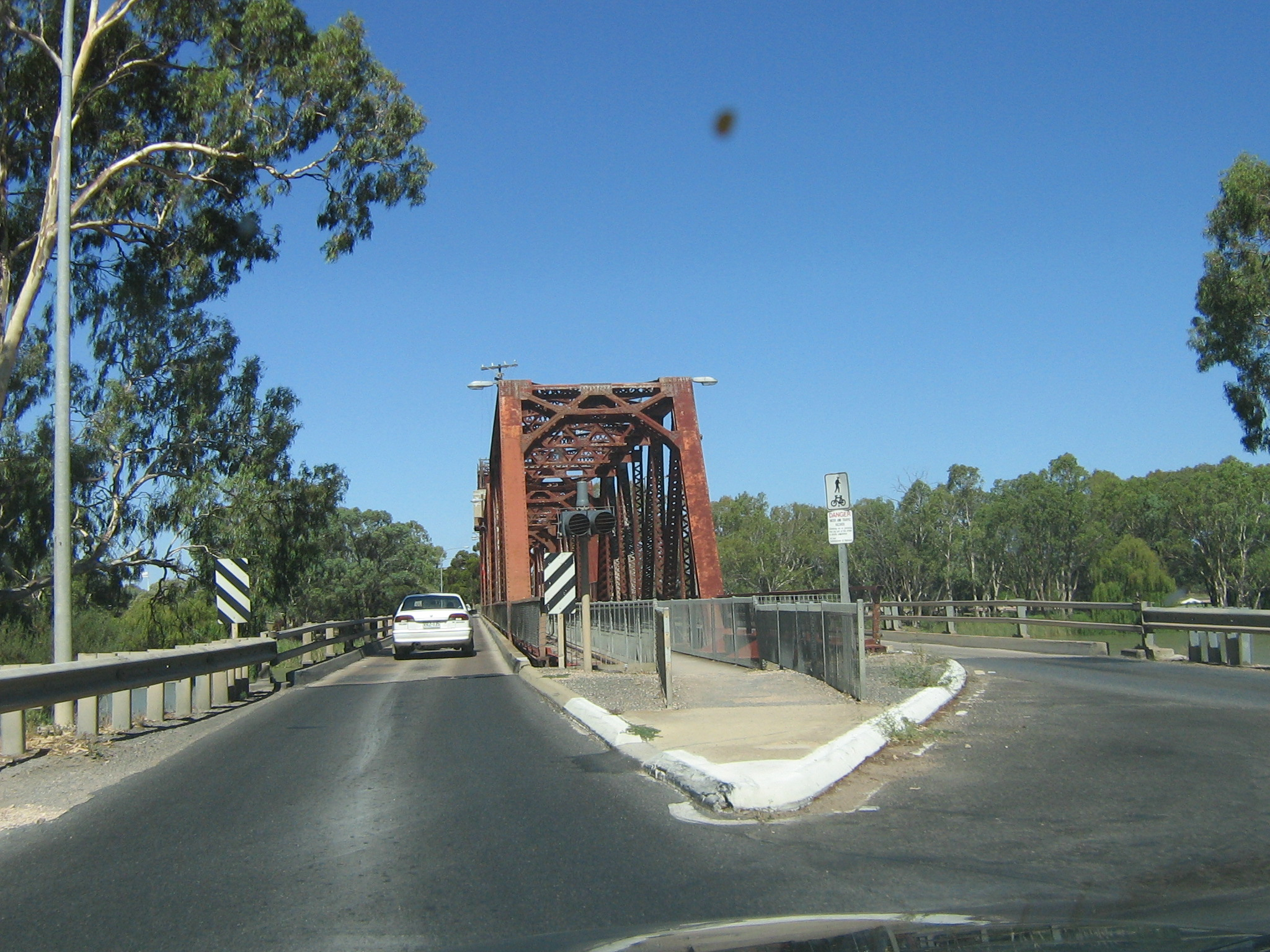
Paringa Bridge in Paringa, South Australia, with a bicycle path through the middle, on the former railway.

- Menindee – separated in the 1970s.
- Penrith – separated in 1907 by construction of separate railway bridge.
- Tocumwal – separated by construction of adjacent road-only bridge in 1987.
- Murray Bridge from the opening of the railway in 1886 until a separate rail bridge was opened in 1925.
- Paringa Bridge, from its opening in 1927 until the Barmera railway line closed in 1982. The railway area was converted to a cycleway in 1986. Originally one lane of traffic and the railway shared the area within the truss spans, but a single-lane deck was later attached to either outer side of the trusses to separate road and rail traffic.
- Echuca–Moama, opened in 1879, road only since adjacent rail-only bridge opened in 1989.
- Gonn Crossing, 1926, on the Stony Crossing railway line. Road only since the rail line closed in 1964.
- Robinvale, 1927, as part of the Robinvale railway line. Road only after construction of the line was abandoned in 1943. Replaced by a new road bridge in 2006.
- Camden Rail bridge attached to the road bridge until line closure in 1963.
- North Richmond, Rail bridge attached to the road bridge on the Kurrajong railway line until line closure in 1952.
- Bridgewater Bridge, Hobart, carried Midland Highway and South railway line

== Austria ==
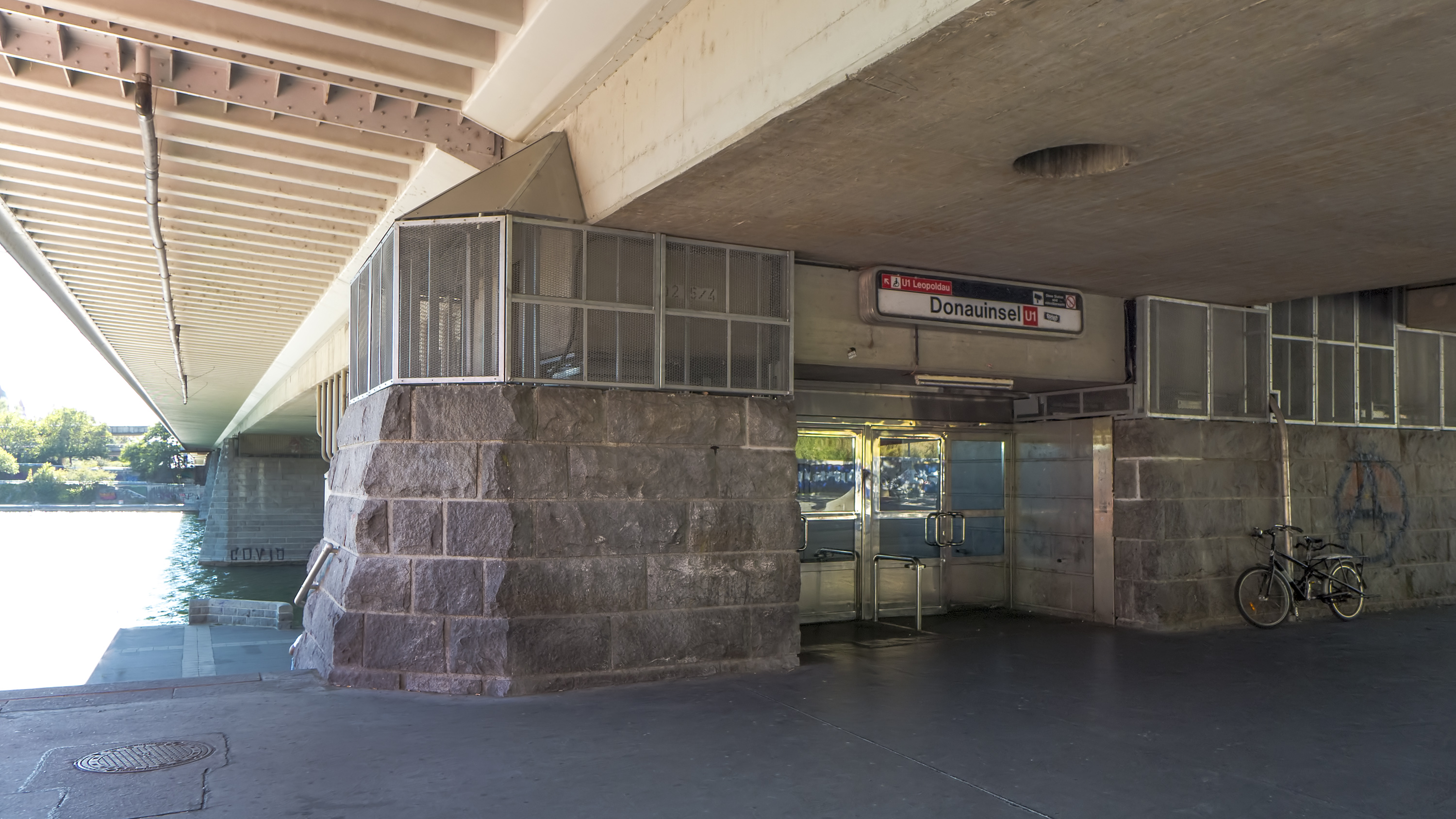
Donauinsel U-Bahn Station, under the Reichsbrücke in Vienna.

=== Current ===
- Floridsdorf Bridge
- Nibelungen Bridge (Linz)
- Reichsbrücke

=== Former ===
- Linz Railway Bridge (1900)

== Bangladesh ==
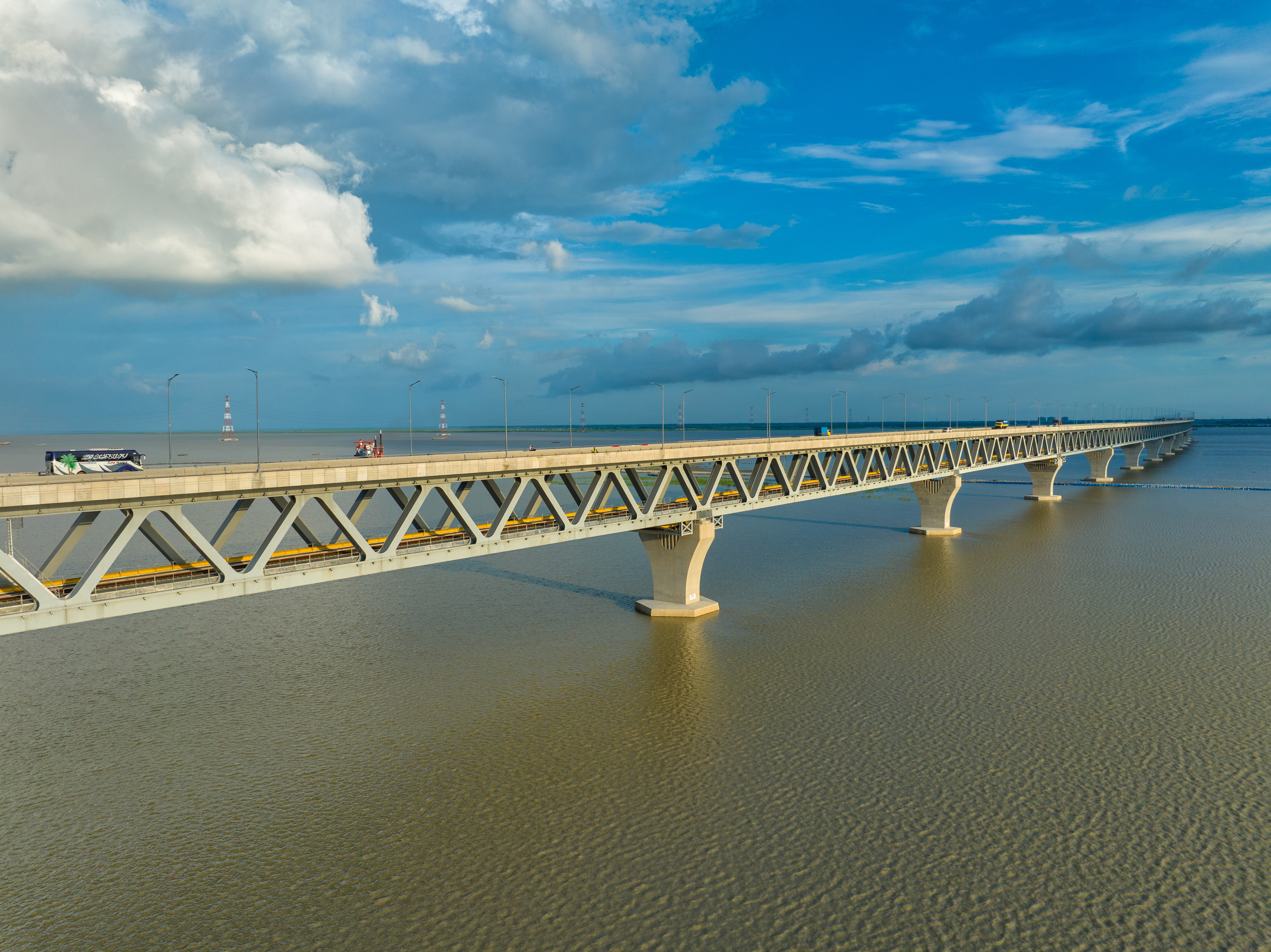
Padma Multipurpose Bridge (2023)

=== Current ===
- Kalurghat Bridge
- Padma Bridge

=== Former ===
- Jamuna Bridge

== Botswana ==
- Kazungula Bridge

== Brazil ==
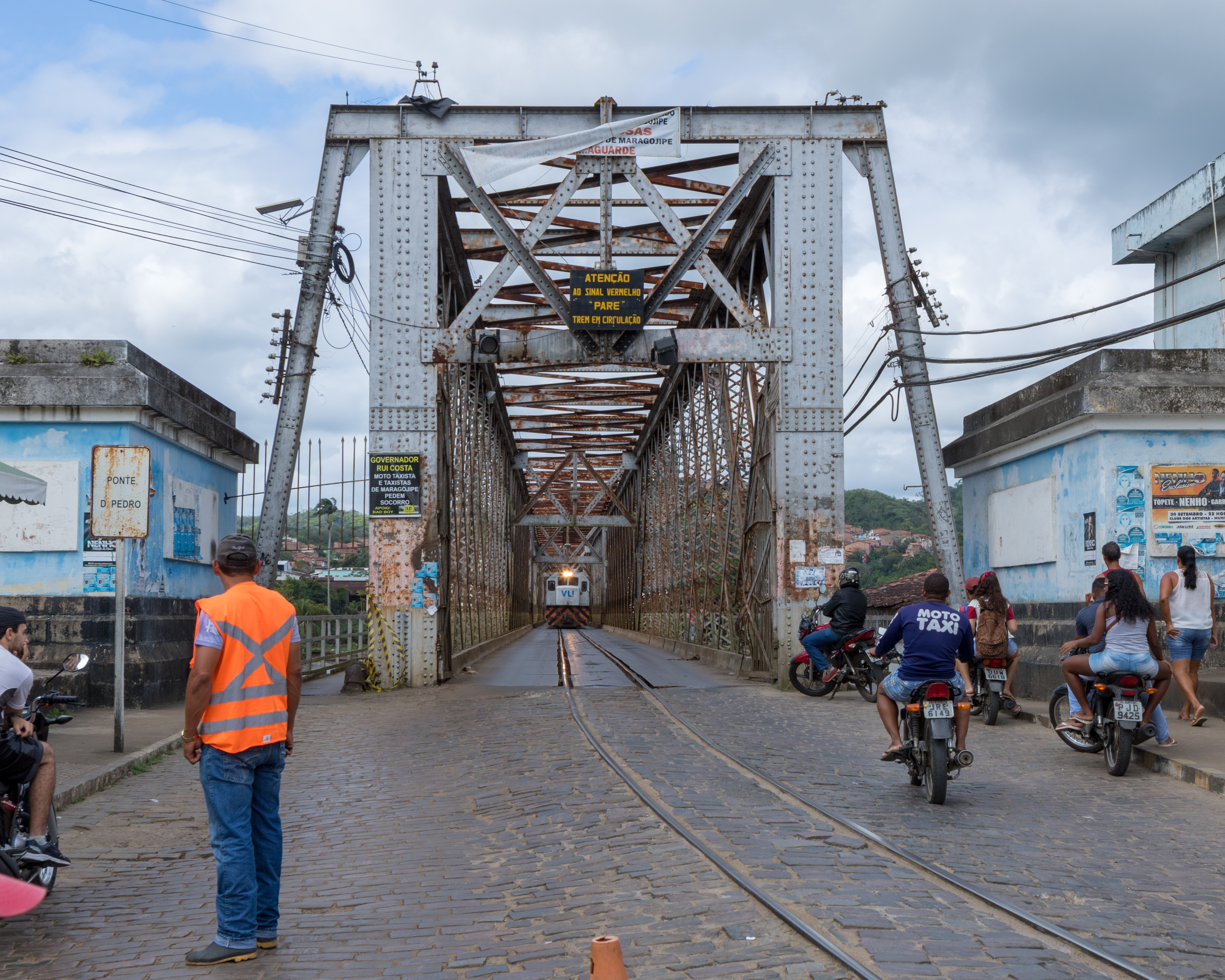
Dom Pedro II Bridge in São Félix, with an incoming train (2017).

=== Current ===
- Baron of Mauá International Bridge
- Brochado da Rocha Road-Rail Bridge
- Desengano Bridge
- Dom Pedro II Bridge
- Marcelino Ramos Road-Rail Bridge
- Paso de los Libres–Uruguaiana International Bridge
- Rollemberg–Vuolo Road-Rail Bridge
- Mixed Bridge of Marabá

=== Former ===
- Propriá–Colégio Road-Rail Bridge (Porto Real do Colégio – Propriá)

== Bulgaria ==
- Danube Bridge
- New Europe Bridge

== Cameroon ==
=== Current ===
- Wouri Bridge (2nd Bridge)

=== Former ===
- Wouri Bridge (1st Bridge)

== Canada ==
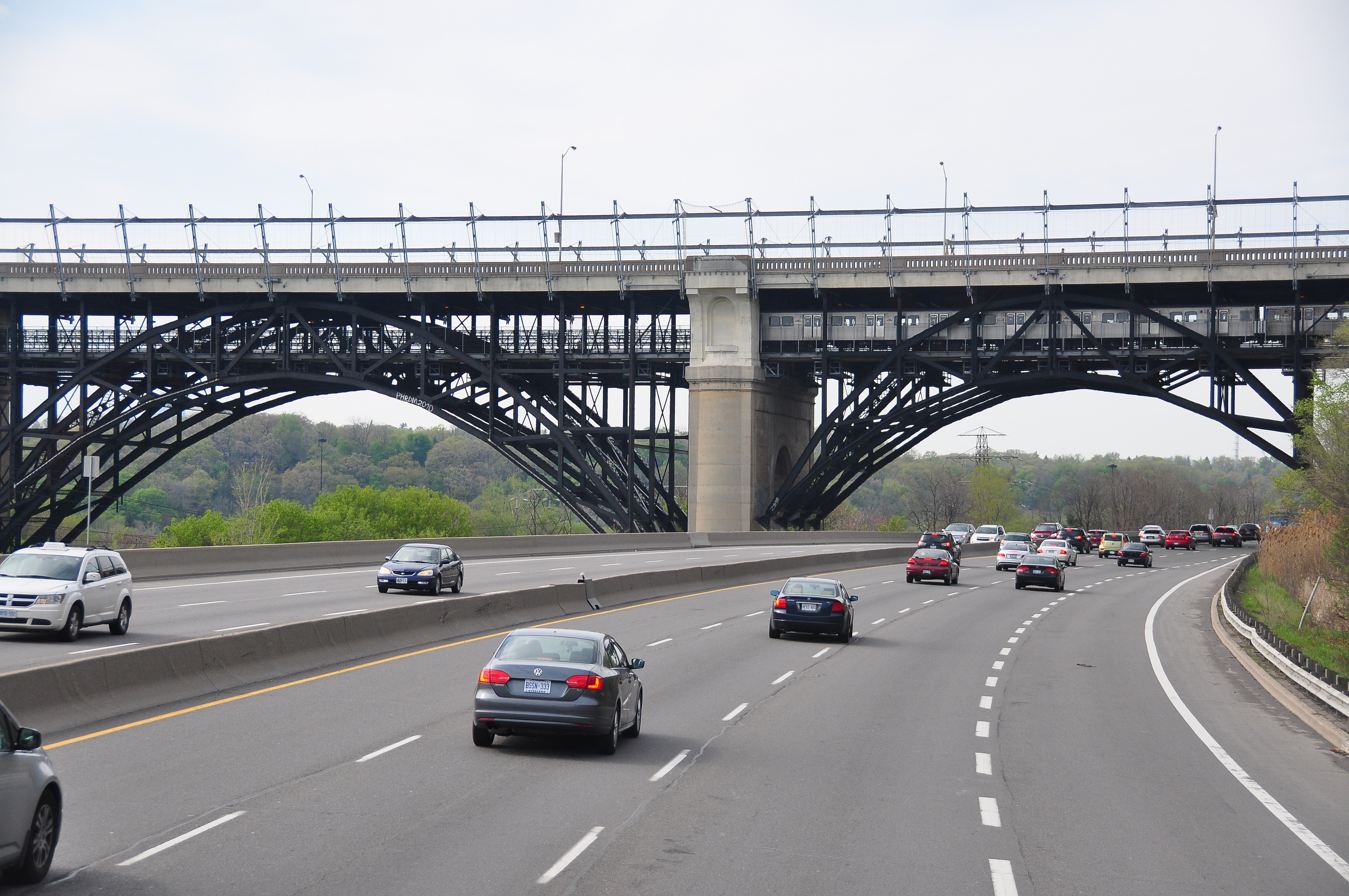
A Toronto subway train on the Prince Edward Viaduct.

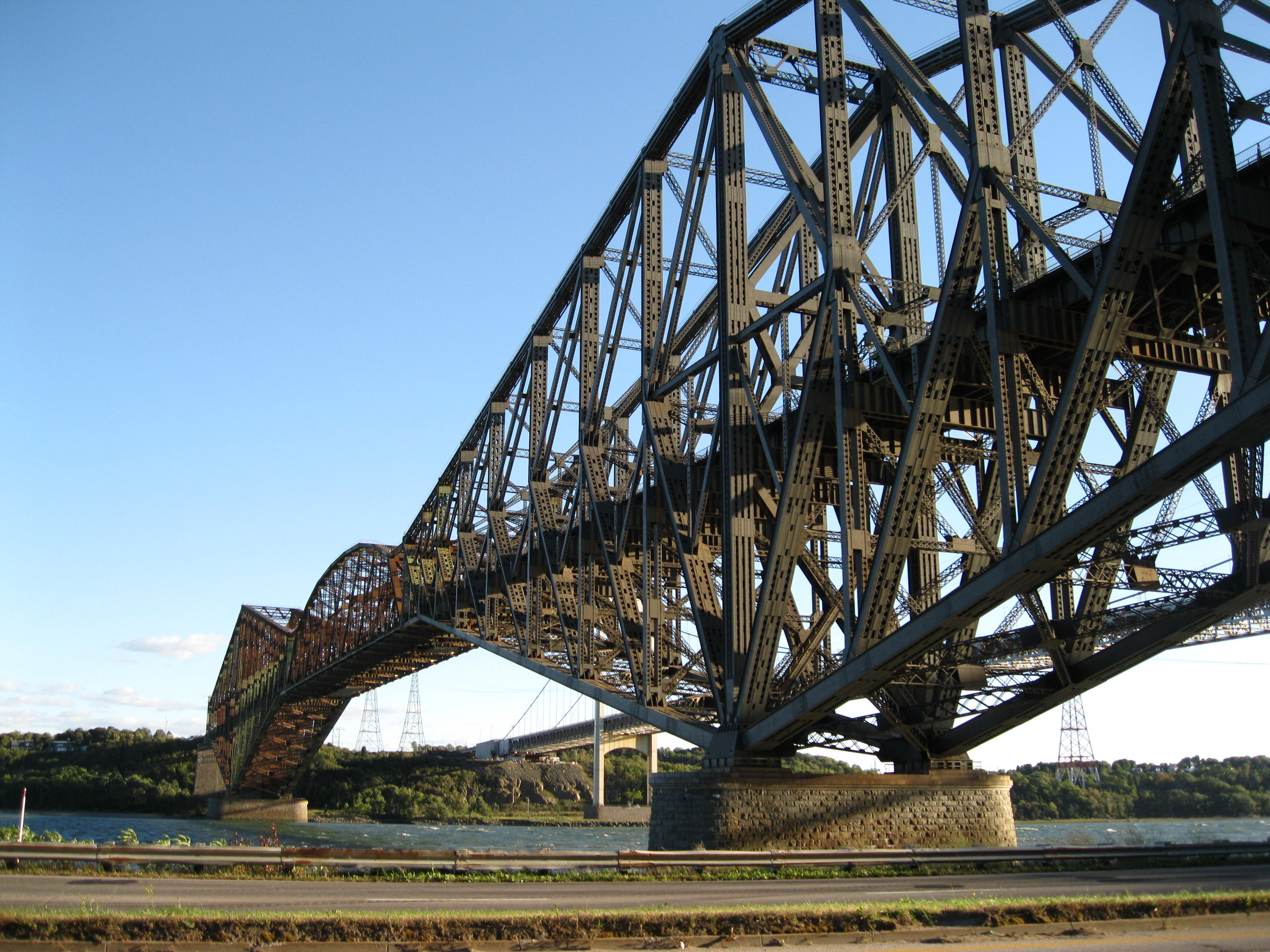
Quebec Bridge (2012)

Alberta

- High Level Bridge, Edmonton

British Columbia

- Derwent Way Bridge, Delta–New Westminster
- Mission Railway Bridge, Mission–Abbotsford; Rail only since the opening of the road only Mission Bridge.
- Prince George CNR Bridge, Prince George – from 1915 to 1987.
- Rail bridge over the Fort Nelson River, south of Fort Nelson.
- Second Narrows Rail Bridge, Vancouver – the original bridge in 1925.

Nova Scotia

- Canso Canal Bridge, Port Hastings

Ontario

- Alexandra Bridge, Ottawa, until the tracks were removed.
- Prince Edward Viaduct, Toronto, since 1966 when the subway was commissioned on the lower decks.
- Whirlpool Rapids Bridge, Niagara Falls, Ontario, carries passenger rail on the upper level, road on the lower level between Ontario and New York.

Québec

- Victoria Bridge, Montreal
- Quebec Bridge, Québec City
- Samuel-De Champlain Bridge, Montreal, with the Réseau express métropolitain.

Saskatchewan

- St. Louis Bridge – 1915 rail only; 1928 road-rail; 1983; road only.
- Canadian Northern Railway Bridge (Prince Albert) – 1909–1960 road-rail; 1960 rail only;
  - also a swing bridge, 1909–1939.
- Crooked Bridge – 1930.
- CPR Bridge (Saskatoon) – rail 1908; rail and pedestrian 1909.

== China (mainland) ==
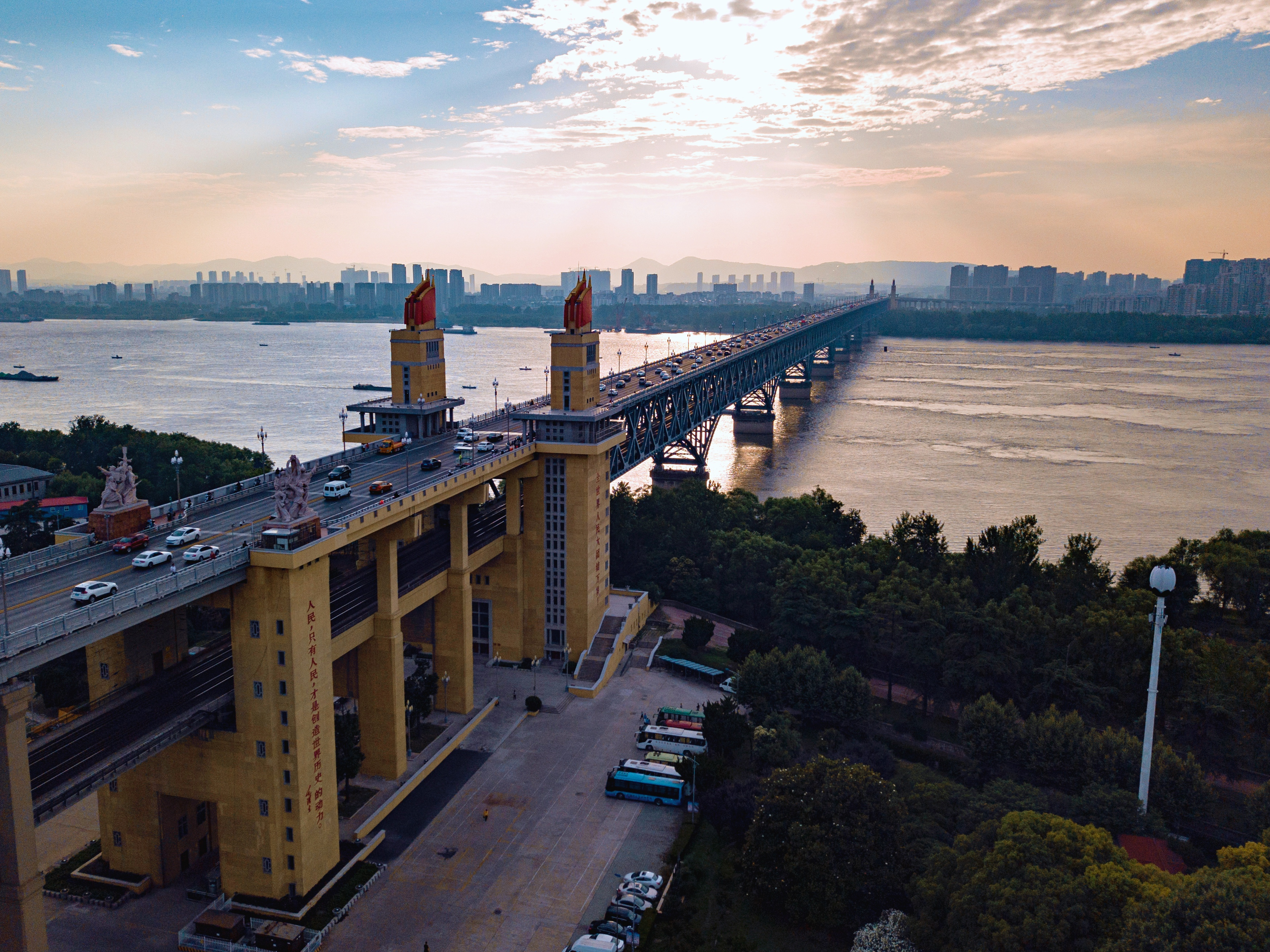
Nanjing Yangtze River Bridge

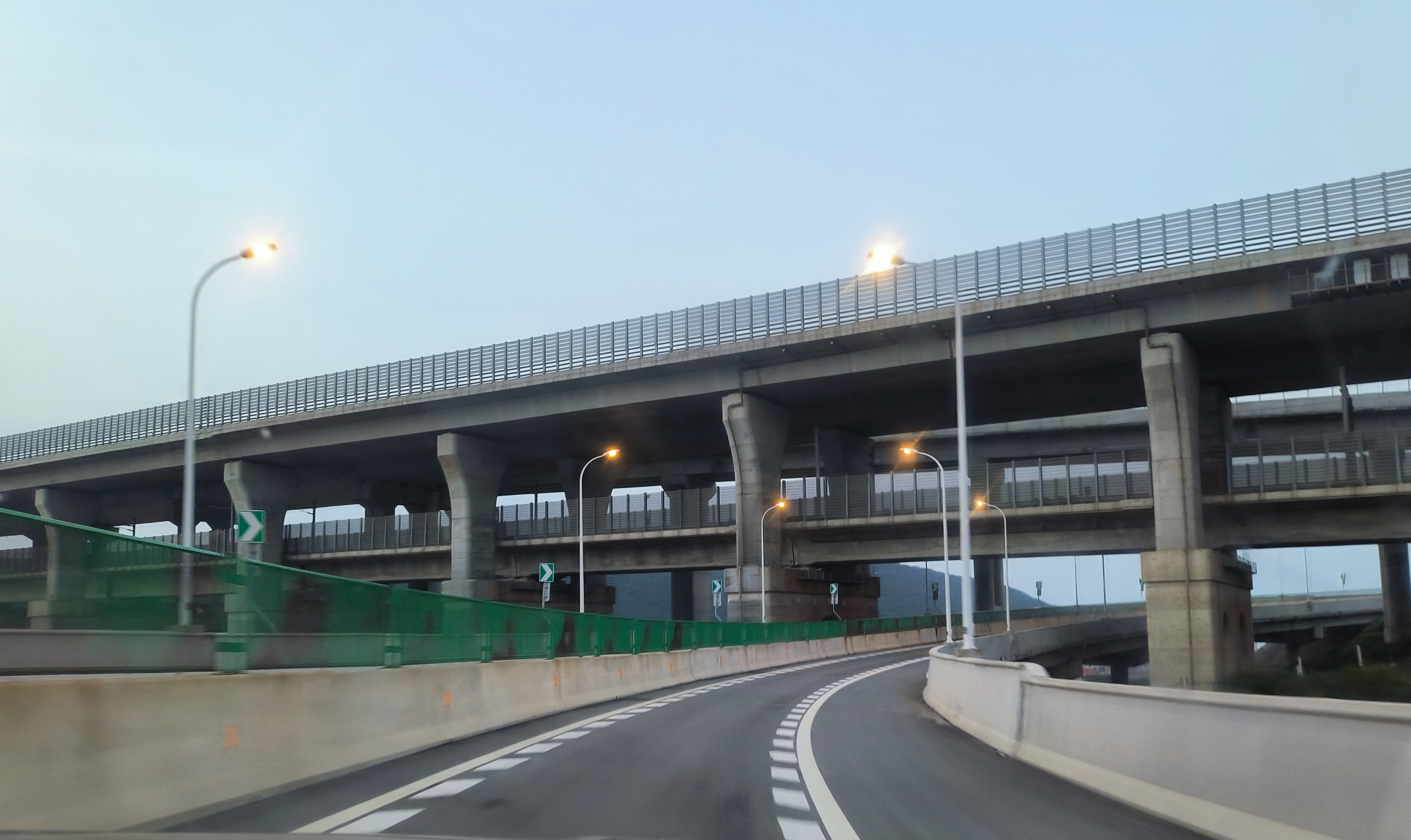
Pingtan Strait Road-Rail Bridge in Fuzhou, one of the longest road-rail sea crossings in the world.

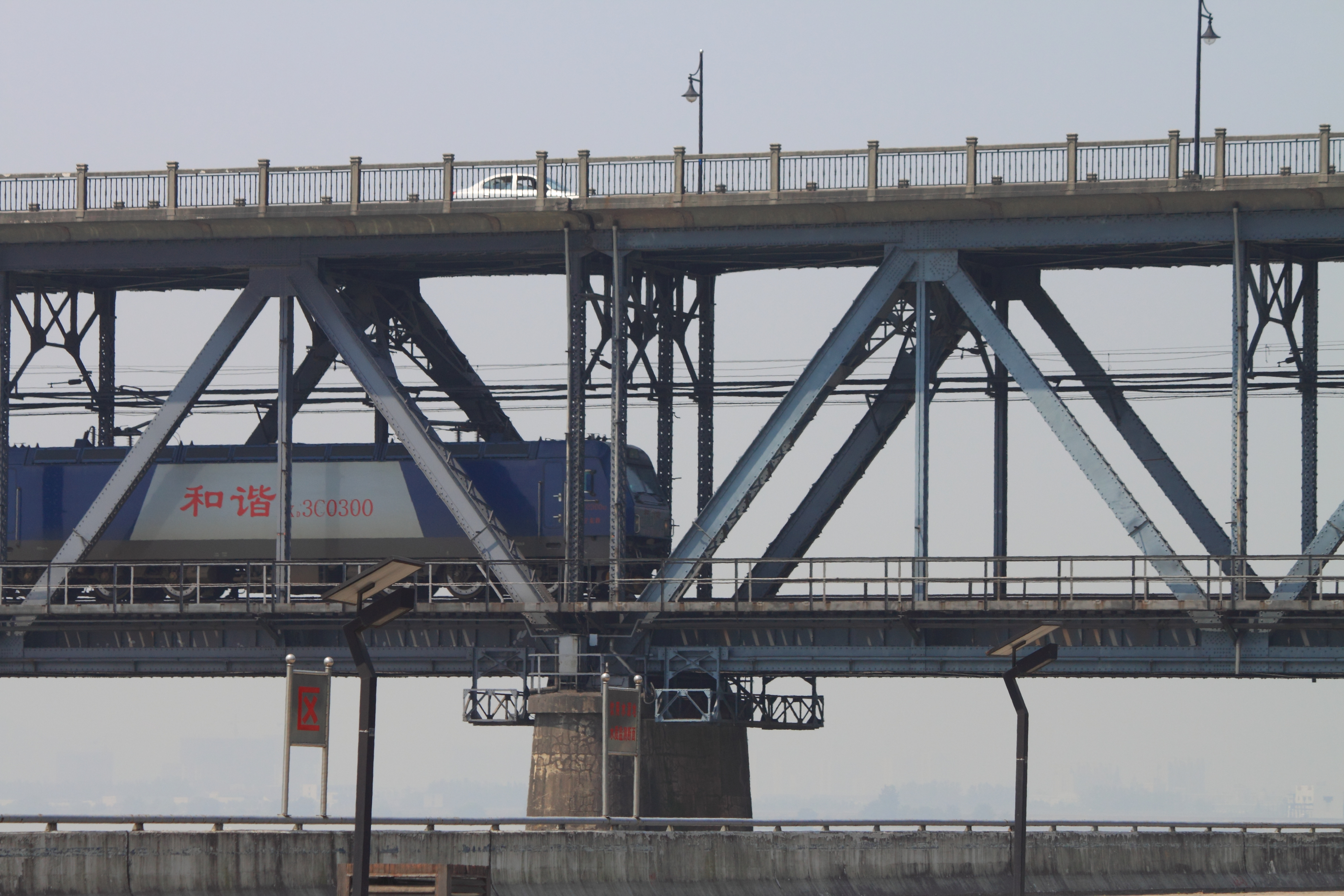
Qiantang River Bridge, with a car and a train visible (2012).

=== Current ===
Across the Yangtze (upstream to estuary)

- Yibin Jinsha River Road-Rail Bridge
- Yibin Lingang Yangtze River Bridge
- Dingshan Bridge
- Yudong Yangtze River Bridge
- Baijusi Yangtze River Bridge
- Caiyuanba Bridge
- Twin River Bridges (Chongqing)
- Chaotianmen Bridge
- Guojiatuo Yangtze River Bridge
- Zhicheng Yangtze River Bridge
- Jingzhou Yangtze River Road-Rail Bridge
- Wuhan Yangtze River Bridge
- Tianxingzhou Yangtze River Bridge
- Huanggang Yangtze River Bridge
- Jiujiang Yangtze River Bridge
- Tongling Yangtze River Road-Rail Bridge
- Wuhu Yangtze River Bridge III
- Wuhu Yangtze River Bridge
- Nanjing Yangtze River Bridge
- Wufengshan Yangtze River Bridge
- Husutong Yangtze River Bridge

Other bridges

- Daxie Bridge
- Dongjiang Bridge (6-lane highway and Harbin–Bei'an railway)
- Ganjiang Bridge (2-lane road and Beijing–Kowloon railway)
- Hengyang Xiang River Road-Rail Bridge (Guangdong Road, Daqing Road and Hunan–Guangxi railway)
- Jingyuan Yellow River Road-Rail Bridge (road and Honghui railway)
- Pearl River Bridge (Zhongshan Road, Guangzhan HSR and Guangzhou Metro Line 5)
- Pingtan Strait Road-Rail Bridge (G3 and Fuping railway)
- Qiansimen Bridge (4-lane highway and CRT Line 6)
- Qiantang River Bridge
- Qiantang River Bridge II (road and Hukun railway)
- Sino-Korean Friendship Bridge
- Wanghe Bridge
- Xinglin Bridge (6-lane highway and Fuzhou–Xiamen railway)
- Zhaoqing Xijiang Bridge (G324 and Guangzhou–Maoming railway)
- Zhengxin Yellow River Bridge (S227 and Jingguang HSR)

=== Former ===
- Binbei Bridge (was a part of G202 and Harbin–Bei'an railway, road closed in 2006, railway closed and replaced by another bridge in 2016)
- Songpu Bridge (railway abandoned and replaced by Jinshan Railway Huangpu River Bridge, still used by G320)

== Czech Republic ==
- Bechyně Bridge
- Nusle Bridge

== Democratic Republic of the Congo ==
- Kongolo Bridge
- Matadi Bridge

== Denmark ==
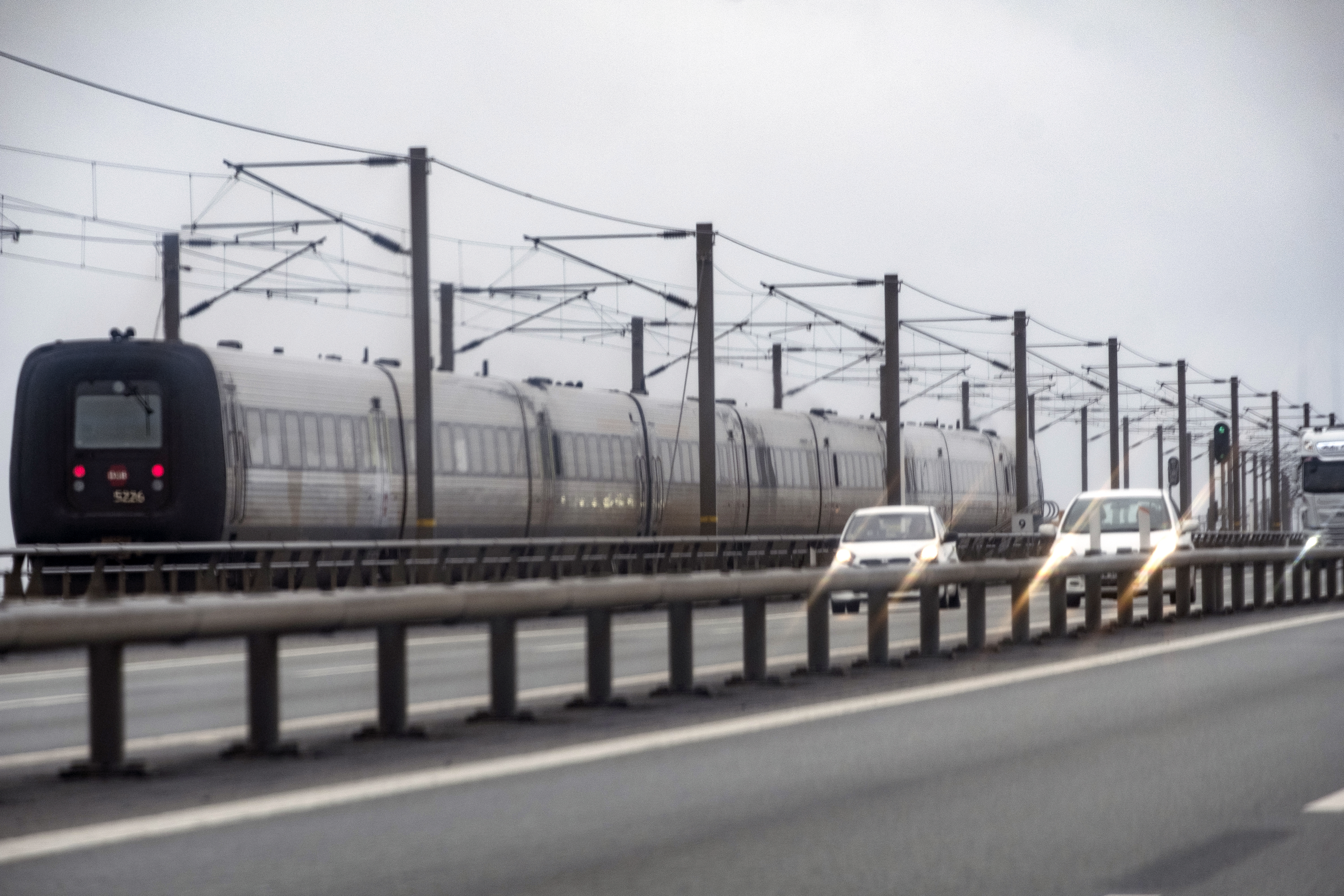
Road vehicles and a DSB train on the Great Belt Bridge.

=== Current ===
- Great Belt Bridge (West Bridge)
- King Frederik IX Bridge
- Little Belt Bridge
- Masnedsund Bridge
- Oddesund Bridge
- Storstrøm Bridge
- Øresund Bridge

=== Former ===
- Hadsund Bridge
- King Christian X's Bridge

== Egypt ==
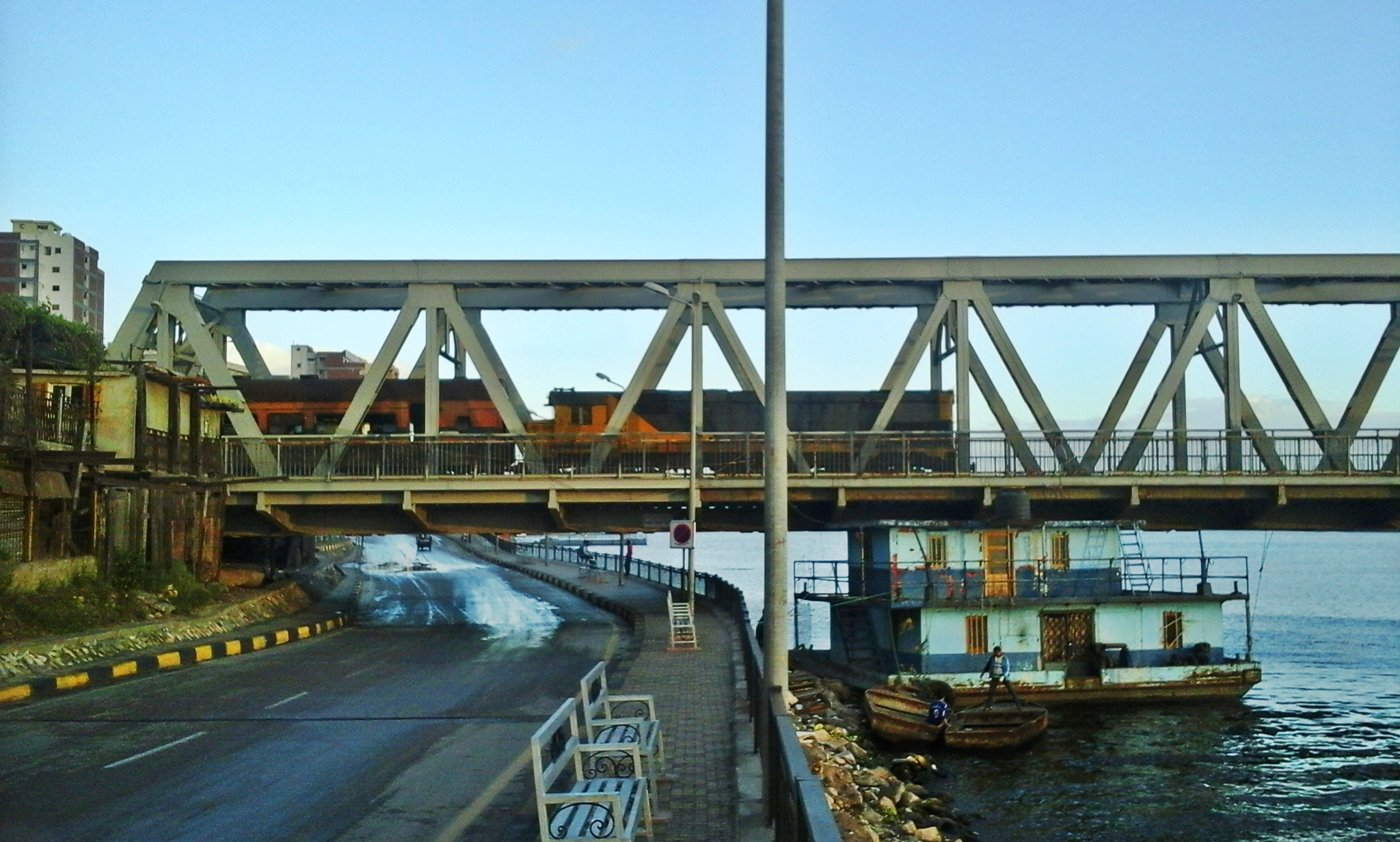
The Desouk Bridge across the Nile in Desouk, Kafr El Sheikh.

=== Current ===
- Desouk Bridge
- Imbaba Bridge
- The French Bridge

=== Former ===
- Rail bridge near Tell El Kebir's railway station

== Estonia ==
- Papiniidu Bridge

== Fiji ==
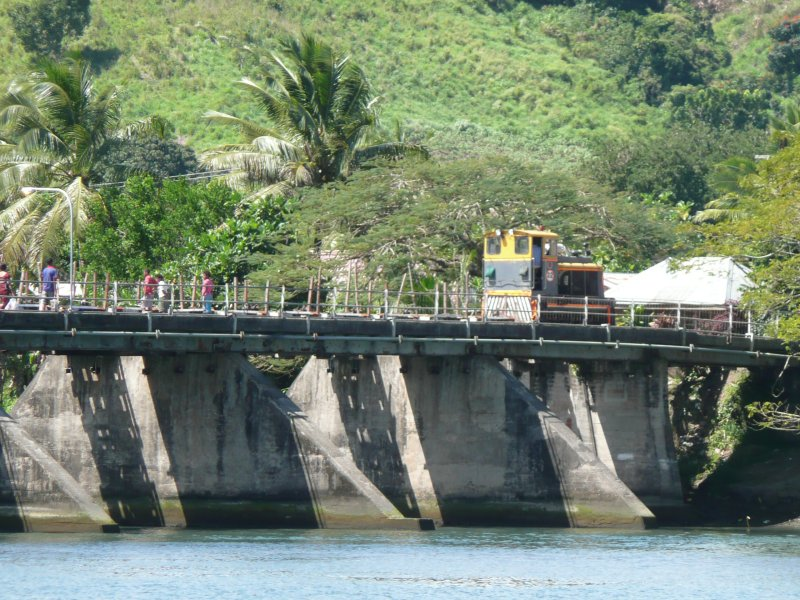
FSC Locomotive no. 22 crossing the Sigatoka Bridge (2008).

- On Viti Levu, the CSR Company was obliged to provide road-rail bridges when it built bridges for the Cane Trains to their sugar mills, e.g. the two largest bridges over the Ba and Sigatoka rivers. Many are now rail-only as separate road bridges has been built.
- The Ba Bridge (550 ft; 170 m) in Ba has 19 spans, 17 standard spans (30 ft; 9.1 m) and a short span at each end, and has been rail-only for many years. The Sigatoka Bridge (810 ft; 250 m) in Sigatoka has 27 spans. Both bridges are prone to hurricane damage due to extra flow of water; the Ba Bridge often disappears under water, but is not always damaged (see Cane Trains).
  - Sigatoka Bridge was washed away by storms, January 2009.
- Labasa River - Sugar cane tramway; 610 mm gauge; proposed.

== Finland ==
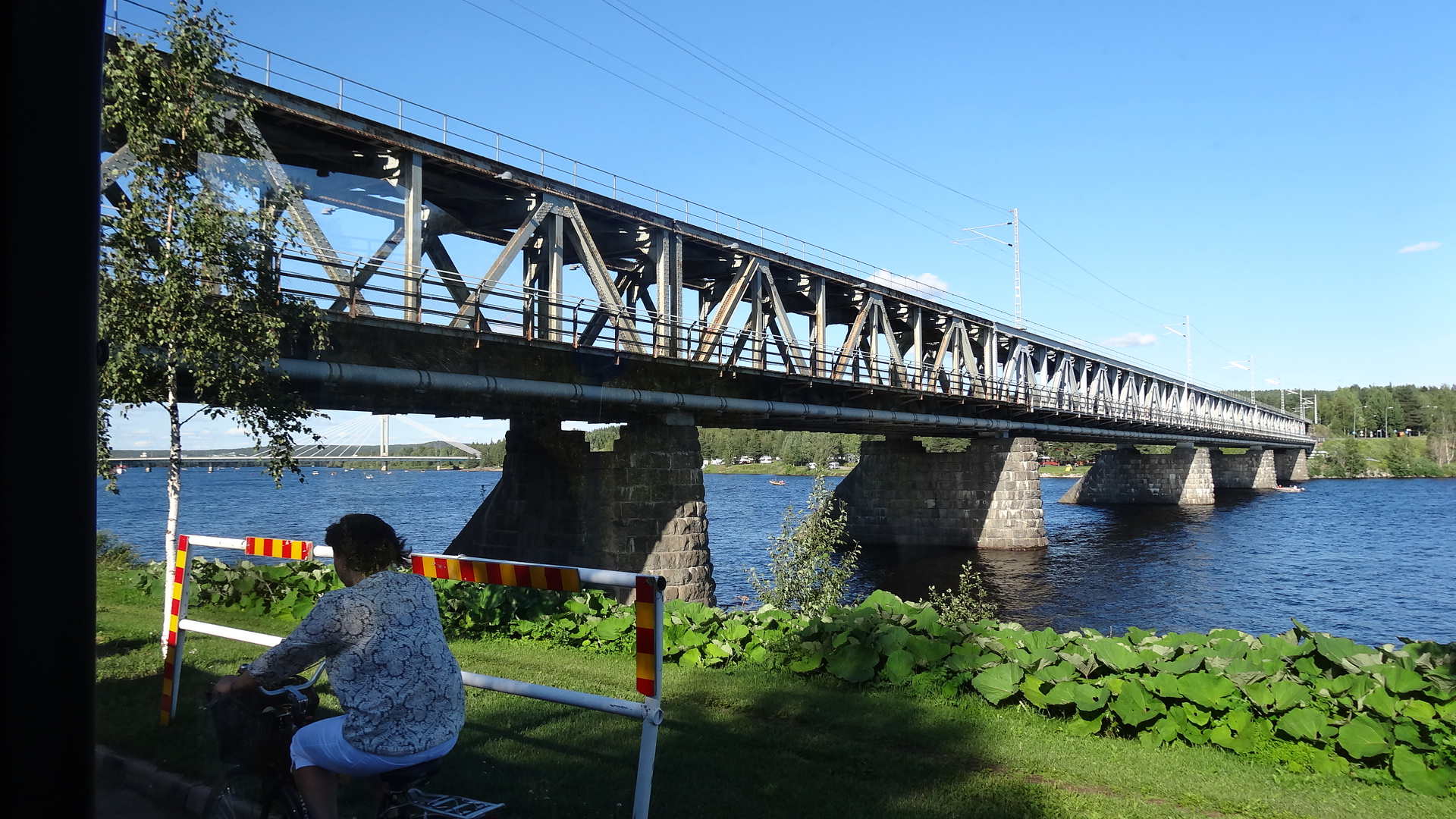
Ounaskoski Bridge in Rovaniemi, with a road on its lower deck and a railway on its upper deck.

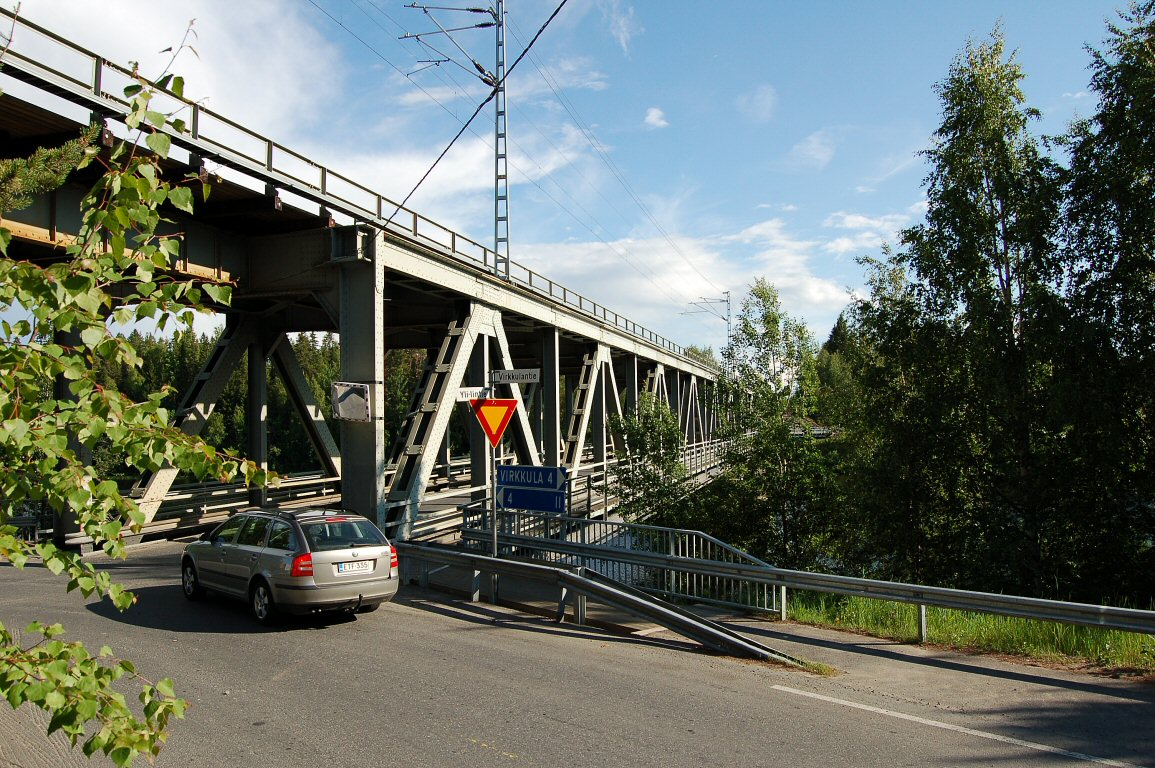
A car entering the lower deck of the Iijoki Railway Bridge.

=== Current ===
- Iijoki Railway Bridge
- Kirnukoski Railway Bridge – northeast of Ristijärvi, near Jokikylä.
- Ounaskoski Bridge
- Rail bridge at Isohaara Hydropower Plant, in Keminmaa.
- Rail bridge over Runkotie, in Seinäjoki.
- Bridges for light rail & trams:
  - Atlantinsilta
  - Crusellinsilta
  - Hämeentie Bridge (north)
  - Hämeentie Bridge (south)
  - Hämeensilta
  - Pasilansilta
  - Pitkäsilta

=== Former ===
- Aninkaistensilta – carried Turku trams (1932–1967).
- Kemijoki Bridges – destroyed during the Lapland War.
- Kulosaari Bridge (1919) – carried the Kulosaari tramway.
- Mansikkakoski Railway Bridge – restored for normal traffic, rail traffic moved to new bridge.

== France ==
- Beatus Rhenanus Bridge
- Cize–Bolozon viaduct, on the Ligne du Haut-Bugey. Built 1882, destroyed by the maquis in 1945, rebuilt 1950.
- Pont de Recouvrance, Brest – road & tramway – includes lifting span.
- Pont Morand, Lyon
- Viaduc de Salles at Giroussens, Tarn, on the Chemin de Fer Touristique du Tarn.

== Germany ==
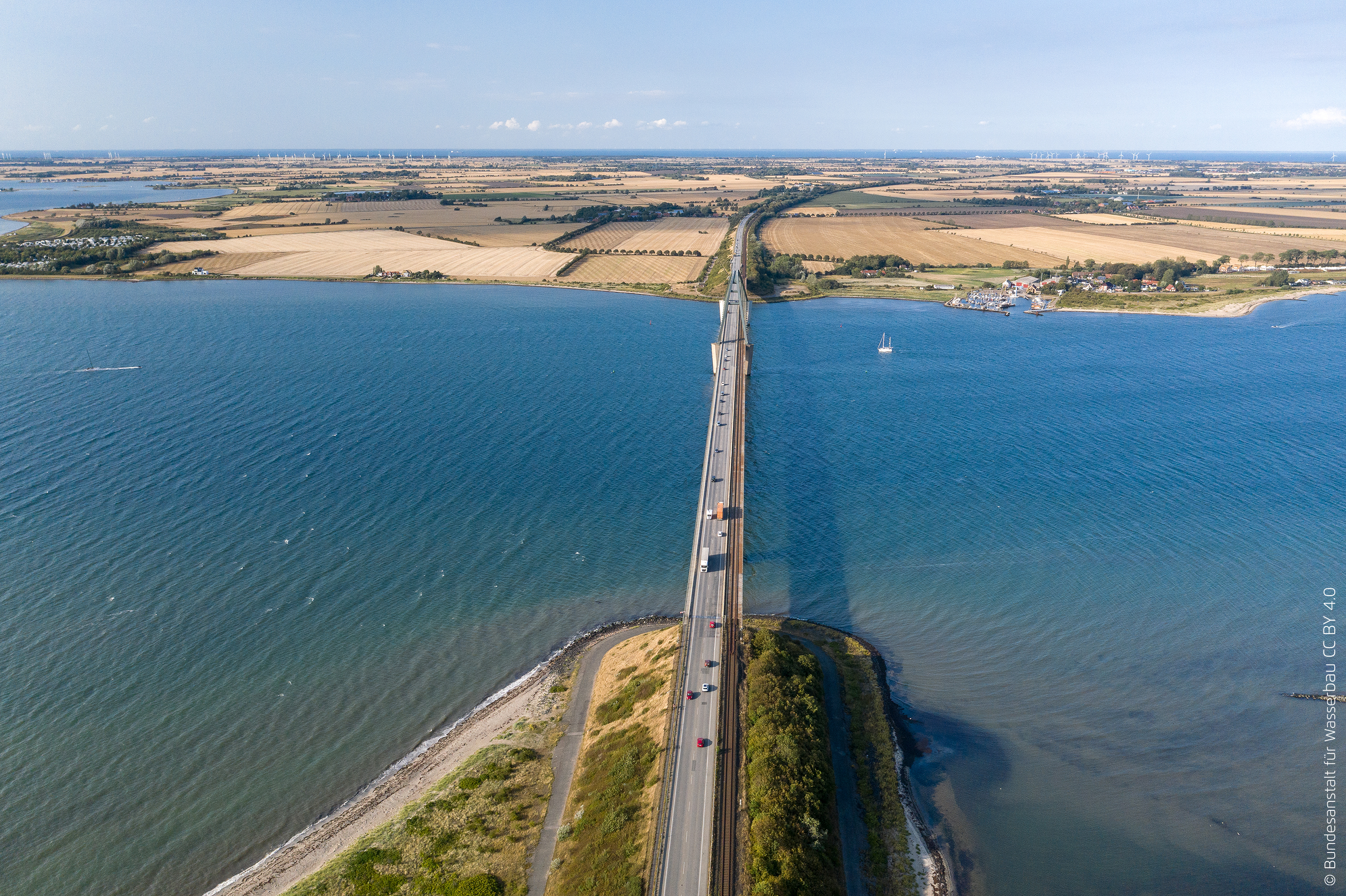
Fehmarn Sound Bridge (2020)

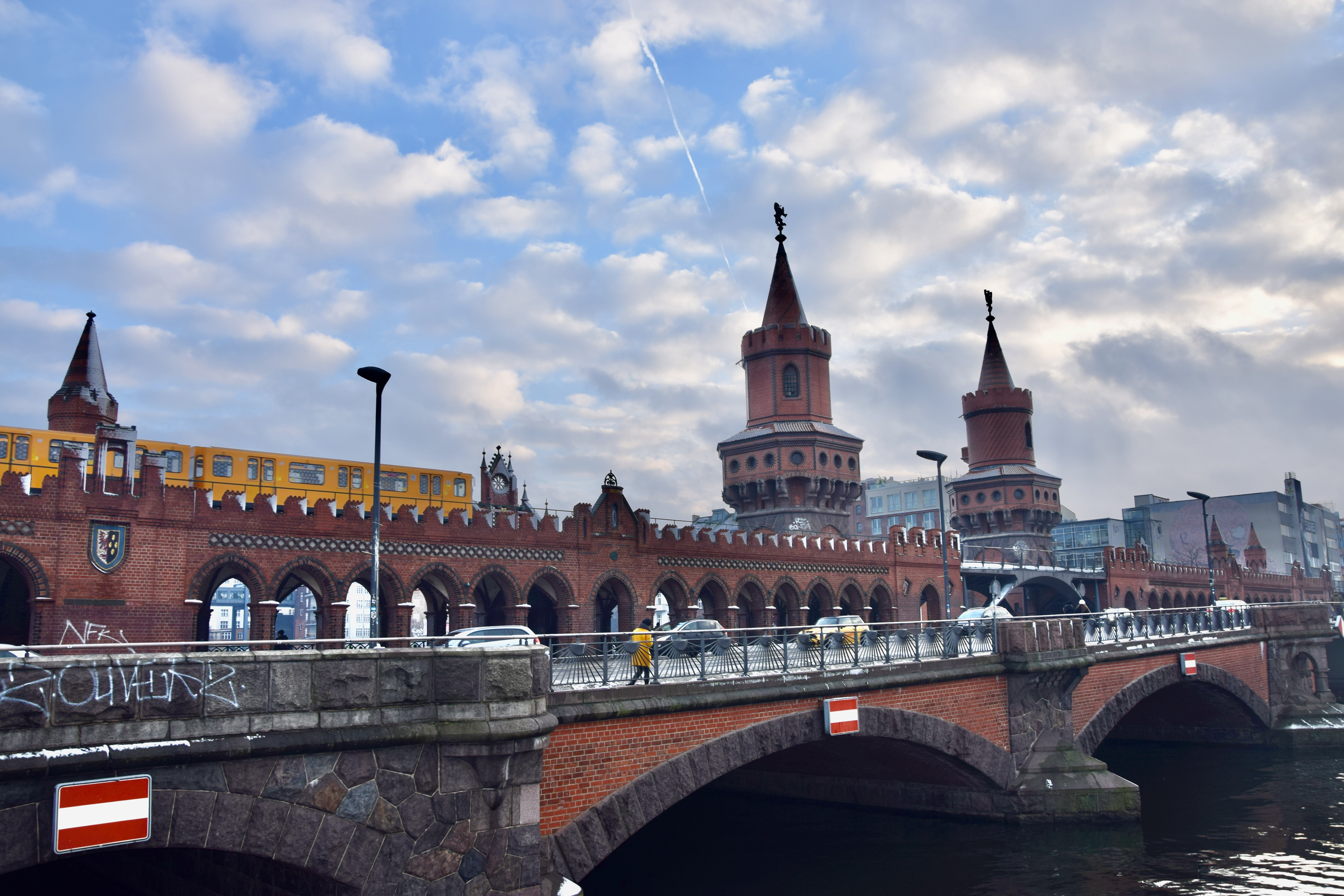
Oberbaum Bridge (2015)

=== Current ===
- Elbbrücke Lauenburg
- Fehmarn Sound Bridge
- Konrad Adenauer Bridge
- Lindaunis Bridge
- Moselbrücke Bullay
- Oberbaum Bridge
- Oberhafenbrücke
- Peenebrücke Wolgast
- Rügendamm
- Bridges for light rail & trams:
  - Marienbrücke

=== Former ===
- Kattwykbrücke (1973)
- Ludendorff Bridge – during wartime.
- Marienbrücke – heavy rail moved to nearby rail bridge in 1901.
- Nordschleusenbrücke

== Ghana ==
- Unknown location with YouTube movie

== Guatemala ==
- Puente Rodolfo Robles

== Hong Kong ==
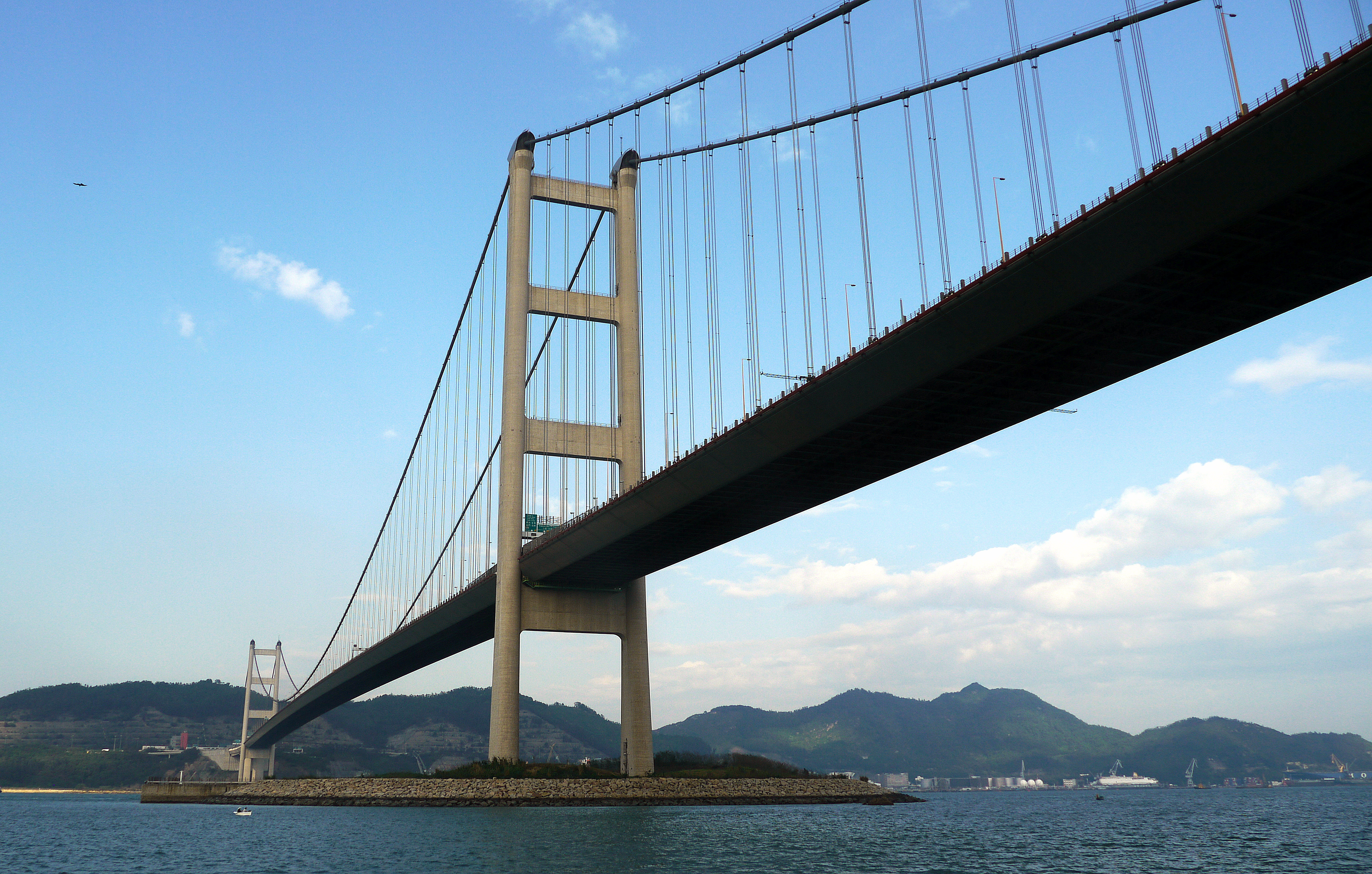
Tsing Ma Bridge (2012)

=== Current ===
- Lantau Link (east to west)
  - Tsing Ma Bridge (longest bridge span for road and rail traffic in the world)
  - Ma Wan Viaduct
  - Kap Shui Mun Bridge
- Hoi Wong Road, across the Tuen Mun River estuary.
- Kai Fuk Road Flyover/Kwun Tong line viaduct, between Ngau Tau Kok and Kowloon Bay stations.
- Kwun Tong Road over Tsui Ping Nullah
- Castle Peak Road—Hung Shui Kiu over Hung Shui Hang (Hung Shui Kiu River)
- Ma On Shan Road/Ma On Shan Rail (now part of Tuen Ma line) over Tai Shui Hang/Nui Po Tung Hang
- Tsing Kwai Highway, Tung Chung line and Airport Express (road and four tracks of rapid transit) – two stretches.
- Yuen Long Main Road over Yuen Long Creek (Yuen Long Nullah)

=== Former ===
- Bowrington Bridge, part of Hennessy Road across Bowrington Canal.
- Sha Tau Kok Railway and Sha Tau Kok Road – bridges over Ma Wat River, Tan Shan River and Kwan Tei River.
- Pui To Road

== Hungary ==
- Kiskörei Tisza Bridge
- Türr István Bridge

== India ==
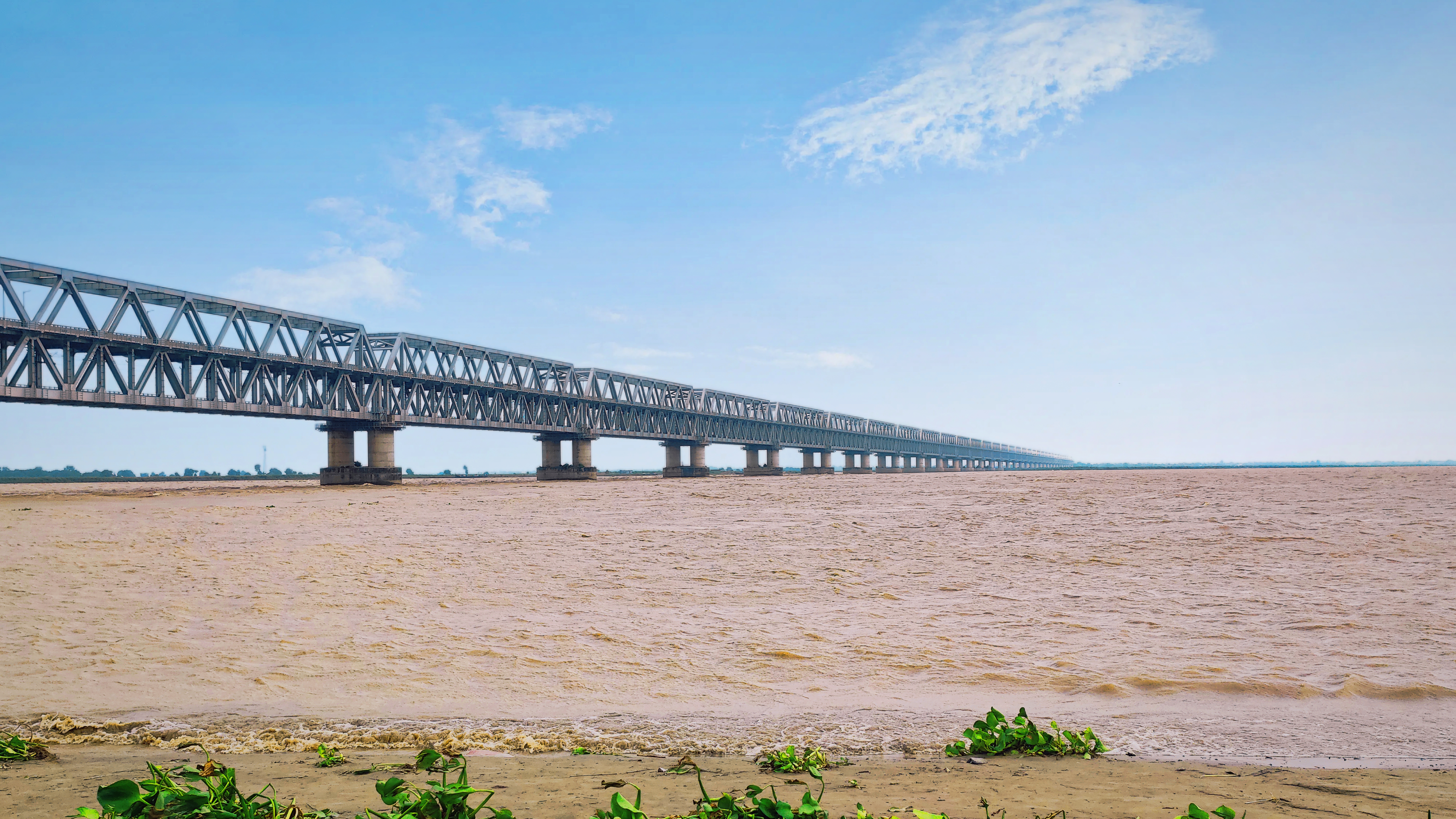
The Digha–Sonpur Bridge (JP Setu) over the Ganges, connecting the cities of Patna and Sonpur.

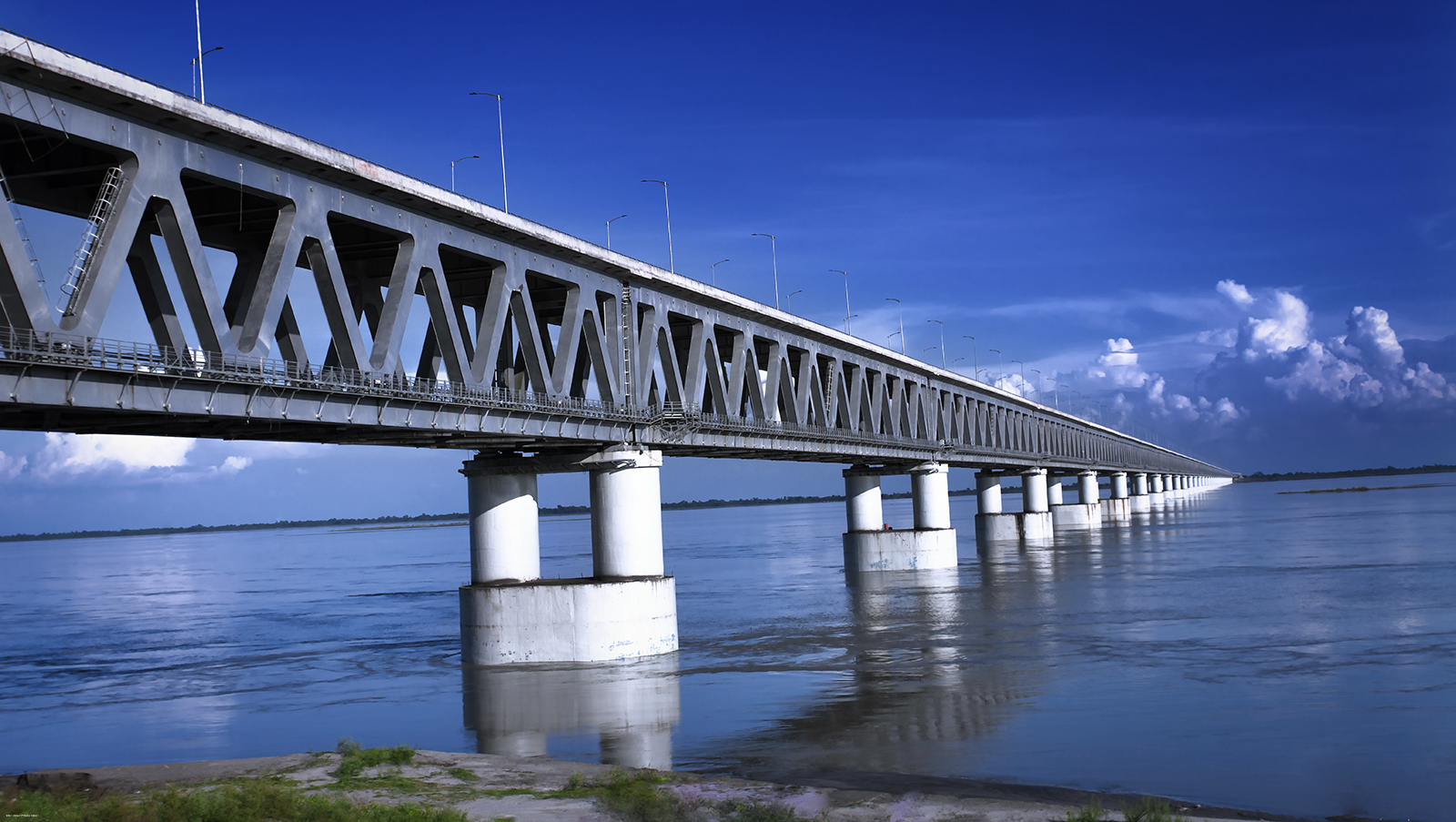
Bogibeel Bridge, with a 3-lane road highway on its upper deck & a double broad-gauge rail line on its lower deck.

Andhra Pradesh

- Godavari Bridge

Assam

- Bogibeel Bridge
- Naranarayan Setu
- Saraighat Bridge

Bihar

- Digha–Sonpur Bridge
- Koilwar Bridge
- Munger Ganga Bridge
- Rajendra Setu

Delhi

- Old Yamuna Bridge

Uttar Pradesh

- Lord Curzon Bridge (formerly)
- Malviya Bridge
- Old Naini Bridge
- Strachey Bridge, Agra

West Bengal

- Farakka Barrage
- Nashipur Rail Bridge
- Vivekananda Setu

== Indonesia ==
- Cirahong Bridge
- Cisomang Bridge (Gen.3)

== Iraq ==
- River Tigris in Baghdad – 1950

== Italy ==
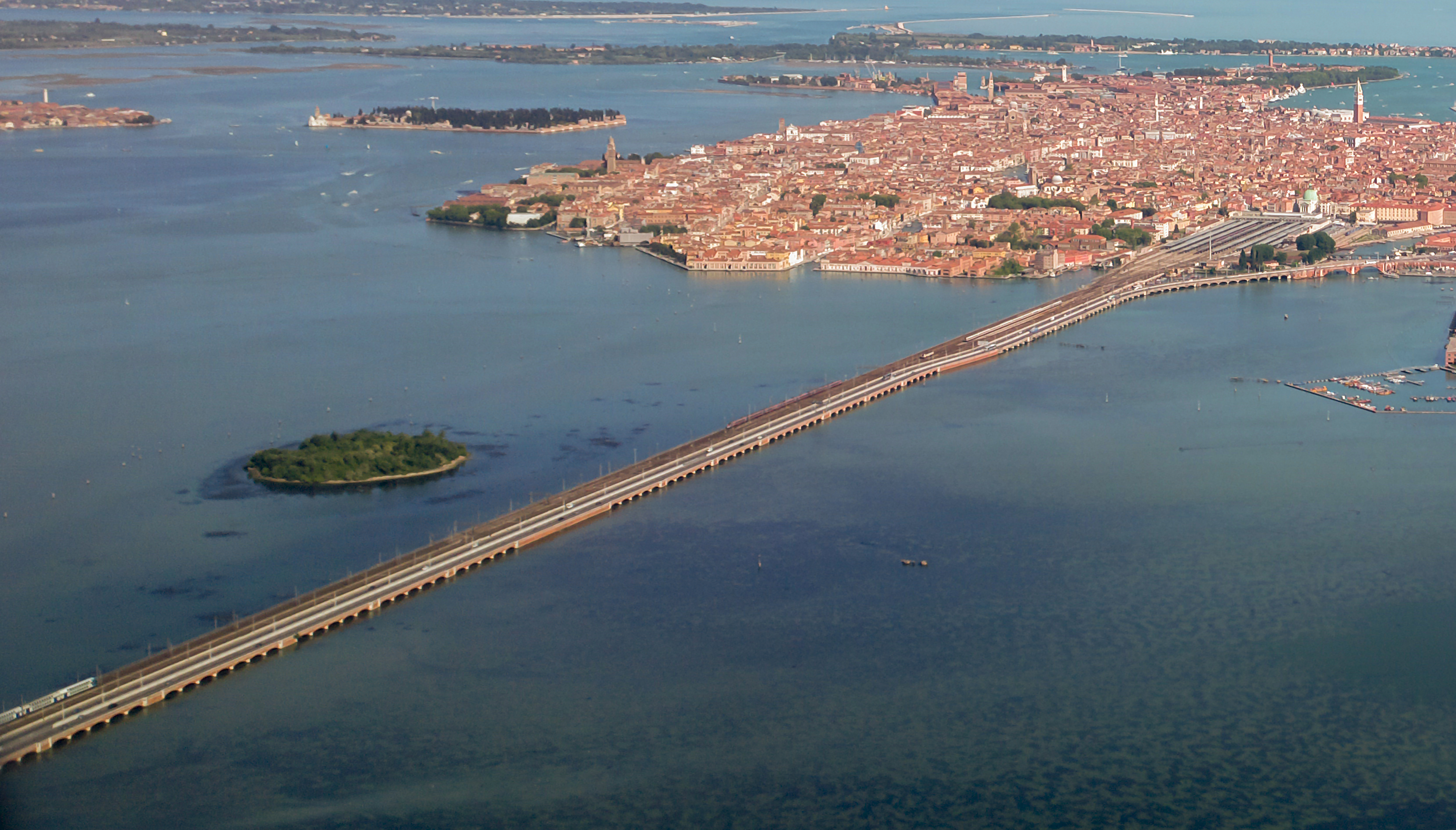
Ponte della Libertà (2015)

=== Current ===
- Mezzanacorti bridge over the Po on the Milan–Genoa railway
- San Michele Bridge over the Adda on the Seregno–Bergamo railway
- Sesto Calende bridge over the Ticino on the Domodossola–Milan railway
- Soleri viaduct in Cuneo
- Turbigo bridge over the Ticino on the Saronno–Novara railway
- Valenza bridge over the Po on the Pavia–Alessandria railway
- Ponte della Libertà in Venice
- Vigevano bridge over the Ticino on the Milan–Mortara railway

=== Former ===
- Adenige bridge on temporary Mont Cenis Railway
- Magenta bridge over the Ticino on the Turin–Milan railway
- Revere bridge over the Po on the Verona–Bologna railway
- San Nicolò bridge over the Trebbia on the Alessandria–Piacenza railway

== Ivory Coast ==
- Houphouët-Boigny Bridge

== Japan ==
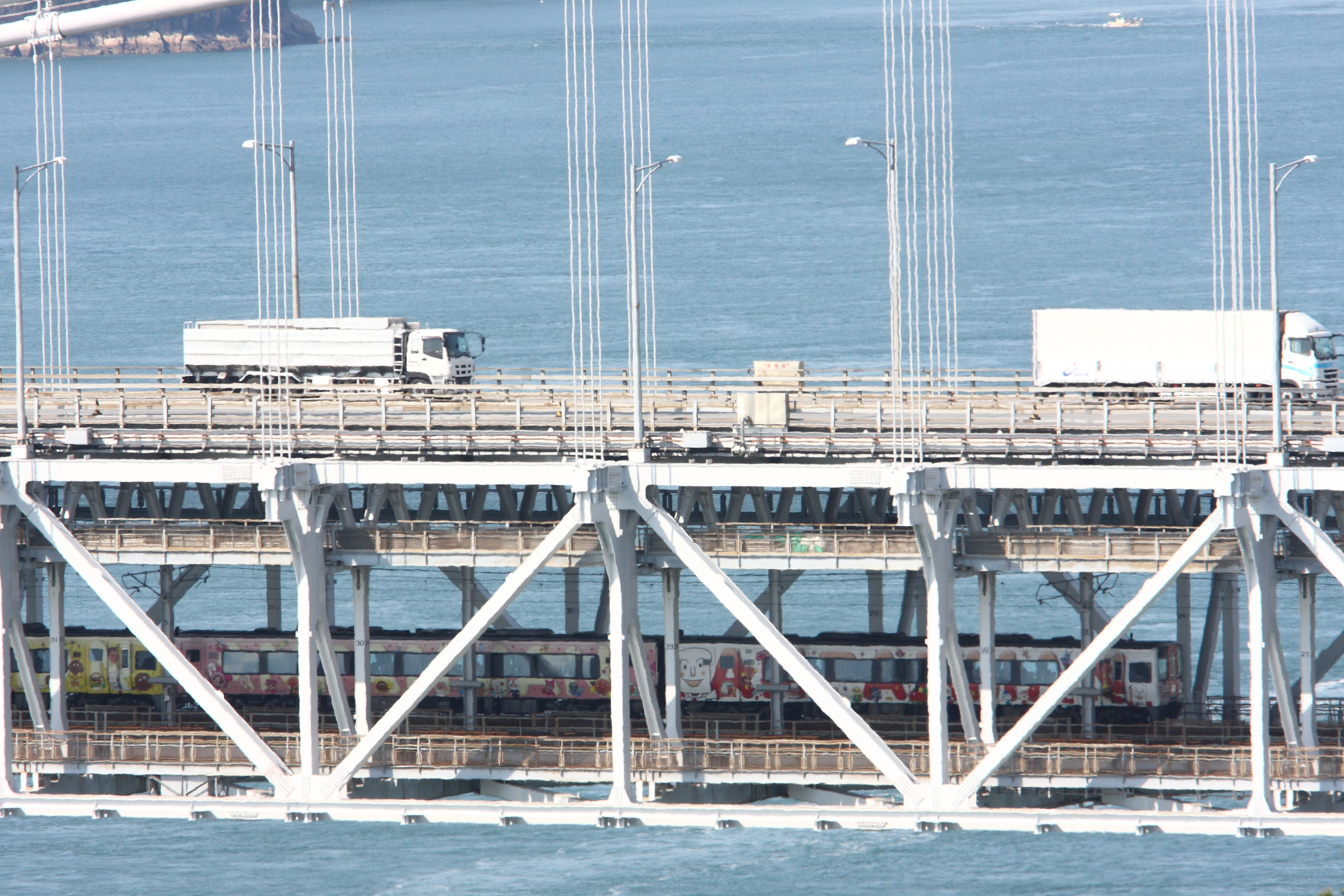
Road & rail traffic on the Shimotsui-Seto Bridge (Great Seto Bridge).

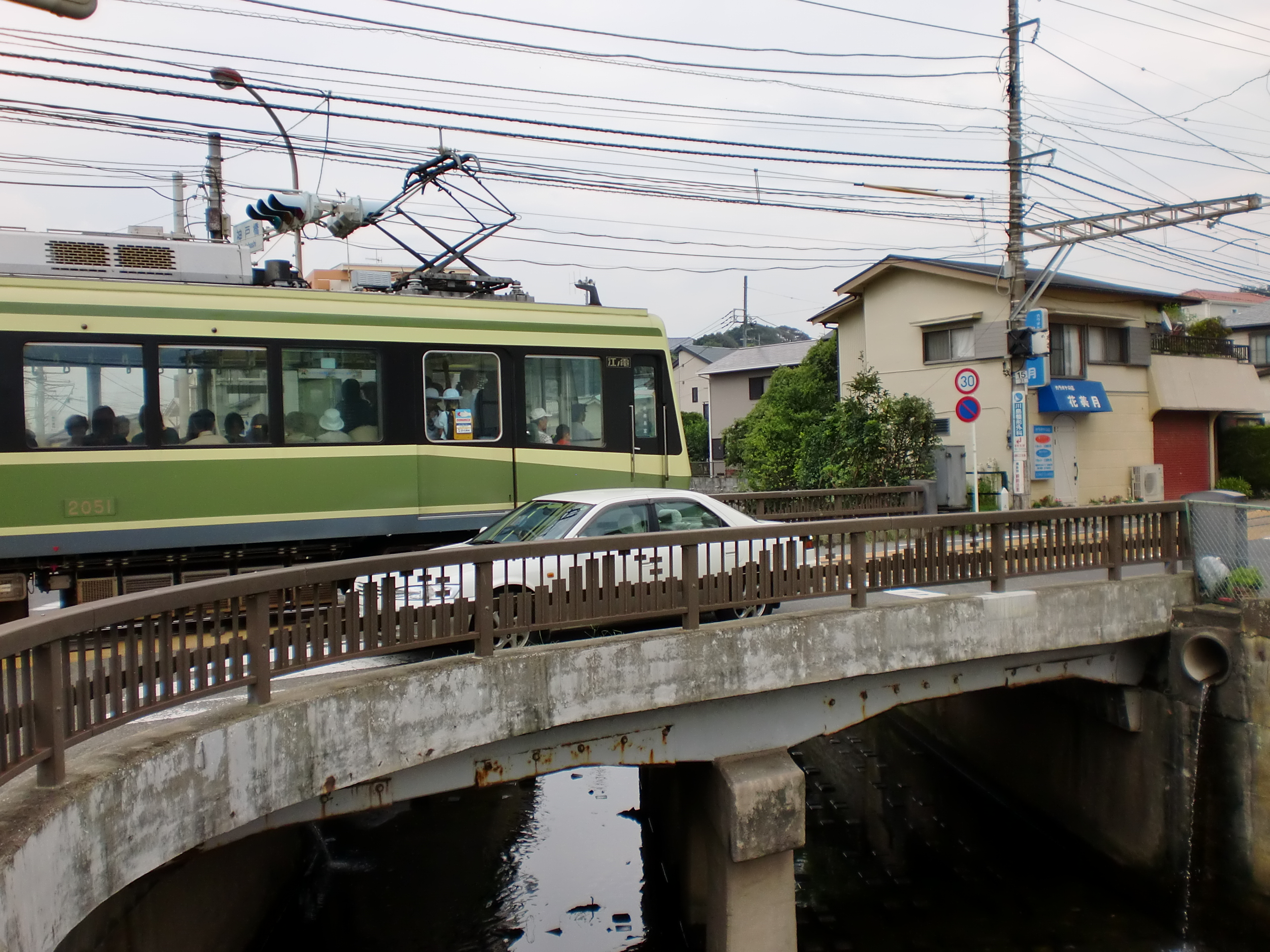
A car and an Enoden train on the Goudo-bashi Bridge in Koshigoe, Kamakura (2012).

=== Current ===
- Goudo-bashi Bridge – near Koshigoe Station (rare example of a bridge with street running trains in Japan).
- Great Seto Bridge – Seto-Chūō Expressway and JR Honshi–Bisan Line.
- Kansai International Airport Access Bridge (Sky Gate Bridge R) – 6-lane expressway, JR West and Nankai Railway.
- Kobe Sky Bridge – between Kobe Airport and Port Island, carrying the Port Liner.
- Murayama Bridge – National Route 406 and Nagano Electric Railway.
- Rainbow Bridge – Shuto Expressway Daiba Route (Route 11) and Yurikamome.
- Rokko Bridge – 4-lane road and Rokkō Island Line.
- Shin-Kuzuryu Bridge – Fukui Prefectural Route 268 and Hokuriku Shinkansen.
- Shin-Yodogawa Bridge – National Route 423 and Osaka Metro Midōsuji Line.
- Tatsunokuchi Bridge – 2-lane road and Sendai Subway Tōzai Line.
- Tatsupi Bridge – Tokyo Prefectural Route 149 and Tama Toshi Monorail Line.

=== Former ===
- Azumba Bridge – Azumabashi Line closed in 1972.
- Inuyama Bridge – separated in 2000.
- Umaya Bridge – Umayabashi Line closed in 1971.
- Yodogawa Bridge – road decommissioned in 2013.

== Laos ==
- First Thai–Lao Friendship Bridge

== Macau ==
- Sai Van Bridge

== Mexico ==
- Puente Rodolfo Robles

== Montenegro ==
- Rail bridge over Lake Skadar – M-2 highway & Belgrade–Bar railway.
- Rail bridge over the Morača – northeast of Vranjina.

== Mozambique ==
- Dona Ana Bridge, carried road and rail traffic, but not at the same time.

== Myanmar ==
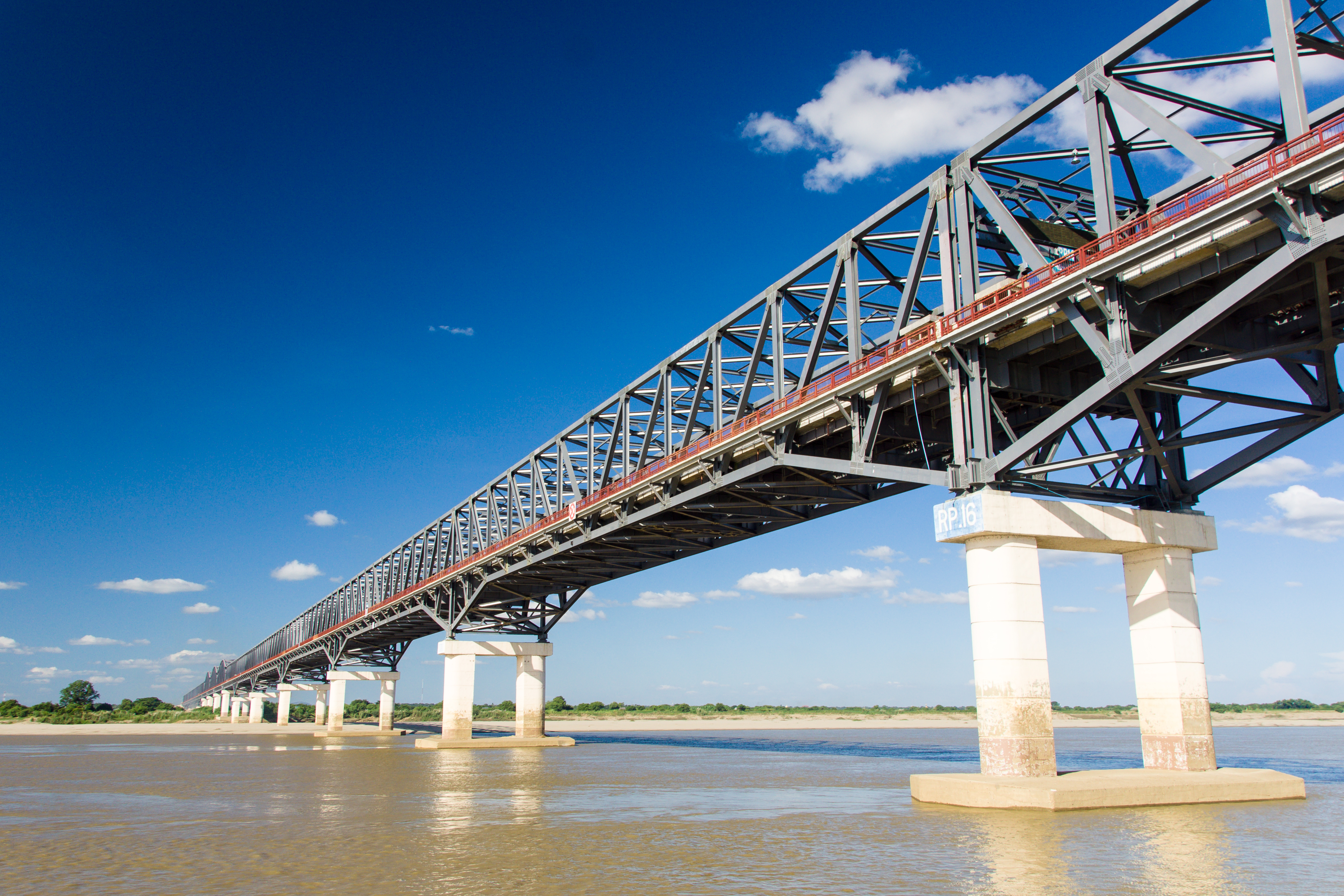
Pakokku Bridge over the Irrawaddy, one of the longest bridges in Myanmar.

=== Current ===
- Irrawaddy Bridge (Malun)
- Irrawaddy Bridge (Nyaungdon)
- Mu River Bridge
- Pakokku Bridge
- Sin Phyu Shin Bridge
- Sittaung Bridge (Theinzayat)
- Thanlwin Bridge (Mawlamyine)
- Thanlyin Bridge
- Ye–Chaung Taung Bridge (Ye)

=== Former ===
- Ava Bridge

== Netherlands ==
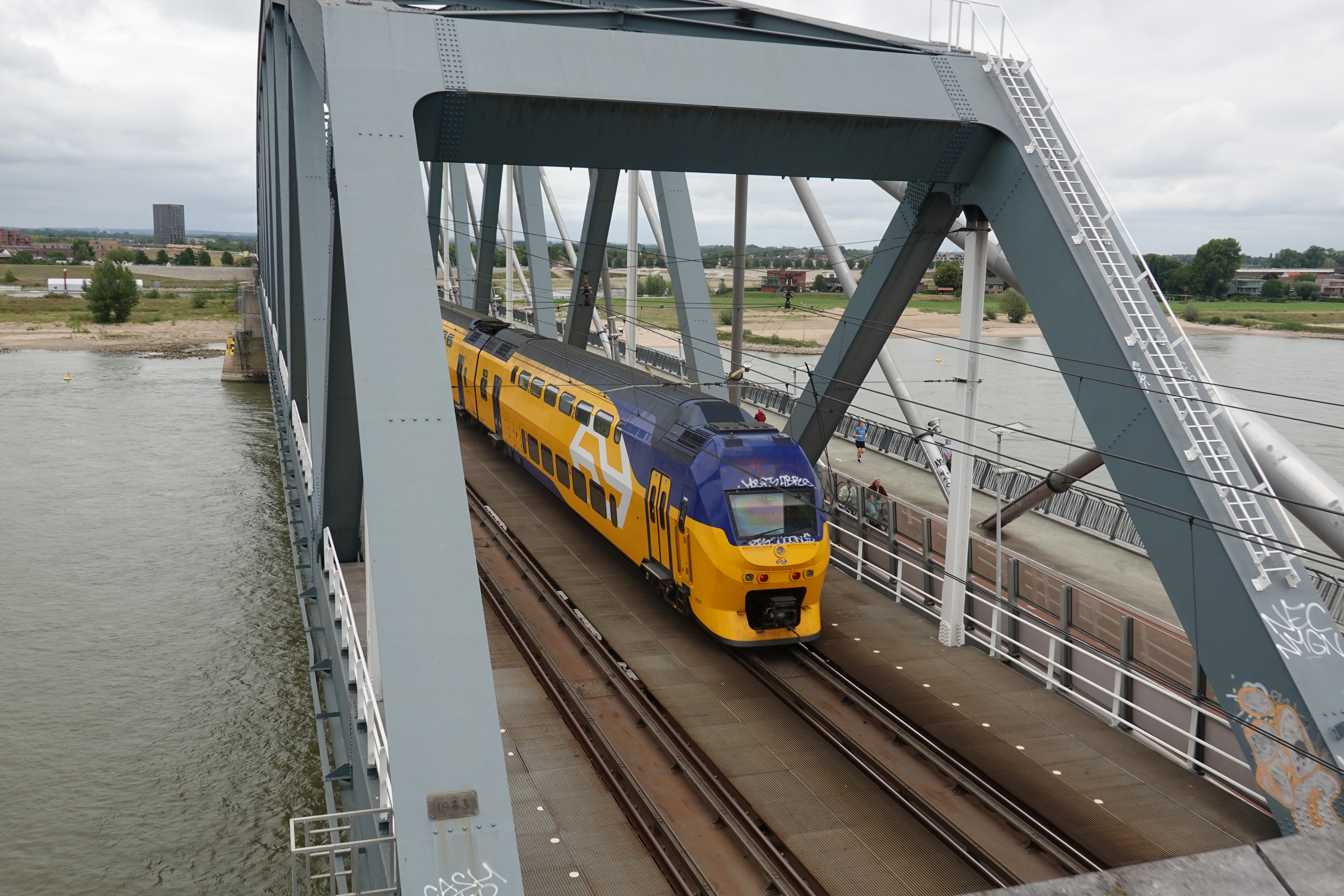
Spoorbrug Nijmegen over the Waal.

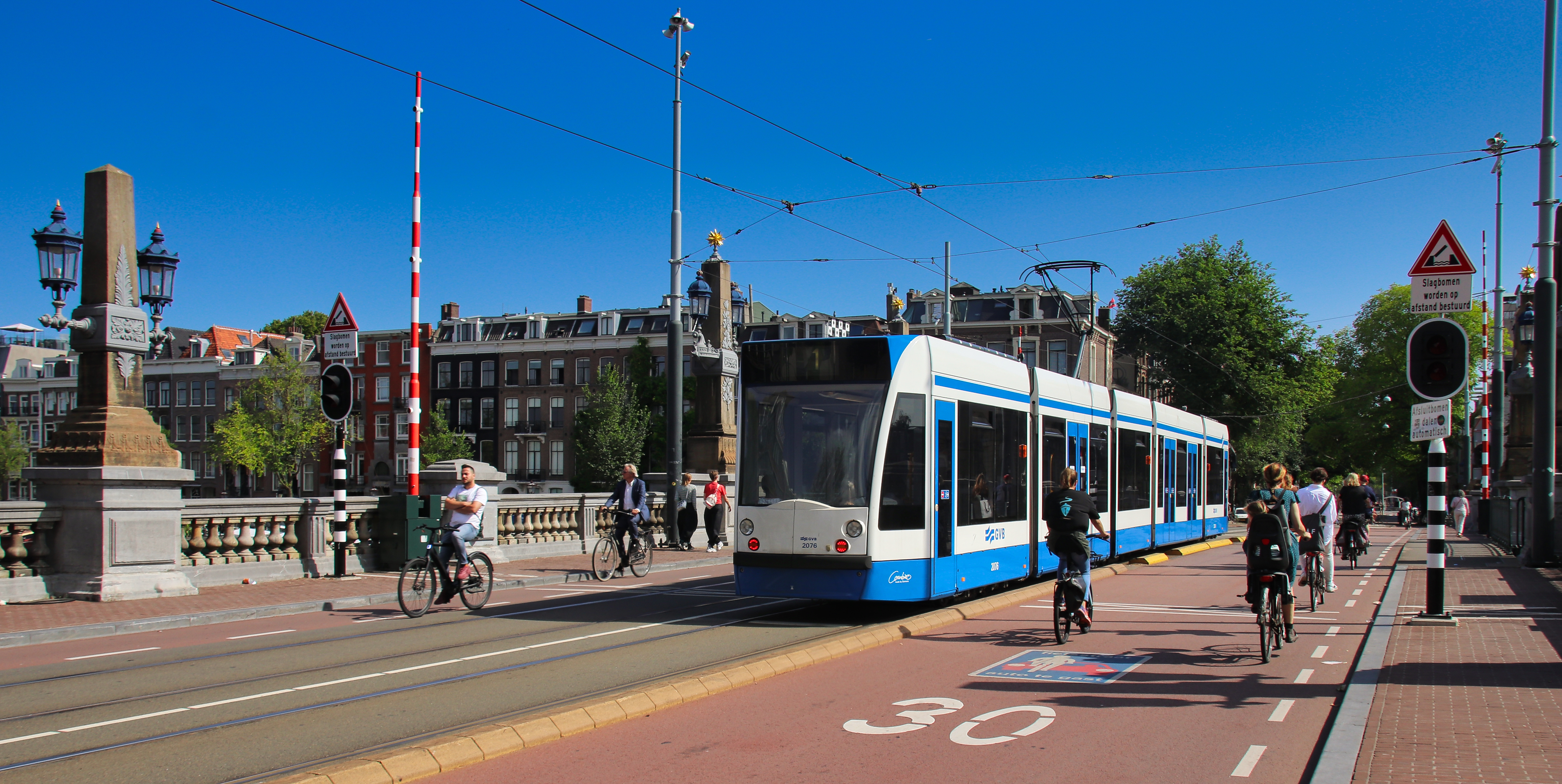
Cyclists & a tram on the Blauwbrug.

=== Current ===
- Bolbrug
- Botlek Bridge
- Bridge at Westervoort
- Bridge over the Linge
- Demka Railway Bridge
- Hanzeboog
- IJsselspoorbrug
- Muider Railway Bridge
- Nijmegen Railway Bridge
- Suurhoff Bridge
- Venlo Railway Bridge
- Vlakebrug
- Walfridus Bridge
- Bridges for light rail & trams:
  - Blauwbrug
  - Bridge 2002
  - Enneüs Heerma Bridge
  - Erasmusbrug

=== Former ===
- Calandbrug

== New Zealand ==
A 1930 report listed 33 bridges and estimated that the cost of bridge-keepers, extra maintenance for the decks, etc. amounted to £15,500 a year, as against £4,307 paid to NZR.

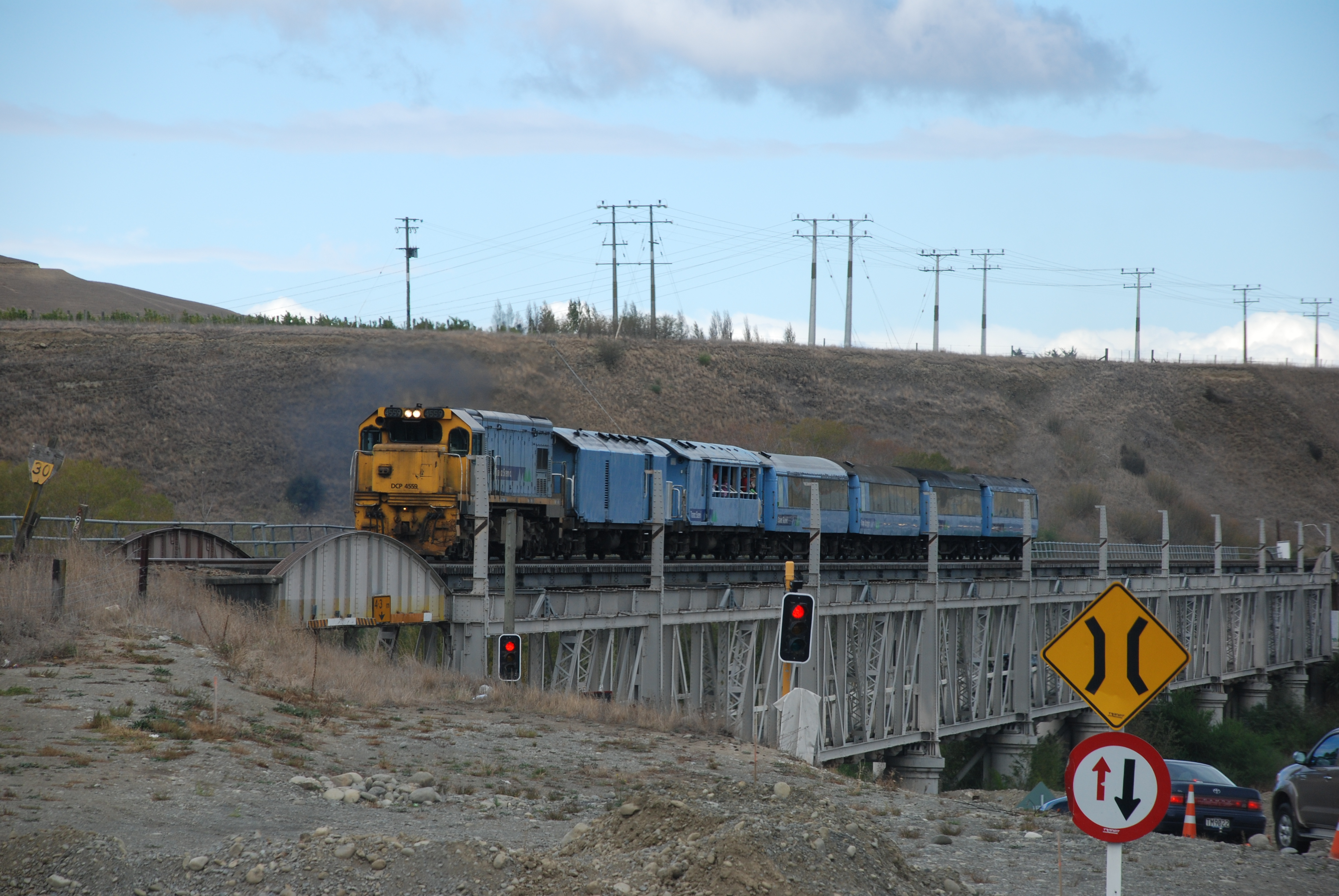
The Coastal Pacific using the upper level of the Seddon bridge in April 2007. Road vehicles used the lower level until a new bridge was opened in November 2007.

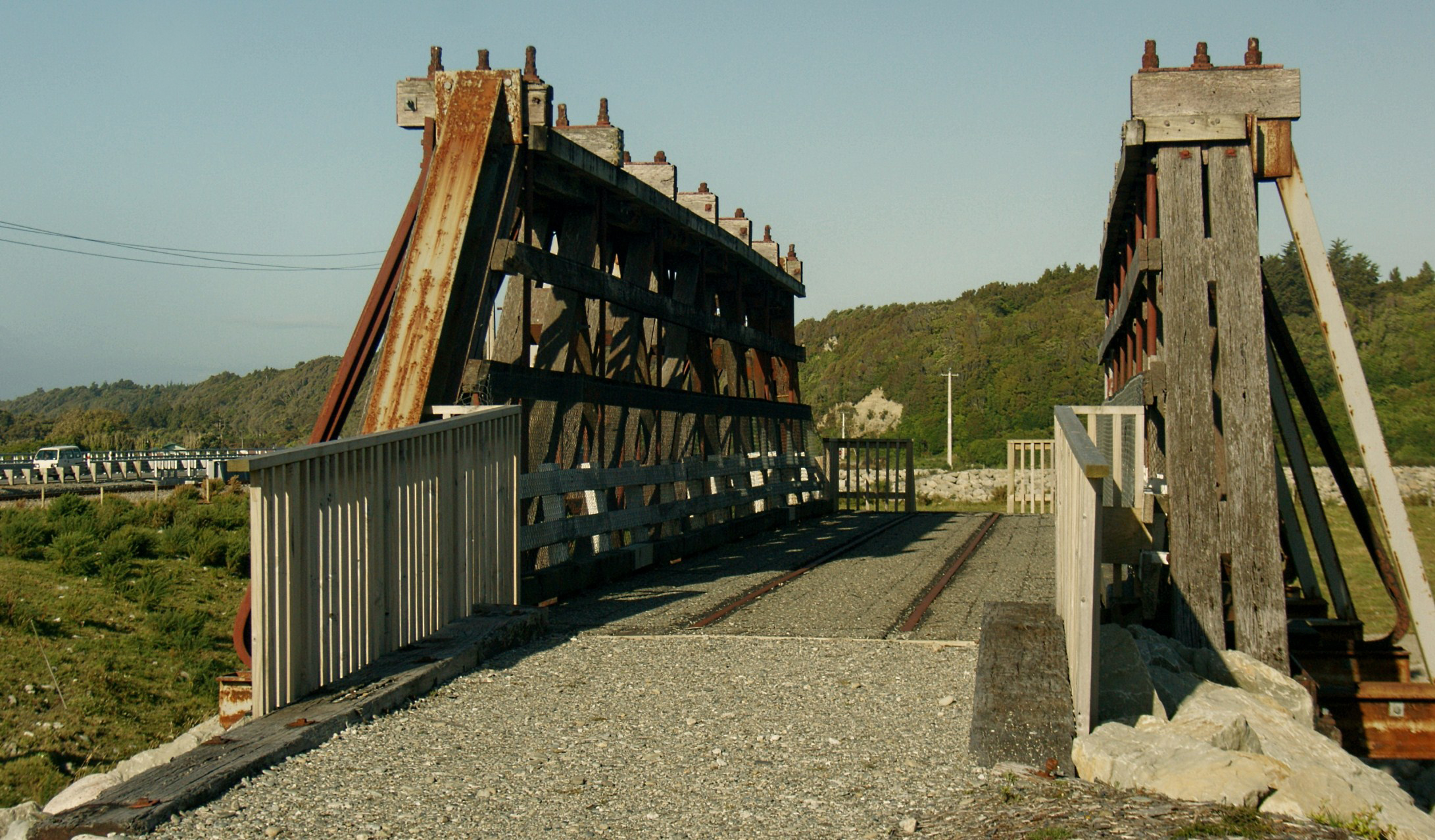
Section of Arahura Bridge – standing beside the new bridge as an example of this rare type of construction.

=== Current ===
- Alexandra – Manuherikia River, Central Otago Line – single level, shared deck (rail closed)
- Okahukura – Stratford–Okahukura Line between Taumarunui and Ōhura – two level, road under rail 1933-2009 (rail disused)
- Taramakau River – Ross Branch – single level, shared deck
- Hindon, New Zealand – Taieri Gorge Railway – single level – converted from rail only
- Sutton, near Middlemarch, New Zealand – Taieri Gorge Railway – single level
- Napier – Palmerston North – Gisborne Line – single level, separate decks (road closed)
- Inangahua – Stillwater–Ngawakau Line – single level, separate decks
- Arahura, near Hokitika – Ross Branch – single level, separate decks (replaced single level, shared deck bridge)
- Seddon – Main North Line over Awatere River – two level, single lane road under rail (road closed in November 2007); see picture above of Coastal Pacific crossing the bridge in April 2007

=== Former ===
- Arahura River – between Greymouth and Hokitika – single level – replaced in 2009
- Blackball combined over Grey River
- Huntly 1915–1959 (now rail/footbridge only) over Waikato River
- Ngākawau River separated in 1939
- Pekatahi – between Edgecumbe and Taneatua – single level, shared deck – track removed in 2017
- Rakaia – separated in 1939
- Taramakau River Bridge between Greymouth and Kumara - dual use from opening in 1893 until a separate road bridge opened alongside in 2018. This bridge was the last single-level or shared carriageway bridge in the country.
- Waitaki – separated around the late 1950s
- Whanganui River near Taumarunui - dual use until separate road bridge opened upstream in 1960s.

=== Temporary ===
- Wairoa River – due to road bridge washaway 2008

== Nigeria ==
- Old Bridge, Makurdi

== North Korea ==
- Sino-Korean Friendship Bridge
- Korea–Russia Friendship Bridge

== Norway ==
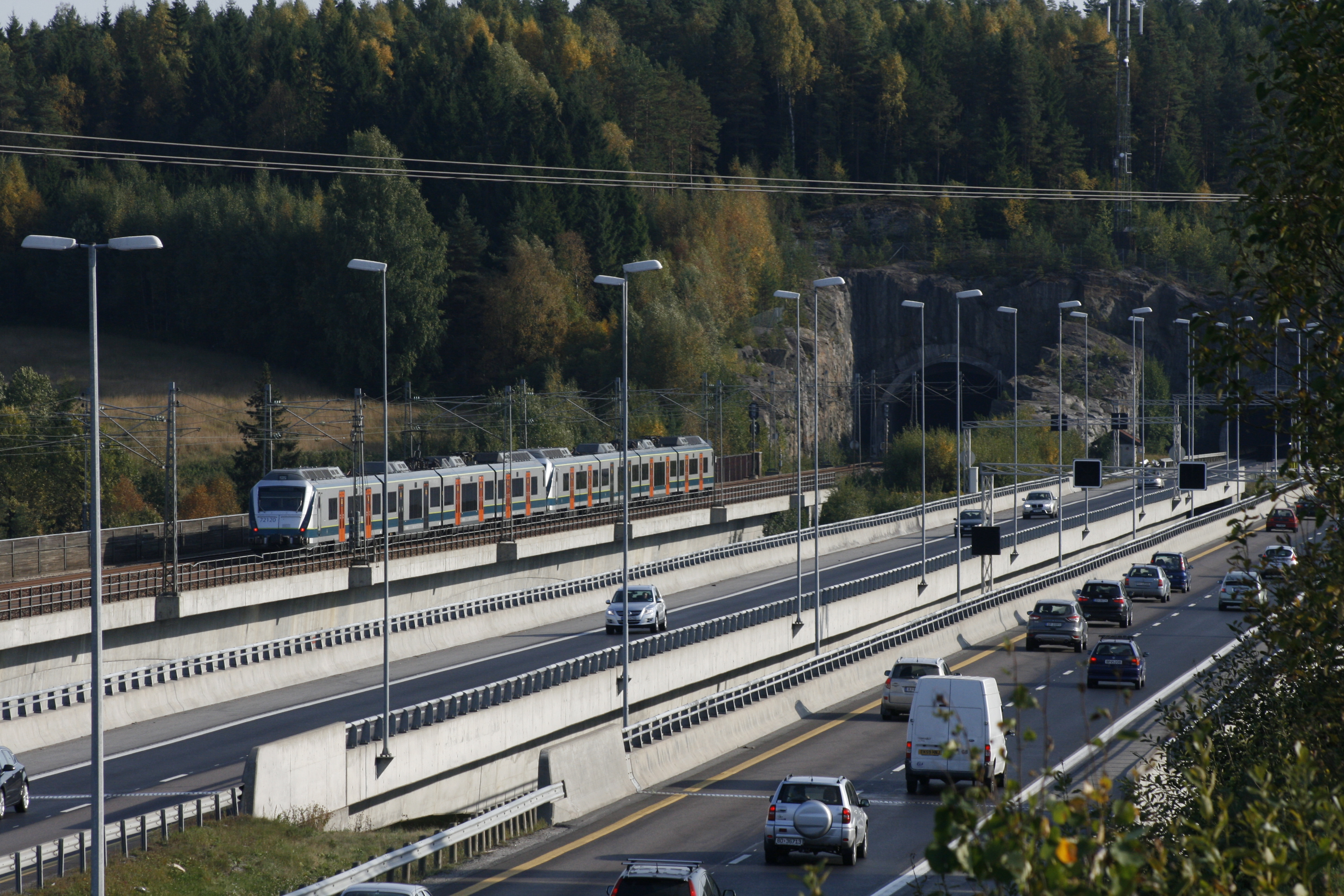
The Hølendalen Bridges (2013)

=== Current ===
- Hølendalen Bridges, near Moss. Motorway and railway, parallel separate bridges.
- Nygård Bridge, in Bergen, carries both the Bergen Light Rail and a street. A parallel bridge carries European Route E39.

=== Former ===
- Rødberg Bridge, carried the now closed Numedal Line to its terminus in Rødberg, and the highway continuing to Geilo over Upsetelva in the center of Rødberg. The rails are still in place, covered by tarmac. There has been no rail traffic on Numedalsbanen since 1988. The railway is in the road, so car traffic had to stop when trains were passing.
- Bruhaug Bridge, also on the Numedal Line, carried both the railway and local car traffic over the river Numedalslågen. The road surface is wood.
- Fetsund Bridge, the combined road-rail bridge built in 1919.
- Sarp Bridge, the original multi-level road-rail bridge in 1879.

== Pakistan ==
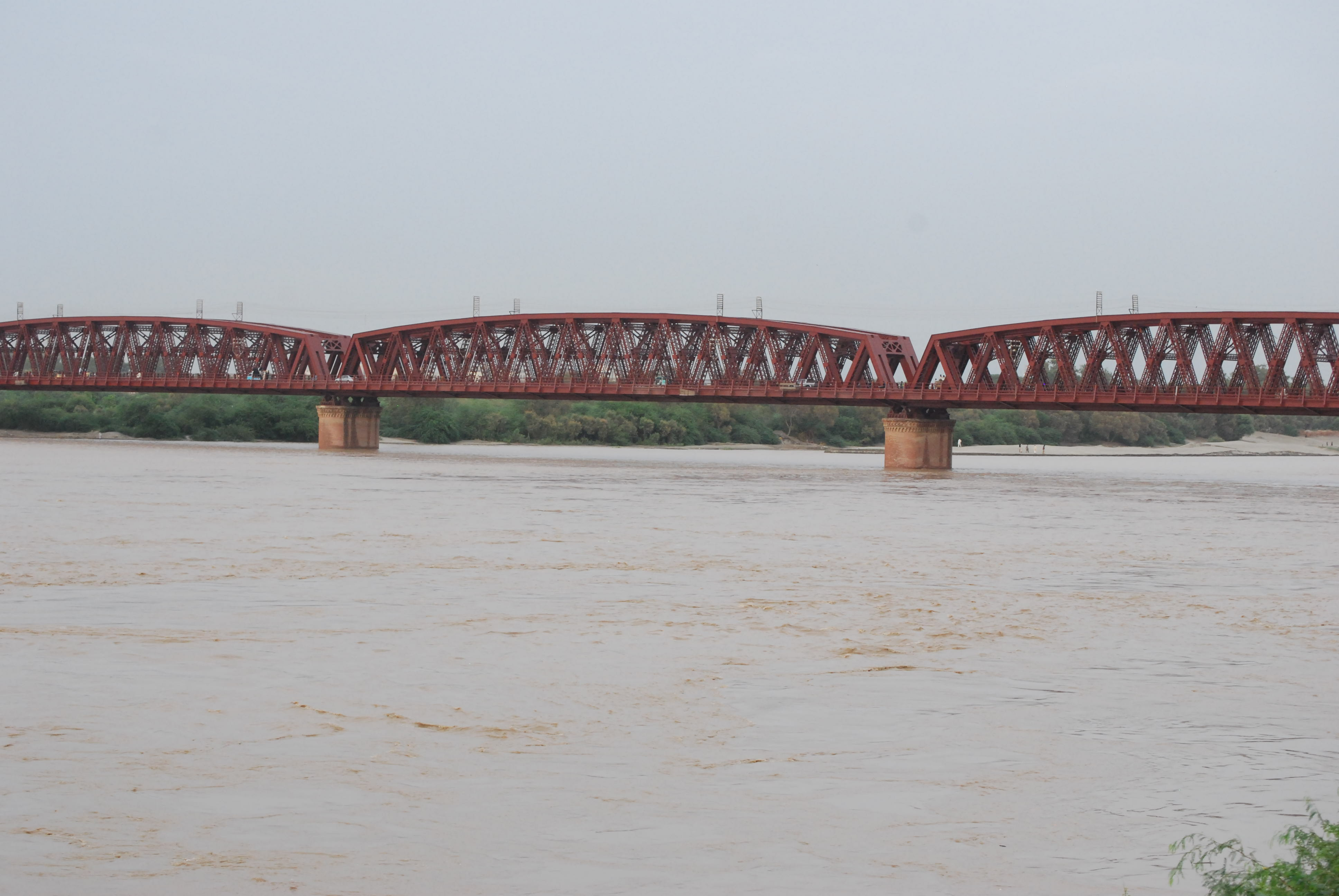
Kotri Bridge near Hyderabad, carrying roads and a single-track railway across the Indus River.

=== Current ===
- Attock Bridge
- Chund Bridge
- Jhelum Bridge
- Khushal Garh Bridge
- Kotri Bridge
- Rail bridge under a Metrobus elevated viaduct, near Marir Chowk (Murree Road, Rawalpindi).

=== Former ===
- Lansdowne Bridge – carried rail until Ayub Bridge was built.

== Paraguay ==
- San Roque González de Santa Cruz Bridge

== Philippines ==
- Guadalupe Bridge – linking Makati and Mandaluyong over the Pasig River. The road bridge carrying EDSA is below the rail bridge of MRT Line 3.

== Poland ==
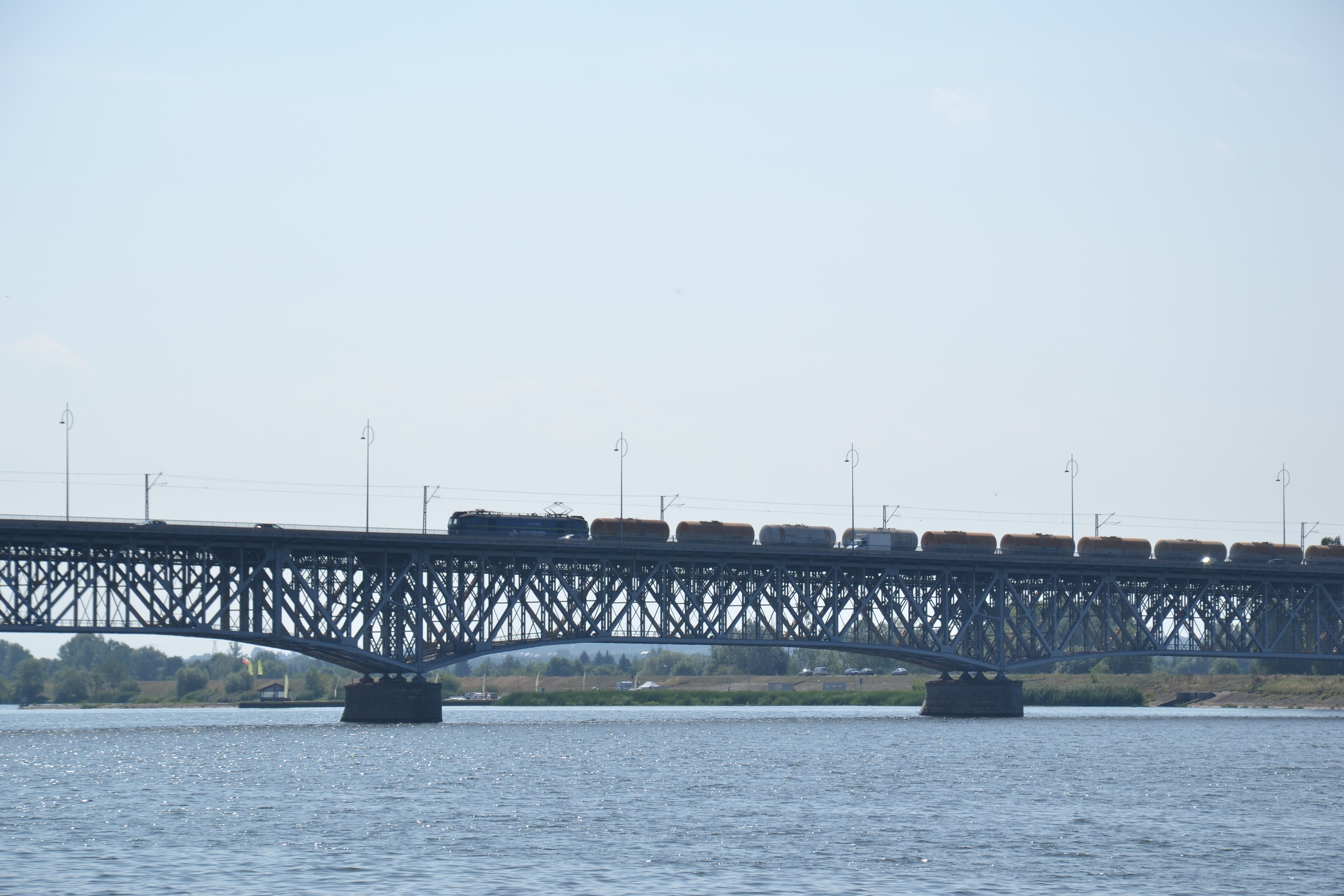
Legions of Marshal Józef Piłsudski Bridge over the Vistula.

=== Current ===
- Legions of Marshal Józef Piłsudski Bridge
- Bridges for light rail & trams:
  - Gdańsk Bridge
  - Grunwald Bridge
  - Maria Skłodowska-Curie Bridge
  - Poniatowski Bridge
  - Silesian–Dąbrowa Bridge

=== Former ===
- Citadel Rail Bridge
- Kierbedź Bridge
- Oławski Bridge

== Portugal ==
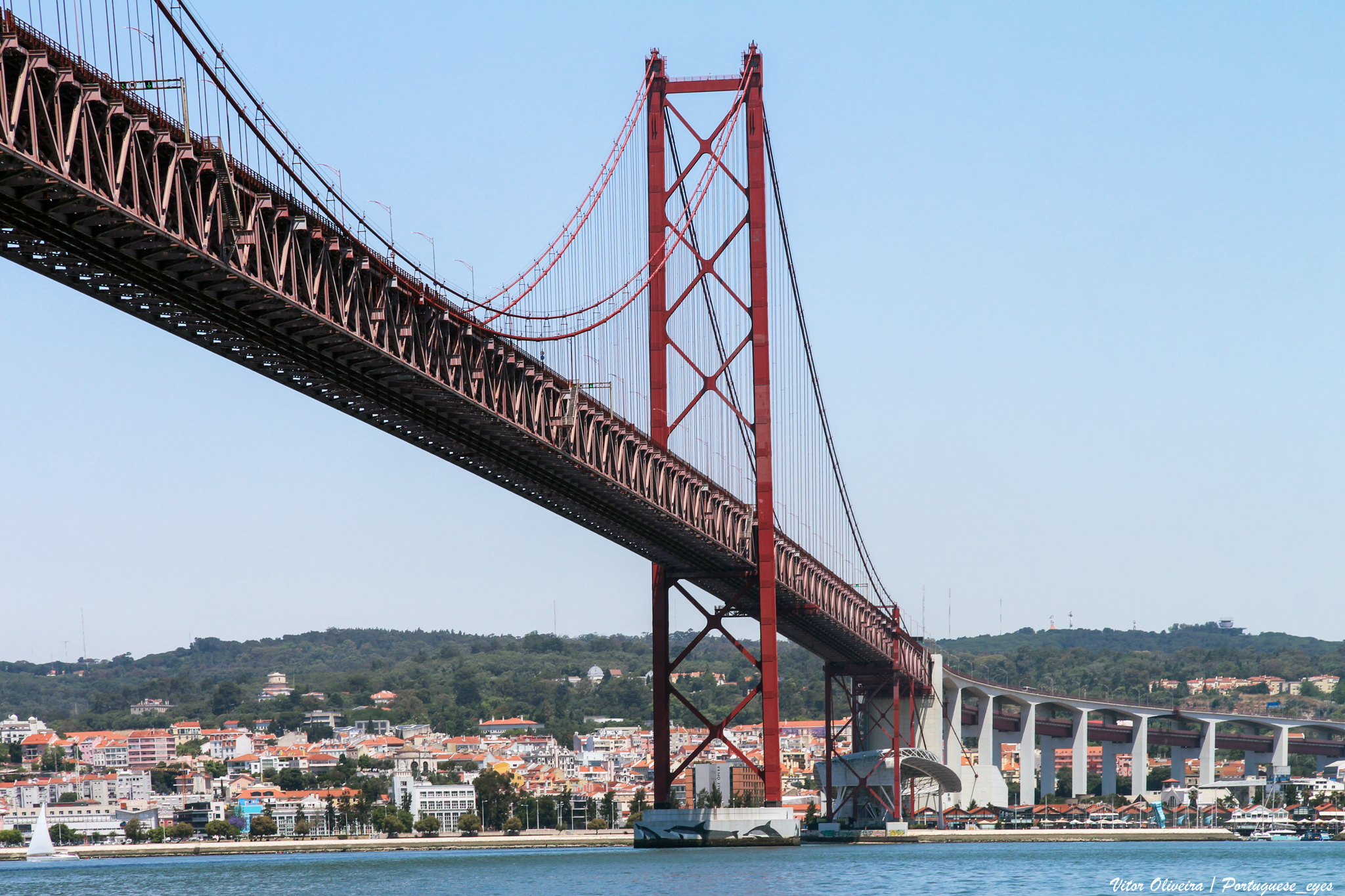
25 de Abril Bridge in Lisbon, a double-decker bridge.

=== Current ===
- 25 de Abril Bridge
- Jafafe Bridge (in Sernada do Vouga)
- Ponte Eiffel
- Praia do Ribatejo Bridge
- Valença International Bridge
- Bridges for light rail & trams:
  - Dom Luís I Bridge (Ponte Luiz I)

=== Former ===
- Alvega Bridge (Ramal do Pego) – railway branch no longer used.
- Guadiana Bridge (Ramal de Moura)
- Pocinho Bridge

== Romania ==
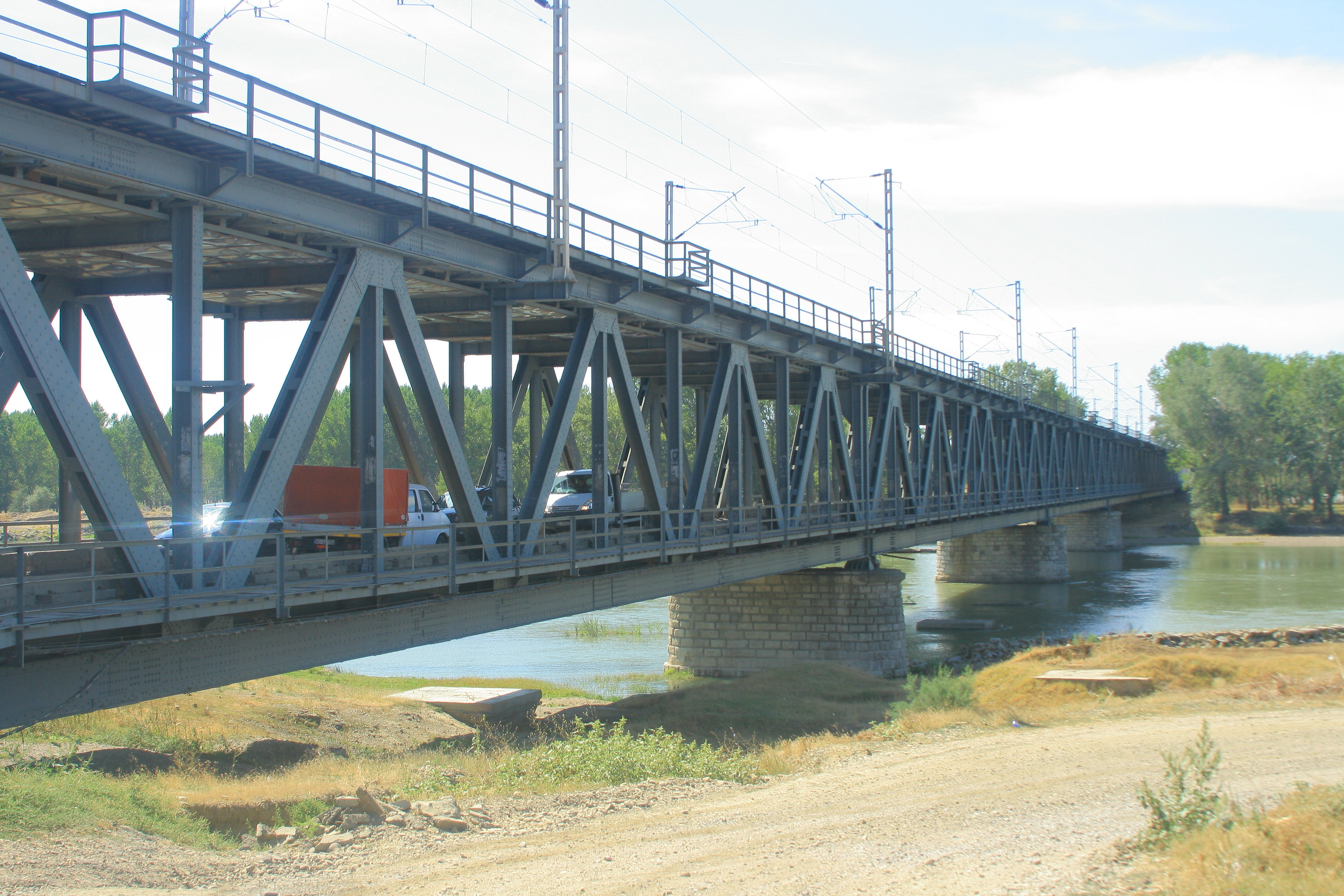
Bridge over the Siret in Cosmești.

- Cernavodă Bridge
- Danube Bridge
- New Europe Bridge
- Rail bridge over the Siret in Cosmești
- Bridges for light rail & trams:
  - Basarab Overpass
  - Podul Grant

== Russia ==
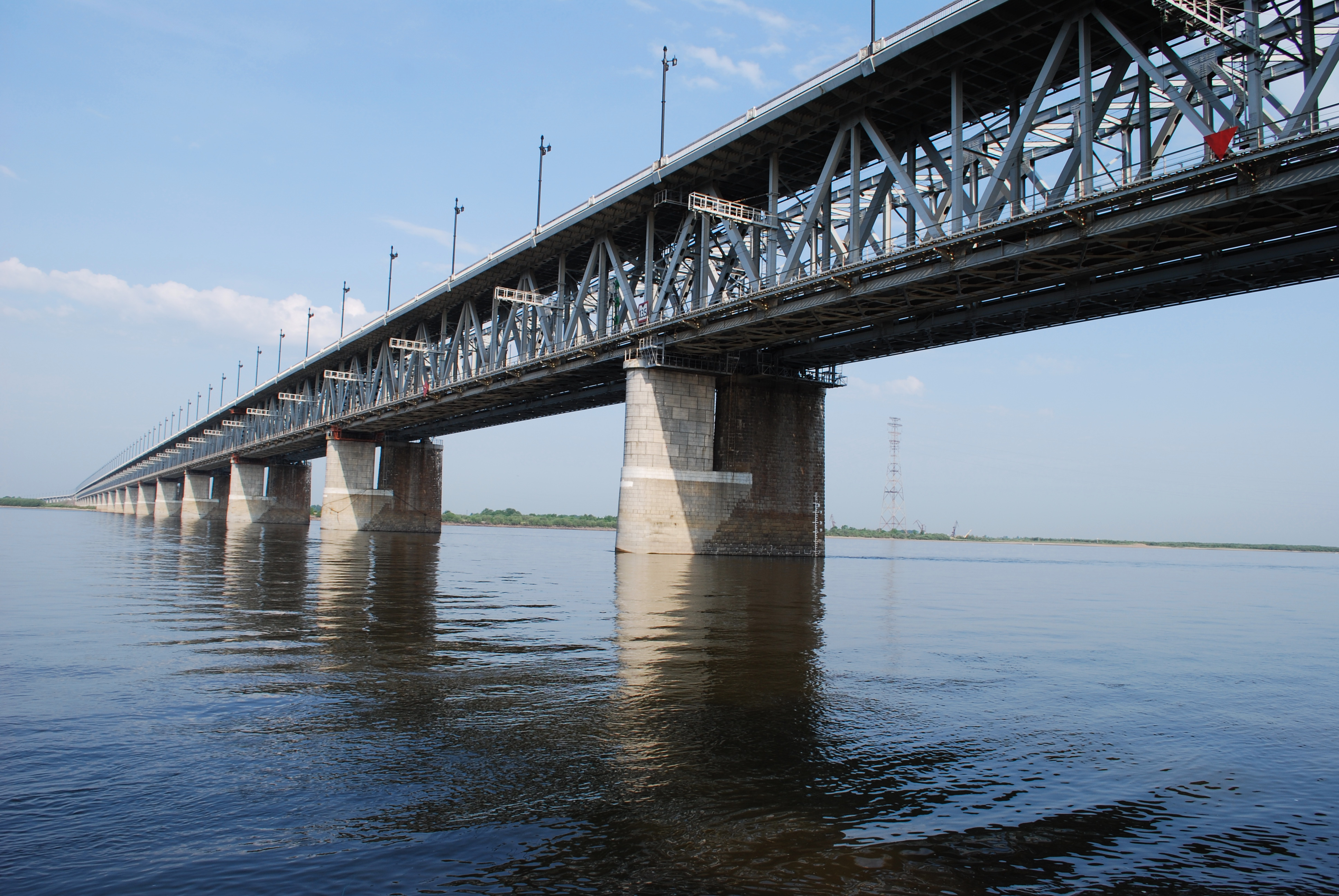
Khabarovsk Bridge over the Amur.

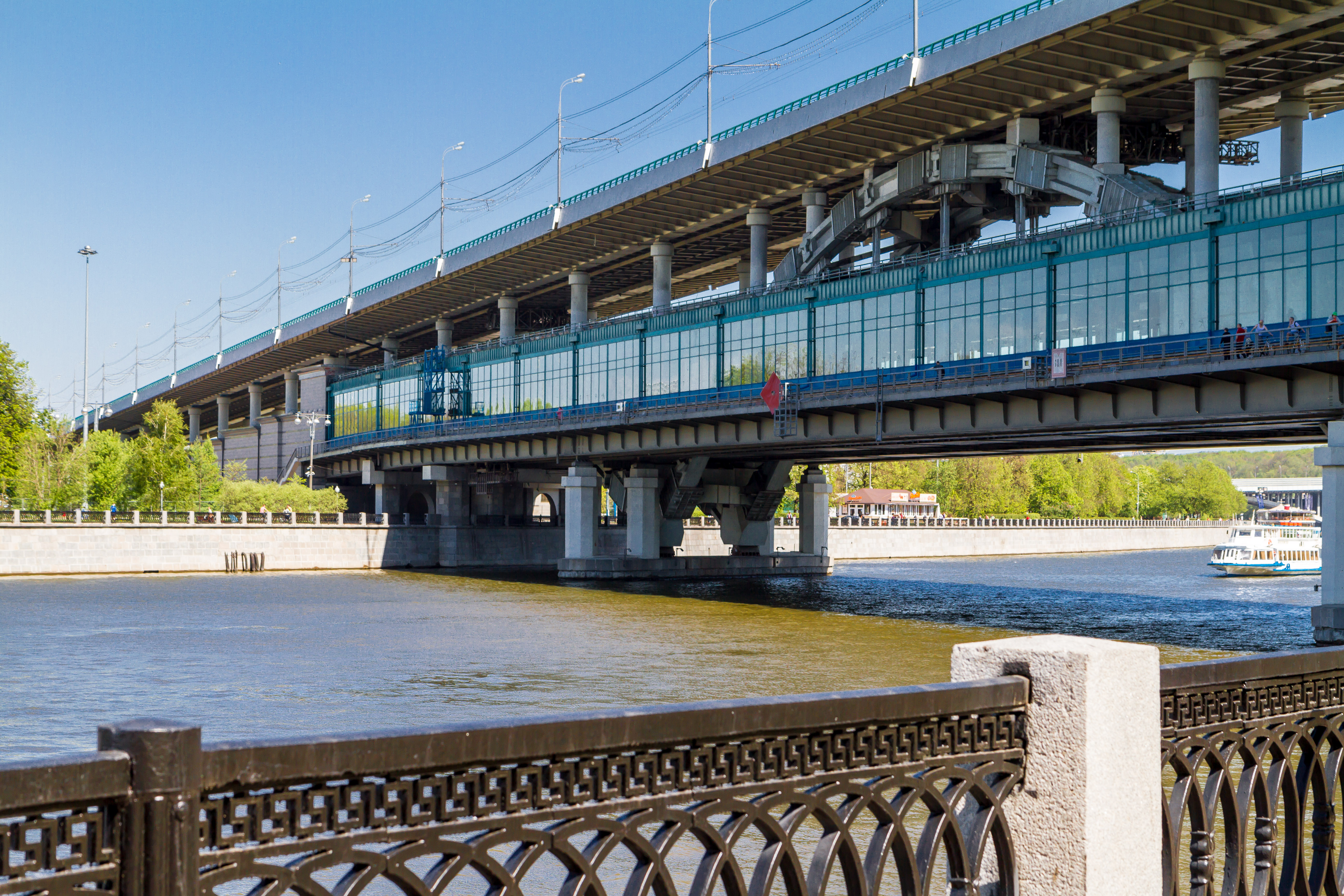
Luzhniki Metro Bridge in Moscow.

=== Current ===
- 60 Years Of Victory Bridge
- 777 Bridge
- Borsky Bridge
- Crimean Bridge
- Imperial Bridge
- Khabarovsk Bridge
- Komsomolsk-on-Amur Bridge
- Lodeynopolsky Bridge
- Luzhniki Metro Bridge
- Nadym River Bridge
- Nizhny Novgorod Metro Bridge
- Rail bridge over the Pregolya in Kaliningrad
- Severodvinsk Bridge

=== Former ===
- Kichkassky Bridge

== Serbia ==
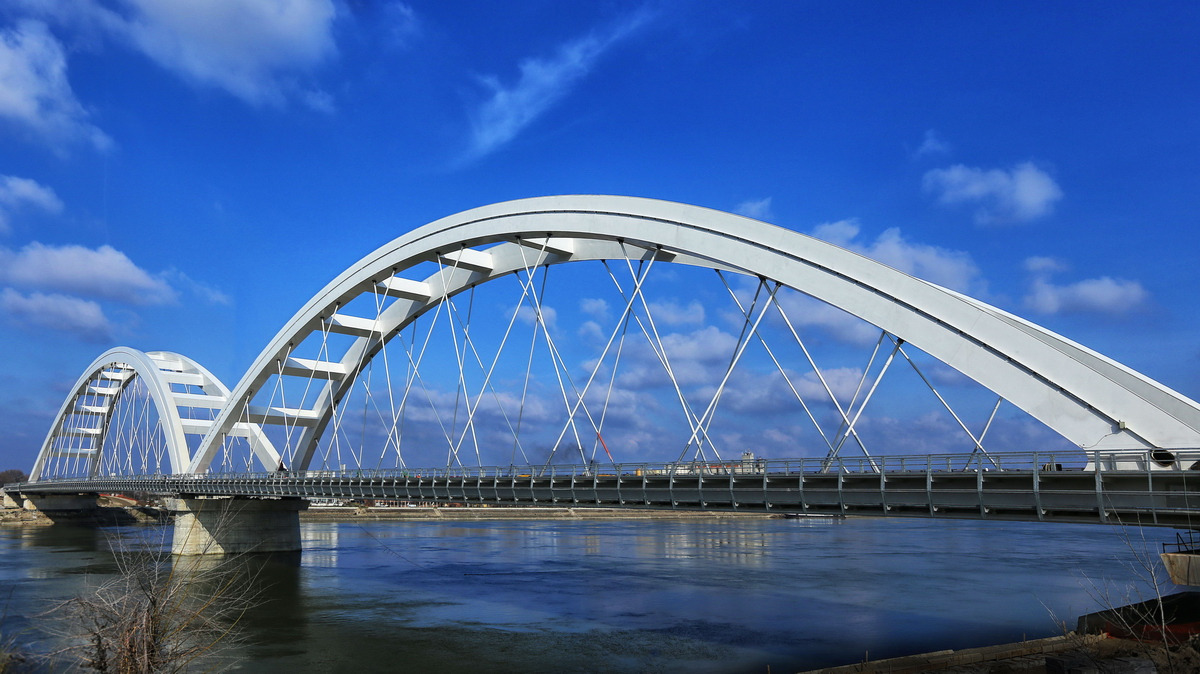
Žeželj Bridge (2018)

=== Current ===
- Ada Bridge (rail track under construction)
- Pančevo Bridge
- Rača Bridge (same carriageway until 2010, when a dedicated road bridge was built next to it)
- Rail bridge over the Timiș in Orlovat (same carriageway)
- Rail bridge over the Tisza in Titel
- Žeželj Bridge (2018)

=== Former ===
- Road-Railway Bridge (same carriageway, temporary, demolished 2018/19)
- Šabac Railway Bridge
- Žeželj Bridge (1961)

== Singapore ==
=== Current ===
- Tuas Viaduct – between Gul Circle and Tuas West Road stations.

=== Former ===
- Anderson Bridge, tram tracks were removed in 1927.
- Elgin Bridge, tram tracks were removed and bridge was rebuilt in 1926.

== Slovakia ==
- Prístavný most (Harbour Bridge) – over Danube river, from Bratislava center to Petržalka district.

== South Africa ==
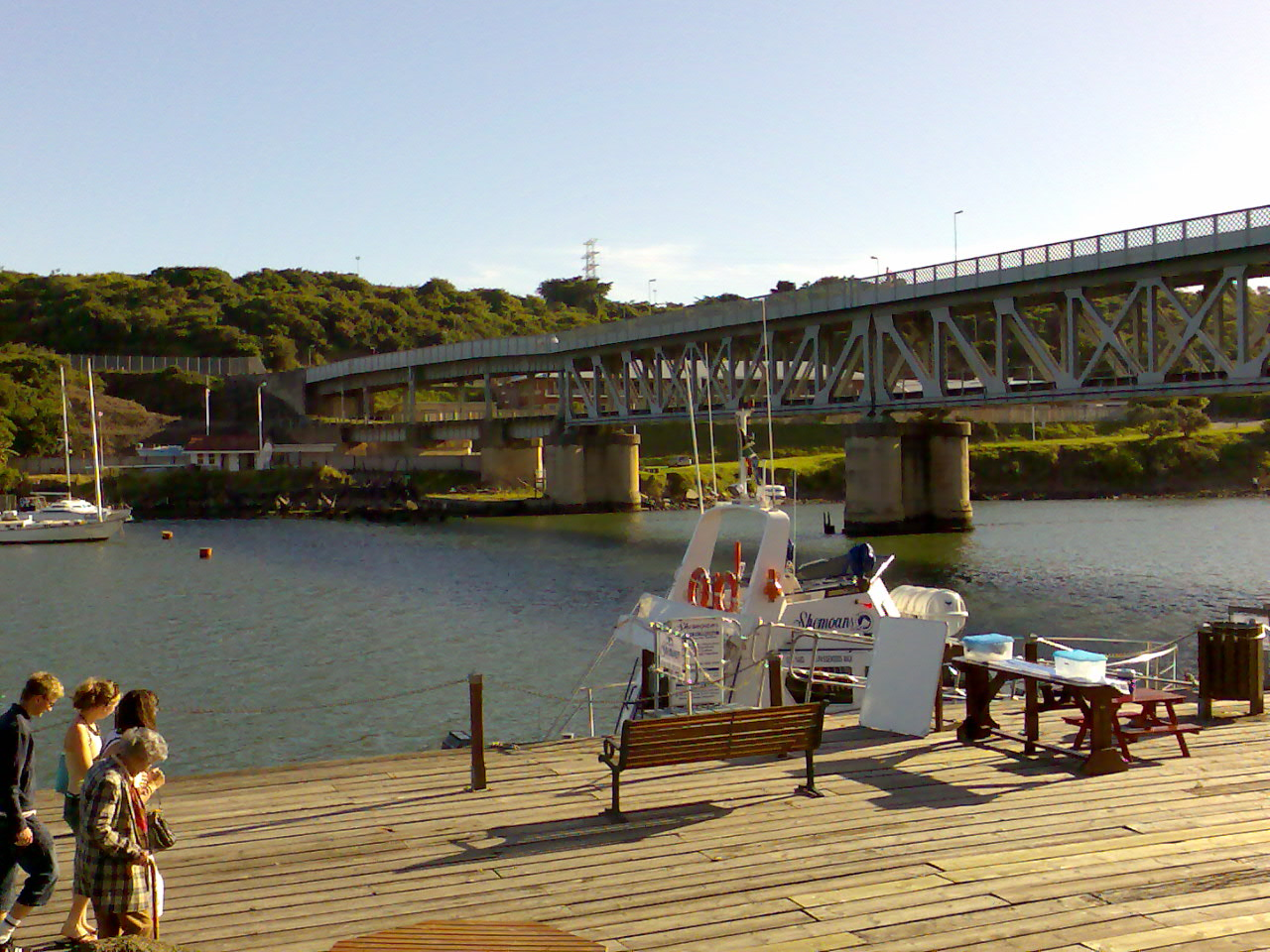
Bruce-Bayes Bridge over the Buffalo River in East London (2006).

=== Current ===
- Bruce-Bayes Bridge – in East London. A double-decker bridge.
- Hennie Steyn Bridge – near Bethulie. One of the longest bridges in South Africa.
- Rail bridge over the Touw River in Wilderness – road & George–Knysna line.
- Rail bridge over the Umkomazi River in Umkomaas
- Rail bridge over the Umzimkulu River in Port Shepstone
- Tugela Railway Bridge – in Mandeni, near the Tugela Steel Bridge.

=== Former ===
- Alfred Beit Bridge – road traffic moved to nearby Alfred Beit Road Bridge in 1995.

== South Korea ==
- Cheongdam Bridge
- Dongho Bridge
- Dongjak Bridge
- Yeongjong Bridge

== Spain ==
=== Current ===
- Tui International Bridge

=== Former ===
- Alfonso XIII Bridge (Seville)

== Sri Lanka ==
- Manampitiya Bridge – rail-only since 2006.
- Oddamavadi Bridge (Valaichchenai Bridge) – rail-only since April 2010.

== Sudan ==
- Blue Nile Bridge

== Sweden ==
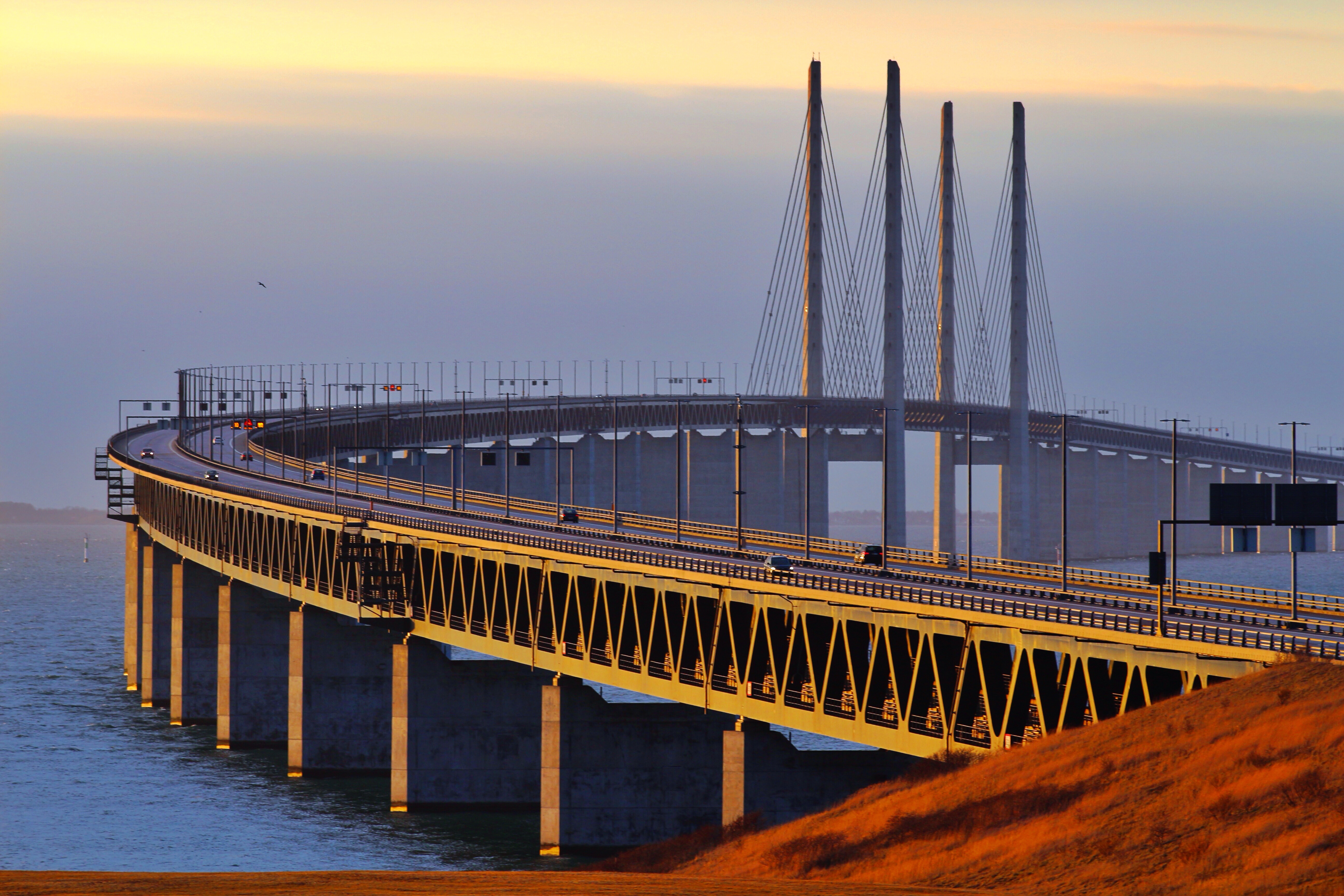
The Øresund Bridge, a multi-level bridge between Sweden and Denmark, carrying road and rail traffic.

- Øresund Bridge – 8 km long two-level bridge. Road (four lane) on top, rail (two tracks) below.
- A few narrow same-track combined road-rail bridges:
  - in Oxberg
  - in Sveg
  - north of Moskosel.
  - in Kristianstad (industry railway, road in the same track)
  - in Norrköping (industry railway, road next to the rail)
- Traneberg Bridge – in Stockholm, combined road and subway/metro rail bridge.
- Skanstull Bridge – in Stockholm, combined road and subway/metro rail bridge.
- Lidingöbron – 1 km long parallel road and rail (two separate bridges). The road bridge was built 1971; before that the old bridge had road and double track railway in the same carriageway.

== Switzerland ==
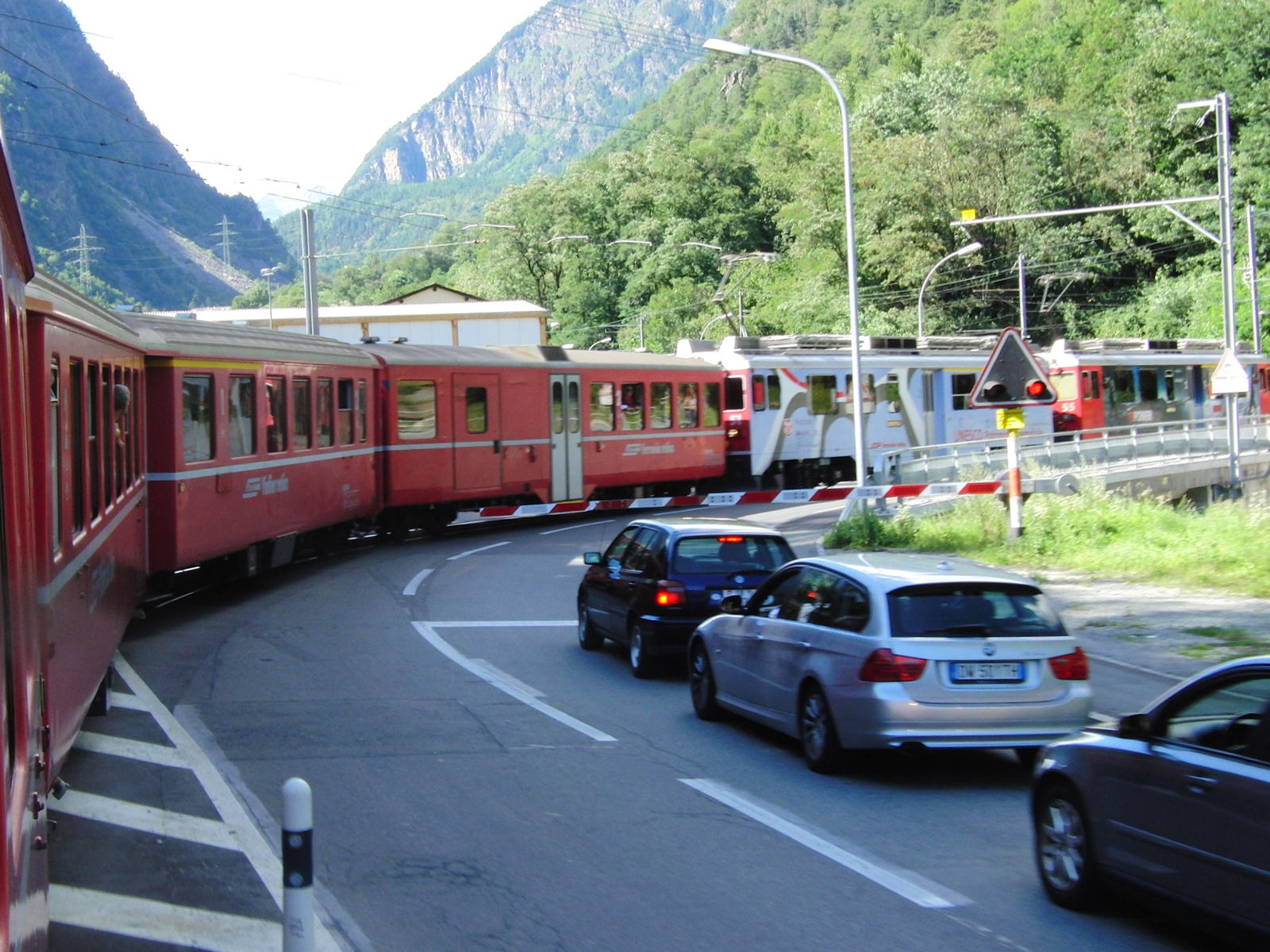
Road traffic waiting for a RhB train to cross the road-rail bridge near Campocologno railway station.

=== Current ===
- Aare Seeland mobil operates several railway lines that has road–rail bridges. Four of these bridges cross the Aare, and one of them crosses a highway.
- Rail bridge on the Melide causeway
- Rail bridges on the Seedamm
- The Bernina railway line shares a bridge with road traffic over the Poschiavino near Campocologno railway station, just north of the Italy–Switzerland border.
- Bridges for light rail & trams:
  - Bahnhofbrücke, Zurich
  - Dreirosenbrücke
  - Kirchenfeldbrücke
  - Kornhausbrücke
  - Quaibrücke, Zurich

=== Former ===
- Beznaustrasse Bridge – in Döttingen. Disused train track.
- Red Bridge (Bern)

== Thailand ==
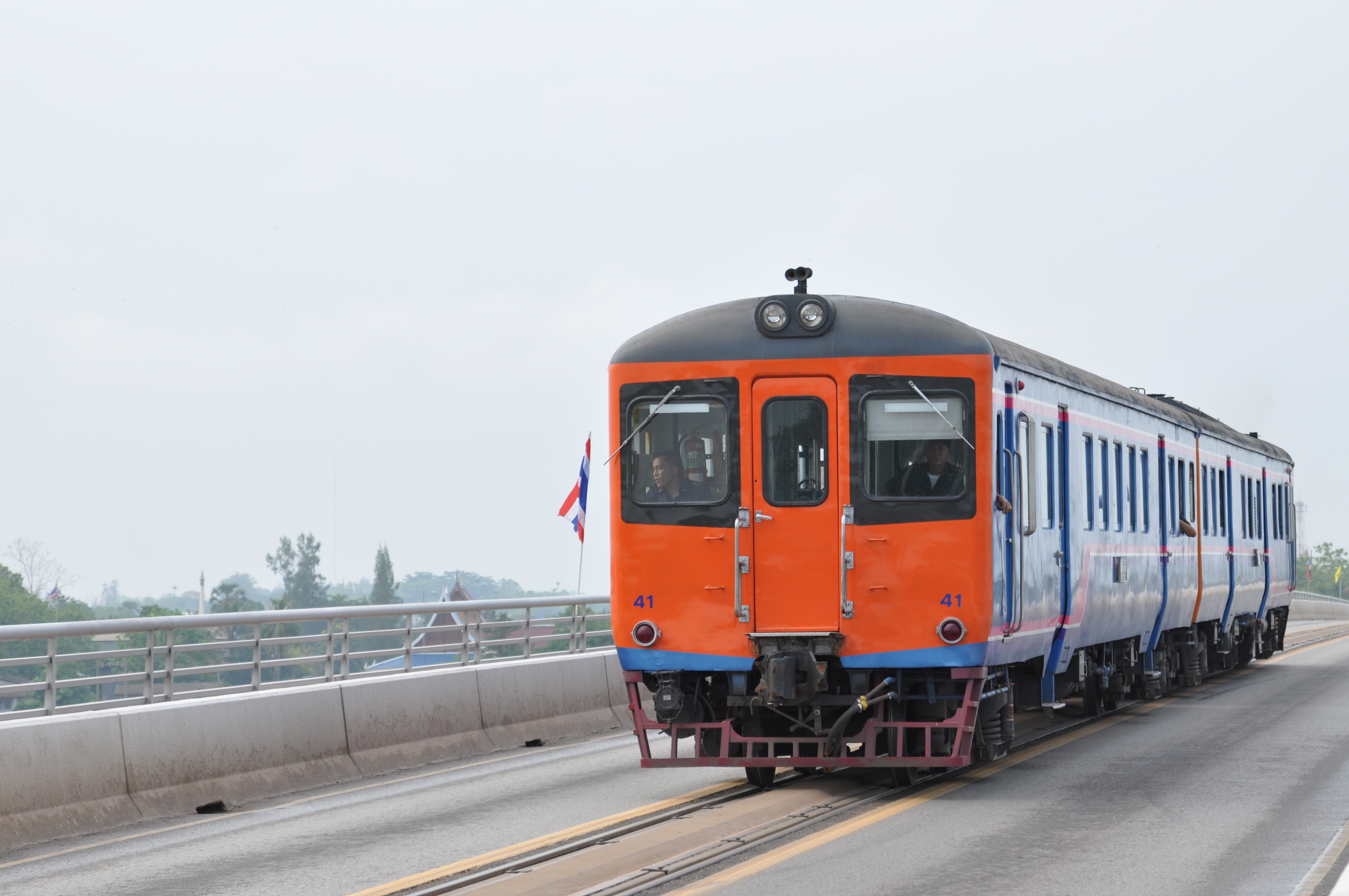
A train on the Thai–Lao Friendship Bridge (2014).

=== Current ===
- First Thai–Lao Friendship Bridge
- Taksin Bridge

=== Former ===
- Chulachomklao Bridge
- Chulalongkorn Bridge
- Rama VI Bridge (separated in 2003)

== Turkey ==
- Galata Bridge
- Gülüşkür Bridge – crosses the Keban Dam.
- Yavuz Sultan Selim Bridge

== Uganda ==
- Albert Nile Bridge (Pakwach Bridge,) – in Pakwach.
- Jinja Railway Bridge (River Nile Railway Bridge) – in Jinja.

== Ukraine ==
- Kyiv Metro Bridge – road traffic & Sviatoshynsko–Brovarska line.
- New Darnytskyi Bridge
- Pivdennyi Bridge – M06 (E40) highway & Syretsko–Pecherska line.
- Preobrazhensky Bridge

== United Kingdom ==
=== Current ===
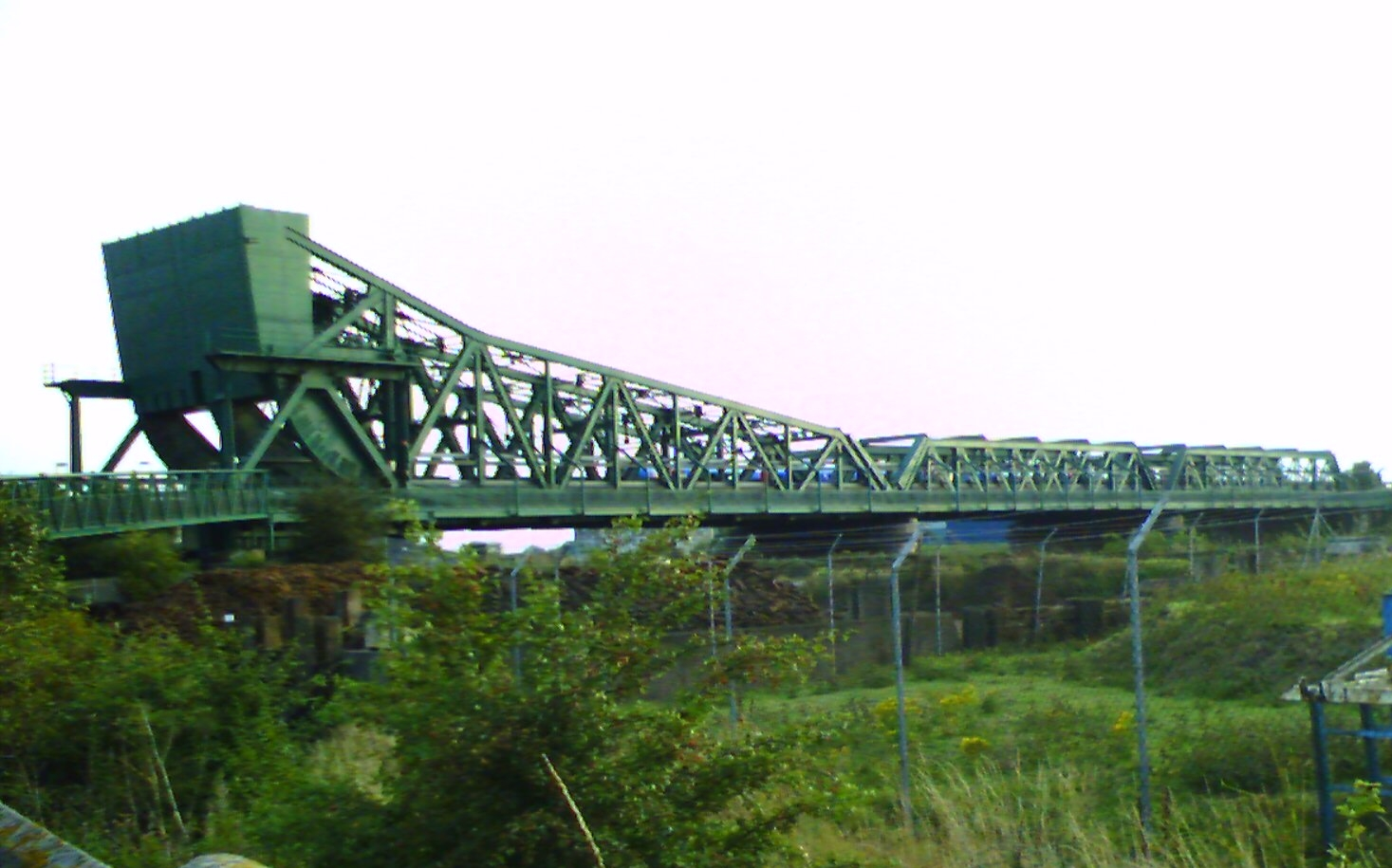
King George V Bridge

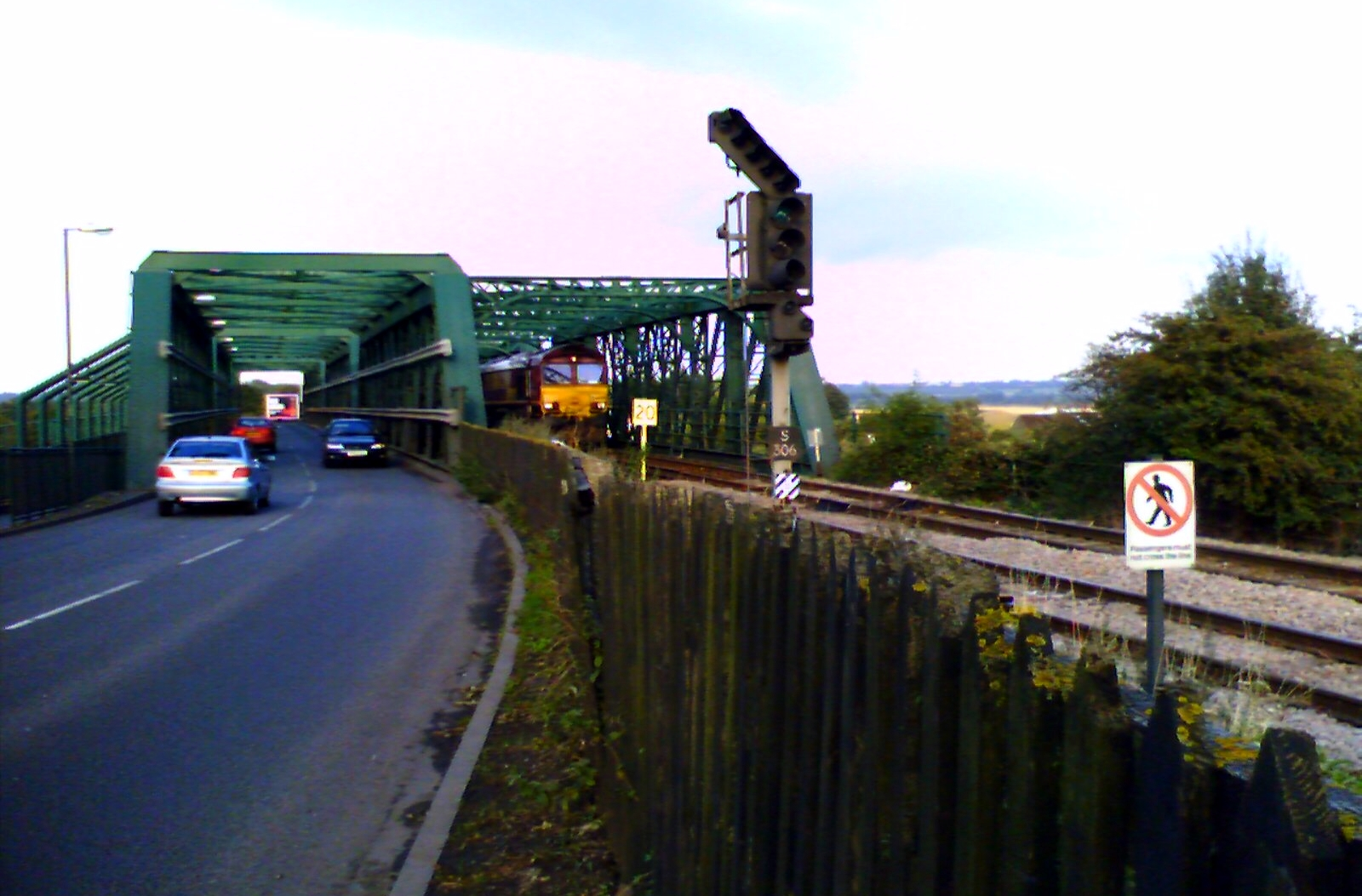
King George V Bridge showing the road and railway

- Preston Dock Swing Bridge, Lancashire. Road traffic and pedestrians controlled by barriers from the lock control room. Still used by The Ribble Steam Railway and tour trains visiting from the main line, still running in 2012 the bridge is used for delivery of bitumen by railway to the Preston Total Bitumen plant. On arrival from Total's oil refinery in Immingham, North Lincolnshire, the tankers are parked at the exchange sidings. The steam railway staff divide the trains and shunt the tankers into Total Bitumen's siding for the bitumen processing and distribution plant, later reforming the trains for their return journey to Immingham.
- Britannia Bridge Robert Stephenson's famous, formerly 'tubular' railway bridge across the Menai Strait in Wales. Rebuilt as a road and rail bridge after a major fire in 1970.
- High Level Bridge Newcastle upon Tyne.
- King George V Bridge, Keadby, North Lincolnshire. Carries the A18 and the Doncaster–Scunthorpe railway across the River Trent. Opened in 1916, Althorpe railway station is on the western bank of the Trent, very close to the bridge, which has not lifted for some years.
- Belfast cross-harbour bridge, opened 1994–1995. See The Motorway Archive
- Kingsferry road and rail bridge, Isle of Sheppey. Built in 1960, until 2006 this was the only road crossing to the island. The bridge opens 20 times each day.
- Porthmadog, Wales, on the Welsh Highland Railway, Shared by this narrow gauge line and the main road through the town.
- Pont Briwet, over River Dwyryd, near Penrhyndeudraeth, North Wales – single track rail of the Cambrian Coast Line, beside wide single-carriageway road; re-opened in summer 2015 after major repairs.

=== Former ===
- Craigavon Bridge, is a double decker bridge located in Derry, Northern Ireland and is still in operation as a road bridge, it served as a rail bridge from its opening until the 1950s,
- Connel Bridge, near Oban, Scotland, was shared until the railway closed in the 1960s. A cantilever bridge.
- Ashton Avenue Bridge, Bristol road rail swing bridge.
- Queen Alexandra Bridge, still in road (A1231) use across the River Wear between Deptford and Southwick in Sunderland, mineral railway abandoned in 1921 after 12 years' use.
- Newhaven Harbour, East Sussex, swing bridge standard gauge harbour branch shared with main coast road to Brighton, closed about 1962.
- Runcorn Railway Bridge – rail; pedestrian bridge alongside was open until 1965.
- Cross Keys Bridge, on the Norfolk /Lincolnshire border, both sides now in use for road traffic. Swing Bridge

== United States ==
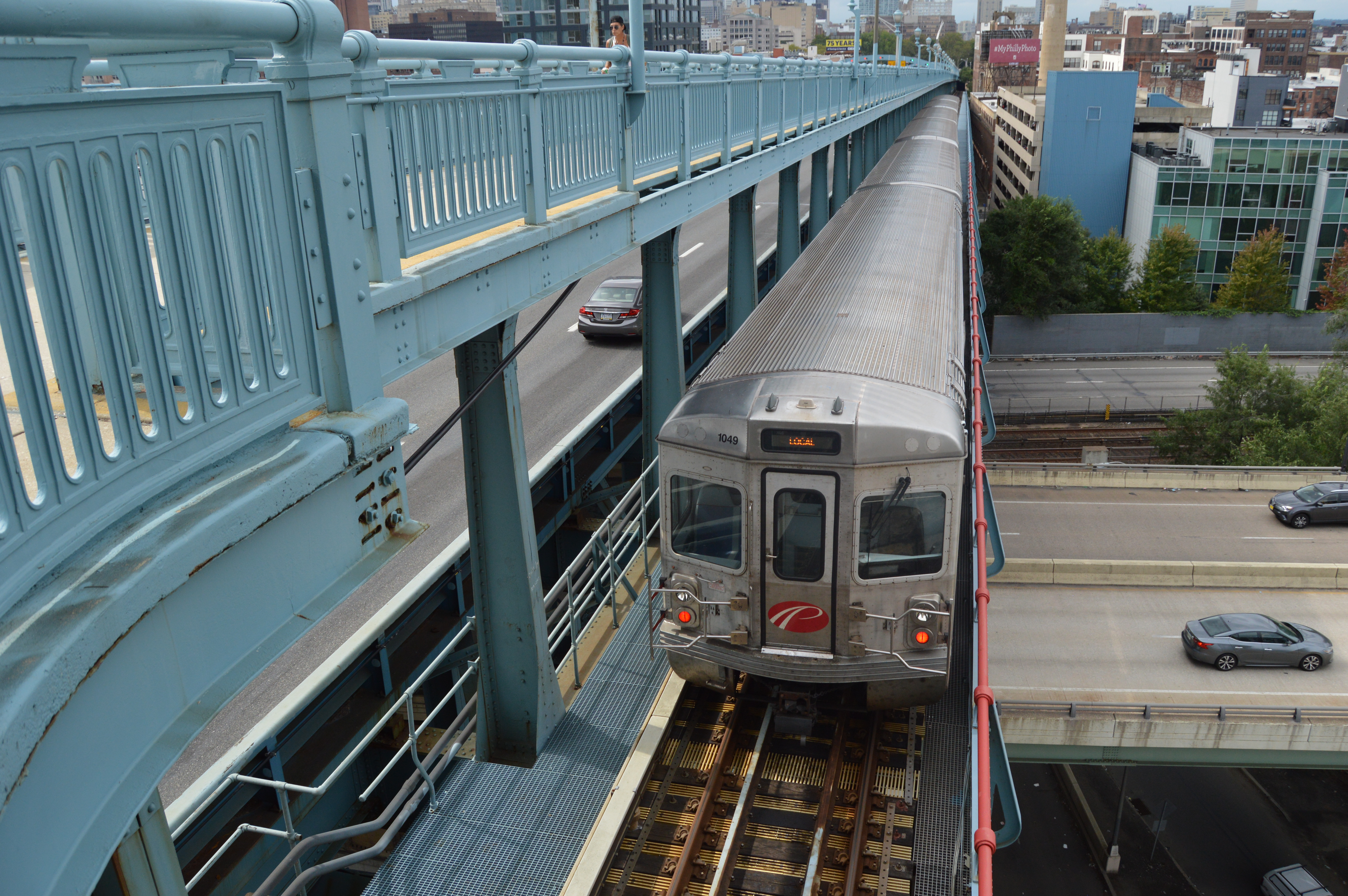
A PATCO Speedline train on the Benjamin Franklin Bridge.

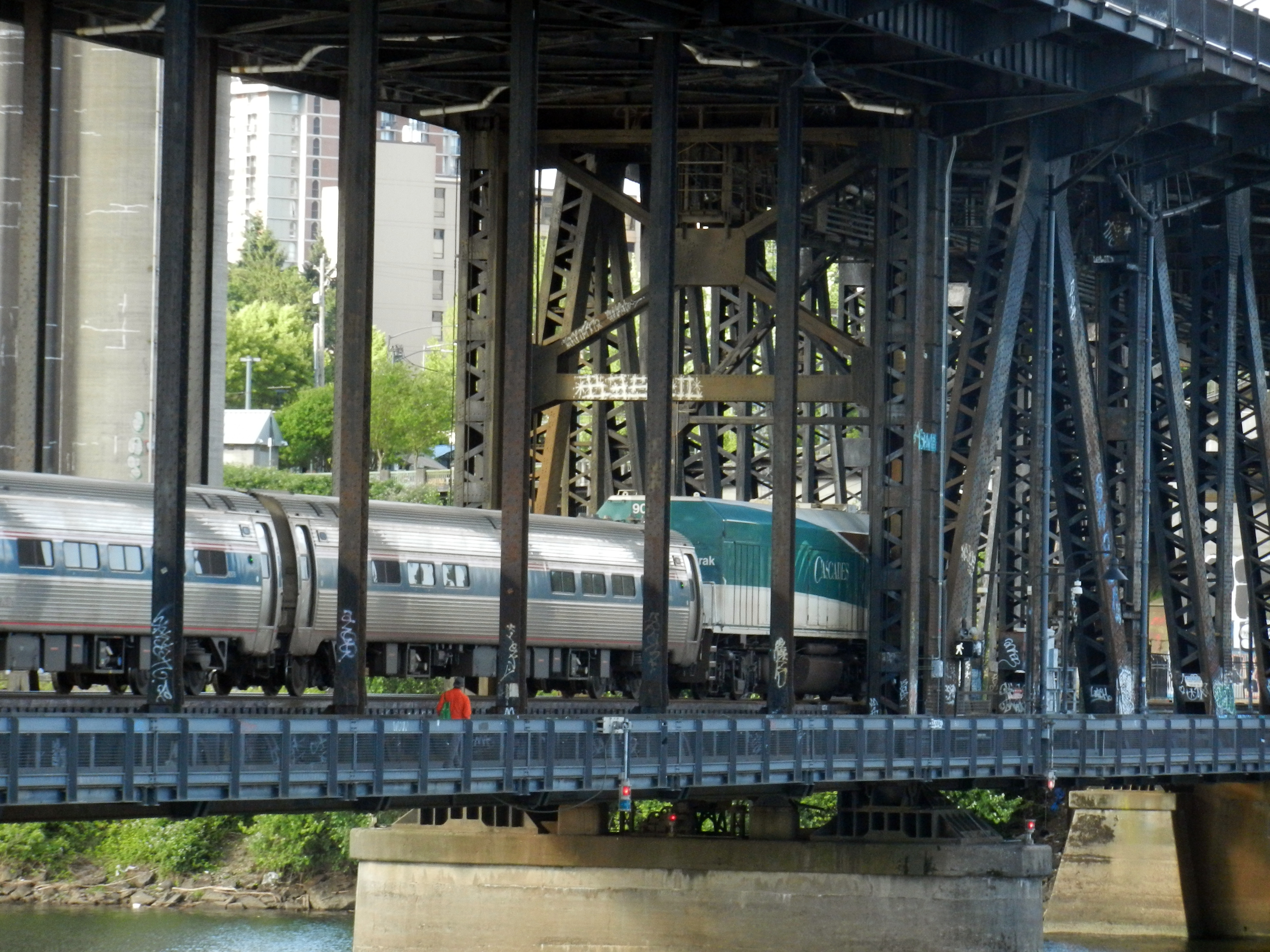
An Amtrak Cascades train on the lower deck of the Steel Bridge.

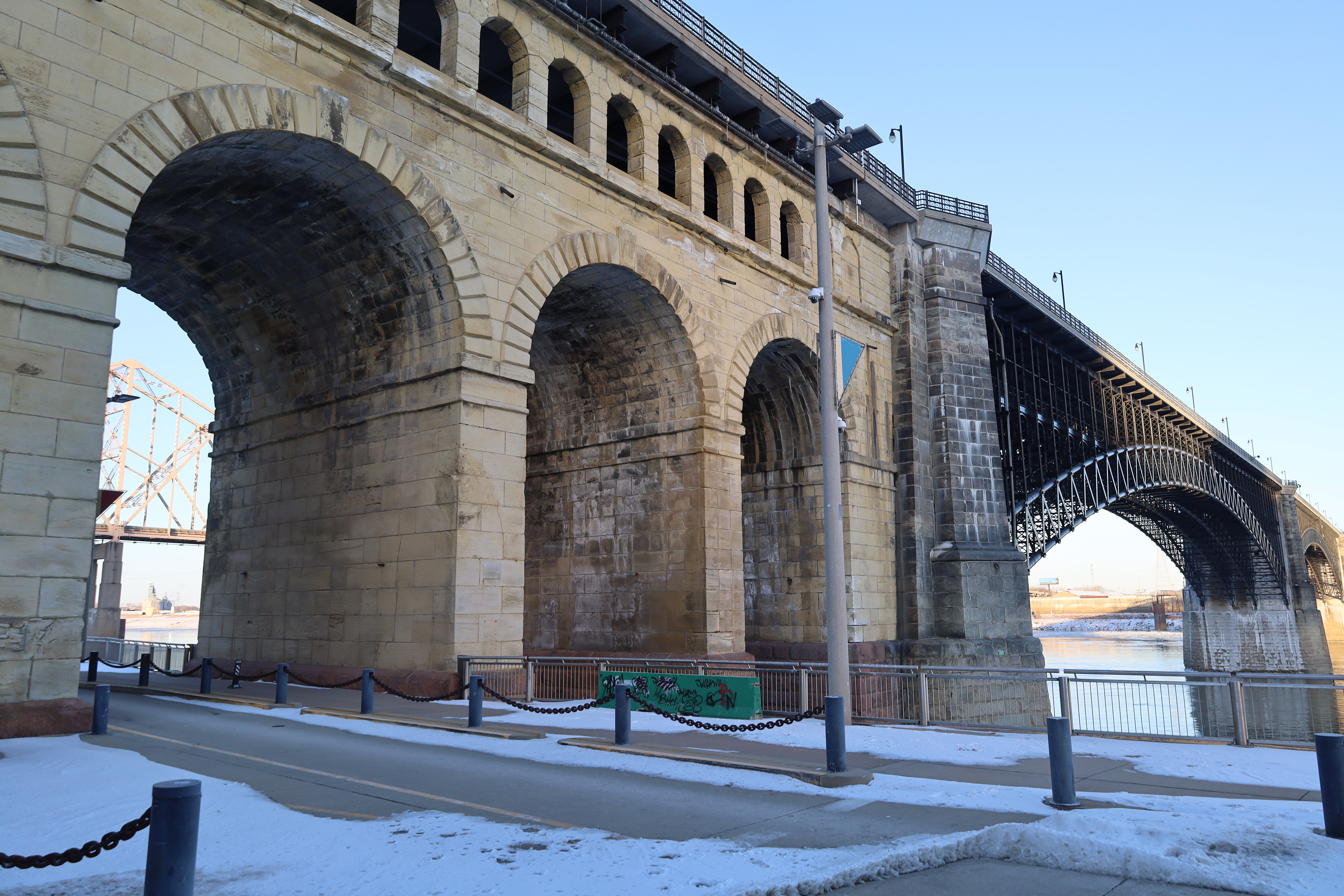
The Eads Bridge, in St. Louis.

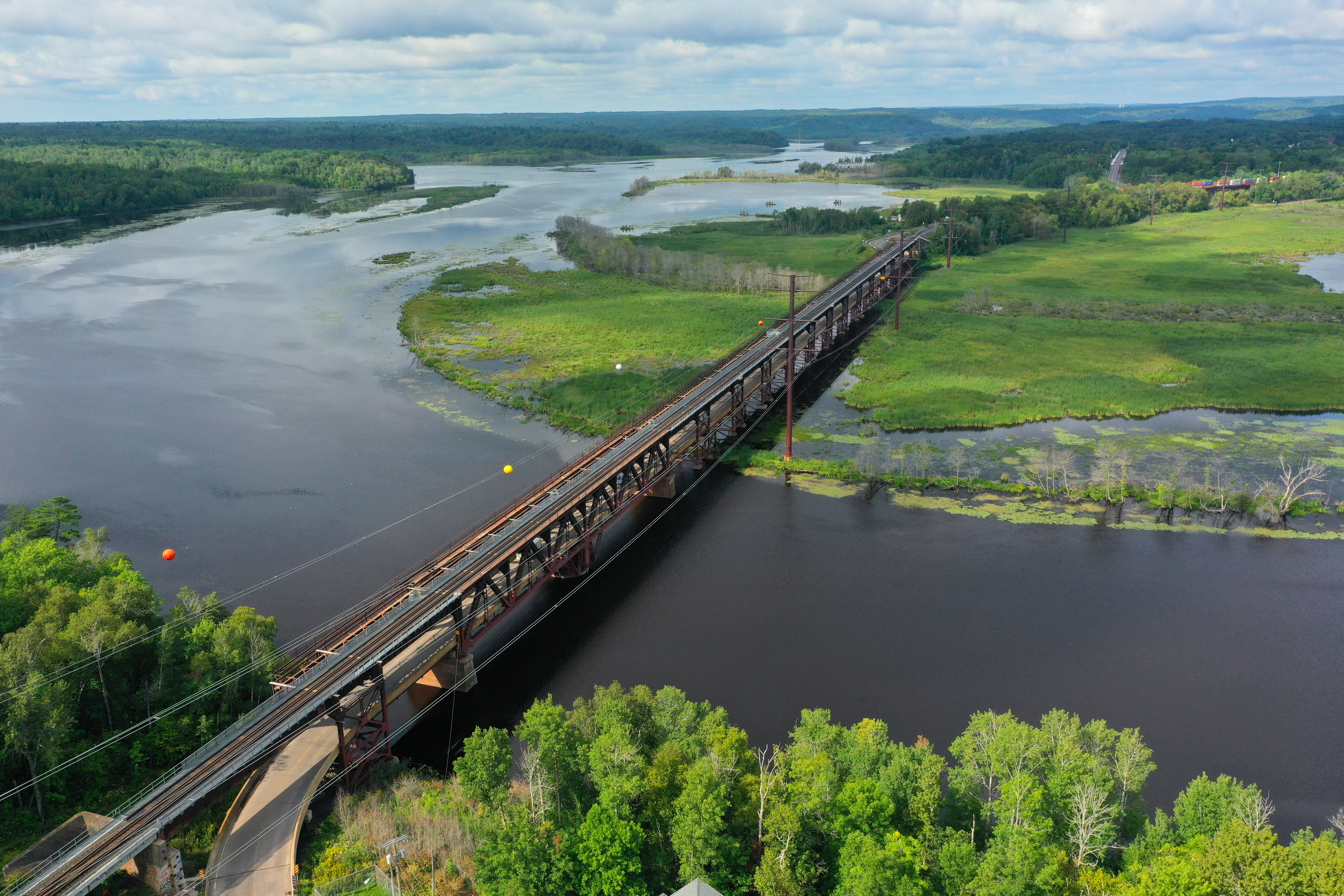
The Oliver Bridge (2020)

Arkansas – Tennessee

- Harahan Bridge (formerly) – through truss bridge across the Mississippi River, connecting West Memphis, Arkansas to Memphis, Tennessee. Built for two railroad tracks and two one-lane "wagonways" cantilevered outside the through truss. Vehicular traffic moved to Memphis & Arkansas Bridge in 1949; though the original decks on both "wagonways" were removed, one of them was rebuilt for pedestrian/bicycle use in 2016.

California

- I Street Bridge, carries two lanes of State Route 16 and two tracks of Amtrak/Union Pacific Railroad between Sacramento and West Sacramento.
- Mare Island Causeway, a vertical-lift bridge that links Mare Island to Vallejo, California, carrying a road and a railroad track.
- Pit River Bridge, across Lake Shasta – 4 lanes of Interstate 5 and also the Union Pacific Railroad.
- San Francisco–Oakland Bay Bridge, carried two tracks of the Key System between San Francisco and Oakland from 1936 until 1963.
- West Branch Feather River Bridge, a Warren deck truss with a top road deck carrying State Route 70 and a bottom rail deck carrying Union Pacific tracks in Butte County.

Florida

- Acosta Bridge – carries six lanes of State Road 13 and two monorail tracks for the JTA Skyway in Jacksonville.

Illinois

- Cherry Avenue Bridge – rail inactive since 2019.
- Lake Street Bridge – road on lower deck, rail on upper deck (CTA Green & Pink lines), bascule bridge.
- Wells Street Bridge – road on lower deck, rail on upper deck (CTA Brown & Purple Line Express), bascule bridge.

Illinois – Iowa

- Fort Madison Toll Bridge – road on upper deck, rail on lower deck.
- Government Bridge – road on lower deck, rail on upper deck, swing-span bridge.
- Keokuk Rail Bridge – disused road on upper deck, rail on lower deck, swing-span bridge above Lock and Dam No. 19.

Illinois – Missouri

- Eads Bridge, across the Mississippi River in St. Louis, Missouri. Opened in 1874, it carries road traffic on the upper deck and the MetroLink (St. Louis) on the lower deck.
- MacArthur Bridge, over the Mississippi, connecting East St. Louis, Illinois and St. Louis, Missouri. It originally had an upper vehicular roadway deck above the railroad deck, which was removed in stages (1981–2010).
- McKinley Bridge – rail removed in 1978.

Indiana – Kentucky

- Kentucky & Indiana Terminal Bridge – truss bridge between Louisville, Kentucky and New Albany, Indiana, over the Ohio River. The road portion closed in 1979, when the roadway collapsed under an overweight truck.

Kentucky – Ohio

- Clay Wade Bailey Bridge/C&O Railroad Bridge – between Newport, Kentucky and Cincinnati, over the Ohio River (Technically, these are two separate bridges, but they are spaced very closely adjacent to each other, and were built on common piers).

Louisiana

- Almonaster Avenue Bridge – bascule drawbridge in New Orleans, Louisiana.
- Florida Avenue Bridge – vertical lift drawbridge in New Orleans, Louisiana.
- Huey P. Long Bridge – Truss bridge in Jefferson Parish, Louisiana.
- Huey P. Long Bridge – Truss bridge in Baton Rouge, Louisiana.
- St. Claude Avenue Bridge – former road and rail bridge in New Orleans. Nowadays it serves automotive and pedestrian traffic.

Maine

- Carlton Bridge – rail on lower deck, carried U.S. Route 1 on the upper deck until 2000.

Maine – New Hampshire

- Sarah Mildred Long Bridge – vertical-lift bridge over the Piscataqua River, connecting Kittery, Maine and Portsmouth, New Hampshire. It is primarily a road bridge, but it includes a rail line which occasionally carries freight to the Portsmouth Naval Shipyard (which is actually in Kittery).

Massachusetts

- Charlestown Bridge, carried the elevated MBTA Orange Line from 1901 to 1975, as well as a streetcar until 1949.
- Harvard Bridge, carried a streetcar over the Charles River between Boston and Cambridge until 1949.
- Longfellow Bridge – four-lane road with the MBTA Red Line in the median of the bridge.
- Summer Street Bridge, carried a streetcar over Fort Point Channel until 1953.

Michigan

- Portage Lake Lift Bridge, connecting Hancock and Houghton. The world's heaviest and largest double deck vertical lift bridge. 4-lane road on upper deck, rail on lower deck (converted to trail). The lower deck was also paved so the bridge could be placed in an intermediate position to allow road traffic only.

Minnesota

- Camp Ripley Bridge
- Washington Avenue Bridge – in Minneapolis across the Mississippi River. Opened in 1965, with rail (Green Line light rail) added in 2011.

Minnesota – Wisconsin

- Oliver Bridge, connecting Duluth, Minnesota and Oliver, Wisconsin. Rail on upper deck, road on lower deck.

Missouri

- Second Hannibal Bridge, in Kansas City, Missouri, across the Missouri River. Opened in 1917, it had a road deck until 1956, when another bridge was built, but the rail deck is presently in use. Evidence of the road deck is still plainly visible.
- ASB Bridge, in Kansas City, Missouri, across the Missouri River. Opened in 1911, it carried vehicular traffic until 1987, when a new span was built. The bridge is unique in that its lower part is a vertical lift drawbridge that can be lifted without interrupting traffic on the upper deck.

New Hampshire – Vermont

- Wells River Bridge – Baltimore truss over the Connecticut River between Woodsville, New Hampshire and Wells River, Vermont. Built in 1903 for road and rail traffic, the bridge became rail only in 1917, and was disused in 2001.

New Jersey – Pennsylvania

- Benjamin Franklin Bridge – Suspension bridge carrying I-676 and PATCO Speedline trains over the Delaware River between Camden, New Jersey and Philadelphia.

New York

- Broadway Bridge – road and the IRT Broadway–Seventh Avenue Line, over the Harlem River.
- Brooklyn Bridge – road bridge that also carried elevated rapid transit service until 1944.
- Manhattan Bridge – road and the B, D, N and Q trains of the New York City Subway.
- Queensboro Bridge – road bridge that also carried elevated rapid transit service until the early 1940s.
- Railroad St. Bridge – Rome, New York – Railroad St. and Mohawk, Adirondack and Northern Railroad share right of way on the bridge.
- Roosevelt Avenue (Flushing River) Bridge – double deck bascule span with Roosevelt Avenue on lower level and the IRT Flushing Line elevated line on upper level over the Flushing River. Completed in 1928.
- Westchester Avenue Bridge – road and the IRT Pelham Line over the Bronx River.
- Williamsburg Bridge – road and the BMT Nassau Street Line of the New York City Subway.
- Whirlpool Rapids Bridge – Niagara Falls, New York – carries a road on the lower level and passenger rail on the upper level between Ontario and New York.

Oregon

- Steel Bridge – a through truss, double lift bridge across the Willamette River in Portland, Oregon, carrying pedestrians, automobiles, buses, rail tracks, and the MAX Light Rail, making it one of the most multi-modal bridges in the world.
- Tilikum Crossing – closed to private automobiles, this crossing in Portland carries pedestrians, buses, the MAX Light Rail and the Portland Streetcar.

Pennsylvania

- Girard Avenue Bridge – carries the SEPTA Route 15 Trolley over the Schuylkill River.

Virginia

- High Bridge (Appomattox River)

Washington (state)

- Homer M. Hadley Memorial Bridge – will carry the 2 Line (Sound Transit).

== Uzbekistan ==
- Afghanistan–Uzbekistan Friendship Bridge – from Termez to Hairatan.
- Rail bridge over the Amu Darya near Hazorasp – opened in March 2004, it is the first bridge between Khorezm and Karakalpakstan. It only has one rail track, which is embedded into the tarmac. The bridge, which is 681m long, is used by cars and trains, one direction at a time. It now doubles the pontoon bridge that was the only link between Khorezm and the rest of Uzbekistan.

== Venezuela ==
- Orinoquia Bridge

== Vietnam ==
Many Vietnamese mainline railway bridges have small paths or roads (for pedestrians, bikes, mopeds & other small vehicles that can fit) attached to one or both of their sides. Some of these paths are wider, which supports larger & heavier vehicles.

This list covers railway bridges in Vietnam that have these paths fixed on their sides (unless stated otherwise). The list may not cover all existing Vietnamese road-rail bridges & may not update future changes to the bridges listed below.

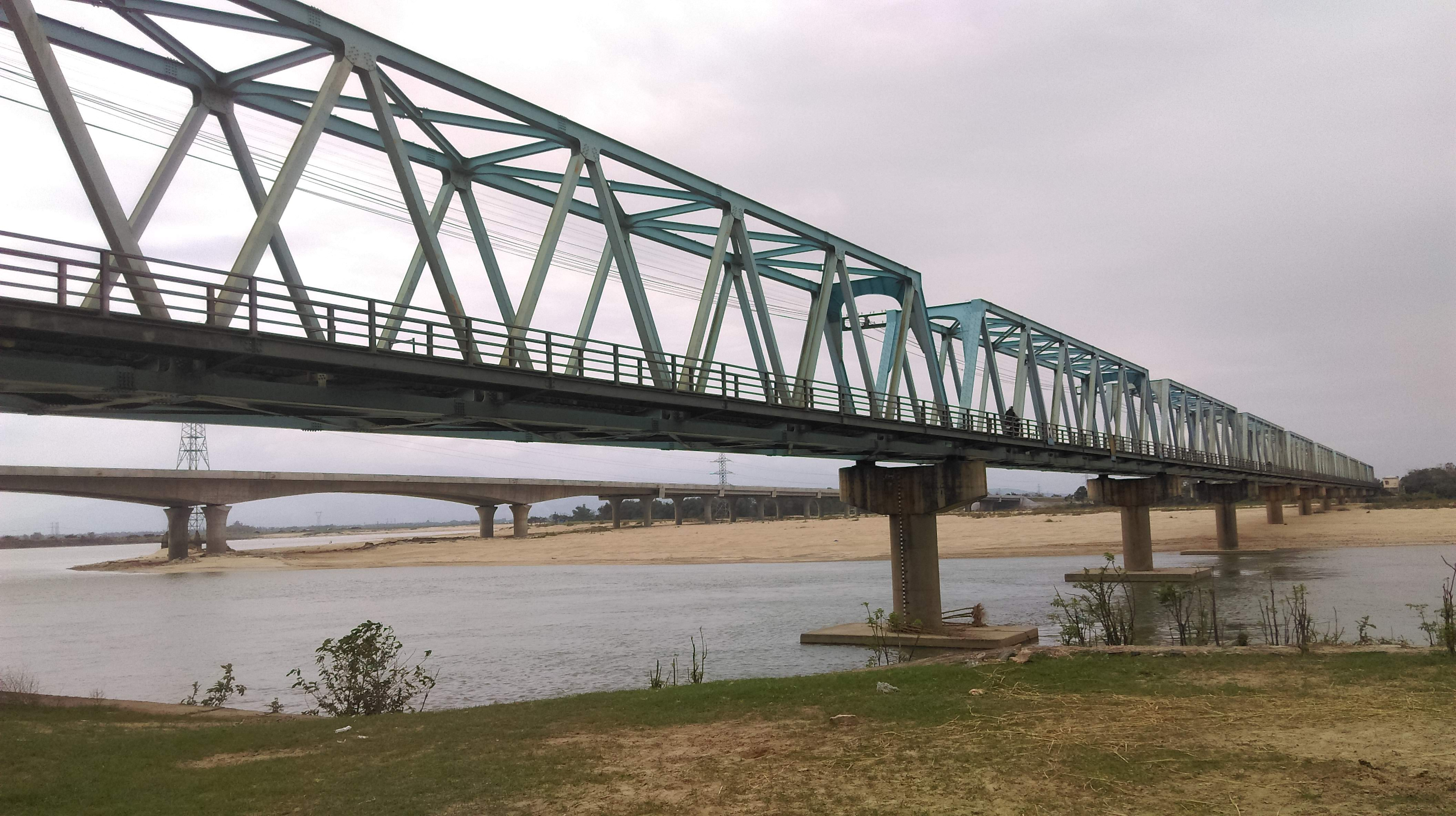
Kỳ Lam Railway Bridge in Quảng Nam, with side paths for mopeds.

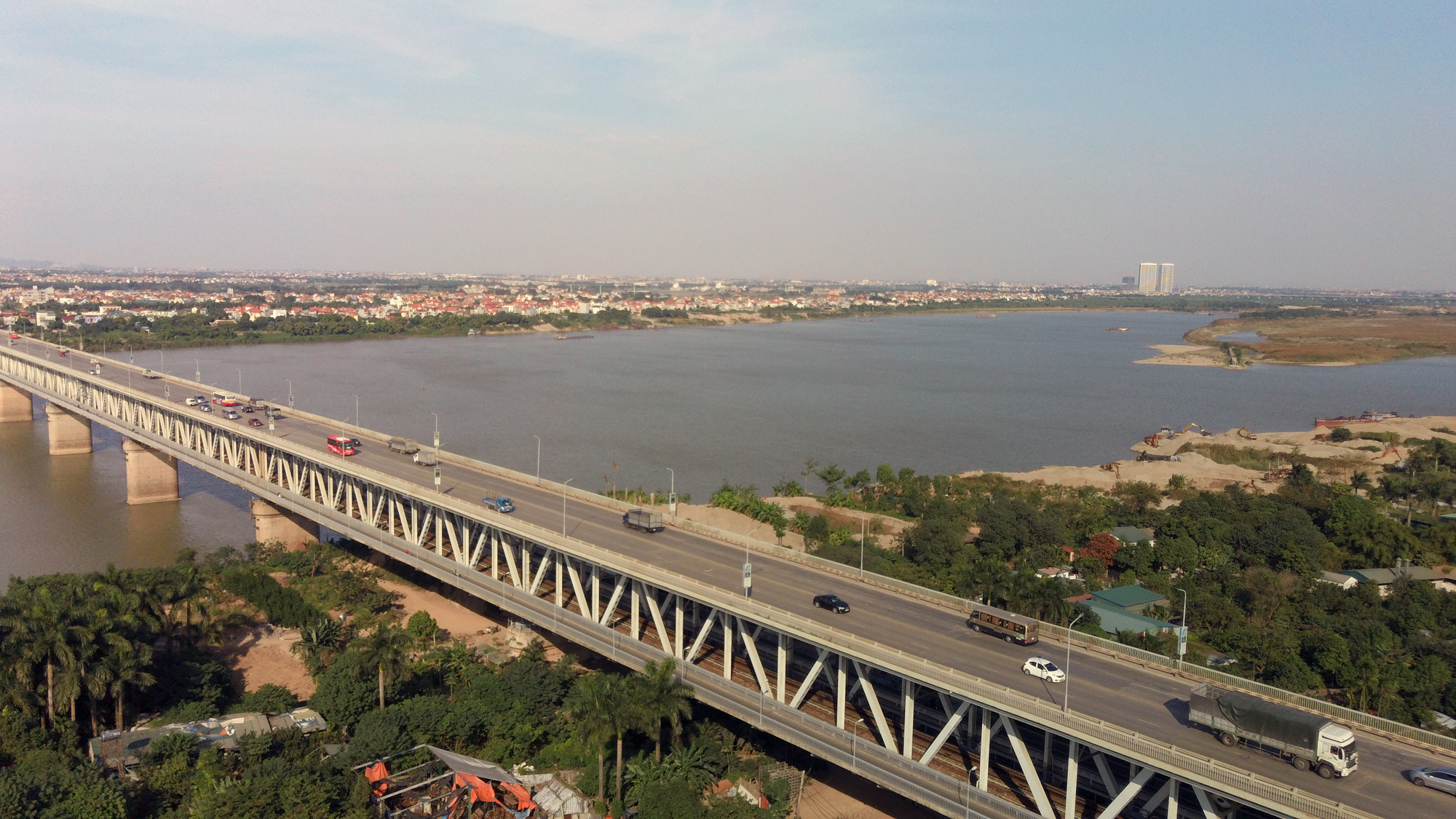
Thăng Long Bridge in Hà Nội, carrying road traffic on its upper deck and rail traffic on its lower deck.

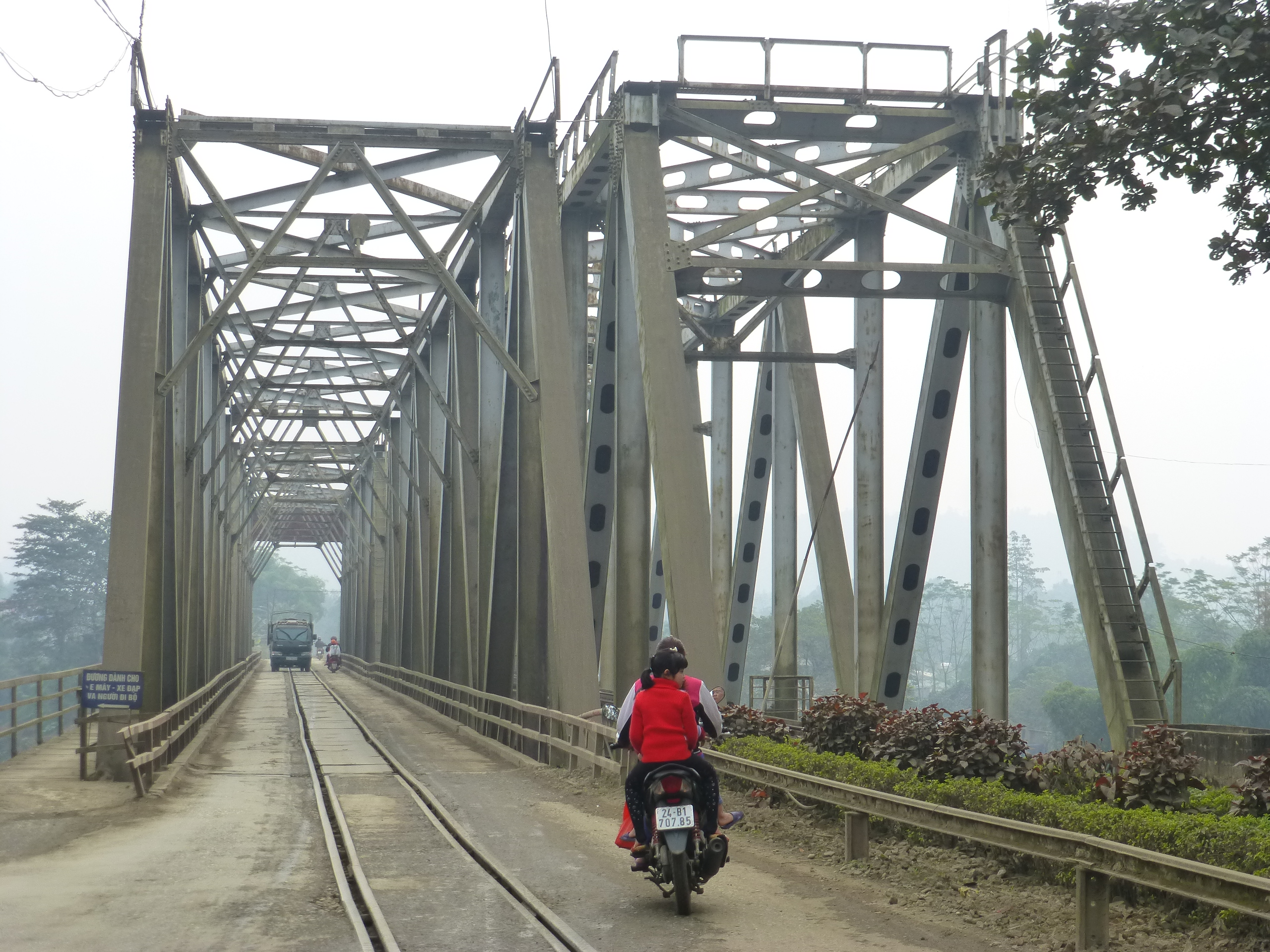
Bến Đền Bridge in Lào Cai.

Bắc Ninh

- Cẩm Lý Bridge – same carriageway for large vehicles (one-way road/Kép–Hạ Long railway).

Đà Nẵng (municipality)

- Kỳ Lam Railway Bridge

Đồng Nai

- Ghềnh Bridge
- Rạch Cát Bridge

Hà Nội (municipality)

- Đuống Bridge – also allows large vehicles under 13 tonnes.
- Long Biên Bridge
- Thăng Long Bridge – Ringway 3 on upper deck & Bắc Hồng–Văn Điển railway on lower deck.

Hải Phòng (municipality)

- Cẩm Giàng Bridge – currently prohibits large vehicles.
- Phú Lương Railway Bridge
- Quay Bridge

Hồ Chí Minh City (municipality)

- Bình Lợi Bridge (1902–2019) – replaced in 2019, dismantled in 2020.

Lào Cai

- Bến Đền Bridge – same carriageway for large vehicles (one-way road/Phố Lu–Pom Hán railway).
- Phố Lu Railway Bridge – similar with the Bến Đền Bridge (under renovation into rail-only since 2025).

Nghệ An

- Yên Xuân Railway Bridge

Ninh Bình

- Ninh Bình Bridge

Phú Thọ

- Việt Trì Bridge – also allows large vehicles under 2 tonnes.

Quảng Trị

- Ga Bridge – formerly also allows large vehicles.
- Long Đại Railway Bridge – same carriageway for large vehicles (one-way road/North–South railway).

Thanh Hóa

- Hàm Rồng Bridge – also allows large vehicles under 10 tonnes.

== Zambia ==
- Kazungula Bridge
- Victoria Falls Bridge

== Zimbabwe ==
=== Current ===
- Victoria Falls Bridge

=== Former ===
- Alfred Beit Bridge (Beitbridge (Zimbabwe) – Musina (South Africa) ) – road traffic moved to nearby Alfred Beit Road Bridge in 1995.

== Temporary ==
During wartime and other emergencies, rail tracks on bridges are sometimes paved to allow road traffic to proceed. Examples include the Ludendorff Bridge at Remagen bridge in Germany.

After a landslide on the Stromeferry road in Scotland in 2012, a 150m section of the parallel railway was paved with rubber tiles to allow road traffic to avoid a 250 km detour.

== Proposed ==
- Bahrain & Qatar – Qatar–Bahrain Friendship Bridge
- Bangladesh – New Kalurghat Bridge
- Democratic Republic of the Congo & Republic of the Congo – Brazzaville–Kinshasa Bridge
- Djibouti & Yemen – Bridge of the Horns
- India & Sri Lanka – Palk Strait Bridge
- Indonesia – Bali Strait Bridge, Sunda Strait Bridge
- Italy – Strait of Messina Bridge
- Latvia – Bridge over the Daugava (Rail Baltica, near Salaspils)
- Portugal – Third Tagus Crossing
- Venezuela – Nigale Bridge
- Vietnam – Cần Thơ 2 Bridge

== Under construction ==
- China – Baijusi Yangtze River Bridge (8-lane highway and CRT line 18)
- China – Changtai Yangtze River Bridge (S30 and Taichang ICR)
- China – Guojiatuo Yangtze River Bridge (8-lane road and CRT line 8)
- China – Humen Road-Railway Bridge (road and Shenzhan HSR)
- China – Libu Yangtze River Road-Railway Bridge (G55 and Jingyue ICR)
- China – Lingang Yangtze River Bridge (road and Chuannan ICR)
- China – Linyu Yangtze River Bridge (road and Line 1 of Luzhou Rail Transit)
- China – Ma'anshan Yangtze River Road-Railway Bridge (6-lane highway and Chaoma ICR)
- China – Taichang Yangtze River Bridge (Ruchang Expressway and Taichang ICR)
- China – Third Tongling Yangtze River Bridge (G3, Hewen HSR and Tongling Rail Transit)
- China – Xihoumen Road-Rail Bridge
- Denmark – New Storstrøm Bridge
- Iran – Persian Gulf Bridge
- Portugal – Ferreirinha Bridge
- Taiwan – Danjiang Bridge (light rail cross)
- Ukraine – Podilskyi Bridge

== See also ==
- List of bridges
- List of road–rail tunnels
- List of bridge–tunnels
- Street running
- Train ferry
