= Nanjing Yangtze River Bridge (disambiguation) =

Nanjing Yangtze River Bridge may refer to:

- Nanjing Yangtze River Bridge, also known as First Nanjing Yangtze Bridge (opened 1968, 160 m longest span)
- Nanjing Baguazhou Yangtze River Bridge, also known as Second Nanjing Yangtze River Bridge (opened 1997, 628 m longest span)
- Nanjing Dashengguan Yangtze River Bridge, also known as Third Nanjing Yangtze Bridge (opened 2005, 648 m longest span)
- Nanjing Qixiashan Yangtze River Bridge, also known as Fourth Nanjing Yangtze River Bridge (opened 2012, 1,418 m longest span)
- Nanjing Jiangxinzhou Yangtze River Bridge, also known as Fifth Nanjing Yangtze River Bridge (opened 2020, 600 m longest span)
- Nanjing Xianxin Yangtze River Bridge (opened 2023, 1,760 m longest span)
