= Ningyang Yangtze River Bridge =

Chinese suspended bridge

Ningyang Yangtze River Bridge 宁扬长江大桥
- Coordinates: 32°14′38″N 119°05′10″E
- Crosses: Yangtze River
- Locale: Nanjing and Yangzhou
- Other name: Longtan Yangtze River Bridge

Characteristics
- Design: Suspension bridge
- Total length: 4,920 m (16,142 ft)
- Height: 237.5 m (779 ft) (south tower); 235.5 m (773 ft) (north tower)
- Longest span: 1,560 m (5,118 ft)

History
- Constructed by: China Road and Bridge Corporation (CRBC)
- Construction start: April 30, 2020
- Construction end: January 1, 2025

Location
- Interactive map of Ningyang Yangtze River Bridge

The Ningyang Yangtze River Bridge (Chinese: 宁扬长江大桥), previously named the Longtan Yangtze River Bridge (Chinese: 龙潭长江大桥) is a suspension bridge over the Yangtze River in Nanjing, China.

== Description ==
The Bridge is a two-way, six-lane steel box girder suspension bridge in Jiangsu Province, China, that opened to traffic on January 1, 2025. With a main span of 1,560 meters and a designed speed of 100 km/h, it connects the Longtan Port area to the Nanjing metropolitan area's expressway network, significantly improving the region's road infrastructure and travel time between Longtan and Yizheng.

== See also ==
- Bridges and tunnels across the Yangtze River
- List of bridges in China
- List of longest suspension bridge spans
- List of tallest bridges
- Nanjing Yangtze River Bridge
- Nanjing Qixiashan Yangtze River Bridge
- Nanjing Xianxin Yangtze River Bridge
