= Runyang Yangtze River Bridge =

Runyang Bridge 润扬长江大桥
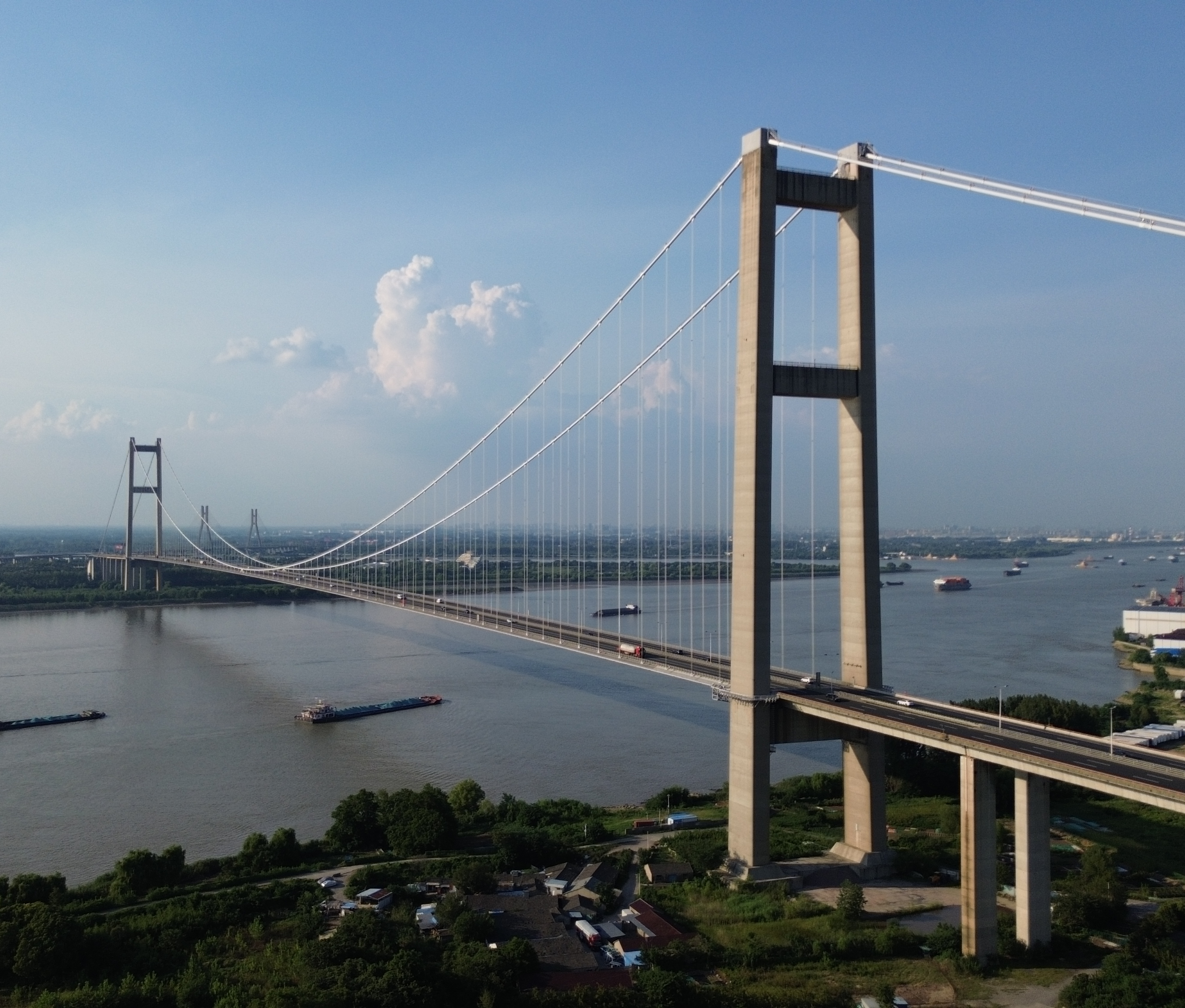
- View of the bridge from south
- Coordinates: 32.220898°N 119.357615°E
- Carries: G4011 Yangzhou–Liyang Expressway
- Crosses: Yangtze River
- Locale: Jiangsu

Characteristics
- Design: South Suspension bridge North Cable-stayed bridge
- Total length: 7.21 kilometres (4 mi)
- Height: 210.4 metres (690 ft)
- Longest span: South 1,490 metres (4,890 ft); North 406 metres (1,332 ft)

History
- Opened: April 30, 2005

Location
- Interactive map of Runyang Bridge

The Runyang Yangtze River Bridge (simplified Chinese: 润扬长江大桥; traditional Chinese: 潤揚長江大橋; pinyin: Rùnyáng Chángjiāng Dàqiáo; Wu: Nye-yaan saon-gaon du-jiau) is a large bridge complex that crosses the Yangtze River in Jiangsu Province, China, downstream of Nanjing. The complex consists of two major bridges that link Runzhou District in Zhenjiang on the south bank of the river and Yangzhou on the north. The bridge is part of the Yangzhou–Liyang Expressway. Construction of the bridge complex began in October 2000 and was completed ahead of schedule. The bridge cost 5.8 billion Yuan (about US$700 million). The complex opened to traffic on April 30, 2005. The total length of the project is about 35.66 kilometres (22.16 mi) and the length of the bridge complex is 7.21 kilometres (4 mi). In between the two bridges is the island of Shiyezhou.

Prior to the bridge's completion, round-the-clock ferry services operated across the river. It took about 40 minutes to reach the Zhenjiang Railway Station from Yangzhou. To this day, this nearby, round-the-clock ferry service operates across the river. The fee is approximately 15 yuan per small car, with a wait time of about 5 minutes. Cars and trucks drive directly onto the ferry boats before departure. Some locals estimate the ferries more quickly connect the city centers of Zhenjiang and Yangzhou.

== South bridge ==
The south bridge is a suspension bridge with a main span of 1,490 metres (4,888 ft). Upon its completion in 2005 it became the third longest suspension bridge span in the world and the largest in China. With the opening of the Xihoumen Bridge in 2007, it became the second longest span in China. It is now the ninth longest in the world. The towers are 215 metres (705 ft) above water level. The two approach spans are not suspended. The main span of the bridge consists of a streamlined orthotropic steel box girder that is 3 metres (10 ft) in depth. The width of the deck is 39.2 metres (129 ft), accommodating 6 traffic lanes and a narrow walkway at each outside edge for maintenance. The height clearance for river navigation is about 50 metres (164 ft).

Another planned suspension bridge across the Qiongzhou Strait in China, will be larger than the south bridge, spanning between 2,000 and 2,500 metres.

== North bridge ==
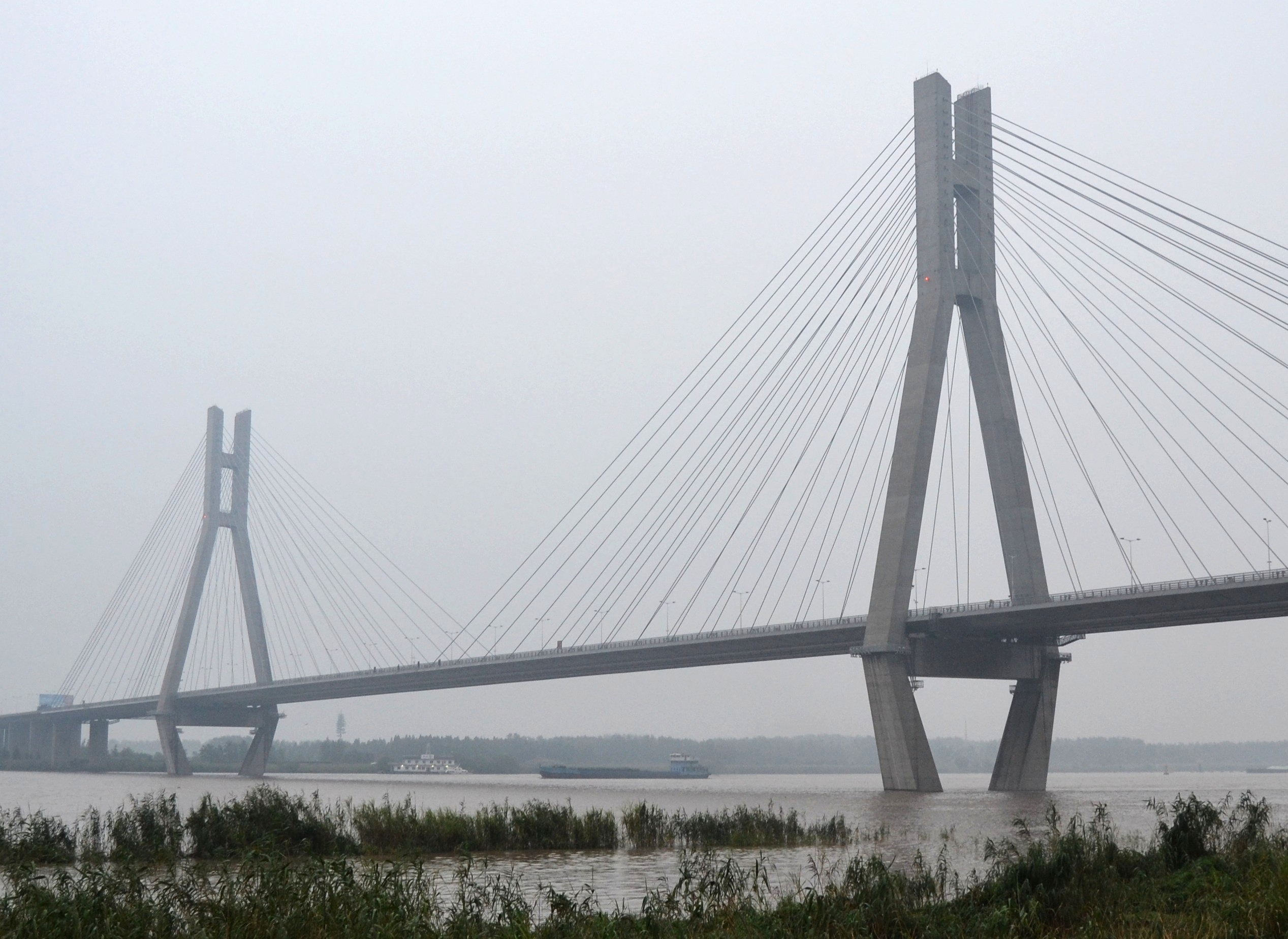
North bridge

The north bridge is a cable-stayed bridge with a main span of 406 metres (1,332 ft) with towers 150 metres (492 ft) above water level.

== See also ==
- Bridges and tunnels across the Yangtze River
- List of bridges in China
- List of longest suspension bridge spans
- List of tallest bridges
- Nanjing Yangtze River Bridge
- Nanjing Qixiashan Yangtze River Bridge
- Nanjing Xianxin Yangtze River Bridge
