= List of tallest bridges =

The Changtai Yangtze River Bridge.

This list of tallest bridges includes bridges with a structural height of at least 200 metres (660 ft). The structural height of a bridge is the maximum vertical distance from the uppermost part of a bridge, such as the top of a bridge tower, to the lowermost exposed part of the bridge, where its piers, towers, or mast pylons emerge from the surface of the ground or water. Structural height is different from deck height, which measures the maximum vertical distance between the bridge deck (the road bed of a bridge) and the ground or water surface beneath the bridge span. A separate list of highest bridges ranks bridges by deck height.

There may be differences between the various heights given, as the heights do not always include the same elements depending on the information provided by the design offices. In the lower part, the level may be the water level or the highest water level, the lower part of the foundation header, or the upper part of the tower base. In the upper part, the level may be the concrete or steel structure of the tower, the axis or IP (Intersection Point) of the main cable, or the highest structural or architectural elevation. The 1915 Çanakkale Bridge gains 16 metres (52 ft) with its tower-top ornament.

== Structural height and deck height ==
The difference between tall and high bridges can be explained in part because some of the highest bridges are built across deep valleys or gorges. For example, the Huajiang Canyon Bridge is the highest bridge in the world, but it is not in the top 20 tallest bridges. This bridge spans a deep river gorge. The bridge's two towers, built on either rim of the gorge, are 262 metres (860 ft) tall, but due to the depth of the river gorge, the deck height of the Huajiang Canyon Bridge is 625 metres (2,051 ft).

The Millau Viaduct is a cable-stayed bridge that is both tall (in structural height) and high (in deck height). The tallest Millau Viaduct tower is situated near the valley floor, which gives the viaduct a structural height of 336 metres (1,102 ft), and a deck height of 277 metres (909 ft) above the valley floor.

== Completed ==
Photo	Name	Structural height metres (feet)	Main span metres (feet)	Opened	Design	Location	Ref.
	Changtai Yangtze River Bridge	352 m (1,155 ft)	1,176 m (3,858 ft)	2025	Cable-stayed	China; Changzhou–Taizhou, Jiangsu; 32°00′31″N 119°58′06″E	
	Millau Viaduct	336.4 m (1,104 ft)	342 m (1,122 ft)	2004	Cable-stayed	France; Millau, Aveyron; 44°04′49″N 3°01′21″E	
	Pingtang Bridge	332 m (1,089 ft)	550 m (1,800 ft)	2019	Cable-stayed	China; Pingtang, Guizhou; 25°47′07″N 107°03′24″E	
	Husutong Yangtze River Bridge	330 m (1,080 ft)	1,092 m (3,583 ft)	2020	Cable-stayed	China; Nantong–Suzhou, Jiangsu; 32°00′16″N 120°42′48″E	
	1915 Çanakkale Bridge	324.1 m (1,063 ft)	2,023 m (6,637 ft)	2022	Suspension	Turkey; Gelibolu–Lapseki (Dardanelles); 40°20′24″N 26°38′12″E	
	Yavuz Sultan Selim Bridge	322 m (1,056 ft)	1,408 m (4,619 ft)	2016	Suspension with cable-stayed	Turkey; Istanbul, Bosphorus; 41°12′11″N 29°06′42″E	
	Russky Bridge	319.1 m (1,047 ft)	1,104 m (3,622 ft)	2012	Cable-stayed	Russia; Vladivostok–Russky Island; 43°03′49″N 131°54′29″E	
	Sutong Bridge	300.4 m (986 ft)	1,088 m (3,570 ft)	2008	Cable-stayed	China; Suzhou–Nantong, Jiangsu; 31°46′38″N 120°59′42″E	
	Yunwu Bridge	300 m (980 ft)	480 m (1,570 ft)	2021	Cable-stayed	China; Guiding County, Guizhou; 26°10′48″N 107°09′39″E	
	Xindu Jinsha River Bridge	297.5 m (976 ft)	680 m (2,230 ft)	2026	Cable-stayed	China; Pingshan County, Sichuan–Suijiang County, Yunnan; 28°40′06″N 103°51′48″E	
	Akashi Kaikyo Bridge	297 m (974 ft)	1,991 m (6,532 ft)	1998	Suspension	Japan; Kobe–Awaji Island, Hyōgo; 34°36′59″N 135°01′13″E	
	Stonecutters Bridge	293.5 m (963 ft)	1,018 m (3,340 ft)	2009	Cable-stayed	China; Tsing Yi–Stonecutters Island, Hong Kong; 22°19′34″N 114°07′06″E	
	Zunyu Expressway Xiang River Bridge	288 m (945 ft)	560 m (1,840 ft)	2021	Cable-stayed	China; Bozhou–Weng'an County, Guizhou; 27°26′52″N 107°15′52″E	
	Wujiang Bridge Mozhai	287 m (942 ft)	296 m (971 ft)	2024	Extradossed	China; Pengshui County, Chongqing; 29°13′46″N 108°10′23″E	
	Chishi Bridge	286.6 m (940 ft)	380 m (1,250 ft)	2016	Cable-stayed	China; Yizhang County, Hunan; 25°32′06″N 113°10′41″E	
	Qingshan Yangtze River Bridge	279.5 m (917 ft)	938 m (3,077 ft)	2021	Cable-stayed	China; Wuhan, Hubei; 30°40′47″N 114°28′00″E	
	Nanjing Xianxin Yangtze River Bridge	277.3 m (910 ft)	1,760 m (5,770 ft)	2025	Suspension	China; Nanjing, Jiangsu; 32°10′55″N 118°53′40″E	
	Wuxue Yangtze River Bridge	275 m (902 ft)	808 m (2,651 ft)	2021	Cable-stayed	China; Wuxue–Yangxin County, Hubei; 29°50′30″N 115°30′07″E	
	Yi Sun-sin Bridge	270 m (890 ft)	1,545 m (5,069 ft)	2012	Suspension	South Korea; Gwangyang–Yeosu, South Jeolla Province; 34°54′21″N 127°42′19″E	
	Shenzhen–Zhongshan Bridge	270 m (890 ft)	1,666 m (5,466 ft)	2024	Suspension	China; Shenzhen–Zhongshan, Guangdong; 22°33′20″N 113°43′34″E	
	Duge Bridge	269 m (883 ft)	720 m (2,360 ft)	2016	Cable-stayed	China; Xuanwei, Yunnan–Shuicheng, Guizhou; 26°23′08″N 104°40′26″E	
	Jingyue Yangtze River Bridge	265.5 m (871 ft)	816 m (2,677 ft)	2010	Cable-stayed	China; Jianli, Hubei–Yueyang, Hunan; 29°32′38″N 113°13′23″E	
	Longli Bridge	265 m (869 ft)	528 m (1,732 ft)	2024	Cable-stayed	China; Longli County, Guizhou; 26°23′09″N 106°50′59″E	
	Huangmaohai Bridge	262.8 m (862 ft)	720 m (2,360 ft)	2024	Cable-stayed	China; Zhuhai–Taishan, Guangdong; 22°00′37″N 113°05′40″E	
	Second Wuhu Yangtze River Bridge	262.5 m (861 ft)	806 m (2,644 ft)	2017	Cable-stayed	China; Wuhu, Anhui; 31°14′06″N 118°07′45″E	
	Huajiang Canyon Bridge	262 m (860 ft)	1,420 m (4,660 ft)	2025	Suspension	China; Guanling County–Zhenfeng County, Guizhou; 25°42′17″N 105°35′17″E	
	Gujin Chishui River Bridge	261 m (856 ft)	575 m (1,886 ft)	2024	Cable-stayed	China; Gulin County, Sichuan–Jinsha County, Guizhou; 27°45′11″N 105°58′56″E	
	Yachi River Bridge	258.2 m (847 ft)	800 m (2,600 ft)	2016	Cable-stayed	China; Qingzhen, Guizhou; 26°50′57″N 106°08′15″E	
	Nansha Bridge (East span)	256.4 m (841 ft)	1,688 m (5,538 ft)	2019	Suspension	China; Nansha–Dongguan, Guangdong; 22°53′05″N 113°33′55″E	
	Gaolangang Bridge	254.7 m (836 ft)	700 m (2,300 ft)	2024	Cable-stayed	China; Zhuhai–Taishan, Guangdong; 22°01′16″N 113°07′16″E	
	Great Belt East Bridge	254 m (833 ft)	1,624 m (5,328 ft)	1998	Suspension	Denmark; Korsør–Sprogø, Region Zealand; 55°20′30″N 11°02′09″E	
	Lingang Yangtze River Bridge	253.8 m (833 ft)	522 m (1,713 ft)	2023	Cable-stayed	China; Yibin, Sichuan; 28°46′44″N 104°43′34″E	
	Nanmengxi Bridge	253.5 m (832 ft)	360 m (1,180 ft)	2024	Cable-stayed	China; Jinping County, Guizhou; 26°33′27″N 108°51′08″E	
	Third Tongling Yangtze River Bridge	253.5 m (832 ft)	988 m (3,241 ft)	2025	Suspension with cable-stayed	China; Tongling, Anhui; 30°51′02″N 117°43′28″E	
	Bianyuzhou Yangtze River Railway Bridge	252 m (827 ft)	672 m (2,205 ft)	2021	Cable-stayed	China; Jiujiang, Jiangxi–Huangmei County, Hubei; 29°44′25″N 115°51′32″E	
	Jiayu Yangtze River Bridge	251.41 m (824.8 ft)	920 m (3,020 ft)	2019	Cable-stayed	China; Jiayu County–Honghu, Hubei; 30°03′12″N 113°58′01″E	
	Third Wanzhou Yangtze River Bridge	248.12 m (814.0 ft)	730 m (2,400 ft)	2019	Cable-stayed	China; Wanzhou, Chongqing; 30°47′25″N 108°23′49″E	
	Zangkejiang Bridge	248.1 m (814 ft)	1,080 m (3,540 ft)	2025	Suspension	China; Shuicheng–Pu'an County, Guizhou; 26°09′59″N 105°06′45″E	
	Liuguanghe Xiqian Expressway Bridge	248 m (814 ft)	580 m (1,900 ft)	2017	Cable-stayed	China; Xiuwen–Qianxi, Guizhou; 27°04′41″N 106°24′06″E	
	Zhongzhou Yangtze River Bridge	247.5 m (812 ft)	460 m (1,510 ft)	2009	Cable-stayed	China; Zhong County, Chongqing; 30°14′N 108°01′E	
	Gongshuihe Bridge	245 m (804 ft)	400 m (1,300 ft)	2014	Cable-stayed	China; Xuan'en County, Hubei; 29°56′35″N 109°25′41″E	
	Jiujiang Yangtze River Expressway Bridge	244.3 m (802 ft)	818 m (2,684 ft)	2013	Cable-stayed	China; Jiujiang, Jiangxi–Huangmei County, Hubei; 29°43′21″N 115°54′30″E	
	Yangsigang Yangtze River Bridge	243.9 m (800 ft)	1,700 m (5,600 ft)	2019	Suspension	China; Wuhan, Hubei; 30°30′37″N 114°15′24″E	
	Chajiaotan Bridge	243.5 m (799 ft)	1,200 m (3,900 ft)	2019	Suspension	China; Xishui County, Guizhou–Gulin County, Sichuan; 28°09′57″N 106°08′07″E	
	Chizhou Yangtze River Bridge	243 m (797 ft)	828 m (2,717 ft)	2019	Cable-stayed	China; Chizhou–Tongling, Anhui; 30°41′51″N 117°20′44″E	
	E’dong Bridge	242.5 m (796 ft)	926 m (3,038 ft)	2010	Cable-stayed	China; Huangshi, Hubei; 30°15′38″N 115°04′20″E	
	Mezcala Bridge	242 m (794 ft)	311 m (1,020 ft)	1993	Cable-stayed	Mexico; Mártir de Cuilapán–Tepecoacuilco de Trujano, Guerrero; 17°56′13″N 99°22′09″W	
	Osman Gazi Bridge	241.9 m (794 ft)	1,550 m (5,090 ft)	2016	Suspension	Turkey; Dilovası–Altınova, Gulf of İzmit; 40°45′18″N 29°30′56″E	
	Ningyang Yangtze River Bridge	237.5 m (779 ft)	1,560 m (5,120 ft)	2025	Suspension	China; Nanjing–Yangzhou, Jiangsu; 32°14′38″N 119°05′10″E	
	Qingshui River Bridge	236 m (774 ft)	1,130 m (3,710 ft)	2015	Suspension	China; Kaiyang County–Weng'an County, Guizhou; 27°01′46″N 107°11′24″E	
	Baijusi Yangtze River Bridge	236 m (774 ft)	660 m (2,170 ft)	2022	Cable-stayed	China; Dadukou District–Banan District, Chongqing; 29°25′54″N 106°30′25″E	
	Shishou Yangtze River Bridge	234 m (768 ft)	820 m (2,690 ft)	2019	Cable-stayed	China; Shishou, Hubei; 29°47′21″N 112°29′36″E	
	Wuhan Zhuankou Yangtze River Bridge	233.7 m (767 ft)	760 m (2,490 ft)	2017	Cable-stayed	China; Wuhan, Hubei; 30°26′04″N 114°11′09″E	
	Incheon Bridge	230.5 m (756 ft)	800 m (2,600 ft)	2009	Cable-stayed	South Korea; Incheon–Yeongjongdo; 37°24′50″N 126°34′00″E	
	Jin'an Bridge	230 m (750 ft)	1,386 m (4,547 ft)	2020	Suspension	China; Lijiang, Yunnan; 26°49′N 100°26′E	
	Nanjing Qixiashan Yangtze River Bridge	229.4 m (753 ft)	1,418 m (4,652 ft)	2012	Suspension	China; Nanjing, Jiangsu; 32°10′40″N 118°56′26″E	
	Rio–Antirrio Bridge	227.5 m (746 ft)	560 m (1,840 ft)	2004	Cable-stayed	Greece; Rio, Peloponnese–Antirrio, Aetolia-Acarnania; 38°19′17″N 21°46′22″E	
	Golden Gate Bridge	227.4 m (746 ft)	1,280 m (4,200 ft)	1937	Suspension	United States; San Francisco–Marin County, California; 37°49′11″N 122°28′43″W	
	Second Fengdu Yangtze River Bridge	227.1 m (745 ft)	680 m (2,230 ft)	2017	Cable-stayed	China; Fengdu County, Chongqing; 29°52′05″N 107°42′28″E	
	Xiamen Zhangzhou Bridge	227 m (745 ft)	780 m (2,560 ft)	2013	Cable-stayed	China; Xiamen–Zhangzhou, Fujian; 24°27′23″N 117°56′58″E	
	Nanjimen Yangtze River bridge	227 m (745 ft)	480 m (1,570 ft)	2023	Cable-stayed	China; Chongqing; 29°32′46″N 106°33′53″E	
	Huangpu Bridge	226.1 m (742 ft)	383 m (1,257 ft)	2008	Cable-stayed	China; Guangzhou, Guangdong; 23°04′18″N 113°28′32″E	
	El Carrizo Bridge	226 m (741 ft)	217 m (712 ft)	2013	Cable-stayed	Mexico; Concordia, Sinaloa; 23°30′58″N 105°47′36″W	
	Xiangshan Harbor Bridge	225.5 m (740 ft)	688 m (2,257 ft)	2012	Cable-stayed	China; Ningbo–Xiangshan County, Zhejiang; 29°37′25″N 121°48′33″E	
	Xiangshan Harbor Railway Bridge	225.5 m (740 ft)	688 m (2,257 ft)		Cable-stayed	China; Ningbo–Xiangshan County, Zhejiang; 29°37′27″N 121°48′37″E	
	San Marcos Bridge	225 m (738 ft)	180 m (590 ft)	2013	Concrete box girder	Mexico; Xicotepec–Tlacuilotepec, Puebla; 20°20′23″N 97°57′37″W	
	Yangpu Bridge	223 m (732 ft)	602 m (1,975 ft)	1993	Cable-stayed	China; Shanghai; 31°15′27″N 121°32′29″E	
	Langqi Min River Bridge	223 m (732 ft)	680 m (2,230 ft)	2013	Cable-stayed	China; Fuzhou, Fujian; 26°05′57″N 119°32′13″E	
	Chibi Yangtze River Bridge	223 m (732 ft)	720 m (2,360 ft)	2021	Cable-stayed	China; Chibi–Honghu, Hubei; 29°51′31″N 113°34′14″E	
	Zolotoy Bridge	222.4 m (730 ft)	737 m (2,418 ft)	2012	Cable-stayed	Russia; Vladivostok; 43°06′31″N 131°53′46″E	
	Tatara Bridge	220 m (720 ft)	890 m (2,920 ft)	1999	Cable-stayed	Japan; Ikuchijima, Hiroshima–Ōmishima Island, Ehime; 34°15′35″N 133°03′54″E	
	Gordie Howe International Bridge	220 m (720 ft)	853 m (2,799 ft)	2026	Cable-stayed	United States–Canada; Detroit, Michigan–Windsor, Ontario; 42°17′15″N 83°05′52″W	
	Badong Yangtze River Bridge	218 m (715 ft)	388 m (1,273 ft)	2005	Cable-stayed	China; Badong County, Hubei; 31°02′55″N 110°19′42″E	
	Wangdong Yangtze River Bridge	217 m (712 ft)	638 m (2,093 ft)	2016	Cable-stayed	China; Wangjiang County–Dongzhi County, Anhui; 30°05′53″N 116°47′35″E	
	Qianjiang Bridge	216 m (709 ft)	618 m (2,028 ft)	2024	Cable-stayed	China; Laibin–Wuxuan, Guangxi; 23°42′10″N 109°32′29″E	
	Guozigou Bridge	215.5 m (707 ft)	360 m (1,180 ft)	2011	Cable-stayed	China; Huocheng County, Xinjiang; 44°28′15″N 81°08′25″E	
	Nanjing Dashengguan Yangtze River Bridge	215 m (705 ft)	648 m (2,126 ft)	2005	Cable-stayed	China; Nanjing, Jiangsu; 31°58′12″N 118°38′29″E	
	Fuxing Yangtze River Bridge	215 m (705 ft)	1,208 m (3,963 ft)	2026	Suspension	China; Yunyang County, Chongqing; 30°55′33″N 108°46′24″E	
	Wuzuohe Bridge	214.6 m (704 ft)	380 m (1,250 ft)	2015	Cable-stayed	China; Nayong County–Zhijin County, Guizhou; 26°49′52″N 105°35′19″E	
	Shenzhong Corridor Zhongshan Bridge	213.5 m (700 ft)	580 m (1,900 ft)	2024	Cable-stayed	China; Zhongshan, Guangdong; 22°42′01″N 113°05′48″E	
	Xupu Bridge	212.5 m (697 ft)	590 m (1,940 ft)	1997	Cable-stayed	China; Shanghai; 31°07′47″N 121°27′52″E	
	Shanghai Yangtze River Bridge	212.3 m (697 ft)	730 m (2,400 ft)	2009	Cable-stayed	China; Shanghai–Chongming County; 31°26′04″N 121°44′37″E	
	Tongling Yangtze River Road-railway Bridge	212 m (696 ft)	630 m (2,070 ft)	2015	Cable-stayed	China; Tongling, Anhui; 31°05′01″N 117°58′11″E	
	Fengjie Yangtze River Bridge	211.6 m (694 ft)	460 m (1,510 ft)	2005	Cable-stayed	China; Fengjie, Chongqing; 31°01′13″N 109°28′51″E	
	Xihoumen Bridge	211.3 m (693 ft)	1,650 m (5,410 ft)	2009	Suspension	China; Zhoushan, Zhejiang; 30°03′42″N 121°54′55″E	
	Runyang Yangtze River Bridge	210.4 m (690 ft)	1,490 m (4,890 ft)	2005	Suspension	China; Zhenjiang–Yangzhou, Jiangsu; 32°12′26″N 119°21′49″E	
	Xianshen River Bridge	210 m (690 ft)	136 m (446 ft)	2009	Extradossed	China; Zezhou County, Shanxi; 35°14′N 112°46′E	
	Minpu Bridge	210 m (690 ft)	708 m (2,323 ft)	2010	Cable-stayed	China; Shanghai; 31°03′10″N 121°28′37″E	
	Huangyi Yangtze River Bridge	210 m (690 ft)	520 m (1,710 ft)	2012	Cable-stayed	China; Luzhou, Sichuan; 28°53′42″N 105°32′54″E	
	Anqing Yangtze River Railway Bridge	210 m (690 ft)	580 m (1,900 ft)	2015	Cable-stayed	China; Anqing–Chizhou, Anhui; 30°34′20″N 117°14′55″E	
	Fuma Yangtze River Bridge	210 m (690 ft)	1,050 m (3,440 ft)	2017	Suspension	China; Wanzhou, Chongqing; 30°50′04″N 108°28′09″E	
	Queensferry Crossing	210 m (690 ft)	650 m (2,130 ft)	2017	Cable-stayed	Scotland; Edinburgh–Fife, Scotland; 56°00′17″N 3°24′45″W	
	Hengmen West Bridge	210 m (690 ft)	390 m (1,280 ft)	2024	Cable-stayed	China; Zhongshan, Guangdong; 22°35′20″N 113°27′24″W	
	Erqi Yangtze River Bridge	209 m (686 ft)	616 m (2,021 ft)	2011	Cable-stayed	China; Wuhan, Hubei; 30°37′39″N 114°20′31″E	
	Pengxihe Bridge	208 m (682 ft)	316 m (1,037 ft)	2008	Cable-stayed	China; Yunyang County, Chongqing; 30°58′38″N 108°42′20″E	
	Kangbo Yangtze River Bridge	208 m (682 ft)	420 m (1,380 ft)	2013	Cable-stayed	China; Hejiang County, Sichuan; 28°50′41″N 105°47′57″E	
	Xijiang Rail Bridge	208 m (682 ft)	600 m (2,000 ft)	2021	Cable-stayed	China; Jiangmen, Guangdong; 22°42′01″N 113°05′48″E	
	Tongzihe Bridge Jinrentong	208 m (682 ft)	965 m (3,166 ft)	2024	Suspension	China; Renhuai, Guizhou; 28°02′17″N 106°32′18″E	
	Yongchuan Yangtze River Bridge	207.4 m (680 ft)	608 m (1,995 ft)	2014	Cable-stayed	China; Yongchuan–Jiangjin, Chongqing; 29°02′38″N 105°53′02″E	
	Dafosi Bridge	206.7 m (678 ft)	450 m (1,480 ft)	2001	Cable-stayed	China; Chongqing; 29°36′22″N 106°34′57″E	
	Tsing Ma Bridge	206 m (676 ft)	1,377 m (4,518 ft)	1997	Suspension	China; Tsing Yi–Ma Wan, Hong Kong; 22°21′05″N 114°04′27″E	
	Verrazzano–Narrows Bridge	205.9 m (676 ft)	1,298 m (4,259 ft)	1964	Suspension	United States; New York City, New York; 40°36′23″N 74°02′44″W	
	Lizhi Wujiang Bridge	204.8 m (672 ft)	320 m (1,050 ft)	2012	Cable-stayed	China; Fuling, Chongqing; 29°40′20″N 107°23′1″E	
	Baling River Bridge	204.5 m (671 ft)	1,088 m (3,570 ft)	2009	Suspension	China; Guanling County, Guizhou; 25°57′41″N 105°37′49″E	
	Atlantic Bridge, Panama	204.5 m (671 ft)	530 m (1,740 ft)	2019	Cable-stayed	Panama; Colón, Colón Province; 9°18′29″N 79°55′08″W	
	Rongshan Yangtze River Bridge	204 m (669 ft)	530 m (1,740 ft)	2024	Cable-stayed	China; Hejiang County, Sichuan; 28°50′31″N 105°54′01″E	
	Yinzhouhu Bridge	203.6 m (668 ft)	530 m (1,740 ft)	2023	Cable-stayed	China; Jiangmen, Guangdong; 22°25′4″N 113°4′11″E	
	Øresund Bridge	203.5 m (668 ft)	490 m (1,610 ft)	2000	Cable-stayed	Denmark–Sweden; Copenhagen–Malmö; 55°34′35″N 12°49′18″E	
	Ulsan Bridge	203 m (666 ft)	1,150 m (3,770 ft)	2015	Suspension	South Korea; Ulsan; 35°30′42″N 129°23′29″E	
	Wufengshan Yangtze River Bridge	203 m (666 ft)	1,092 m (3,583 ft)	2020	Suspension	China; Zhenjiang, Jiangsu; 32°13′37″N 119°40′30″E	
	Second Dongting Lake Bridge	203 m (666 ft)	1,480 m (4,860 ft)	2018	Suspension	China; Yueyang, Hunan; 29°25′25″N 113°07′29″E	
	Pont de Normandie	202.7 m (665 ft)	856 m (2,808 ft)	1995	Cable-stayed	France; Le Havre, Seine-Maritime–Honfleur, Calvados; 49°25′56″N 0°16′26″E	
	Jintang Bridge	202.5 m (664 ft)	620 m (2,030 ft)	2009	Cable-stayed	China; Ningbo–Jintang Island, Zhejiang; 30°03′40″N 121°48′16″E	
	Xiangxihe Bridge	202.3 m (664 ft)	470 m (1,540 ft)	2019	Cable-stayed	China; Zigui County, Hubei; 30°58′41″N 110°45′50″E	
	Hongyancun Bridge	202 m (663 ft)	375 m (1,230 ft)	2022	Cable-stayed	China; Chongqing; 29°33′28″N 106°29′26″E	
	Xiangluzhou Bridge	202 m (663 ft)	300 m (980 ft)	2024	Cable-stayed	China; Changsha, Hunan; 28°20′16″N 112°53′29″E	
	Hardanger Bridge	201.5 m (661 ft)	1,310 m (4,300 ft)	2013	Suspension	Norway; Ulvik–Eidfjord, Vestland; 60°28′45″N 6°49′47″E	
	Ting Kau Bridge	201 m (659 ft)	475 m (1,558 ft)	1998	Cable-stayed	China; Ting Kau–Tsing Yi, Hong Kong; 22°21′51″N 114°04′47″E	
	Ada Bridge	200 m (660 ft)	376 m (1,234 ft)	2012	Cable-stayed	Serbia; Belgrade; 44°47′42″N 20°25′34″E	
	Pingtan Strait Rail-Road Bridge	200 m (660 ft)	532 m (1,745 ft)	2020	Cable-stayed	China; Changle–Pingtan County, Fujian; 25°41′45″N 119°37′40″E	

== Under construction ==
Photo	Name	Structural height metres (feet)	Main span metres (feet)	Opened	Design	Location	Ref.
	Puzhehei Bridge	385 m (1,263 ft)	930 m (3,050 ft)	2029	Cable-stayed	China; Luxi County–Qiubei County, Yunnan; 24°16′52″N 103°48′54″E	
	Second Sutong Yangtze River Bridge	380 m (1,250 ft)	2,300 m (7,500 ft)	2031	Suspension with cable-stayed	China; Suzhou–Nantong, Jiangsu; 31°54′41″N 120°51′20″E	
	Anqing Haikou Yangtze River Bridge	376 m (1,234 ft)	1,100 m (3,600 ft)	2030	Cable-stayed	China; Anqing, Anhui; 30°27′43.4″N 116°58′10.3″E	
	Second Badong Yangtze River Bridge	374 m (1,227 ft)	1,090 m (3,580 ft)	2030	Cable-stayed	China; Badong County, Hubei; 31°3′2″N 110°22′49″E	
	Wushan Shennv Yangtze River Bridge	371.5 m (1,219 ft)	898 m (2,946 ft)	2028	Cable-stayed	China; Wushan County, Chongqing; 31°03′29″N 109°51′25″E	
	Zhangjinggao Yangtze River Bridge	350 m (1,150 ft)	2,300 m (7,500 ft)	2028	Suspension	China; Zhangjiagang–Jingjiang–Rugao, Jiangsu; 32°01′35″N 120°31′38″E	
	Ma'anshan Yangtze River Rail-Road Bridge	348 m (1,142 ft)	1,120 m (3,670 ft)	2026	Cable-stayed	China; Ma'anshan, Anhui; 31°35′36″N 118°23′26″E	
	Shiziyang Bridge	340.2 m (1,116 ft)	2,180 m (7,150 ft)	2028	Suspension	China; Guangzhou–Dongguan, Guangdong; 22°51′13″N 113°33′59″E	
	Daxi River Bridge	312.4 m (1,025 ft)	650 m (2,130 ft)	2026	Cable-stayed	China; Fengjie County, Chongqing; 30°59′09″N 109°36′06″E	
	Jinqi Bridge	300.6 m (986 ft)	320 m (1,050 ft)	2026	Cable-stayed	China; Qingzhen–Xiuwen County, Guizhou; 26°49′10″N 106°26′20″E	
	Xihoumen Rail/Road Bridge	294 m (965 ft)	1,480 m (4,860 ft)	2026	Suspension with cable-stayed	China; Zhoushan, Zhejiang; 30°04′59″N 121°53′55″E	
	Fuling Yangtze River Rail-Road Bridge	292 m (958 ft)	736 m (2,415 ft)		Cable-stayed	China; Fuling, Chongqing; 29°48′54″N 107°28′29″E	
	Chizhou Yangtze River Rail-Road Bridge	286 m (938 ft)	812 m (2,664 ft)	2027	Cable-stayed	China; Chizhou, Anhui; 30°45′28″N 117°34′31″E	
	Lena Bridge	284.5 m (933 ft)	840 m (2,760 ft)	2028	Cable-stayed	Russia; Yakutsk, Sakha Republic; 61°48′04″N 129°41′20″E	
	Lugu Lake Bridge	283 m (928 ft)	1,680 m (5,510 ft)	2027	Suspension	China; Yanyuan County, Sichuan; 27°40′26″N 101°07′52″E	
	Zhongshan Xiangshan Bridge	272.8 m (895 ft)	880 m (2,890 ft)	2026	Cable-stayed	China; Zhongshan, Guangdong; 22°34′43″N 113°32′25″E	
	Guanyinsi Yangtze River Bridge	262 m (860 ft)	1,160 m (3,810 ft)	2026	Cable-stayed	China; Gong'an County–Jiangling County, Hubei; 30°06′17″N 112°12′13″E	
	Shenzhen-Jiangmen Rail-Road Hongqili Bridge	258 m (846 ft)	808 m (2,651 ft)	2028	Cable-stayed	China; Zhongshan, Guangdong; 22°40′36″N 113°31′27″E	
	Sichuan-Tibet Railway Dadu River Bridge	256 m (840 ft)	1,060 m (3,480 ft)	2028	Suspension	China; Luding County, Sichuan; 29°55′50″N 102°13′45″E	
	Shuangyumen Bridge	254 m (833 ft)	1,768 m (5,801 ft)	2027	Suspension	China; Zhoushan, Zhejiang; 29°43′35″N 122°02′14″E	
	Guangming Niulanjiang Bridge	253.5 m (832 ft)	370 m (1,210 ft)	2026	Cable-stayed	China; Ludian County–Qiaojia County, Yunnan; 27°03′11″N 103°22′42″E	
	Fuling Shituo Yangtze River Rail-Road Bridge	253 m (830 ft)	608 m (1,995 ft)	2026	Cable-stayed	China; Fuling, Chongqing; 29°43′16″N 107°7′58″E	
	Lixianjiang Bridge	250 m (820 ft)	420 m (1,380 ft)	2025	Cable-stayed	China; Jiangcheng County–Lüchun County, Yunnan; 22°47′24.1″N 101°59′39.2″E	
	Qinglongmen First Bridge	249 m (817 ft)	756 m (2,480 ft)	2027	Cable-stayed	China; Ningbo–Zhoushan, Zhejiang; 29°44′9″N 121°59′18″E	
	Yongchang Lancang River Bridge	248 m (814 ft)	1,416 m (4,646 ft)	2028	Suspension	China; Changning County, Yunnan; 24°53′30″N 99°44′39″E	
	Xiazhou Yangtze River Rail-Road Bridge	246.5 m (809 ft)	800 m (2,600 ft)		Cable-stayed	China; Yichang, Hubei; 30°39′20″N 111°19′34″E	
	Bailizhou Yangtze River Bridge	241 m (791 ft)	890 m (2,920 ft)	2026	Cable-stayed	China; Zhijiang, Hubei; 30°25′00.8″N 111°46′36.0″E	
	Min'an Bridge	226 m (741 ft)	716 m (2,349 ft)	2027	Cable-stayed	China; Fuzhou, Fujian; 26°3′15″N 119°30′31″E	
	G9221 Hangyong Yongjiang Bridge	223 m (732 ft)	570 m (1,870 ft)	2026	Cable-stayed	China; Ningbo, Zhejiang; 29°58′26″N 121°44′13″E	
	Xiangjiang Railway Bridge	222 m (728 ft)	235 m (771 ft)	2026	Extradossed	China; Bozhou–Weng'an County, Guizhou; 27°25′14″N 107°14′34″E	
	Baihua Lake Bridge	219 m (719 ft)	320 m (1,050 ft)	2026	Cable-stayed	China; Guiyang, Guizhou; 26°36′22″N 106°28′33″E	
	Taoyaomen Rail-Road Bridge	218 m (715 ft)	666 m (2,185 ft)	2026	Cable-stayed	China; Zhoushan, Zhejiang; 30°6′3″N 121°57′36″E	
	Libu Yangtze River Rail/Road Bridge	215.2 m (706 ft)	1,120 m (3,670 ft)	2028	Suspension with cable-stayed	China; Jingzhou, Hubei; 30°17′14″N 112°04′33″E	
	Shuangliu Yangtze River Bridge	212.8 m (698 ft)	1,430 m (4,690 ft)	2026	Suspension	China; Wuhan–Ezhou, Hubei; 30°36′34″N 114°45′04″E	
	Hangzhou Bay Railway Center Bridge	202 m (663 ft)	448 m (1,470 ft)	2027	Cable-stayed	China; Haiyan County–Cixi, Zhejiang; 30°27′59″N 121°0′21″E	
	Tamkang Bridge	200 m (660 ft)	450 m (1,480 ft)	2026	Cable-stayed	Taiwan; New Taipei City; 25°10′31″N 121°25′04″E	
	Hangzhou Bay Railway North Bridge	200 m (660 ft)	450 m (1,480 ft)	2027	Cable-stayed	China; Haiyan County–Cixi, Zhejiang; 30°29′29″N 120°56′44″E	

== See also ==
- List of highest bridges
- List of longest bridges
- List of longest suspension bridge spans
- List of longest cable-stayed bridge spans
- List of longest masonry arch bridge spans
- List of longest arch bridge spans
- List of longest beam bridge spans
- List of tallest towers
- List of tallest buildings and structures
- List of tallest buildings and structures by country
