= SkyBridge (TransLink) =

Cable-stayed bridge in Metro Vancouver, Canada

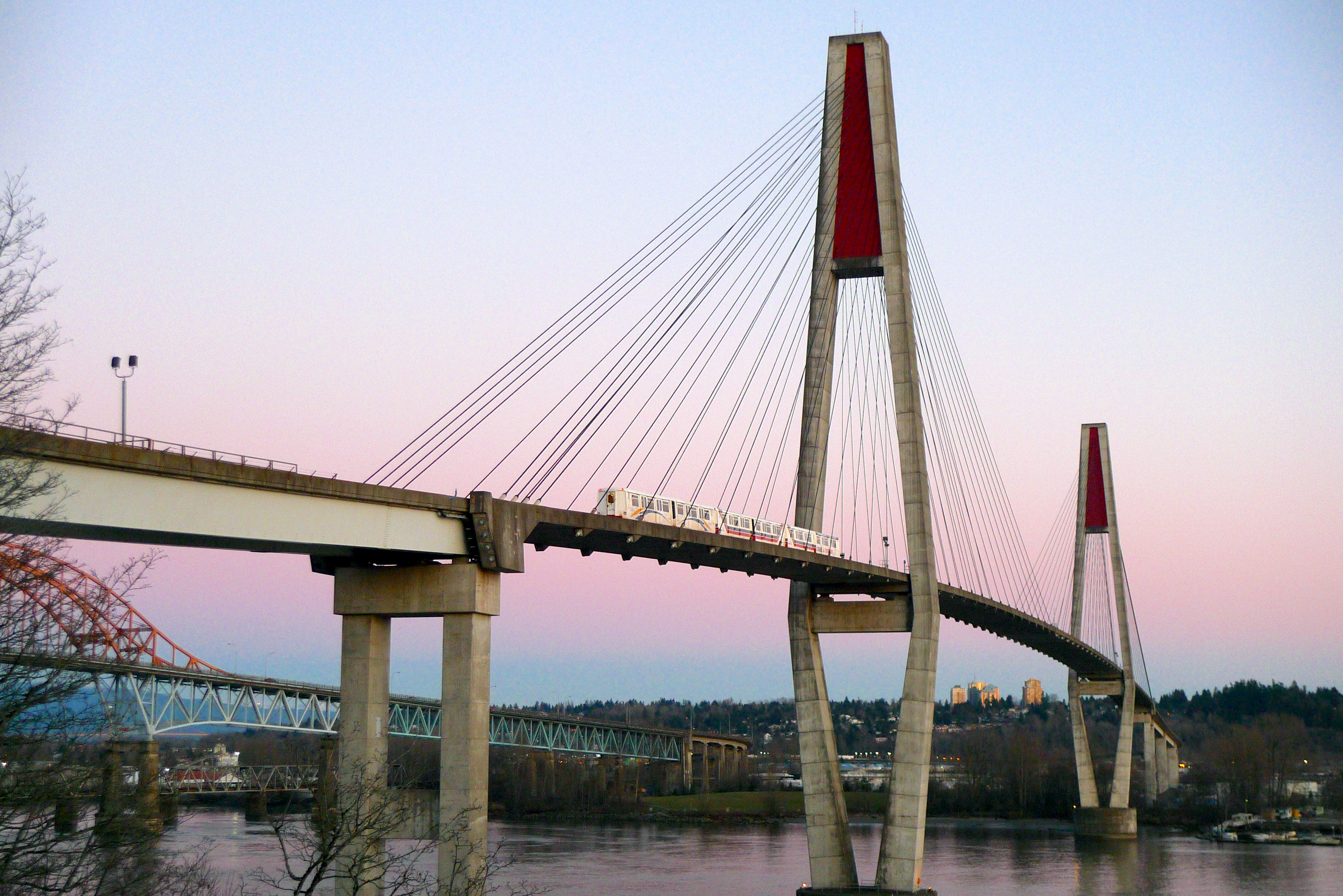
- Coordinates: 49°12′20″N 122°53′49″W
- Carries: Two tracks of the Expo Line and a maintenance track
- Crosses: Fraser River
- Locale: New Westminster; Surrey

Characteristics
- Total length: 616 metres (2,021 ft)
- Height: 123 metres (404 ft)
- Longest span: 340 metres (1,115 ft)
- No. of spans: 3
- Piers in water: 2
- Clearance below: 45 metres (148 ft)

Rail characteristics
- No. of tracks: 2
- Track gauge: 1,435 mm (4 ft 8 1/2 in) standard gauge
- Electrified: 600 V DC third & fourth rail linear induction

History
- Opened: March 16, 1990; 36 years ago

Location
- Interactive map of SkyBridge

The SkyBridge is a cable-stayed railway bridge in Metro Vancouver, British Columbia, Canada. Built between 1987 and 1989, it carries trains of the Expo Line of TransLink's SkyTrain across the Fraser River between New Westminster and Surrey. The SkyBridge opened for revenue use on March 16, 1990, with the second half of the Phase II extension of SkyTrain to Scott Road station.

== History ==
Construction of the bridge began on October 28, 1987. The first half of the bridge heading towards Surrey was completed first, with the New Westminster half being completed on March 19, 1990. The bridge was built by Hyundai Engineering & Construction and Kerkhoff Construction, a Chilliwack-based construction company with a total cost of CA$28 million, or $67.1 million in 2025 dollars. Construction was completed by September 1988, and testing began in 1989.

== Details ==
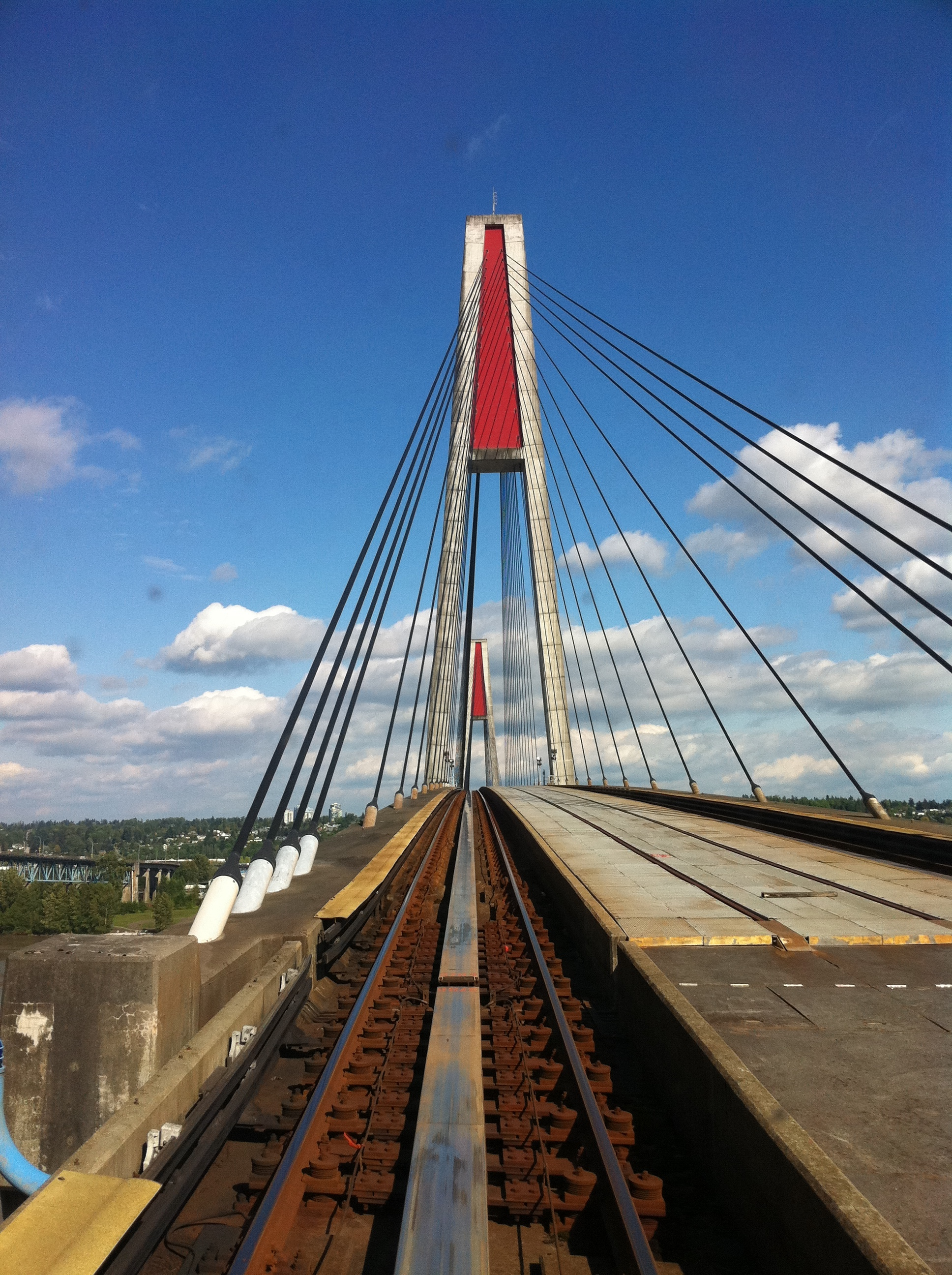
Detail of the tracks in 2011

The SkyBridge has two tracks carrying Expo Line trains which run between King George station in Surrey and Waterfront station in Downtown Vancouver. A third set of rails in the middle, not connected to the SkyTrain tracks, is used by maintenance crews to truck equipment back and forth on the bridge. The deck is composed of 104 pre-fabricated concrete sections which were built in Richmond, transported via barge, and lifted into place with heavy machinery. When constructed, the concrete sections were glued together with an epoxy resin. The bridge does not carry road traffic, which uses the neighbouring Stal̕əw̓asəm Bridge instead.

The bridge has two 123-metre (404 ft) tall towers and carries trains 45 metres (148 ft) above the Fraser River and valley. The main span is 340 metres (1,120 ft) and the total length is 616 metres (2,021 ft). The bridge was the longest cable-supported transit-only bridge in the world from its opening in 1990 to 2019, it has since been surpassed by the Egongyan Rail Transit Bridge, the Nanjimen Yangtze River Bridge and tied with the Gaojia Huayuan Jialing River Rail Transit Bridge, all in Chongqing, China.

== Delayed opening ==
The opening of the bridge faced some delay as the non-unionized consortium was accused of underbidding unionized firms. In response, labour organizers pressured other unions to boycott the project altogether. The issue was the climax of a series of defeats for construction unions as a result of the Social Credit Party's preference for non-union workers. The situation drew ire from the BC and Yukon Building and Construction Trades Council, who called it a "hot site".

== See also ==
- List of crossings of the Fraser River
- List of bridges in British Columbia
