= Xindu Jinsha River Bridge =

Xindu Jinsha River Bridge 新渡金沙江大桥
- Coordinates: 28°40′6″N 103°51′48″E
- Carries: G4216 Chengdu–Lijiang Expressway
- Crosses: Jinsha River
- Locale: Pingshan County, Sichuan–Suijiang County, Yunnan

Characteristics
- Design: Cable-stayed bridge
- Total length: 1,867 metres (6,125 ft)
- Height: north tower 290.2 metres (952 ft) south tower 297.5 metres (976 ft)
- Longest span: 680 metres (2,230 ft)
- Clearance below: 190 metres (620 ft)
- No. of lanes: 4

History
- Construction start: September 2020
- Opened: 1 January 2026

Location
- Interactive map of Xindu Jinsha River Bridge

The Xindu Jinsha River Bridge (Chinese: 新渡金沙江大桥), previously called Xinshi Jinsha River Bridge (Chinese: 新市金沙江大桥), is a bridge between Pingshan County, Yibin City Sichuan and Suijiang County, Yunnan, China. It is one of the tallest bridge structure in the world with a sout tower 297.5 metres (976 ft) tall. It was opened to traffic on 1 January 2026.

== See also ==
- Bridges and tunnels across the Yangtze River
- List of longest cable-stayed bridge spans
- List of tallest bridges
- List of highest bridges
