= Yunwu Bridge =

Bridge in southwestern China

Yunwu Bridge 云雾大桥
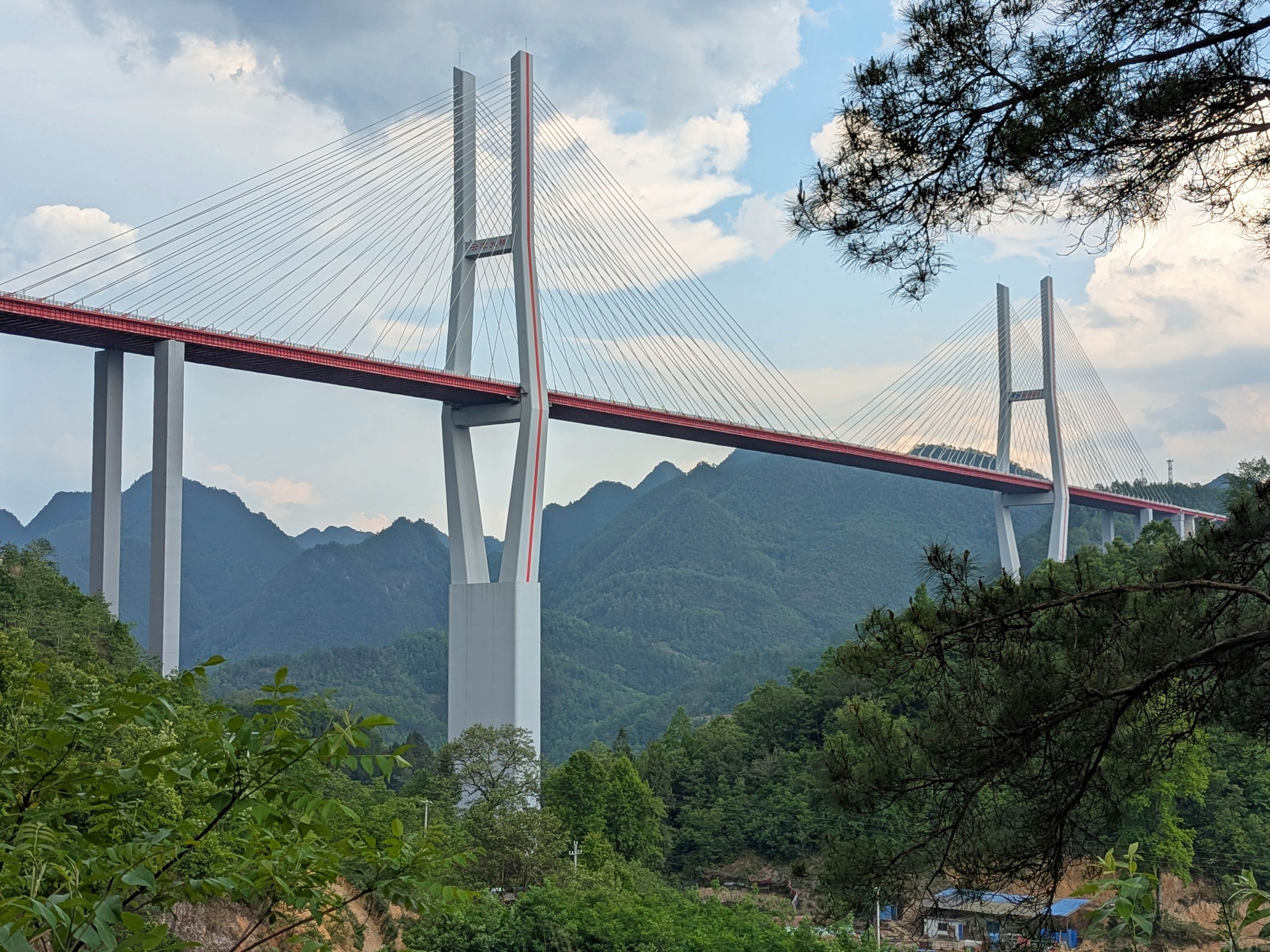
- Coordinates: 26°10′48″N 107°9′39″E
- Carries: G7611 Duyun–Shangri-La Expressway
- Crosses: Liaomi River
- Locale: Guiding County, Guizhou

Characteristics
- Design: Cable-stayed bridge
- Total length: 1,720 metres (5,640 ft)
- Height: west tower 300 metres (980 ft) east tower 273 metres (896 ft)
- Longest span: 480 metres (1,570 ft)
- Clearance below: 235 metres (771 ft)
- No. of lanes: 4

History
- Construction start: November 10, 2017
- Opened: June 28, 2021

Location
- Interactive map of Yunwu Bridge

The Yunwu Bridge (Chinese: 云雾大桥) is a bridge in Guiding County, Guizhou, China. It is one of the tallest bridge structure in the world with a west tower 300 metres (980 ft) tall. It was opened to traffic on June 28, 2021.

== See also ==
- List of tallest bridges
