= Xianshen River Bridge =

Xianshen River Bridge 仙神河大桥
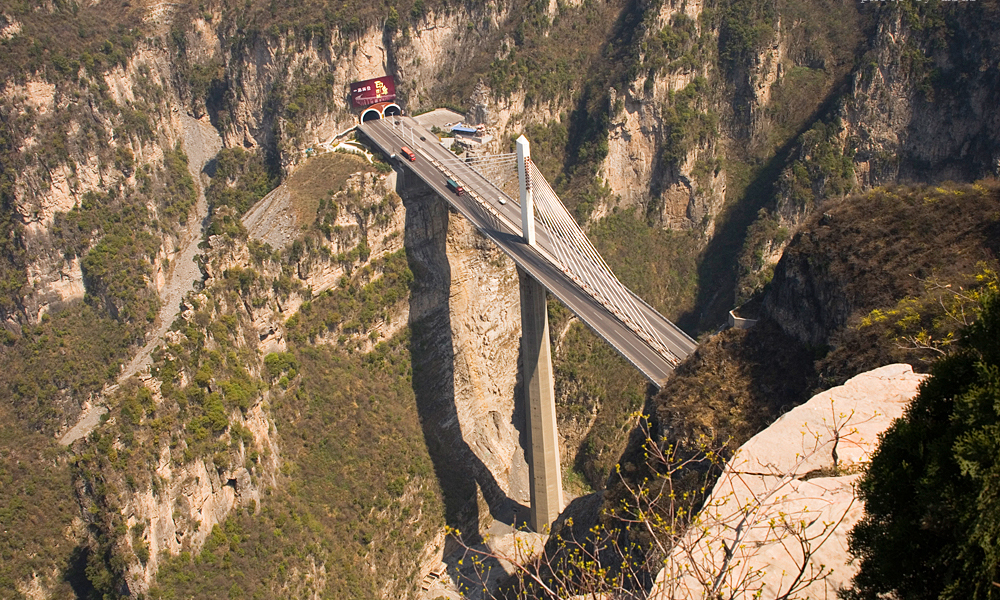
- Coordinates: 35.245961°N 112.767308°E
- Carries: 4 lanes of the G55 Erenhot–Guangzhou Expressway
- Crosses: Xianshen River
- Locale: Jincheng, Shanxi

Characteristics
- Design: Cable-stayed
- Total length: 267 metres (876 ft)
- Height: 212 metres (696 ft)
- Longest span: 136 metres (446 ft)
- Clearance below: 161 metres (528 ft)

History
- Opened: 2009

Location
- Interactive map of Xianshen River Bridge

The Xianshen River Bridge is a cable-stayed bridge near Jincheng, in Shanxi, China. The bridge is 267 metres (876 ft) and is part of the G55 Erenhot–Guangzhou Expressway crossing the Xianshen River. The central pillar is 212 metres (696 ft) high, placing it amongst the tallest bridges in the world.

== See also ==
- List of tallest bridges in the world
