= Gaojia Huayuan Jialing River Rail Transit Bridge =

Railway bridge in Chongqing, China

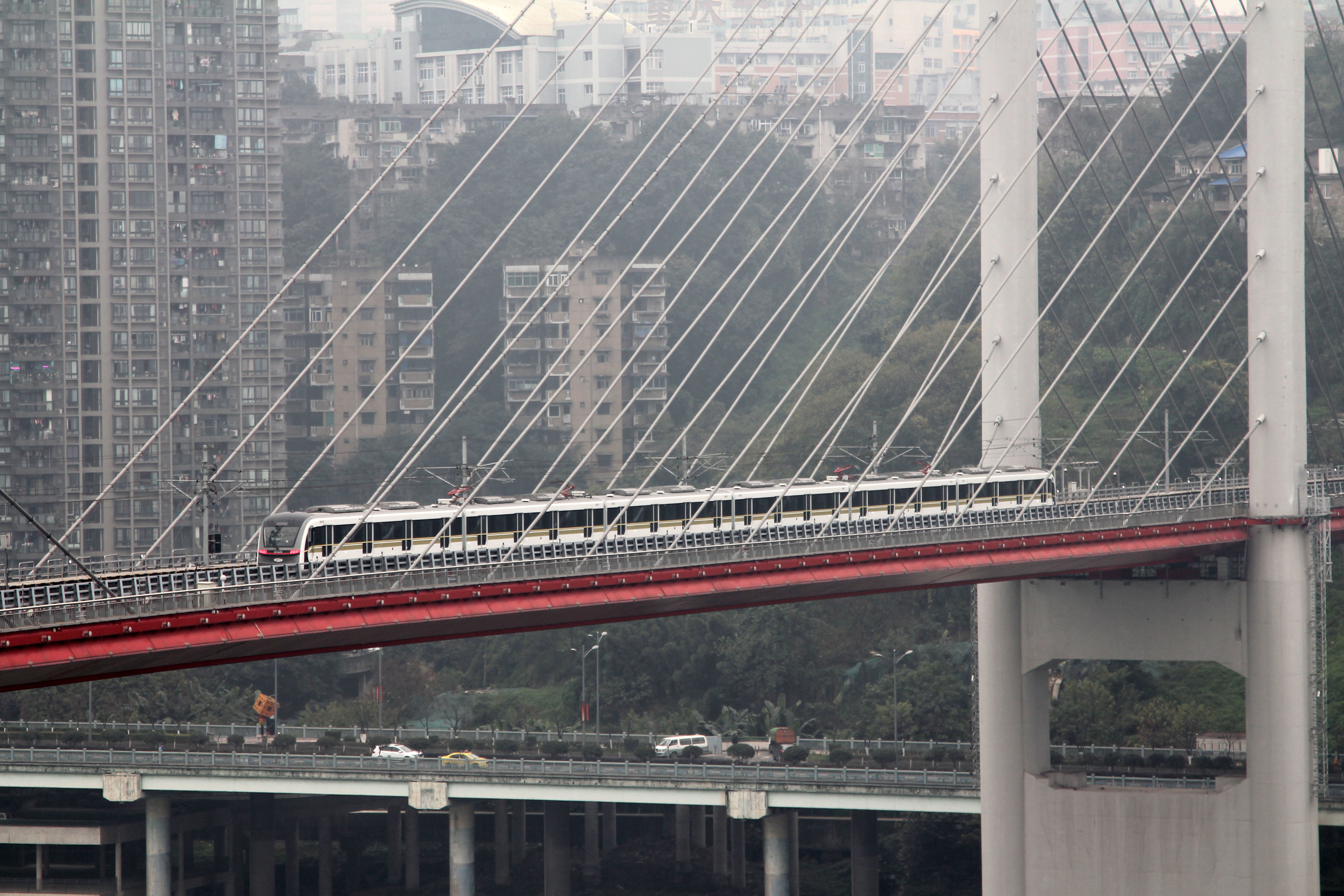
Loop Line Train on Gaojiahuayuan Rail Bridge

Gaojia Huayuan Jialing River Rail Transit Bridge is a rail transit suspension bridge crossing the Jialing River between Shapingba District and Jiangbei District in Chongqing. The bridge carries trains for the Chongqing Rail Transit Loop line. It was put into use on December 18, 2018.

The bridge is a cable-stayed bridge with a total length of 577 meters, a width of 19.6 meters, and a main span of 340 meters and has one of the longest transit only bridge spans in the world.
