= Nanjing Dashengguan Yangtze River Bridge =

Nanjing Dashengguan Yangtze River Bridge 南京大胜关长江大桥
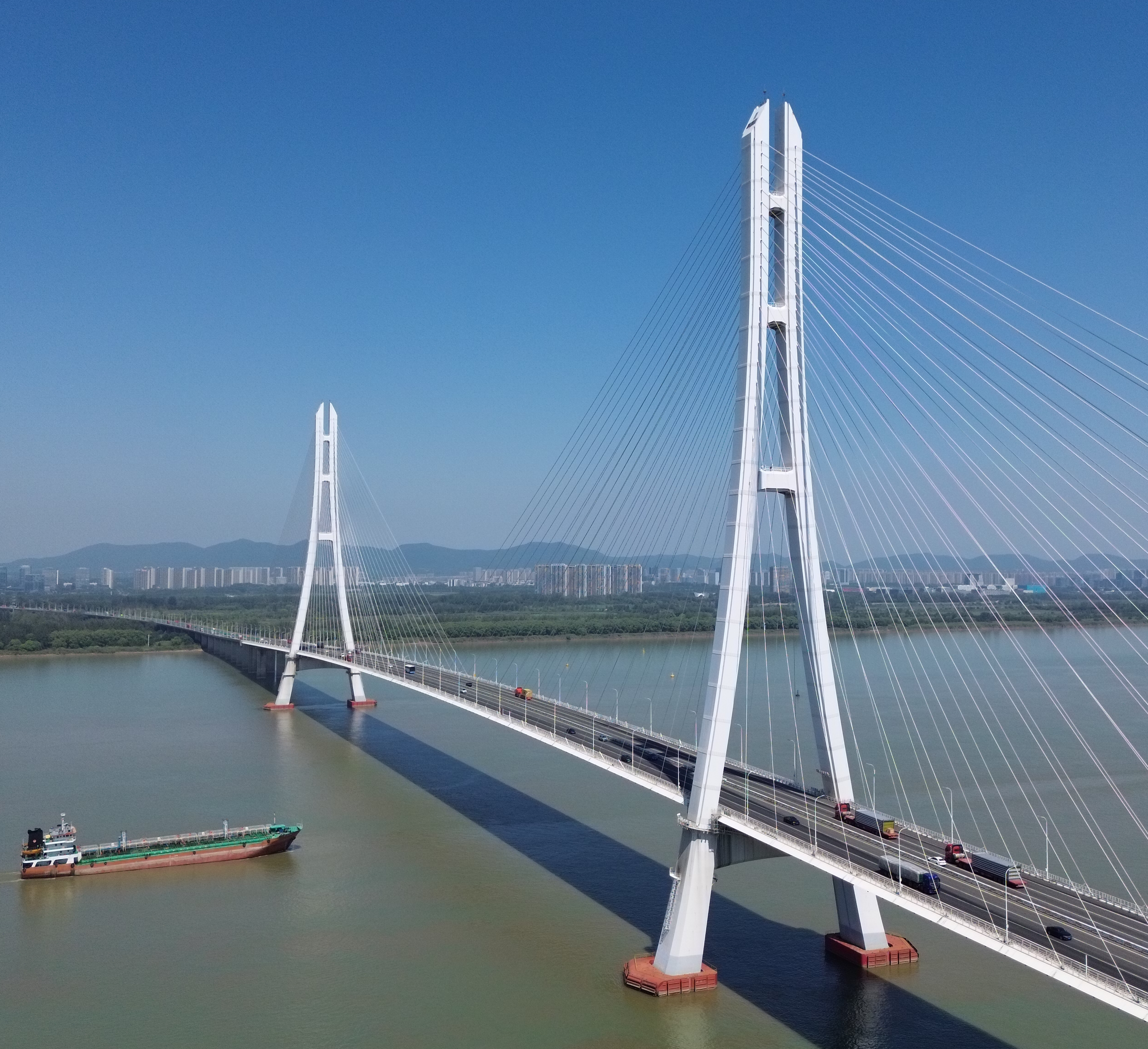
- View from the river
- Coordinates: 31°58′12″N 118°38′29″E
- Carries: G42 and G2503
- Crosses: Yangtze River
- Locale: Nanjing, Jiangsu, China

Characteristics
- Design: Cable-stayed
- Total length: 1,288 m (4,226 ft)
- Width: 37.5 m (123 ft)
- Height: 215 m (705 ft)
- Longest span: 648 m (2,126 ft)

History
- Opened: October 7, 2005

Statistics
- Daily traffic: 60,000 vehicles (by 2025)

Location
- Interactive map of Nanjing Dashengguan Yangtze River Bridge

The Nanjing Dashengguan Yangtze River Bridge (Chinese: 南京大胜关长江大桥), formerly Third Nanjing Yangtze Bridge (Chinese: 南京长江三桥), is the first cable-stayed bridge with steel tower stanchions located in Nanjing, China. It is the third crossing of the Yangtze River at Nanjing. The cable-stayed portion is just a part of the 4.7 kilometers of the complete bridge. Constructed in slightly more than two years at a cost of $490 million, this bridge features dual 215 meters towers. The main span measures 648 meters. When it was completed in 2005 it was the third longest cable stayed span in the world. The bridge carries the G42 Shanghai–Chengdu Expressway and the G2503 Nanjing Ring Expressway. The bridge has renamed on 20 December 2019.

== Structure ==
The deck superstructure is an orthotropic box girder 3.2 m deep and 37.5 wide that accommodates three lanes of traffic in each direction. Also the bridge has a center lane used in case of emergency. The deck is supported by 168 stay cables. Each cable is formed by 109 to 241 wires 7 mm in diameter and 215 m in height.

== Funding ==
The bridge was financed by a joint venture of Chinese public-sector and corporate entities. China's Highway Planning and Design Institute, part of the Ministry of Communications, led the design team.

== See also ==
- Bridges and tunnels across the Yangtze River
- List of bridges in China
- List of longest cable-stayed bridge spans
- List of tallest bridges in the world
