= Kangbo Yangtze River Bridge =

Kangbo Yangtze River Bridge 康博长江二桥
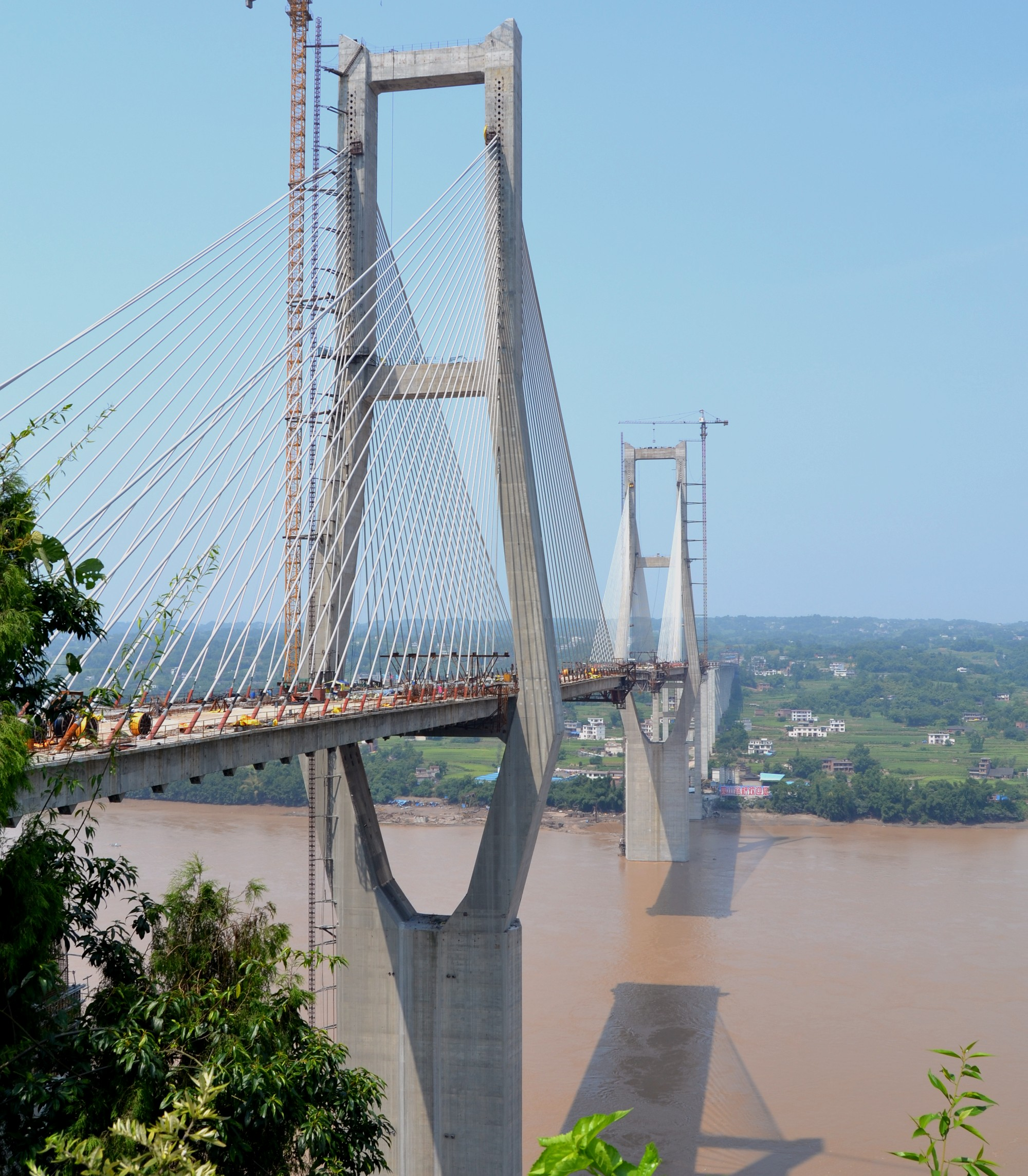
- The Hejiang Bridge under construction.
- Coordinates: 28.845031°N 105.798585°E
- Carries: G93 Chengdu–Chongqing Ring Expressway
- Crosses: Yangtze River
- Locale: Hejiang County, Sichuan, China

Characteristics
- Design: Cable-stayed
- Material: Steel
- Total length: 1,715 metres (5,627 ft)
- Width: 30 metres (98 ft)
- Height: 208 metres (682 ft)
- Longest span: 420 metres (1,380 ft)

History
- Construction end: 2012
- Opened: June 3, 2013

Location
- Interactive map of Kangbo Yangtze River Bridge

The Kangbo Yangtze River Bridge (Chinese: 康博长江二桥), formerly the Second Hejiang Bridge, is a highway bridge over the Yangtze River in Hejiang County, Sichuan, China. The bridge is on the G93 Chengdu–Chongqing Ring Expressway just 10 kilometres west of the Bosideng Bridge. It was originally called Hejiang Bridge 2 since Bosideng Bridge was first called Hejiang Bridge 1. The bridge has a length of 1,715 metres (5,627 ft) and is 30 metres (98 ft) wide. Its two pylons are each 208 metres (682 ft) high, making the bridge to the one with the highest pylons in Sichuan.

== See also ==
- Yangtze River bridges and tunnels
- List of largest cable-stayed bridges
- List of longest arch bridge spans
