= G2503 Nanjing Ring Expressway =

Ring expressway in Nanjing, Jiangsu Province, China

Nanjing Ring Expressway
- 南京绕城高速公路
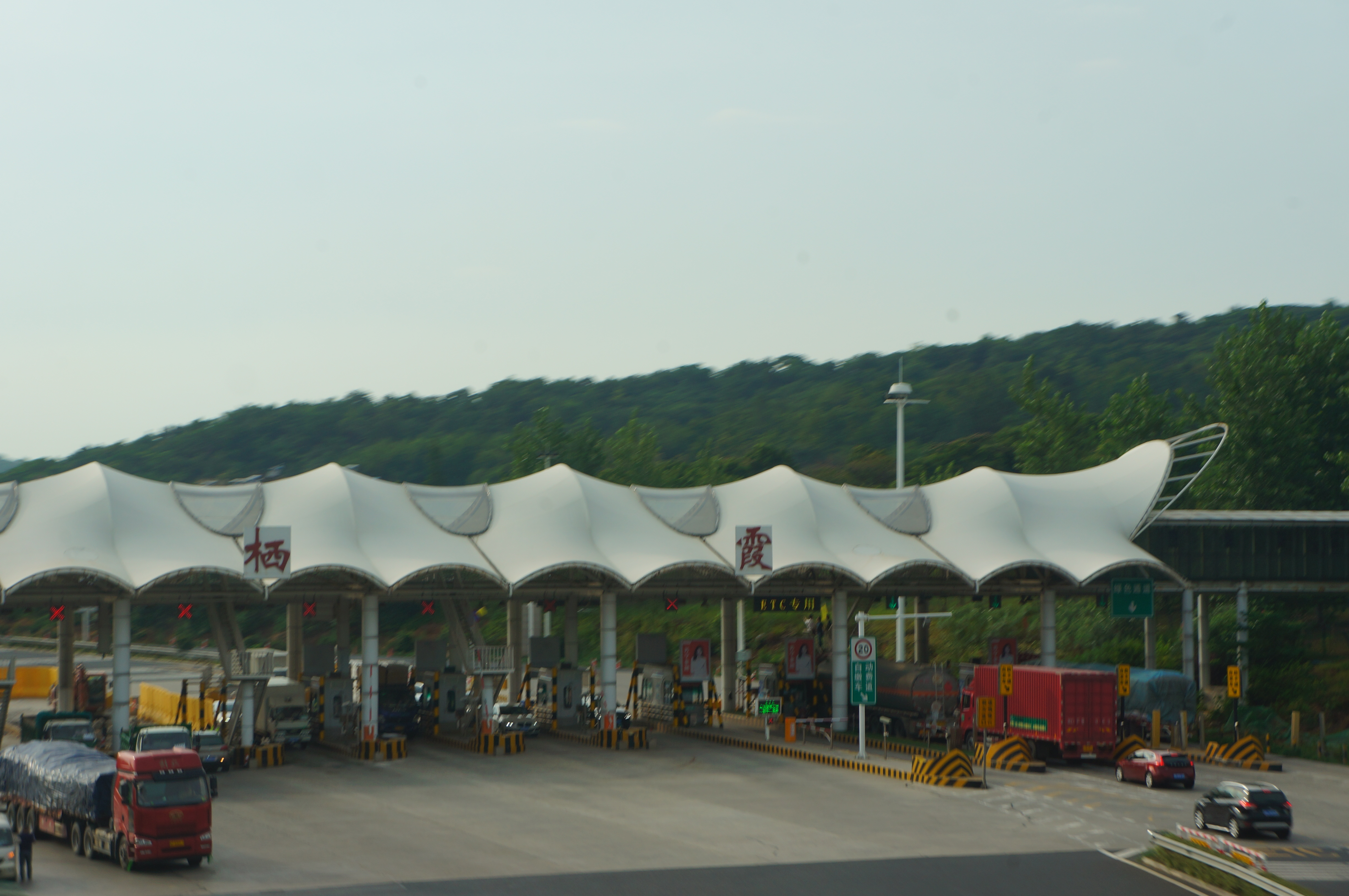
- Qixia Toll Plaza in June 2018

Route information
- Length: 166 km (103 mi)
- Existed: 2005–present

Location
- Country: China

Highway system
- National Trunk Highway System; Primary; Auxiliary; National Highways; Transport in China
← G2502	→ G2504

The Nanjing Ring Expressway (Chinese: 南京绕城高速公路), designated as G2503, is ring expressway in Nanjing, Jiangsu, China.

== History ==
The first section was opened to traffic on 7 October 2005 which included opening of the Nanjing Dashengguan Yangtze River Bridge. The Ninglian Expressway (Ninghuai Expressway) section was opened to traffic 18 in December 2006, the southeast section was opened to traffic on 30 September 2010, and the whole expressway was opened to traffic on 24 December 2012. Several sections of the expressway run concurrently with the G25, G40 and G42 expressways.
