= Nanjing Baguazhou Yangtze River Bridge =

Nanjing Baguazhou Yangtze River Bridge 南京八卦洲长江大桥
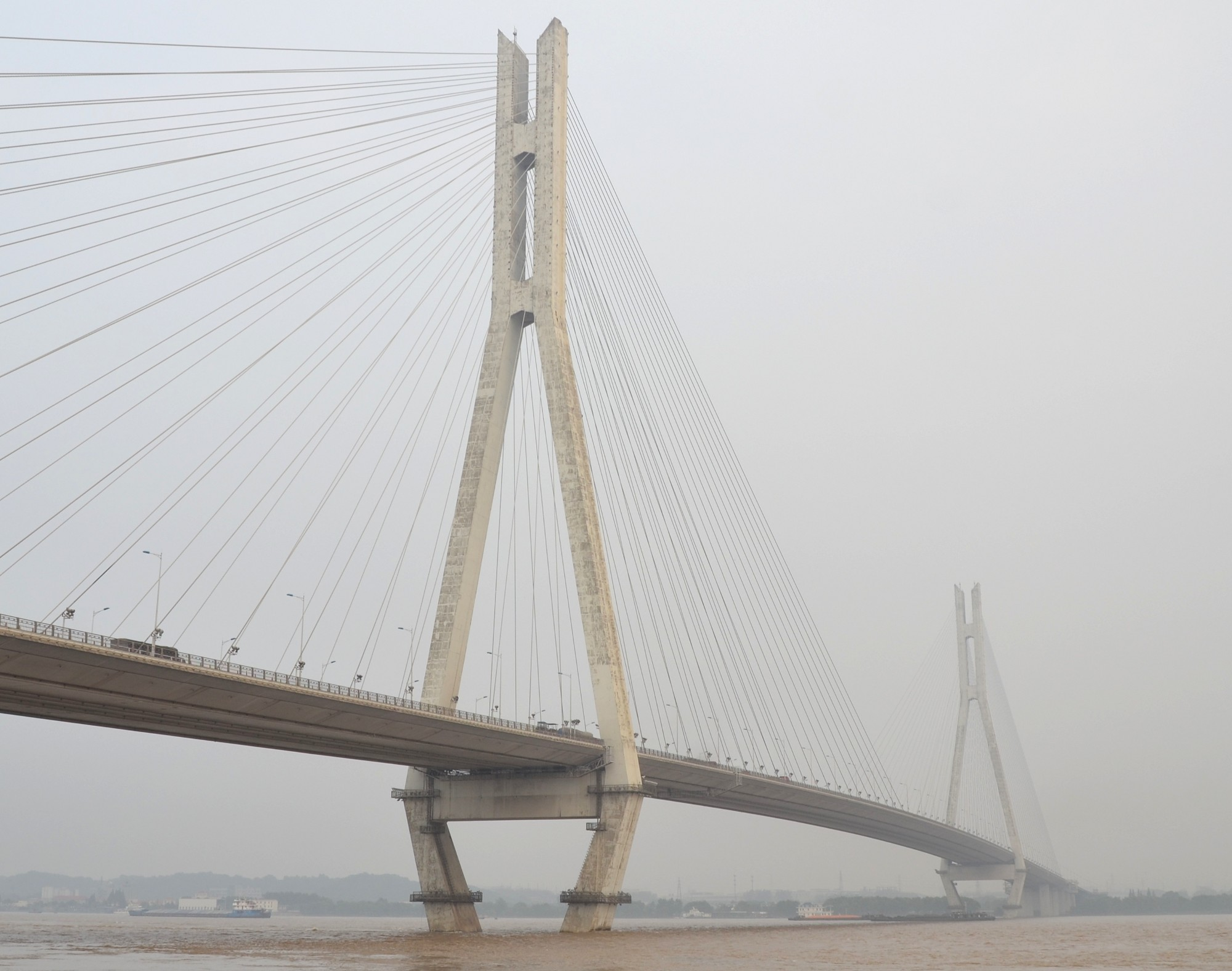
- Coordinates: 32.16258°N 118.836196°E
- Carries: G36 and G104
- Crosses: Yangtze River
- Locale: Nanjing, Jiangsu, China

Characteristics
- Design: Cable-stayed bridge
- Total length: 1,238 m (4,062 ft)
- Width: 37.2 m (122 ft)
- Height: 195.41 m (641 ft)
- Longest span: 628 m (2,060 ft)

History
- Construction start: October 1997
- Construction cost: $400 million
- Opened: March 2001

Statistics
- Toll: yes

Location
- Interactive map of Nanjing Baguazhou Yangtze River Bridge

The Nanjing Baguazhou Yangtze River Bridge (Chinese: 南京八卦洲长江大桥), formerly Second Nanjing Yangtze Bridge (Chinese: 南京长江二桥), is a cable-stayed bridge over the Yangtze River in Nanjing, China. The bridge spans 628 metres (2,060 ft) carrying traffic on the G36 Nanjing–Luoyang Expressway and new route of China National Highway 104. When it was completed it was the third longest cable-stayed bridge in the world. As of 2013 it is still among the 20 longest bridges. The bridge crosses from the Qixia District in south-east of the river over to Bagua Island. The bridge was renamed on 20 December 2019.

The bridge was inaugurated for traffic on March 26, 2001, with its name etched by Jiang Zemin, the General Secretary of the Chinese Communist Party.

== See also ==
- Bridges and tunnels across the Yangtze River
- List of bridges in China
- List of longest cable-stayed bridge spans
- List of tallest bridges
