= Nanjing Xianxin Yangtze River Bridge =

Chinese suspended bridge

Nanjing Xianxin Yangtze River Bridge 南京新生圩长江大桥
- Coordinates: 32°10′55″N 118°53′40″E
- Crosses: Yangtze River
- Locale: Nanjing, Jiangsu, China
- Other name: Nanjing Xinshengwei Yangtze River Bridge

Characteristics
- Design: Suspension bridge
- Width: 31.5 m (103 ft)
- Height: 277.3 m (910 ft)
- Longest span: 1,760 m (5,774 ft)
- Clearance above: 50 m (164 ft)

History
- Designer: China Railway Major Bridge Reconnaissance & Design Institute Co. Ltd.
- Constructed by: China Communications Construction Company (CCCC)
- Construction start: November 10, 2018
- Construction end: September 23, 2023
- Opened: November 26, 2025

Location
- Interactive map of Nanjing Xianxin Yangtze River Bridge

The Nanjing Xianxin Yangtze River Bridge (Chinese: 南京新生圩长江大桥), also known as Nanjing Xinshengwei Yangtze River Bridge, is a suspension bridge over the Yangtze River in Nanjing, China.

== Locale ==
The bridge it is located 4.3 km upstream from the Fourth Nanjing Yangtze Bridge and 6.2 km downstream from the Second Nanjing Yangtze Bridge.

== Description ==
The total length of the project is 13.17 km, including the approaches and connecting sections. It is designed to carry six road lanes. The structure uses a gate-shaped reinforced concrete frame for the towers.

== See also ==
- List of longest suspension bridge spans
- Bridges and tunnels across the Yangtze River
- Nanjing Yangtze River Bridge
- Nanjing Qixiashan Yangtze River Bridge
