= Nanjimen Yangtze River bridge =

Railway bridge in Chongqing, China

Nanjimen Yangtze River Bridge 南纪门长江大桥
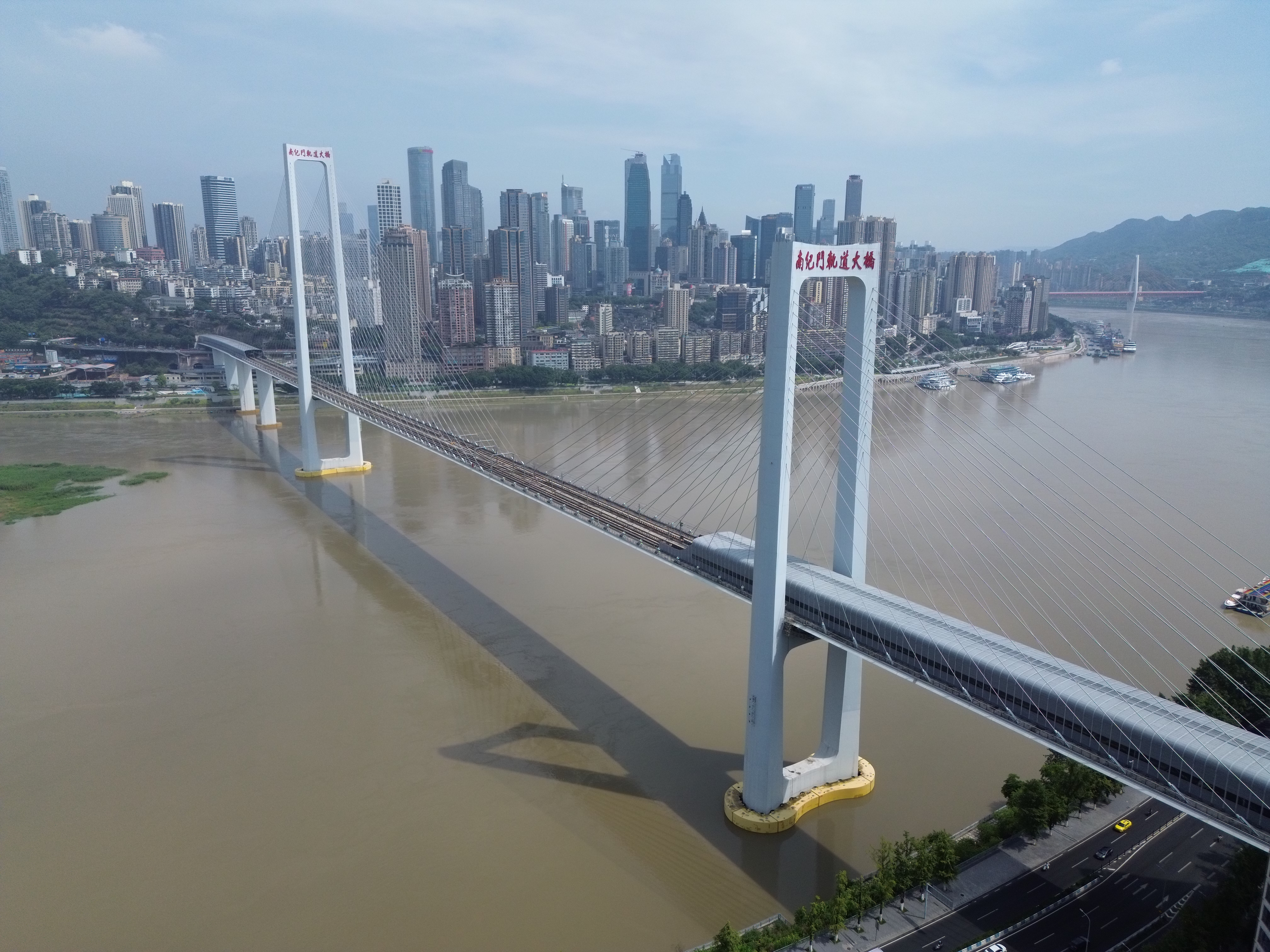
- The bridge in September 2025 from the Nan'an side
- Coordinates: 29°32′46″N 106°33′53″E
- Carries: Chongqing Rail Transit Line 10
- Crosses: Yangtze River
- Locale: Yuzhong–Nan'an, Chongqing, China
- Preceded by: Shibanpo Yangtze River Bridge
- Followed by: Dongshuimen Bridge

Characteristics
- Design: Cable-stayed bridge
- Material: Steel, concrete
- Total length: 1,225 m (4,019 ft)
- Width: 23.6 m (77 ft)
- Height: north tower 227 metres (745 ft) north tower 158 metres (518 ft)
- Longest span: 480 m (1,570 ft)

History
- Opened: 18 January 2023

Location
- Interactive map of Nanjimen Yangtze River Bridge

Nanjimen Yangtze River Bridge (Chinese: 南纪门长江大桥) is a rapid transit cable-stayed bridge that crosses the Yangtze to connect Yuzhong and Nan'an Districts in Chongqing. The bridge carries Chongqing Rail Transit Line 10 trains. It opened on 18 January 2023.

Nanjimen Yangtze River Bridge is located between Houbao and Qixinggang Stations of Line 10 Phase II of Chongqing Rail Transit. The total length of the bridge is 1,225 m (4,019 ft). With a main span of 480 m (1,575 ft) it is the longest metro-only cable-stayed bridge by main span in the world.

== See also ==
- Bridges and tunnels across the Yangtze River
- List of bridges in China
- List of longest cable-stayed bridge spans
- List of tallest bridges
