= Pingshan County, Sichuan =

Pingshan County 屏山县
- County
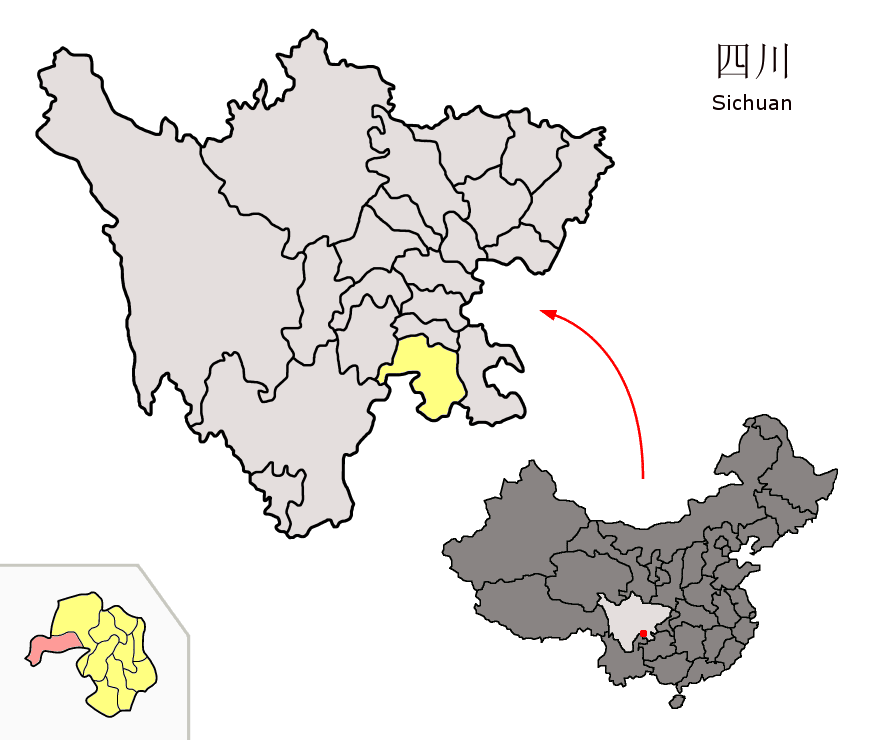
- Location of Pingshan County (red) within Yibin City (yellow) and Sichuan
- Country: China
- Province: Sichuan
- Prefecture-level city: Yibin
- County seat: Pingshan Town

Area
  - Total: 1,437 km^{2} (555 sq mi)

Population (2020 census)
  - Total: 245,184
  - Density: 170.6/km^{2} (441.9/sq mi)
- Time zone: UTC+8 (China Standard)
- Website: www.ybps.gov.cn

Pingshan County (Chinese: 屏山县; pinyin: Píngshān Xiàn; Yi: ꀻꎭꑤ or ꀽꎫꑤ) is a county located in southern Sichuan Province, China, bordering Yunnan province to the south. It is under the administration of Yibin city. It is on the route of China National Highway 213 and Sichuan Provincial Highway 307. As of 2012, there are 131 primary schools and 22 secondary schools in the county. There are 17 hospitals and clinics in the county. The county oversees eight towns and seven townships.

== Administrative divisions ==
Pingshan County administers 8 towns, 1 township and 2 ethnic townships:

- Jinping Town (锦屏镇)
- Xinshi Town (新市镇)
- Zhongdu Town (中都镇)
- Longhua Town (龙华镇)
- Dacheng Town (大乘镇)
- Xin'an Town (新安镇)
- Shulou Town (书楼镇)
- Pingshan Town (屏山镇)
- Xiaxi Township (夏溪乡)
- Pingbian Yi Ethnic Township (屏边彝族乡; ꀻꀜꆈꌠꑣ pip bie nuo su xie)
- Qingping Yi Ethnic Township (清平彝族乡; ꏽꀻꆈꌠꑣ} qix pip nuo su xie)

== Climate ==
Climate data for Jinping Town, Pingshan, elevation 462 m (1,516 ft), (1991–2020 normals, extremes 1981–present)
Month	Jan	Feb	Mar	Apr	May	Jun	Jul	Aug	Sep	Oct	Nov	Dec	Year
Record high °C (°F)	21.5 (70.7)	26.6 (79.9)	32.9 (91.2)	35.7 (96.3)	39.4 (102.9)	39.1 (102.4)	40.7 (105.3)	41.5 (106.7)	38.7 (101.7)	31.9 (89.4)	26.7 (80.1)	22.7 (72.9)	41.5 (106.7)
Mean daily maximum °C (°F)	11.5 (52.7)	15.0 (59.0)	20.2 (68.4)	25.4 (77.7)	28.7 (83.7)	30.1 (86.2)	32.9 (91.2)	32.0 (89.6)	27.9 (82.2)	22.8 (73.0)	18.4 (65.1)	13.1 (55.6)	23.2 (73.7)
Daily mean °C (°F)	8.2 (46.8)	10.9 (51.6)	14.9 (58.8)	19.6 (67.3)	22.8 (73.0)	24.8 (76.6)	27.0 (80.6)	26.3 (79.3)	23.2 (73.8)	18.9 (66.0)	14.6 (58.3)	9.7 (49.5)	18.4 (65.1)
Mean daily minimum °C (°F)	6.1 (43.0)	8.3 (46.9)	11.4 (52.5)	15.6 (60.1)	18.8 (65.8)	21.3 (70.3)	23.2 (73.8)	22.8 (73.0)	20.4 (68.7)	16.6 (61.9)	12.3 (54.1)	7.7 (45.9)	15.4 (59.7)
Record low °C (°F)	−1.8 (28.8)	0.1 (32.2)	4.1 (39.4)	7.3 (45.1)	11.9 (53.4)	15.0 (59.0)	18.3 (64.9)	17.0 (62.6)	15.3 (59.5)	10.4 (50.7)	2.9 (37.2)	0.8 (33.4)	−1.8 (28.8)
Average precipitation mm (inches)	13.7 (0.54)	13.2 (0.52)	28.6 (1.13)	63.0 (2.48)	87.8 (3.46)	127.1 (5.00)	205.1 (8.07)	235.2 (9.26)	142 (5.6)	52.3 (2.06)	20.7 (0.81)	13.3 (0.52)	1,002 (39.45)
Average precipitation days (≥ 0.1 mm)	10.3	9.3	11.4	13.4	13.9	16.6	15.5	15.5	15.7	16.3	11.7	10.0	159.6
Average snowy days	0.2	0	0	0	0	0	0	0	0	0	0	0	0.2
Average relative humidity (%)	79	75	71	71	71	78	80	81	84	85	82	80	78
Mean monthly sunshine hours	36.8	51.9	92.3	114.7	117.5	95.8	143.7	141.4	68.0	50.1	46.2	38.7	997.1
Percentage possible sunshine	11	16	25	30	28	23	34	35	18	14	15	12	22
Source: China Meteorological Administrationall-time July high
