= Suijiang County =

Coordinates: 28°35′53″N 103°57′25″E

Suijiang County 绥江县
- County
- Location of Suijiang County (red) and Zhaotong City (pink) within Yunnan
- Country: People's Republic of China
- Province: Yunnan
- Prefecture-level city: Zhaotong

Area
  - Total: 882 km^{2} (341 sq mi)

Population
  - Total: 160,000
  - Density: 180/km^{2} (470/sq mi)
- Time zone: UTC+8 (CST)
- Postal code: 657700
- Area code: 0870
- Website: suijiang.gov.cn

Suijiang County (simplified Chinese: 绥江县; traditional Chinese: 綏江縣; pinyin: Suíjiāng Xiàn) is a county in the northeast of Yunnan province, China, bordering Sichuan province across the Jinsha River to the north and west. It is under the administration of the prefecture-level city of Zhaotong.

== Administrative divisions ==
Suijiang County has 5 towns.

5 towns

- Zhongcheng (中城镇)
- Nan'an (南岸镇)
- Xintan (新滩镇)
- Huiyi (会仪镇)
- Banli (板栗镇)

== Transport ==
- China National Highway 213

== Farmer protest ==
At the end of March 2011, media reports and eyewitnesses say about 400 paramilitary troops, tactical unit police and militia members and riot police have dispersed a large-scale, 5-day protest by thousands of farmers who were upset about being moved off their land for a dam without adequate compensation.

== Climate ==
Climate data for Suijiang, elevation 497 m (1,631 ft), (1991–2020 normals, extremes 1981–present)
Month	Jan	Feb	Mar	Apr	May	Jun	Jul	Aug	Sep	Oct	Nov	Dec	Year
Record high °C (°F)	20.2 (68.4)	26.3 (79.3)	33.0 (91.4)	35.1 (95.2)	38.2 (100.8)	37.7 (99.9)	39.8 (103.6)	41.1 (106.0)	37.9 (100.2)	31.4 (88.5)	25.8 (78.4)	21.2 (70.2)	41.1 (106.0)
Mean daily maximum °C (°F)	11.2 (52.2)	14.0 (57.2)	18.9 (66.0)	24.5 (76.1)	27.7 (81.9)	29.4 (84.9)	31.6 (88.9)	31.4 (88.5)	27.0 (80.6)	21.7 (71.1)	17.7 (63.9)	12.6 (54.7)	22.3 (72.2)
Daily mean °C (°F)	8.2 (46.8)	10.5 (50.9)	14.4 (57.9)	19.3 (66.7)	22.5 (72.5)	24.5 (76.1)	26.3 (79.3)	26.1 (79.0)	22.7 (72.9)	18.4 (65.1)	14.4 (57.9)	9.7 (49.5)	18.1 (64.6)
Mean daily minimum °C (°F)	6.2 (43.2)	8.1 (46.6)	11.3 (52.3)	15.5 (59.9)	18.7 (65.7)	21.2 (70.2)	22.9 (73.2)	22.7 (72.9)	20.0 (68.0)	16.3 (61.3)	12.2 (54.0)	7.8 (46.0)	15.2 (59.4)
Record low °C (°F)	−1.2 (29.8)	−0.4 (31.3)	2.1 (35.8)	6.6 (43.9)	11.0 (51.8)	16.0 (60.8)	17.6 (63.7)	17.5 (63.5)	13.2 (55.8)	6.8 (44.2)	2.8 (37.0)	−1.0 (30.2)	−1.2 (29.8)
Average precipitation mm (inches)	11.7 (0.46)	13.8 (0.54)	29.9 (1.18)	64.1 (2.52)	85.5 (3.37)	123.6 (4.87)	213.1 (8.39)	203.8 (8.02)	106.3 (4.19)	50.9 (2.00)	20.3 (0.80)	11.5 (0.45)	934.5 (36.79)
Average precipitation days (≥ 0.1 mm)	10.9	10.4	13.2	14.4	15.4	18.1	16.9	16.2	17.1	18.2	11.9	10.5	173.2
Average snowy days	0.2	0.1	0	0	0	0	0	0	0	0	0	0.1	0.4
Average relative humidity (%)	78	76	73	72	72	79	81	81	83	84	80	79	78
Mean monthly sunshine hours	42.9	45.8	79.7	105.8	105.7	88.7	133.1	142.4	68.9	38.9	48.7	40.1	940.7
Percentage possible sunshine	13	14	21	27	25	21	31	35	19	11	15	13	20
Source: China Meteorological Administrationall-time extreme temperatureall-time July high
