= Nanjing Qixiashan Yangtze River Bridge =

Nanjing Qixiashan Yangtze River Bridge 南京栖霞山长江大桥
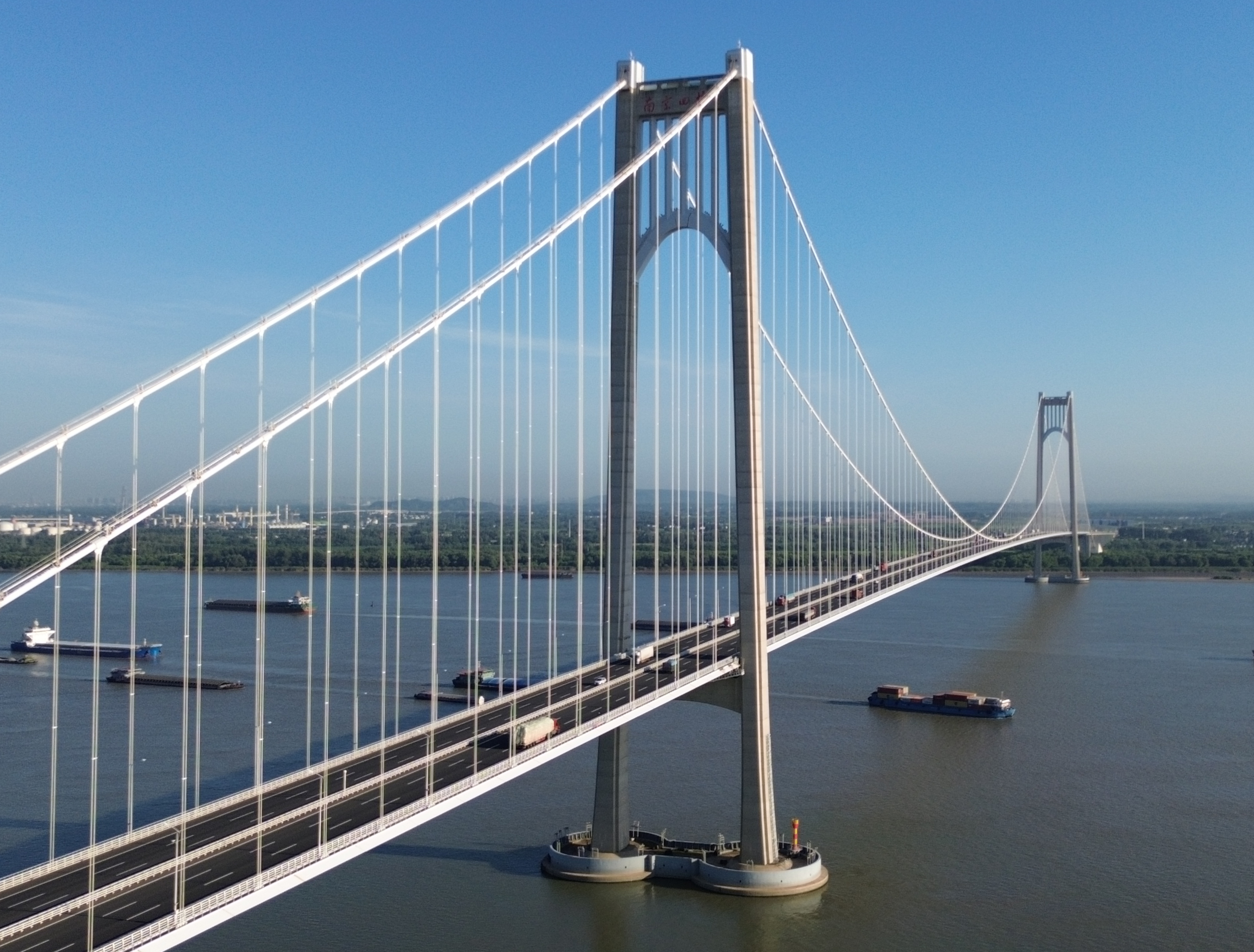
- Coordinates: 32.1780°N 118.9401°E
- Carries: G25 and G2503
- Crosses: Yangtze River
- Locale: Nanjing, Jiangsu, China

Characteristics
- Design: Suspension bridge
- Total length: 5,437 m (17,838 ft)
- Width: 34.0 m (112 ft)
- Height: 229.4 m (753 ft)
- Longest span: 1,418 m (4,652 ft)

History
- Construction cost: 6.8 billion yuan
- Opened: December 24, 2012

Location
- Interactive map of Nanjing Qixiashan Yangtze River Bridge

The Nanjing Qixiashan Yangtze River Bridge, formerly Fourth Nanjing Yangtze Bridge, is a suspension bridge over the Yangtze River in Nanjing, China. The bridge is one of the longest span in the world. The bridge has renamed on 20 December 2019.

Jiangsu province's first suspension bridge, it lies 10 km downstream of the second Yangtze River Bridge. The bridge connects Hengliang town, a section of Nanjing Raoyue, Nanjing-Nantong Highway, Hongguang village, towns like Long Pao, Xianling and Qilin in Jiangning District, and a section of Raoyue and Shanghai-Nanjing Highway.

The 4th Nanjing Yangtze twin-tower bridge fashioned after standard expressway, boasts dual six-lane carriageway designed to maintain a 100–125 km an hour traffic.

== See also ==
- Bridges and tunnels across the Yangtze River
- List of bridges in China
- List of longest suspension bridge spans
- List of tallest bridges
