= Nanjing Yangtze River Bridge =

Bridge in Nanjing, China

Nanjing Yangtze River Bridge 南京长江大桥
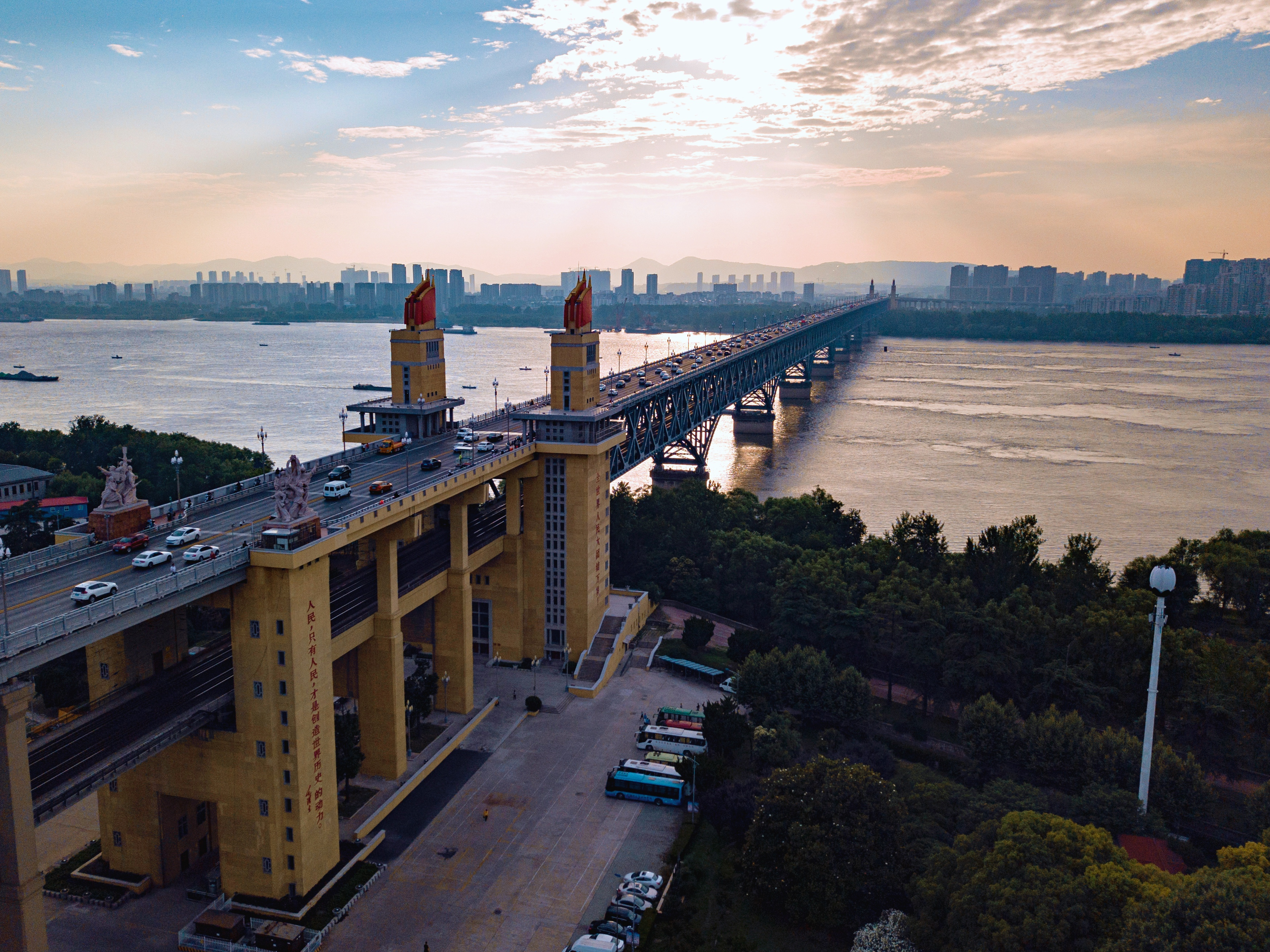
- Nanjing Yangtze River Bridge, looking from the southeast bank to the northwest view.
- Coordinates: 32.1152°N 118.7388°E
- Carries: Beijing–Shanghai railway; Nanjing–Xi'an railway; Nanjing–Qidong railway; National Highway 104
- Crosses: Yangtze River
- Locale: Nanjing, Jiangsu; China
- Owner: People's Government of Nanjing; Shanghai Railway Bureau

Characteristics
- Design: double-deck truss bridge
- Material: Steel
- Total length: Main Bridge: 1,576 metres (5,171 ft); Highway: 4,588 metres (15,052 ft); Railway: 6,772 metres (22,218 ft)
- Width: Highway Bridge: 19.5 metres (64 ft) (with 4.5 metres (15 ft) pedestrian path); Railway: 14 metres (46 ft)
- Height: 70 metres (230 ft)
- Longest span: 160 metres (525 ft)
- No. of spans: 10
- Piers in water: 9
- Clearance below: 24 metres (79 ft)

History
- Designer: Ministry of Railways
- Construction start: 18 January 1960
- Construction end: Railway: 30 September 1968; Highway: 29 December 1968
- Replaces: Yangtze River Railway Ferry

Statistics
- Daily traffic: 80,000 vehicles 200 pairs of trains ^{(2011)}

Location
- Interactive map of Nanjing Yangtze River Bridge

The Nanjing Yangtze River Bridge (simplified Chinese: 南京长江大桥; traditional Chinese: 南京長江大橋; pinyin: Nánjīng Chángjiāng Dàqiáo), previously called the First Nanjing Yangtze Bridge, is a double-decked road-rail truss bridge across the Yangtze River in Nanjing, Jiangsu, China connecting the city's Pukou and Gulou districts. Its upper deck is part of China National Highway 104, spanning 4,588 metres (15,052 ft). Its lower deck, with a double-track railway, is 6,772 metres (22,218 ft) long, and completes the Beijing–Shanghai railway, which had been divided by the Yangtze for decades. Its right bridge consists of nine piers, with the maximum span of 160 metres (525 ft) and the total length of 1,576 metres (5,171 ft). The bridge carries approximately 80,000 vehicles and 190 trains per day.

The bridge was completed and open for traffic in 1968. It was the third bridge over the Yangtze after the Wuhan Yangtze River Bridge and the Chongqing Baishatuo Yangtze River Bridge. It was the first heavy bridge designed and built using Chinese expertise.

== Suicide site ==
According to state media, the Nanjing Yangtze River Bridge surpassed the Golden Gate Bridge as the most frequent suicide site in the world, with more than 2,000 suicides estimated by 2006.

People who have survived the jump have had severe consequences including paralysis, organ damage, broken bones and lifelong pain. Many assume that the jump will cause instant death, but it is not uncommon for jumpers to die from other causes, such as drowning or hypothermia after hitting the cold waters.

== Gallery ==
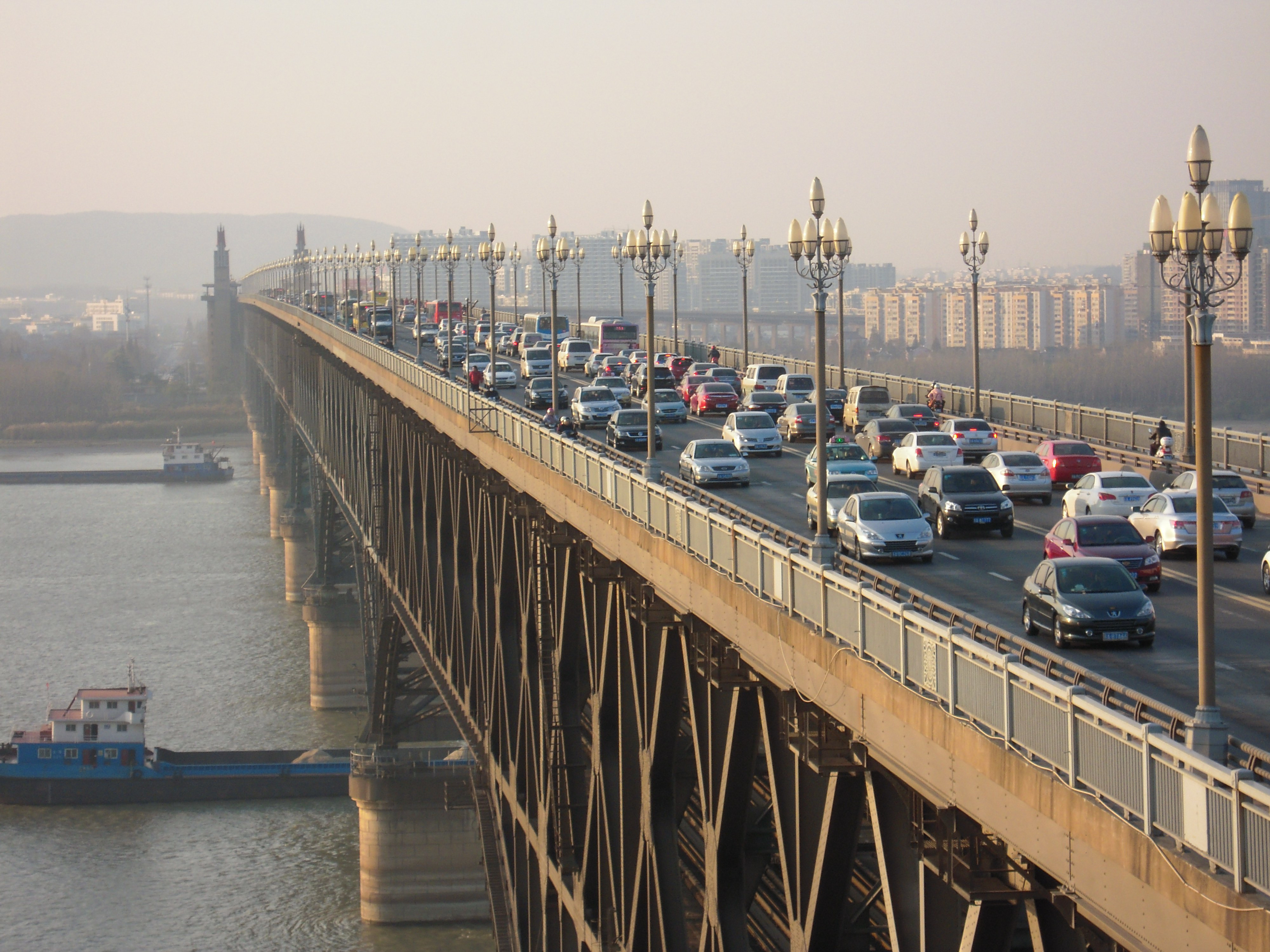
Vehicles on the Nanjing Yangtze River Bridge

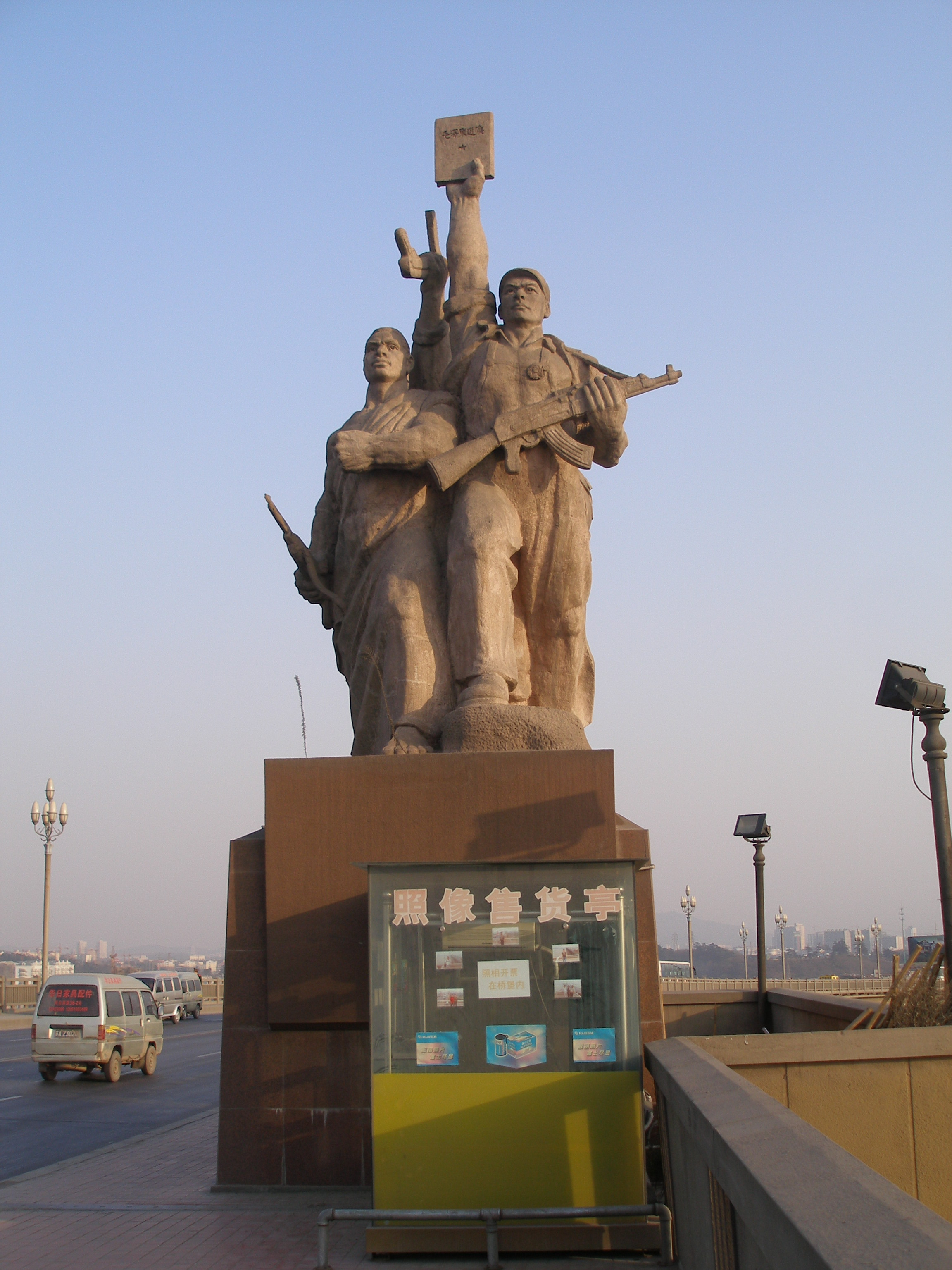
Statue of first Yangtze river bridge at Nanjing

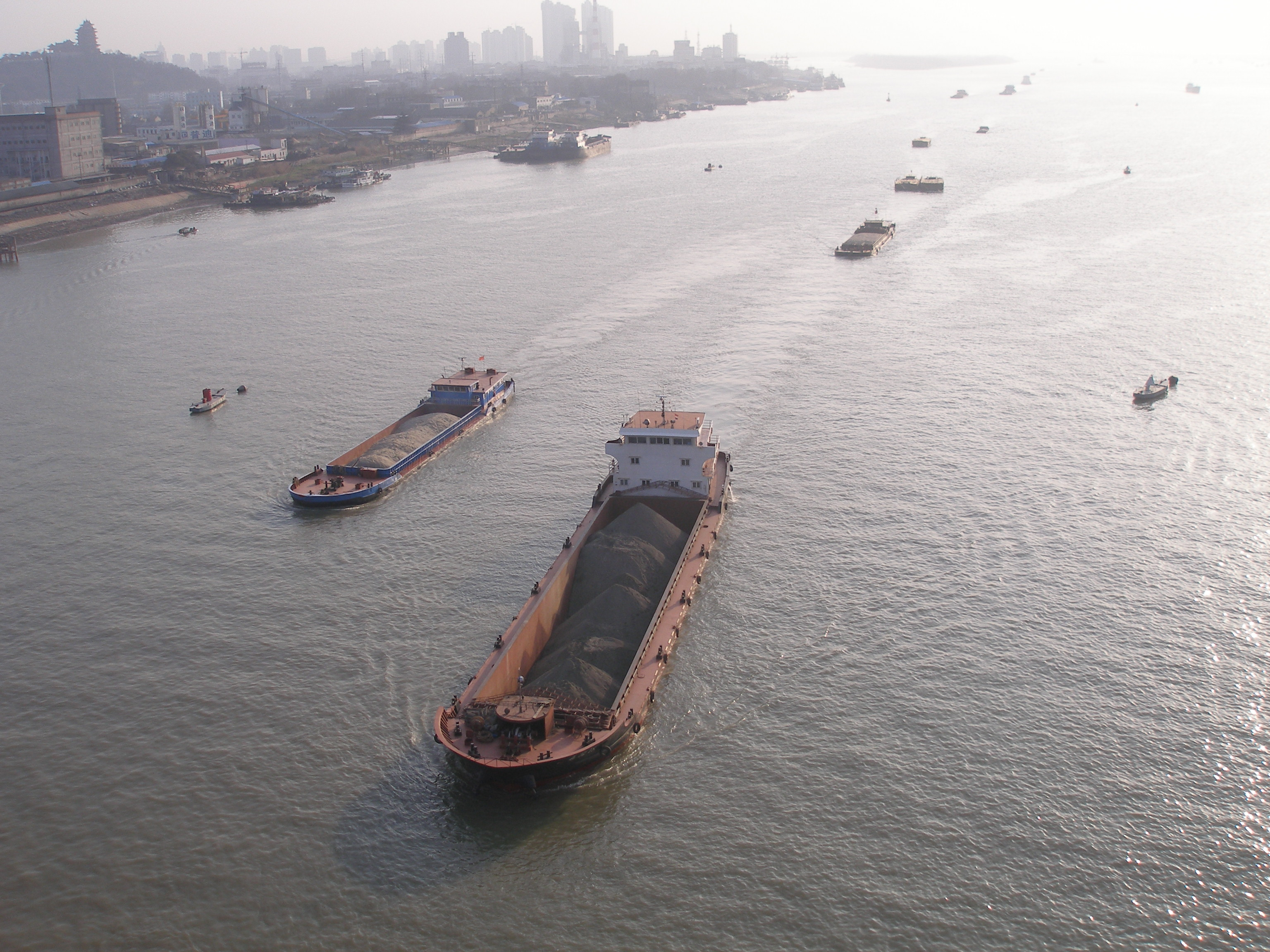
Scenery on the Yangtze river

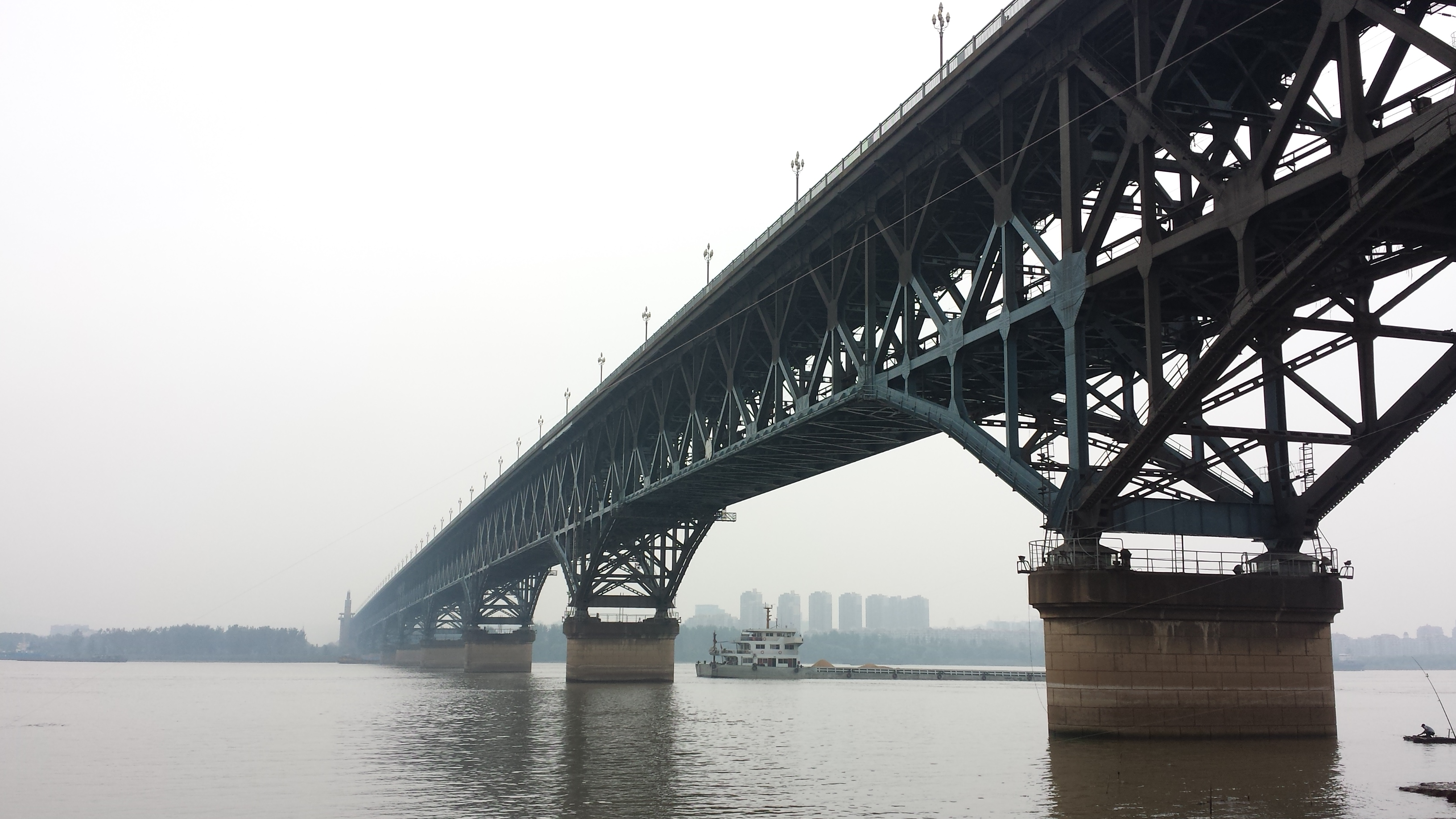
Nanjing Yangtze River Bridge seen from the upstream right bank

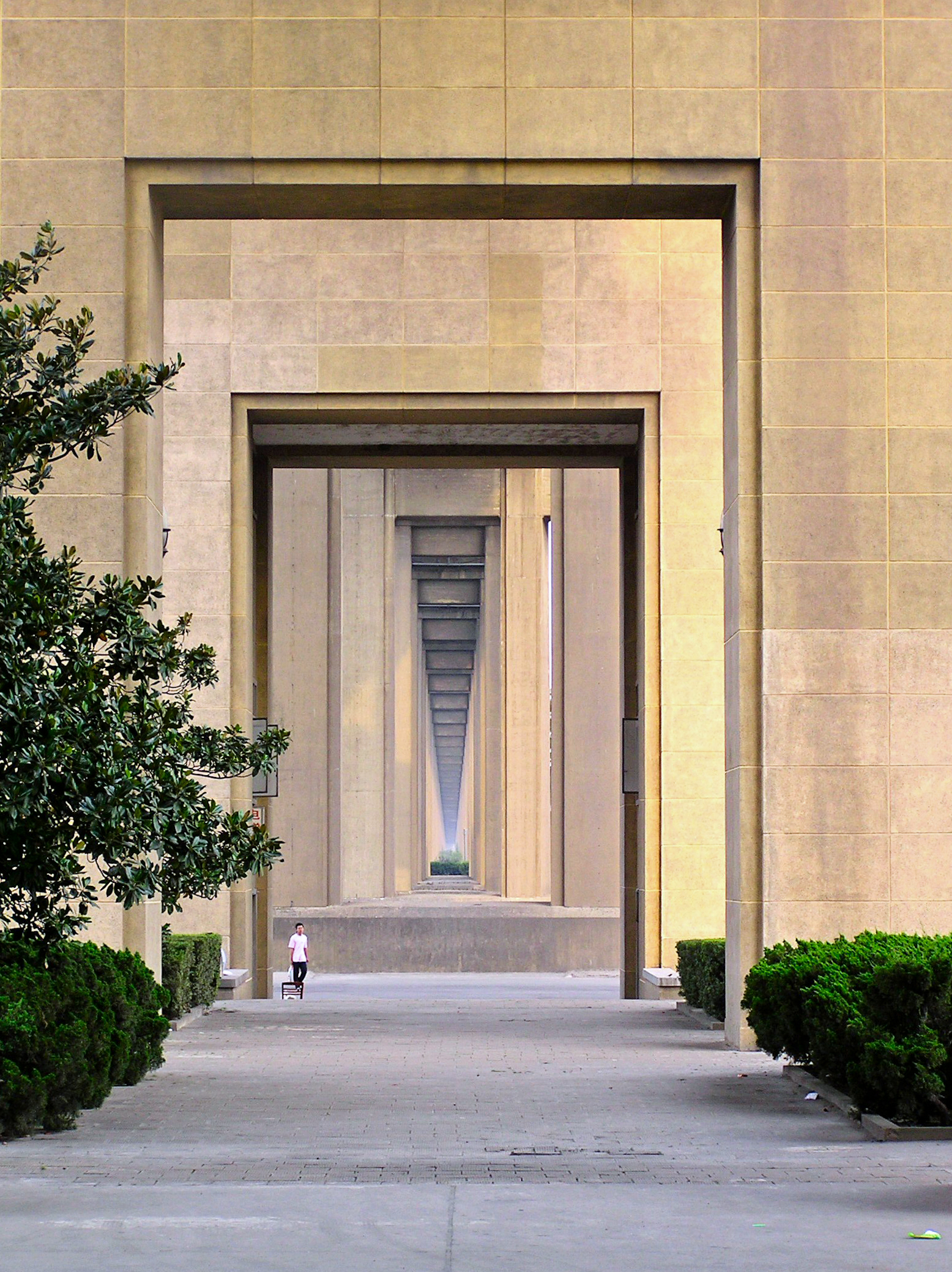
Perspective of the double-column frame piers of the railway bridge approach structure

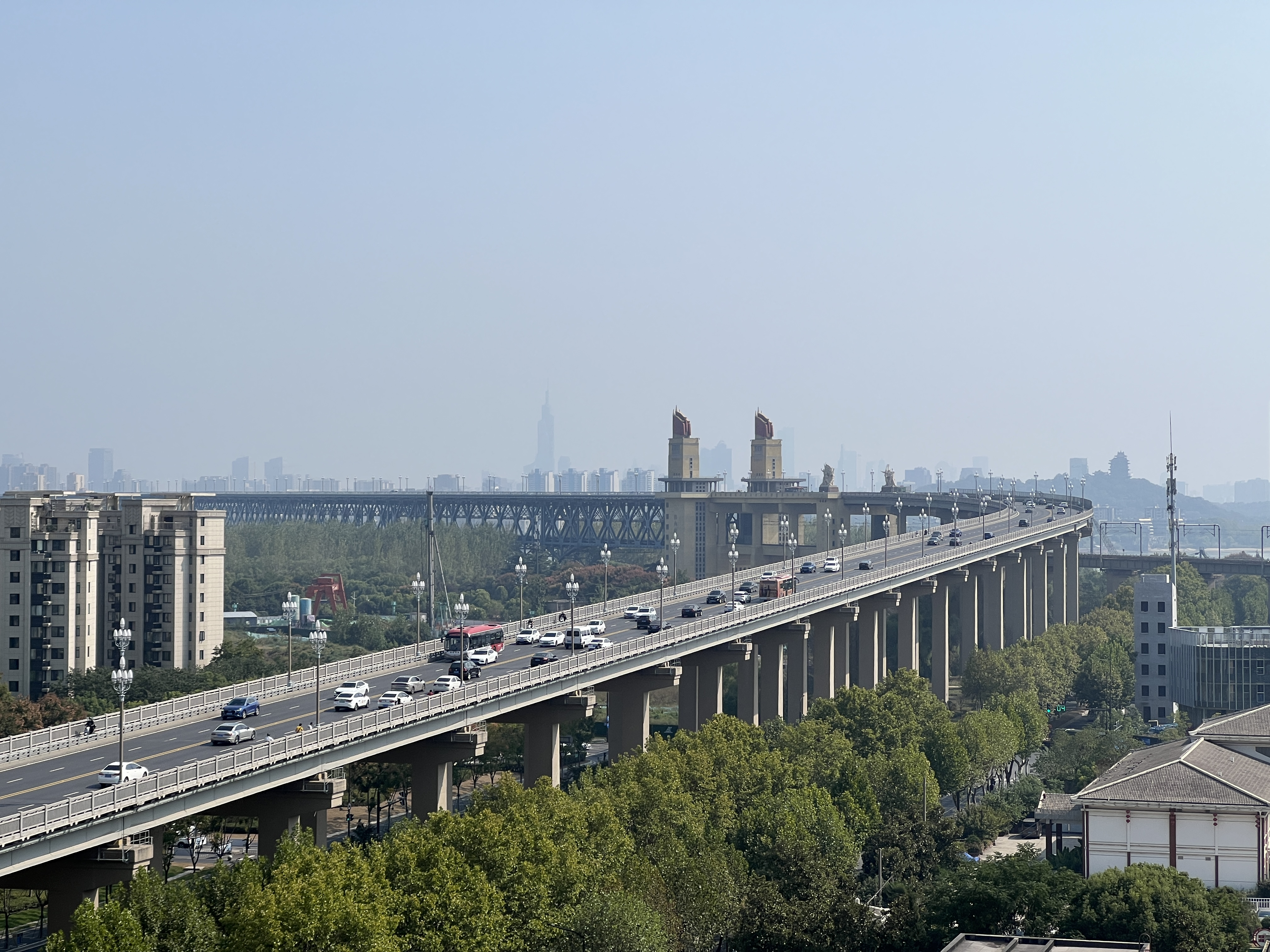
The Nanjing Yangtze Bridge in 2022

== See also ==
- Dashengguan Yangtze River Bridge, Nanjing's other railway bridge that carries the Beijing–Shanghai High-Speed Railway.
- Yangtze River bridges and tunnels
- List of bridges in China
- Beijing–Shanghai Railway
- Rail transport in China
- Passenger rail transport in China
