= Bianyuzhou Yangtze River Railway Bridge =

Bianyuzhou Yangtze River Railway Bridge 鳊鱼洲长江铁路大桥
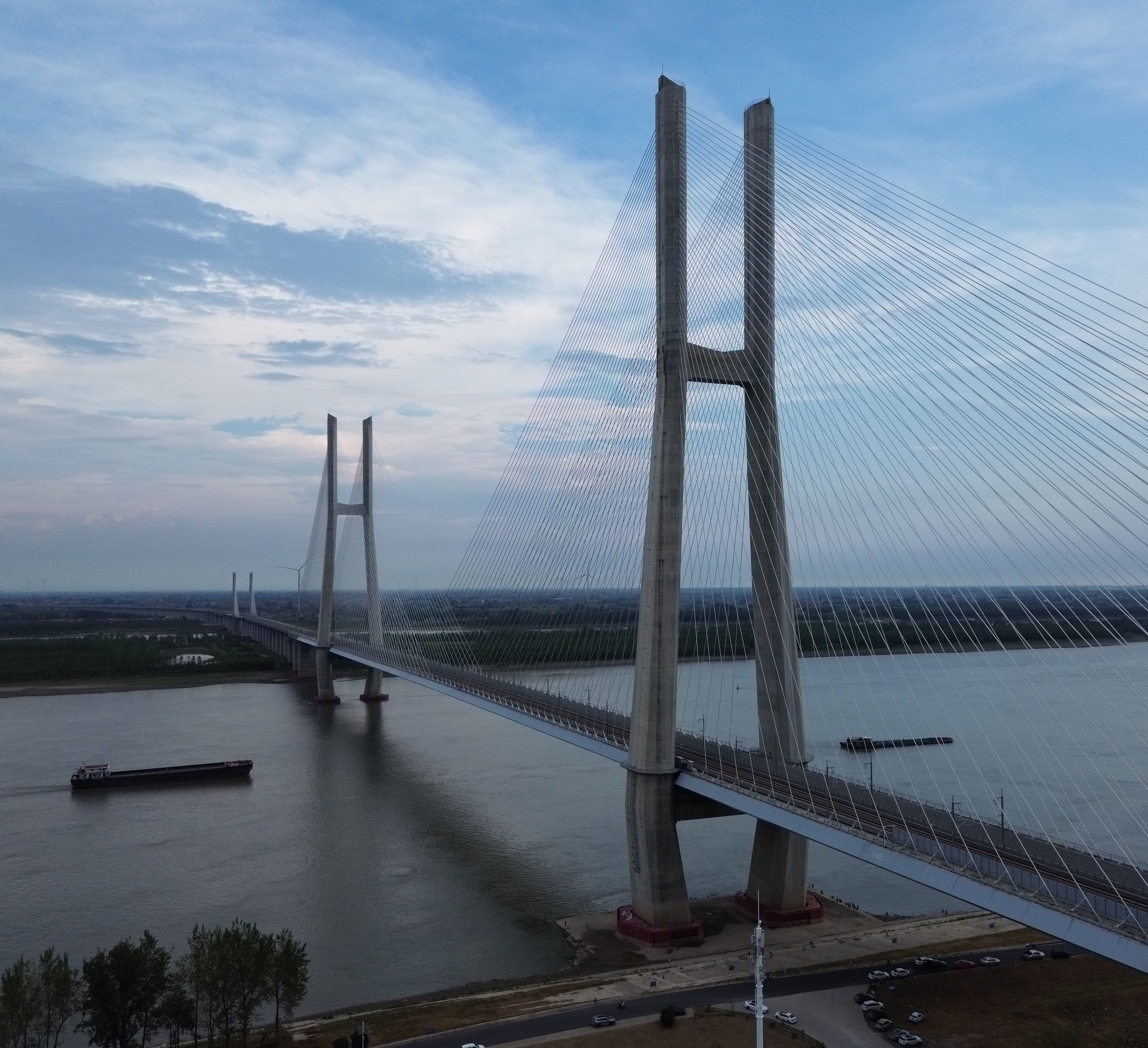
- The bridge in August 2025 from the Jiujiang side
- Coordinates: 29°44′25″N 115°51′32″E
- Carries: Beijing–Hong Kong (Taipei) corridor
- Crosses: Yangtze River
- Locale: Jiujiang, Jiangxi–Huangmei County, Hubei, China
- Preceded by: Guangrui Yangtze River Bridge
- Followed by: Jiujiang Yangtze River Expressway Bridge

Characteristics
- Design: Cable-stayed bridge
- Material: Steel, concrete
- Total length: 3.996 km (2.483 mi)
- Width: 32.5 m (107 ft)
- Height: north tower 252 m (827 ft) south tower 242 m (794 ft)
- Longest span: 672 m (2,205 ft)

History
- Designer: China Railway Bridge Survey and Design Institute
- Constructed by: China Railway Bridge Bureau Group
- Construction start: 12 October 2017
- Opened: 30 December 2021

Location
- Interactive map of Bianyuzhou Yangtze River Railway Bridge

The Bianyuzhou Yangtze River Railway Bridge (Chinese: 鳊鱼洲长江铁路大桥) is a bridge over the Yangtze River between Jiujiang, Jiangxi and Huangmei County, Hubei, China. The bridge is one of the longest cable-stayed railway bridge in the world when it opened in 2021.

== See also ==
- Bridges and tunnels across the Yangtze River
- List of bridges in China
- List of longest cable-stayed bridge spans
- List of tallest bridges
