= Jiayu Yangtze River Bridge =

Cable-stayed bridge, China

Jiayu Yangtze River Bridge 嘉鱼长江大桥
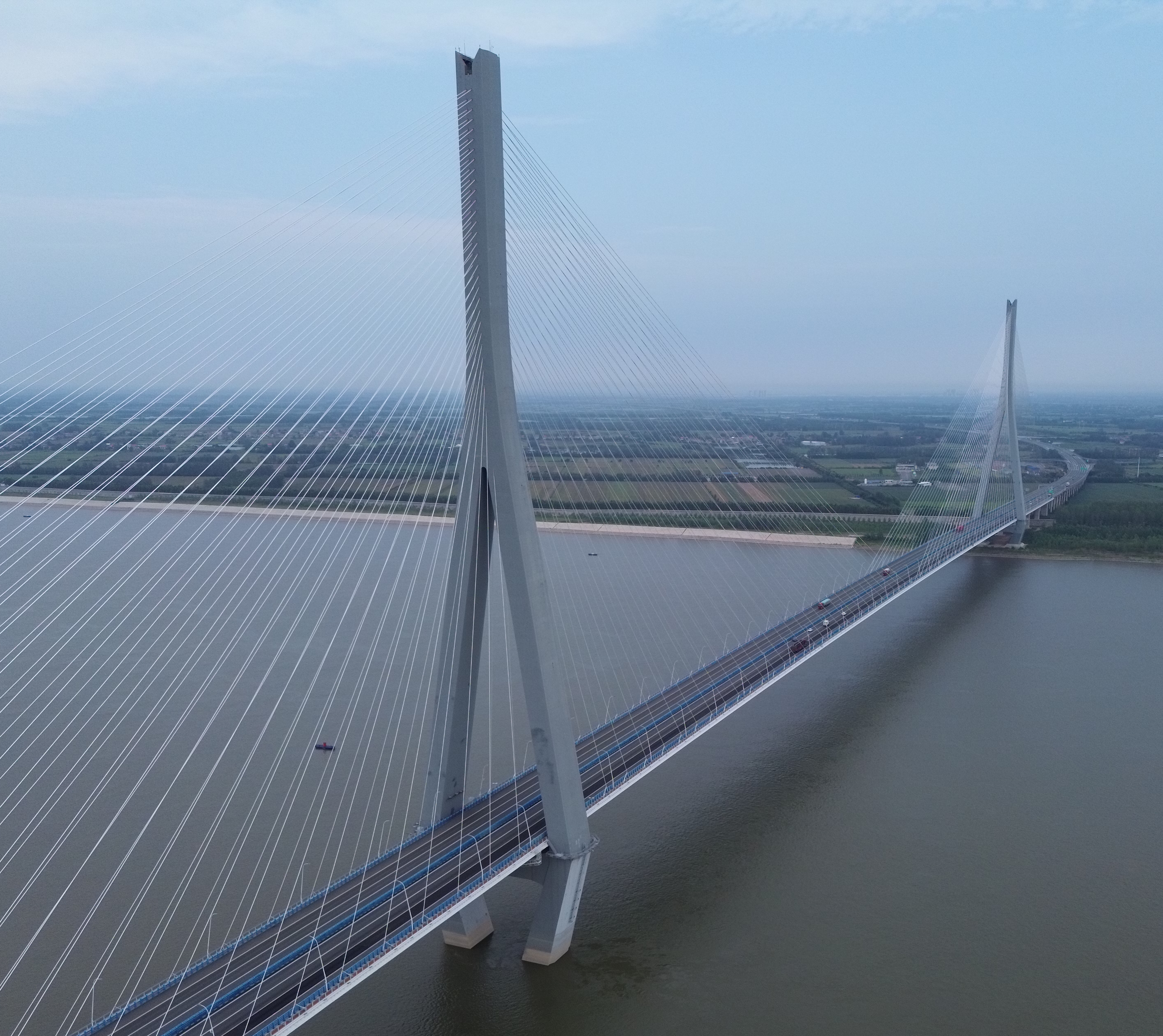
- Coordinates: 30°03′12″N 113°58′01″E
- Carries: Hubei S43; Hubei S78
- Crosses: Yangtze River
- Locale: Honghu–Jiayu County, Hubei, China

Characteristics
- Design: Cable-stayed
- Material: Steel, concrete
- Total length: 4,650 m (15,256 ft)
- Width: 38.5 m (126 ft)
- Height: 235 m (771 ft) (north tower); 251.41 m (824.8 ft) (south tower)
- Longest span: 920 m (3,018 ft)

History
- Construction start: 23 February 2016
- Inaugurated: 28 November 2019

Location
- Interactive map of Jiayu Yangtze River Bridge

The Jiayu Yangtze River Bridge (Chinese: 嘉鱼长江大桥) is a cable-stayed bridge that links Honghu and Jiayu County in Hubei province, it crosses the Yangtze river between the Chibi Yangtze River Bridge upstream and the Wuhan Junshan Yangtze River Bridge downstream.

When it opened, it is one of the longest cable-stayed bridge with a 920 metres (3,020 ft) main spans.

== See also ==
- Bridges and tunnels across the Yangtze River
- List of bridges in China
- List of longest cable-stayed bridge spans
- List of tallest bridges in the world
