= Guanyinsi Yangtze River Bridge =

Guanyinsi Yangtze River Bridge 观音寺长江大桥
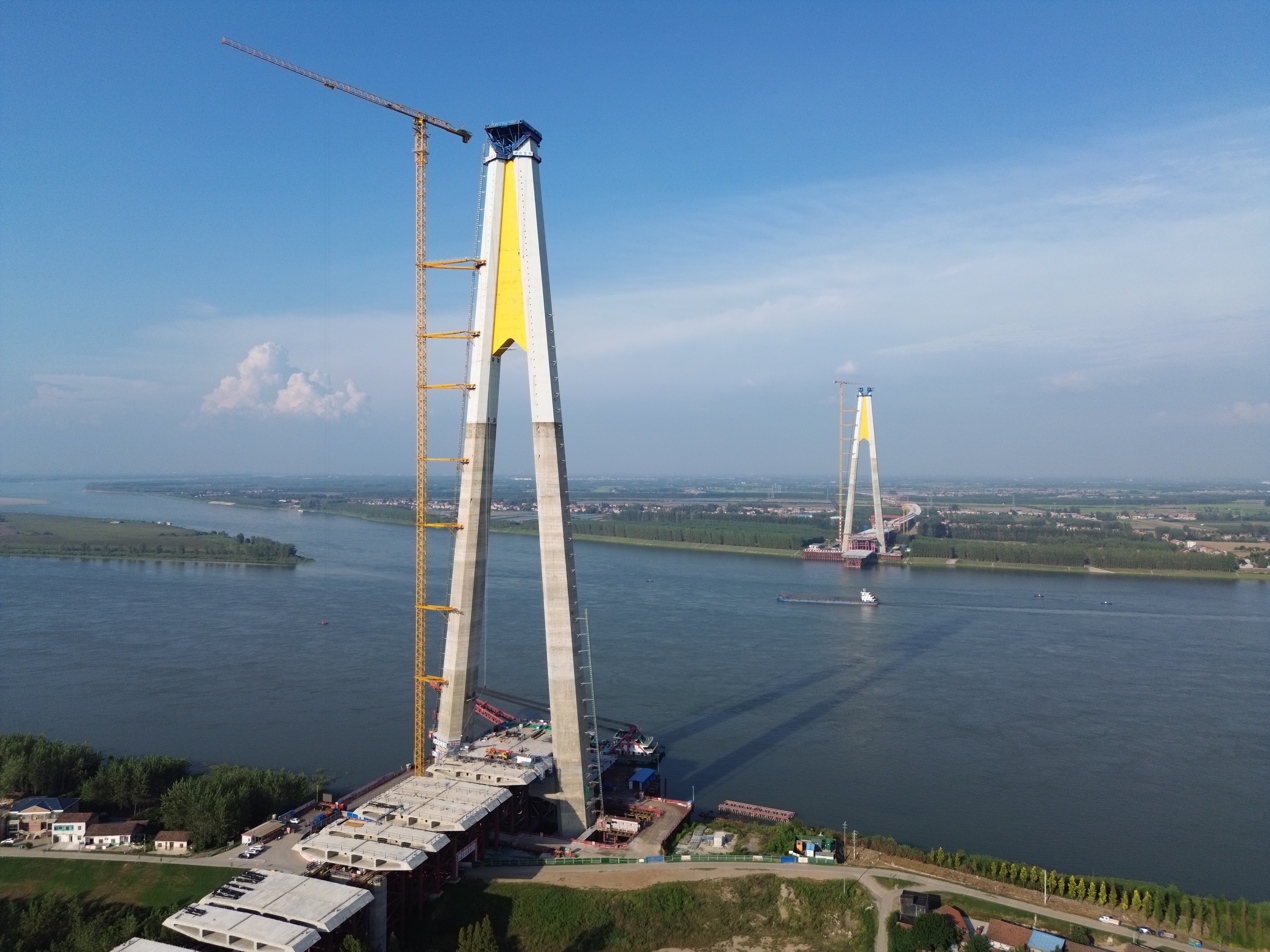
- Coordinates: 30°06′17″N 112°12′13″E
- Carries: Wuhan-Songzi Expressway
- Crosses: Yangtze River
- Locale: Gong'an County–Jiangling County, Hubei, China

Characteristics
- Design: Cable-stayed bridge
- Width: 41 m (135 ft)
- Height: 262 m (860 ft)
- Longest span: 1,160 m (3,810 ft)
- No. of lanes: 6
- Capacity: 120 km/h (75 mph)

History
- Constructed by: China Railway Construction Bridge Bureau
- Construction end: 2026
- Construction cost: CN¥ 15.186 billion

Location
- Interactive map of Guanyinsi Yangtze River Bridge

The Guanyinsi Yangtze River Bridge (Chinese: 观音寺长江大桥) is a cable-stayed bridge spanning the Yangtze River near Gong'an County, Hubei in China. It will be the second longest cable-stayed bridge in the world when completed with a main span of 1,160 m (3,810 ft).

The bridge is about 31.3 kilometres (19.4 mi) from the upstream Jingzhou Yangtze River Bridge and about 13.7 kilometres (8.5 mi) from the lower Gong'an Yangtze River Bridge.

== See also ==
- Bridges and tunnels across the Yangtze River
- List of bridges in China
- List of longest cable-stayed bridge spans
- List of tallest bridges in the world
