= Third Tongling Yangtze River Bridge =

Third Tongling Yangtze River Bridge 铜陵长江三桥
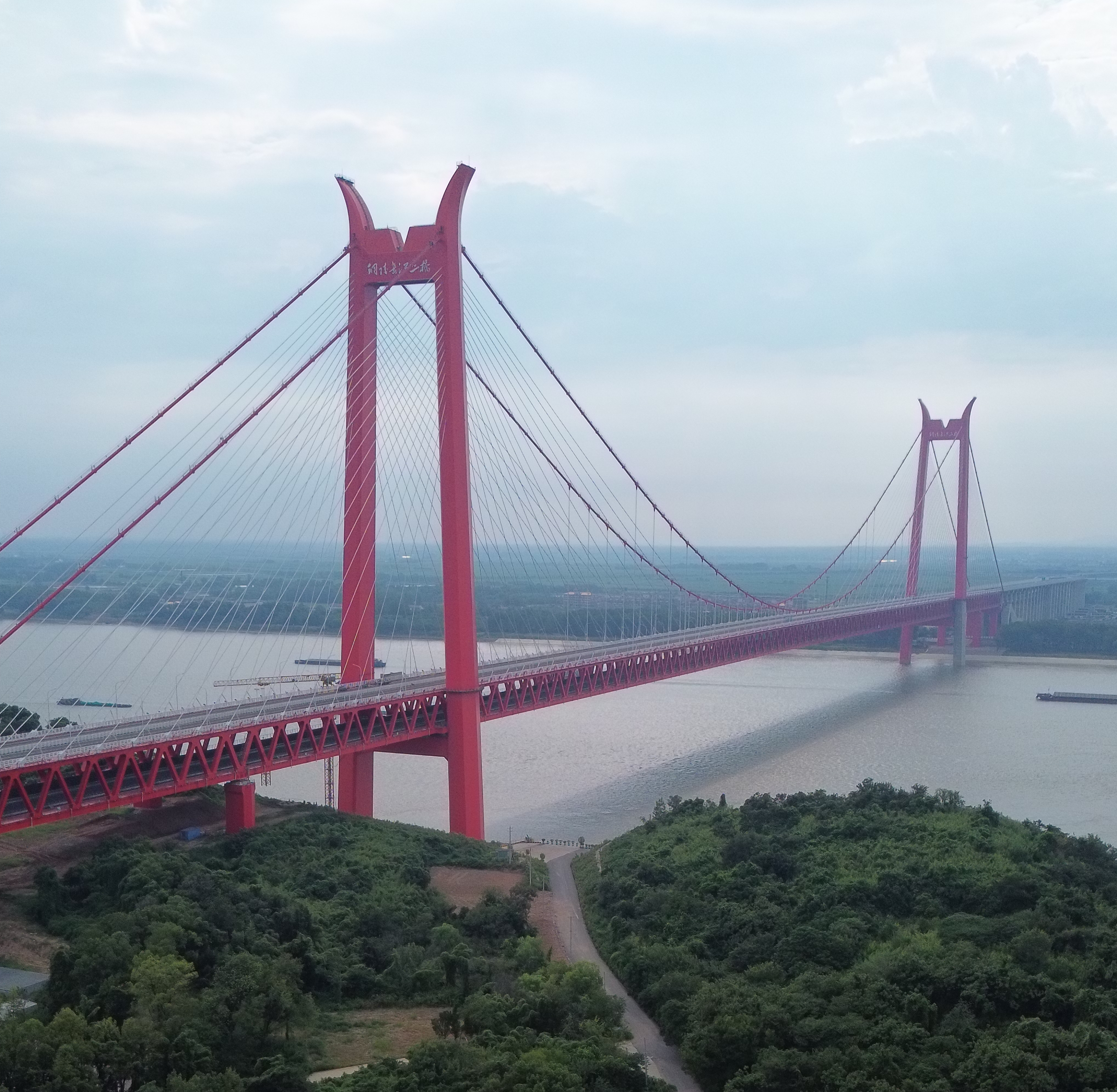
- The bridge in August 2025 from the Tongling side
- Coordinates: 30°51′02″N 117°43′28″E
- Carries: G3 – Beijing, Taipei; Hewen HSR; Tongling Rail Transit
- Crosses: Yangtze River
- Locale: Tongling, Anhui, China
- Preceded by: Chizhou Yangtze River Rail-Road Bridge
- Followed by: Tongling Yangtze River Bridge

Characteristics
- Design: double deck cable-stayed suspension bridge
- Material: Steel, concrete
- Total length: 11.877 km (7.380 mi)
- Width: 35 m (115 ft)
- Height: west tower 253.5 m (832 ft) east tower 247.5 m (812 ft)
- Longest span: 988 m (3,241 ft)

History
- Architect: Tongling Comprehensive Transportation Investment Group Co., Ltd.
- Designer: China Railway Bridge Institute
- Constructed by: China Railway Bridge Bureau
- Construction start: 4 January 2022
- Opened: 6 November 2025 (road)

Location
- Interactive map of Third Tongling Yangtze River Bridge

The Third Tongling Yangtze River Bridge (Chinese: 铜陵长江三桥), also called G3 Tongling Yangtze River Highway-Railway Bridge (Chinese: G3铜陵长江公铁大桥), is a bridge over the Yangtze River in Tongling, Anhui, China. The bridge is the longest two levels cable-stayed suspension bridge in the world when it opened in 2025.

The two other Yangtze crossings in Tongling are the Tongling Yangtze River Bridge and the Tongling Yangtze River Road-railway Bridge.

== Structure ==
The deck superstructure is a two levels truss deck 35-metre (115 ft) wide that accommodates three lanes of traffic in each direction on the upper level. The lower level has two railway tracks with a design speed of 120 kilometres per hour (75 mph) on the upstream side and two railway tracks with a design speed of 250 kilometres per hour (160 mph) on the upstream side.

The span arrangement is 127.5–131–988–131–127.5 metres (418–430–3,241–430–418 ft).

== See also ==
- Bridges and tunnels across the Yangtze River
- List of bridges in China
- List of longest suspension bridge spans
- List of tallest bridges
