= Chizhou Yangtze River Rail-Road Bridge =

Chizhou Yangtze River Rail-Road Bridge 池州長江公鐵大橋
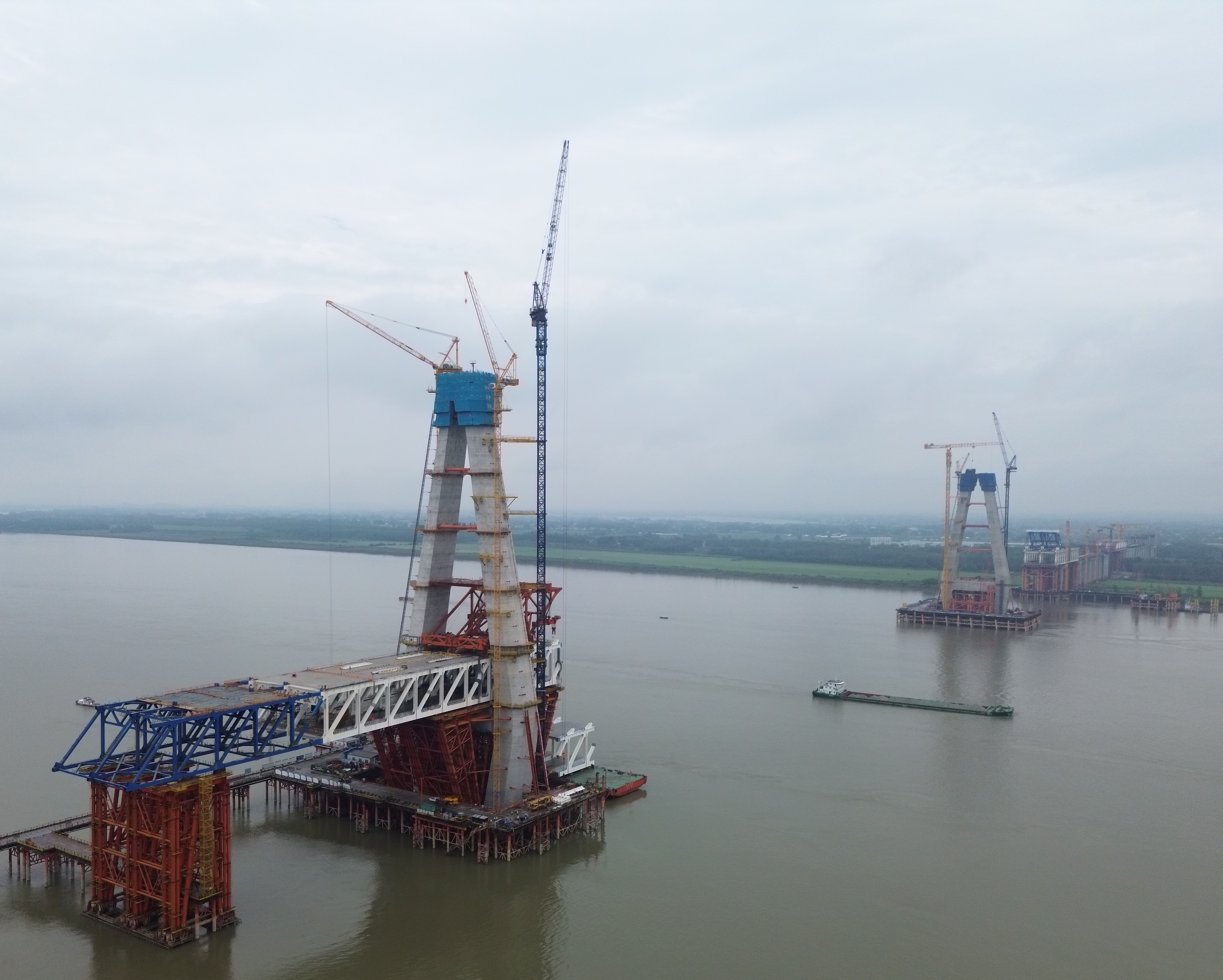
- The bridge in August 2025 from the Chizhou side
- Coordinates: 30°45′28″N 117°34′31″E
- Carries: S40 Ningfeng Expressway; Hefei to Chizhou Railway
- Crosses: Yangtze River
- Locale: Chizhou, Anhui, China
- Preceded by: Chizhou Yangtze River Bridge
- Followed by: Third Tongling Yangtze River Bridge

Characteristics
- Design: double deck cable-stayed bridge
- Material: Steel, concrete
- Total length: 3,116 m (10,223 ft)
- Width: 39.9 m (131 ft)
- Height: 286 m (938 ft)
- Longest span: 812 m (2,664 ft)

History
- Construction start: 25 March 2023

Location
- Interactive map of Chizhou Yangtze River Rail-Road Bridge

The Chizhou Yangtze River Rail-Road Bridge (Chinese: 池州長江公鐵大橋) is an under construction bridge over the Yangtze River in Chizhou, Anhui, China. The bridge is one of the longest two levels cable-stayed bridge in the world.

== Structure ==
The deck superstructure is a two levels truss deck 39.9 metres (131 ft) wide that accommodates three lanes of traffic in each direction on the upper level. The lower level has two railway tracks with a design speed of 160 kilometres per hour (99 mph) and two railway tracks with a design speed of 250 kilometres per hour (160 mph).

The span arrangement is 98–378–812–364–98 metres (322–1,240–2,664–1,194–322 ft).

== See also ==
- Bridges and tunnels across the Yangtze River
- List of bridges in China
- List of longest cable-stayed bridge spans
- List of tallest bridges
