= Bailizhou Yangtze River Bridge =

Bailizhou Yangtze River Bridge 百里洲长江大桥
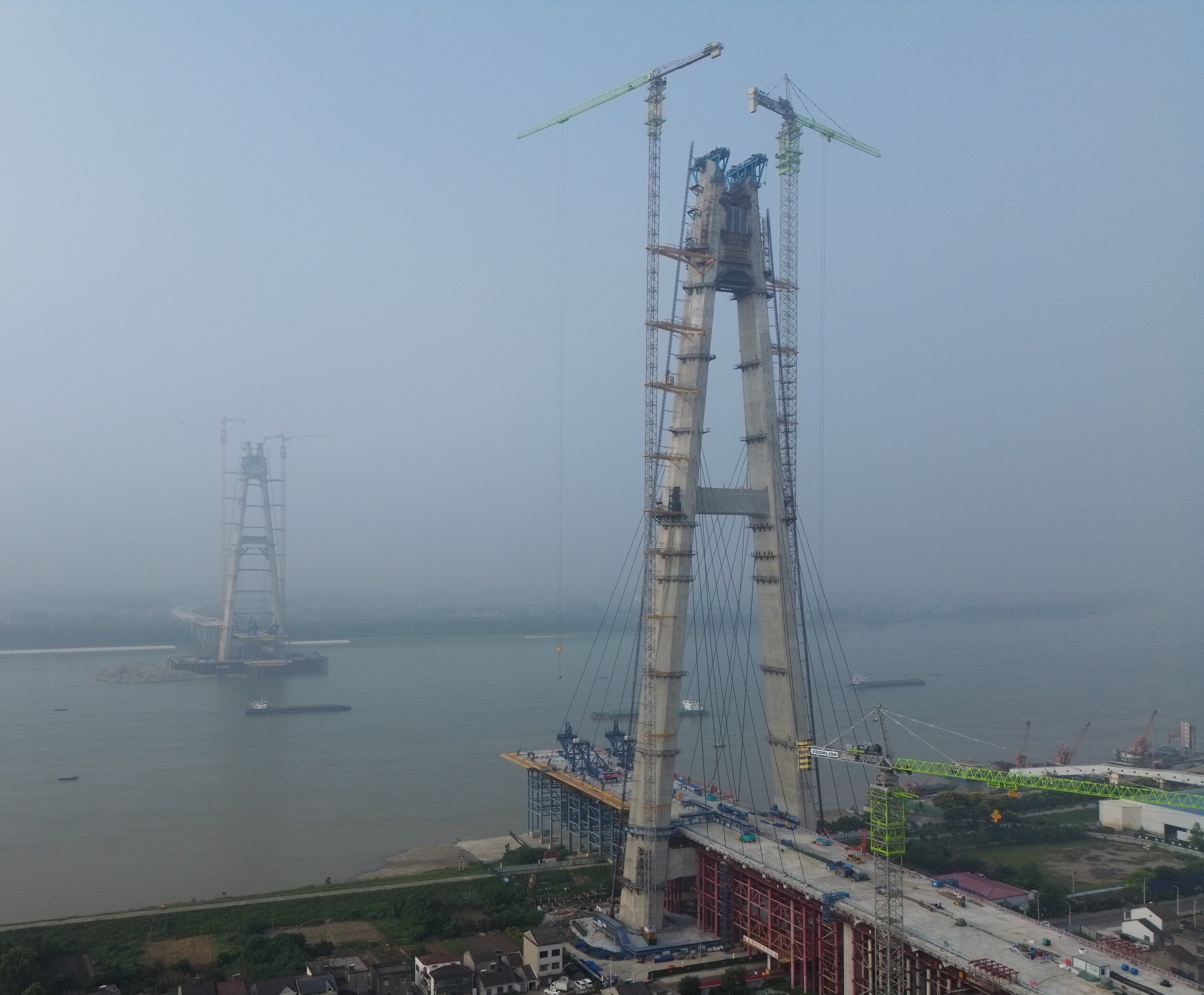
- The bridge in September 2025 from the Zhijiang side
- Coordinates: 30°25′1″N 111°46′36″E
- Carries: Dangzhisong Expressway; Provincial Highway 253
- Crosses: Yangtze River
- Locale: Zhijiang, Hubei, China
- Preceded by: Zhicheng Yangtze River Bridge
- Followed by: Libu Yangtze River Rail/Road Bridge

Characteristics
- Design: Cable-stayed bridge
- Material: Steel, concrete
- Total length: 1,549 m (5,082 ft)
- Height: 241 m (791 ft)
- Longest span: 890 m (2,920 ft)

History
- Constructed by: Sichuan Road & Bridge Group Co., Ltd.

Location
- Interactive map of Bailizhou Yangtze River Bridge

The Bailizhou Yangtze River Bridge (Chinese: 百里洲长江大桥) is an under construction bridge over the Yangtze River in Zhijiang, Hubei, China. The bridge is one of the longest cable-stayed bridges in the world with a main span of 890 m (2,920 ft).

== See also ==
- Bridges and tunnels across the Yangtze River
- List of bridges in China
- List of longest cable-stayed bridge spans
- List of tallest bridges
