= Third Wanzhou Yangtze River Bridge =

Cable-stayed bridge, China

Third Wanzhou Yangtze River Bridge 万州长江三桥
- Coordinates: 30°47′25″N 108°23′49″E
- Crosses: Yangtze River
- Locale: Wanzhou, Chongqing, China

Characteristics
- Design: Cable-stayed
- Material: Steel, concrete
- Height: 208.2 m (683 ft) (west tower); 248.1 m (814 ft) (east tower)
- Longest span: 730 m (2,395 ft)

History
- Construction start: 15 January 2012
- Construction end: 30 May 2019

Location
- Interactive map of Third Wanzhou Yangtze River Bridge

The Third Wanzhou Yangtze River Bridge (Chinese: 万州长江三桥) or the Pailou Yangtze River Bridge (Chinese: 牌楼长江大桥) is a cable-stayed bridge over the Yangtze river in Wanzhou, Chongqing.

== See also ==
- Wanzhou Yangtze River Bridge
- Second Wanzhou Yangtze River Bridge
- Wanzhou Railway Bridge
- Bridges and tunnels across the Yangtze River
- List of bridges in China
- List of longest cable-stayed bridge spans
- List of tallest bridges in the world
