= Wuhan Zhuankou Yangtze River Bridge =

Bridge in People's Republic of China

Wuhan Zhuankou Yangtze River Bridge 沌口长江大桥
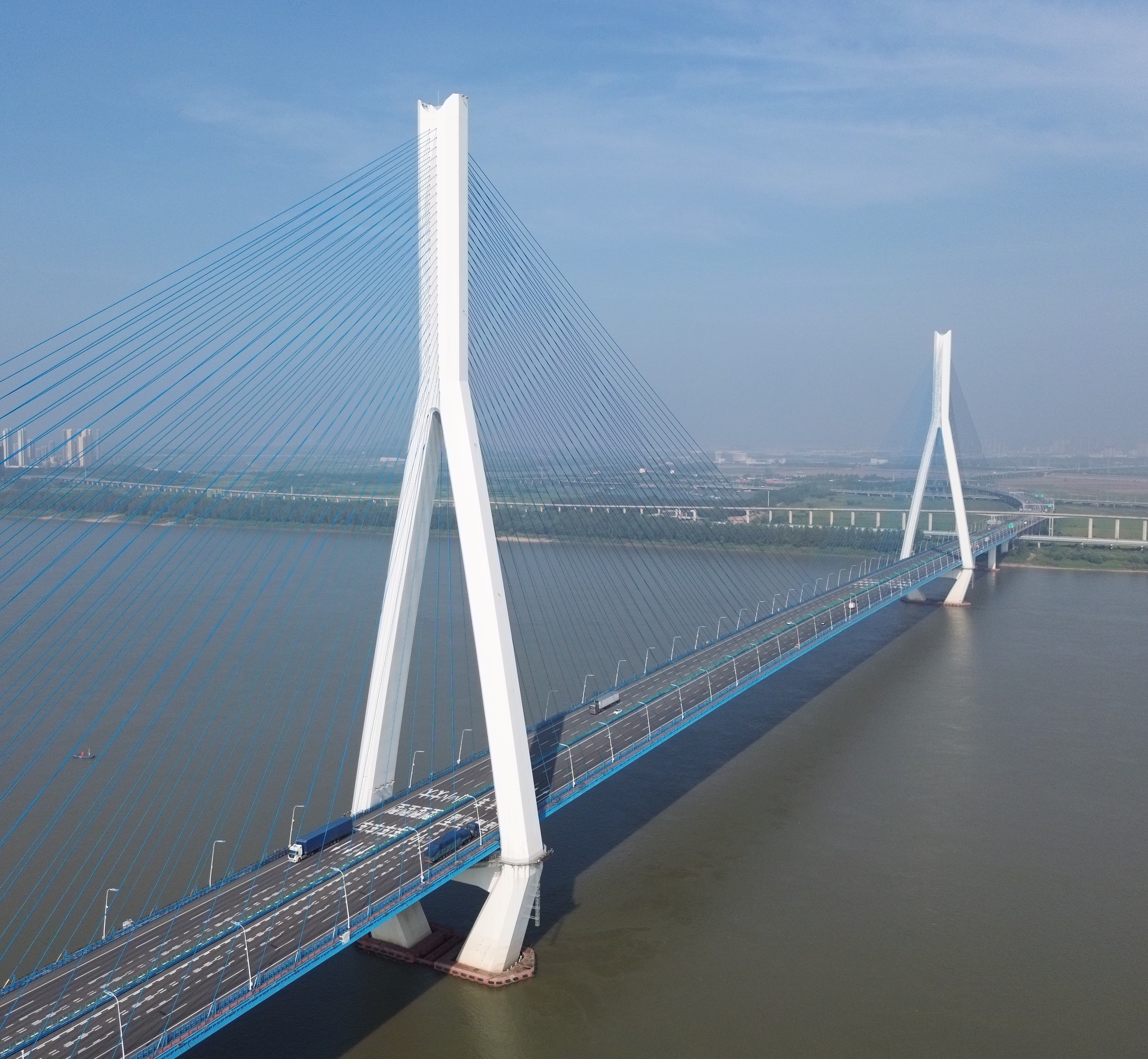
- Coordinates: 30°26′04″N 114°11′09″E
- Crosses: Yangtze River
- Locale: Wuhan, Hubei, China

Characteristics
- Design: Cable-stayed
- Total length: 5,296 m (17,375 ft)
- Width: 46 m (151 ft)
- Height: 233.7 m (767 ft)
- Longest span: 760 m (2,493 ft)

History
- Construction start: 8 October 2014
- Construction end: 28 December 2017

Location
- Interactive map of Wuhan Zhuankou Yangtze River Bridge

Wuhan Zhuankou Yangtze River Bridge, also known as Zhankou Yangtze River Highway Bridge, formerly known as Huangjiahu Yangtze River Bridge, Is a highway cable-stayed bridge located in Wuhan, Hubei, China, which crosses the Yangtze River and connects the Caidian District on the north shore of the Qingling Subdistrict (Hongshan District) of Xujiabao and the south bank are one of the important components and control engineering of Wuhan Fourth Ring Road, and Wuhan Junshan Yangtze River Bridge 9.2 kilometers, 7 kilometers from the Baishazhou Yangtze River Bridge downstream. The total length of the bridge is 5.296 kilometers. The main bridge structure is a five-span, one-twin, twin tower face steel box girder cable-stayed bridge with a main span of 760 meters and a bridge width of 46 meters.

== See also ==
- Bridges and tunnels across the Yangtze River
- List of bridges in China
- List of longest cable-stayed bridge spans
- List of tallest bridges in the world
