= Pingtang Bridge =

Bridge in southwestern China

Pingtang Bridge 平塘大桥
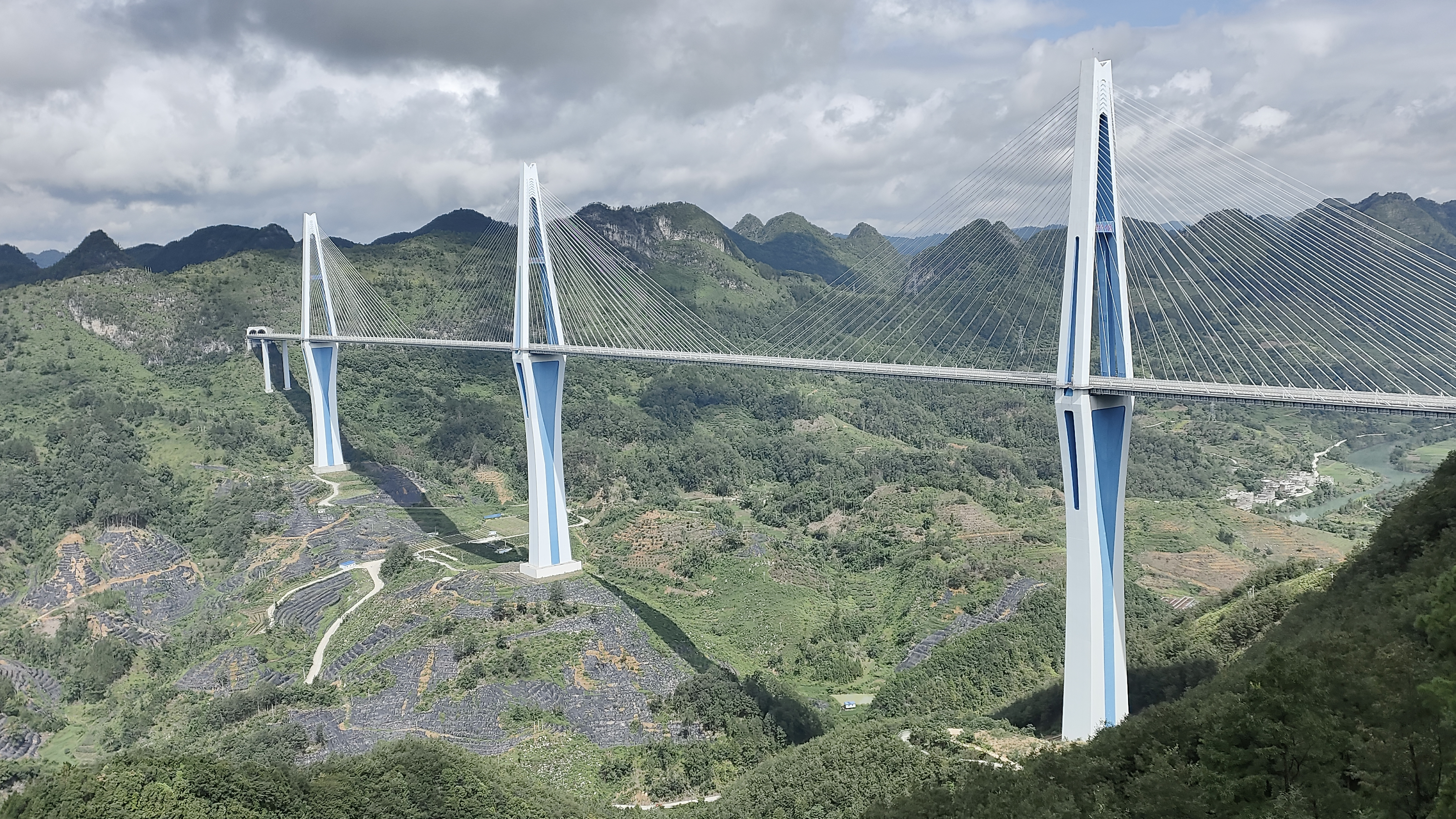
- The bridge in 2020, after its opening
- Coordinates: 25.786°N 107.056°E
- Carries: Pingtang Luodian Expressway
- Crosses: Caodu River
- Locale: Pingtang, Guizhou, China

Characteristics
- Design: Cable-stayed bridge
- Total length: 2,135 metres (7,005 ft)
- Width: 30.2 metres (99 ft)
- Height: 332 metres (1,089 ft)
- Longest span: 2×550 metres (1,800 ft)
- Clearance below: 310 metres (1,020 ft)

History
- Construction cost: 1.5 billion yuan (about 215 million U.S. dollars)
- Opened: 30 December 2019

Statistics
- Toll: Yes

Location
- Interactive map of Pingtang Bridge

The Pingtang Bridge is a bridge in Pingtang, Guizhou, China and carries the Pingtang Luodian Expressway over the deep Caodu River valley. With a height of 332 metres (1,089 ft), it is the third-tallest bridge in the world. It was opened to traffic on 30 December 2019.

== Structure ==
The bridge is a multi-span cable-stayed bridge with a length of 7,000 ft (2,100 m). With a main tower that has a height of 332 metres (1,089 ft), the bridge is the third tallest in the world. The tallest tower is 15 metres (49 ft) shorter than France's Millau Viaduct, which has a similar structure to the Pingtang Bridge. The bridge is also among the 20 highest in the world with a road deck 310 metres (1,020 ft) above the river below. The bridge cost 1.5 billion yuan (about 215 million U.S. dollars) to build.

== See also ==
- List of highest bridges
- List of tallest bridges
- List of longest cable-stayed bridge spans
