= Xiamen Zhangzhou Bridge =

Xiamen Zhangzhou Bridge 厦漳跨海大桥
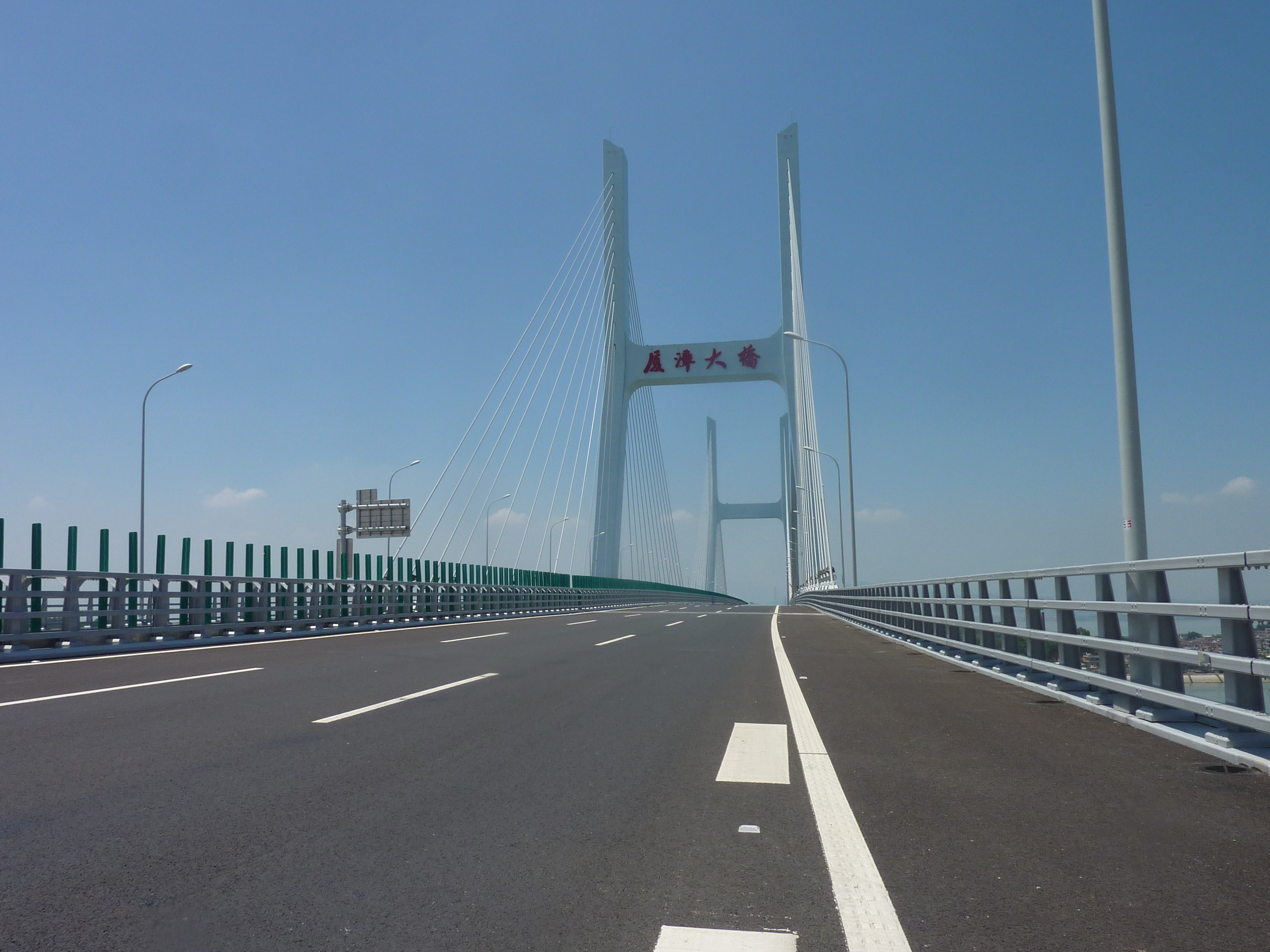
- View of south cable-stayed bridge
- Coordinates: 24°27′23″N 117°56′58″E
- Carries: 6 lane highway
- Crosses: Xiamen Bay / Jiulong River estuary
- Locale: Xiamen and Zhangzhou, Fujian
- Other name: Xiazhang Bridge

Characteristics
- Design: Cable-stayed
- Total length: 11.70 kilometres (7.27 mi)
- Height: 227 m (745 ft)
- Longest span: 780 m (2,559 ft)

History
- Construction start: August, 2009
- Opened: May 28, 2013

Statistics
- Toll: 25 yuan

Location
- Interactive map of Xiamen Zhangzhou Bridge

The Xiamen Zhangzhou Bridge is a 11.70 kilometres (7.27 mi) bridge across the Jiulong River estuary as the river enters Xiamen Bay.

The bridge's main cable-stayed bridge span is 780 metres (2,560 ft) long, the ninth longest in the world. The cable stayed section is supported by two 227-metre (745 ft) high towers. Construction of the bridge began in August 2009. The bridge was opened in May, 2013.

The bridge carries traffic between the Haicang District in Xiamen to the north of the bay and Longhai, Zhangzhou to the south. It has six lanes of traffic and a speed limit of 100 kilometres per hour (62 mph). The bridge has reduced the travel time across the bay from 2 hours down to 30 minutes.

== See also ==
- List of longest cable-stayed bridge spans
- List of tallest bridges in the world
- List of longest bridges in the world
