= List of longest cable-stayed bridge spans =

The Changtai Yangtze River Bridge.

This list ranks the world's cable-stayed bridges by the length of main span, i.e. the distance between the suspension towers. The length of the main span is the most common way to rank cable-stayed bridges. If one bridge has a longer span than another, it does not mean that the bridge is the longer from shore to shore, or from anchorage to anchorage. However, the size of the main span does often correlate with the height of the towers, and the engineering complexity involved in designing and constructing the bridge.

Cable-stayed bridges with more than three spans are generally more complex, and bridges of this type generally represent a more notable engineering achievement, even where their spans are shorter.

Cable-stayed bridges have the second-longest spans, after suspension bridges, of bridge types. They are practical for spans up to around 1 kilometre (0.6 mi). The Changtai Yangtze River Bridge over the Yangtze River in China, with its 1,176 metres (3,858 ft) span, has the longest span of any cable-stayed bridge, displacing the former record holder, the Russky Bridge over the Eastern Bosphorus in Vladivostok, Russia 1,104 metres (3,622 ft) on 9 September 2025.

== Completed cable-stayed bridges ==
This list of largest cable-stayed bridges includes all bridges with a main span of at least 500 metres (1,640 ft) in length. This list only includes bridges that carry vehicular traffic, such as automobiles or trains. It does not include suspension bridges, footbridges or pipeline bridges.

Sortable list of largest completed cable-stayed bridges, ranked by length of main span
Image	Name	Main span metres (feet)	Pylons	Year completed	Location	Country	Ref
	Changtai Yangtze River Bridge	1,176 m (3,858 ft)	2	2025	Changzhou–Taizhou, Jiangsu; 32°00′31″N 119°58′06″E	China	
	Russky Bridge	1,104 m (3,622 ft)	2	2012	Vladivostok–Russky Island; 43°03′49″N 131°54′29″E	Russia	
	Husutong Yangtze River Bridge	1,092 m (3,583 ft)	2	2020	Nantong–Suzhou, Jiangsu; 32°00′16″N 120°42′48″E	China	
	Sutong Yangtze River Bridge	1,088 m (3,570 ft)	2	2008	Suzhou–Nantong, Jiangsu; 31°46′38″N 120°59′42″E	China	
	Stonecutters Bridge	1,018 m (3,340 ft)	2	2009	Tsing Yi–Stonecutters Island, Hong Kong; 22°19′34″N 114°07′06″E	China	
	Qingshan Yangtze River Bridge	938 m (3,077 ft)	2	2021	Wuhan, Hubei; 30°40′47″N 114°28′00″E	China	
	Edong Yangtze River Bridge	926 m (3,038 ft)	2	2010	Huangshi, Hubei; 30°15′38″N 115°04′20″E	China	
	Jiayu Yangtze River Bridge	920 m (3,018 ft)	2	2019	Jiayu County–Honghu, Hubei; 30°03′12″N 113°58′01″E	China	
	Tatara Bridge	890 m (2,920 ft)	2	1999	Ikuchijima, Hiroshima–Ōmishima Island, Ehime; 34°15′35″N 133°03′54″E	Japan	
	Pont de Normandie	856 m (2,808 ft)	2	1995	Le Havre, Seine-Maritime–Honfleur, Calvados; 49°25′56″N 0°16′26″E	France	
	Gordie Howe International Bridge	853 m (2,799 ft)	2	2026	Detroit, Michigan–Windsor, Ontario; 42°17′15″N 83°05′52″W	Canada; United States	
	Chizhou Yangtze River Bridge	828 m (2,717 ft)	2	2019	Chizhou–Zongyang County, Anhui; 30°41′51″N 117°20′44″E	China	
	Shishou Yangtze River Bridge	820 m (2,690 ft)	2	2019	Shishou, Hubei; 29°47′21″N 112°29′36″E	China	
	Jiujiang Yangtze River Expressway Bridge	818 m (2,684 ft)	2	2013	Jiujiang, Jiangxi–Huangmei County, Hubei; 29°43′21″N 115°54′30″E	China	
	Jingyue Yangtze River Bridge	816 m (2,677 ft)	2	2010	Jianli, Hubei–Yueyang, Hunan; 29°32′38″N 113°13′23″E	China	
	Wuxue Yangtze River Bridge	808 m (2,651 ft)	2	2021	Wuxue–Yangxin County, Hubei; 29°50′30″N 115°30′07″E	China	
	Second Wuhu Yangtze River Bridge	806 m (2,644 ft)	2	2017	Wuhu, Anhui; 31°14′06″N 118°07′45″E	China	
	Incheon Bridge	800 m (2,625 ft)	2	2009	Incheon–Yeongjongdo; 37°24′50″N 126°34′00″E	South Korea	
	Yachi River Bridge	800 m (2,625 ft)	2	2016	Qianxi County–Qingzhen, Guizhou; 26°50′57″N 106°08′15″E	China	
	Xiamen Zhangzhou Bridge	780 m (2,559 ft)	2	2013	Xiamen–Zhangzhou, Fujian; 24°27′23″N 117°56′58″E	China	
	Wuhan Zhuankou Yangtze River Bridge	760 m (2,493 ft)	2	2017	Wuhan, Hubei; 30°26′04″N 114°11′09″E	China	
	Danjiangkou Reservoir Bridge	760 m (2,493 ft)	2	2023	Danjiangkou, Hubei; 32°36′22″N 111°17′51″E	China	
	Zolotoy Bridge	737 m (2,418 ft)	2	2012	Vladivostok; 43°06′31″N 131°53′46″E	Russia	
	Shanghai Yangtze River Bridge	730 m (2,395 ft)	2	2009	Shanghai–Chongming County; 31°26′04″N 121°44′37″E	China	
	Third Wanzhou Yangtze River Bridge	730 m (2,395 ft)	2	2019	Wanzhou, Chongqing; 30°47′25″N 108°23′49″E	China	
	Duge Bridge	720 m (2,362 ft)	2	2016	Xuanwei, Yunnan–Shuicheng, Guizhou; 26°23′08″N 104°40′26″E	China	
	Chibi Yangtze River Bridge	720 m (2,362 ft)	2	2021	Chibi–Honghu, Hubei; 29°51′31″N 113°34′14″E	China	
	Huangmaohai Bridge	720 m (2,362 ft)	3	2024	Zhuhai–Taishan, Guangdong; 22°00′37″N 113°05′40″E	China	
	Minpu Bridge	708 m (2,323 ft)	2	2009	Shanghai; 31°03′10″N 121°28′37″E	China	
	Jiangshun Xi River Bridge	700 m (2,297 ft)	2	2015	Foshan–Jiangmen, Guangdong; 22°46′50″N 113°04′09″E	China	
	Gaolangang Bridge	700 m (2,297 ft)	2	2024	Zhuhai–Taishan, Guangdong; 22°01′16″N 113°07′16″E	China	
	Xiangshan Harbor Bridge	688 m (2,257 ft)	2	2012	Ningbo–Xiangshan County, Zhejiang; 29°37′25″N 121°48′33″E	China	
	Xiangshan Harbor Railway Bridge	688 m (2,257 ft)	2	2026	Ningbo–Xiangshan County, Zhejiang; 29°37′27″N 121°48′36″E	China	
	Langqi Min River Bridge	680 m (2,231 ft)	2	2013	Fuzhou, Fujian; 26°05′57″N 119°32′13″E	China	
	Second Fengdu Yangtze River Bridge	680 m (2,231 ft)	2	2017	Fengdu County, Chongqing; 29°52′05″N 107°42′28″E	China	
	Xindu Jinsha River Bridge	680 m (2,231 ft)	2	2026	Pingshan County, Sichuan–Suijiang County, Yunnan; 28°40′06″N 103°51′48″E	China	
	Bianyuzhou Yangtze River Railway Bridge	672 m (2,205 ft)	2	2021	Jiujiang, Jiangxi–Huangmei County, Hubei; 29°44′25″N 115°51′32″E	China	
	Baijusi Yangtze River Bridge	660 m (2,165 ft)	2	2022	Dadukou District–Banan District, Chongqing; 29°25′54″N 106°30′25″E	China	
	Yangmeizhou Bridge	658 m (2,159 ft)	2	2024	Xiangtan, Hunan; 27°50′17″N 112°52′59″E	China	
	Queensferry Crossing	650 m (2,133 ft)	3	2017	Edinburgh–Fife, Scotland; 56°00′17″N 3°24′45″W	United Kingdom	
	Nanjing Dashengguan Yangtze River Bridge	648 m (2,126 ft)	2	2005	Nanjing, Jiangsu; 31°58′12″N 118°38′29″E	China	
	Wangdong Yangtze River Bridge	638 m (2,093 ft)	2	2016	Wangjiang County–Dongzhi County, Anhui; 30°05′53″N 116°47′35″E	China	
	New Yalu River Bridge	636 m (2,087 ft)	2	2015	Dandong, Liaoning–Sinuiju, North Pyongan Province; 40°02′08″N 124°22′10″E	China; North Korea	
	Tongling Yangtze River Road-railway Bridge	630 m (2,067 ft)	2	2015	Tongling, Anhui; 31°05′01″N 117°58′11″E	China	
	Nanjing Baguazhou Yangtze River Bridge	628 m (2,060 ft)	2	2001	Nanjing, Jiangsu; 32°09′45″N 118°50′11″E	China	
	Shunde Bridge	626 m (2,054 ft)	2	2025	Foshan, Guangdong; 22°48′14″N 113°20′19″E	China	
	Jintang Bridge	620 m (2,034 ft)	2	2009	Ningbo–Jintang Island, Zhejiang; 30°03′40″N 121°48′16″E	China	
	Baishazhou Yangtze River Bridge	618 m (2,028 ft)	2	2000	Wuhan, Hubei; 30°29′24″N 114°14′10″E	China	
	Qianjiang Bridge	618 m (2,028 ft)	2	2024	Laibin–Wuxuan, Guangxi; 23°42′10″N 109°32′29″E	China	
	Erqi Yangtze River Bridge	616 m (2,021 ft)	3	2011	Wuhan, Hubei; 30°37′39″N 114°20′31″E	China	
	Yongchuan Yangtze River Bridge	608 m (1,995 ft)	2	2014	Yongchuan–Jiangjin, Chongqing; 29°02′38″N 105°53′02″E	China	
	Qingzhou Bridge	605 m (1,985 ft)	2	2001	Fuzhou, Fujian; 25°59′15″N 119°28′18″E	China	
	Yangpu Bridge	602 m (1,975 ft)	2	1993	Shanghai; 31°15′27″N 121°32′29″E	China	
	Nanjing Jiangxinzhou Yangtze River Bridge	600 m (1,969 ft)	3	2020	Nanjing, Jiangsu; 32°00′30″N 118°39′53″E	China	
	Xijiang Rail Bridge	600 m (1,969 ft)	2	2021	Jiangmen, Guangdong; 22°42′01″N 113°05′48″E	China	
	Xupu Bridge	590 m (1,936 ft)	2	1997	Shanghai; 31°07′47″N 121°27′52″E	China	
	Meiko-Chuo Bridge	590 m (1,936 ft)	2	1998	Nagoya, Aichi; 35°03′12″N 136°51′36″E	Japan	
	Yijishan Yangtze River Bridge	588 m (1,929 ft)	2	2020	Wuhu, Anhui; 31°21′20″N 118°20′30″E	China	
	Taoyaomen Bridge	580 m (1,903 ft)	2	2003	Zhoushan, Zhejiang; 30°06′N 121°58′E	China	
	Anqing Yangtze River Railway Bridge	580 m (1,903 ft)	2	2014	Anqing, Anhui; 30°34′20″N 117°14′55″E	China	
	Liuguanghe Xiqian Expressway Bridge	580 m (1,903 ft)	2	2017	Xiuwen–Qianxi, Guizhou; 27°04′41″N 106°24′06″E	China	
	Honglian Bridge	580 m (1,903 ft)	2	2023	Nansha, Guangdong; 22°41′46″N 113°35′31″E	China	
	Shenzhong Corridor Zhongshan Bridge	580 m (1,903 ft)	2	2024	Zhongshan, Guangdong; 22°33′20″N 113°37′51″E	China	
	Fulong Xi River Bridge	580 m (1,903 ft)	2	2024	Foshan, Guangdong; 22°59′54″N 112°50′33″E	China	
	Gujin Chishui River Bridge	575 m (1,886 ft)	2	2024	Gulin County, Sichuan–Jinsha County, Guizhou; 27°45′11″N 105°58′56″E	China	
	Nanxi Xianyuan Yangtze River Bridge	572 m (1,877 ft)	2	2019	Nanxi District, Sichuan; 28°48′39″N 104°57′38″E	China	
	Huanggang Yangtze River Bridge	567 m (1,860 ft)	2	2014	Huanggang, Hubei; 30°32′07″N 114°50′01″E	China	
	Yumenkou Yellow River Road Bridge	565 m (1,854 ft)	2	2020	Hancheng, Shaanxi–Hejin, Shanxi; 35°39′18″N 110°36′05″E	China	
	Rio–Antirrio Bridge	560 m (1,837 ft)	4	2004	Rio, Peloponnese–Antirrio, Aetolia-Acarnania; 38°19′17″N 21°46′22″E	Greece	
	Haihuang Bridge	560 m (1,837 ft)	2	2017	Jainca County–Hualong Hui, Qinghai; 35°50′14″N 102°05′02″E	China	
	Zunyu Expressway Xiang River Bridge	560 m (1,837 ft)	2	2021	Bozhou–Weng'an County, Guizhou; 27°26′52″N 107°15′52″E	China	
	Cheongna Haneul Bridge	560 m (1,837 ft)	2	2026	Incheon–Yeongjongdo; 37°30′56″N 126°35′12″E	South Korea	
	Pingtang Bridge	550 m (1,804 ft)	3	2019	Pingtang, Guizhou; 25°47′07″N 107°03′24″E	China	
	Cần Thơ Bridge	550 m (1,804 ft)	2	2010	Cần Thơ, Mekong Delta; 10°02′06″N 105°48′45″E	Vietnam	
	Changmen Bridge	550 m (1,804 ft)	2	2019	Fuzhou, Fujian; 26°08′04″N 119°35′32″E	China	
	Zhoudai Bridge	550 m (1,804 ft)	3	2021	Zhoushan, Zhejiang; 30°13′36″N 122°00′41″E	China	
	Busan Harbor Bridge	540 m (1,772 ft)	2	2014	Busan, Yeongnam; 35°06′20″N 129°03′54″E	South Korea	
	La Constitución de 1812 Bridge	540 m (1,772 ft)	2	2015	Cádiz, Andalusia; 36°31′27″N 6°15′35″W	Spain	
	Godeok–Topyeong Bridge	540 m (1,772 ft)	2	2025	Gangdong District, Seoul–Guri, Gyeonggi Province; 37°34′18″N 127°08′57″E	South Korea	
	Danjiang Xiaosanxia Bridge	536 m (1,759 ft)	2	2025	Xichuan County, Henan; 32°52′4″N 111°31′57″E	China	
	Shachengwan Bridge	535 m (1,755 ft)	2	2021	Fuding, Fujian; 27°14′23″N 120°17′33″E	China	
	Pingtan Strait Rail-Road Bridge	532 m (1,745 ft)	2	2020	Changle–Pingtan County, Fujian; 25°41′45″N 119°37′40″E	China	
	Skarnsund Bridge	530 m (1,739 ft)	2	1991	Inderøy, Trøndelag; 63°50′37″N 11°04′35″E	Norway	
	Atlantic Bridge, Panama	530 m (1,739 ft)	2	2019	Colón, Colón Province; 9°18′29″N 79°55′08″W	Panama	
	Yinzhouhu Bridge	530 m (1,739 ft)	2	2023	Jiangmen, Guangdong; 22°25′4″N 113°4′11″E	China	
	Rongshan Yangtze River Bridge	530 m (1,739 ft)	2	2024	Hejiang County, Sichuan; 28°50′31″N 105°54′01″E	China	
	Qiji Yellow River Bridge	530 m (1,739 ft)	2	2025	Jinan–Qihe County, Shandong; 36°43′46″N 116°51′19″E	China	
	Longli Bridge	528 m (1,732 ft)	2	2024	Longli County, Guizhou; 26°23′09″N 106°50′59″E	China	
	Lingang Yangtze River Bridge	522 m (1,713 ft)	2	2023	Yibin, Sichuan; 28°46′44″N 104°43′34″E	China	
	Baluarte Bridge	520 m (1,706 ft)	2	2012	Concordia, Sinaloa–Pueblo Nuevo, Durango; 23°32′03″N 105°45′35″W	Mexico	
	Huangyi Yangtze River Bridge	520 m (1,706 ft)	2	2012	Luzhou, Sichuan; 28°53′42″N 105°32′54″E	China	
	Hejiang Shenbicheng Yangtze River Bridge	520 m (1,706 ft)	2	2023	Hejiang County, Sichuan; 28°52′19″N 105°41′50″E	China	
	Naxi Yangtze River Bridge	520 m (1,706 ft)	2	2023	Luzhou, Sichuan; 28°47′32″N 105°22′9″E	China	
	Xiangbei Marshalling Station Bridge	520 m (1,706 ft)	2	2023	Xiangyang, Hubei; 32°7′3″N 112°9′43″E	China	
	Hongqimen Bridge	520 m (1,706 ft)	2	2024	Nansha, Guangdong; 22°37′12″N 113°34′59″E	China	
	Anluo Expressway Yellow River Bridge	520 m (1,706 ft)	2	2025	Yuanyang County–Zhongmu County, Henan; 34°56′56″N 114°09′30″E	China	
	Queshi Bridge	518 m (1,699 ft)	2	1999	Shantou, Guangdong; 23°20′37″N 116°39′36″E	China	
	Gong'an Yangtze River Bridge	518 m (1,699 ft)	2	2018	Gong'an County–Jiangling County, Hubei; 30°04′14″N 112°19′39″E	China	
	Tsurumi Tsubasa Bridge	510 m (1,673 ft)	2	1994	Yokohama, Kanagawa; 35°28′20″N 139°41′57″E	Japan	
	Anqing Yangtze River Bridge	510 m (1,673 ft)	2	2004	Anqing, Anhui; 30°29′57″N 117°04′17″E	China	
	First Cheonsa Bridge	510 m (1,673 ft)	2	2019	Amtae Island–Aphae Island, South Jeolla Province; 34°51′38″N 126°10′17″E	South Korea	
	Hongshui River Huiluo Bridge	508 m (1,667 ft)	2	2018	Luodian County, Guizhou–Tian'e County, Guangxi; 25°10′58″N 106°41′12″E	China	
	Harbor Bridge Project	506 m (1,660 ft)	2	2025	Corpus Christi, Texas; 27°48′48″N 97°23′59″W	United States	
	Tianxingzhou Yangtze River Bridge	504 m (1,654 ft)	2	2008	Wuhan, Hubei; 30°39′25″N 114°24′01″E	China	
	Jingzhou Yangtze River Bridge (North bridge)	500 m (1,640 ft)	2	2002	Jingzhou, Hubei; 30°19′04″N 112°13′02″E	China	
	Kanchanaphisek Bridge	500 m (1,640 ft)	2	2007	Phra Pradaeng District, Samut Prakan Province; 13°38′00″N 100°32′18″E	Thailand	
	Sungai Johor Bridge	500 m (1,640 ft)	2	2011	Johor Bahru, Johor; 1°31′56″N 104°01′19″E	Malaysia	
	Mokpo Bridge	500 m (1,640 ft)	2	2012	Mokpo, South Jeolla Province; 34°47′21″N 126°21′20″E	South Korea	
	Hwatae Bridge	500 m (1,640 ft)	2	2015	Yeosu, South Jeolla Province; 34°35′54″N 127°44′07″E	South Korea	
	Honghe Bridge	500 m (1,640 ft)	4	2020	Zhuhai, Guangdong; 22°10′09″N 113°26′04″E	China	(Note: The navigable part of the Honghe Bridge consists of a series of two cable-stayed bridges with each a distribution of 73+162+500+162+73 meters one after the other, there is a discontinuity between the two cable-stayed sections.)
	Nanjing Shangba Jiajiang Bridge	500 m (1,640 ft)	2	2020	Nanjing, Jiangsu; 32°10′08″N 118°46′23″E	China	
	Hwayang-Jobal Bridge	500 m (1,640 ft)	2	2020	Jobaldo Island–Jangsu-ri, South Jeolla Province; 34°38′5″N 127°34′19″E	South Korea	
	Xuefenghu Bridge	500 m (1,640 ft)	2	2023	Anhua County, Hunan; 28°17′43″N 111°5′23″E	China	
	Sudarshan Setu	500 m (1,640 ft)	2	2024	Okha–Bet Dwarka, Gujarat; 22°27′07″N 69°05′05″E	India	

== Cable-stayed bridges under construction ==
Sortable list of cable-stayed bridges under construction, ranked by length of main span
Image	Name	Main span metres (feet)	Pylons	Year to open	Location	Country	Ref
	Guanyinsi Yangtze River Bridge	1,160 m (3,806 ft)	2	2026	Gong'an County–Jiangling County, Hubei; 30°06′17″N 112°12′13″E	China	
	Ma'anshan Yangtze River Rail-Road Bridge	1,120 m (3,675 ft)	3	2026	Ma'anshan, Anhui; 31°35′36″N 118°23′26″E	China	
	Anqing Haikou Yangtze River Bridge	1,100 m (3,609 ft)	2	2030	Anqing, Anhui; 30°27′43″N 116°58′10″E	China	
	Second Badong Yangtze River Bridge	1,090 m (3,576 ft)	2	2030	Badong County, Hubei; 31°3′2″N 110°22′49″E	China	
	Puzhehei Bridge	930 m (3,051 ft)	2	2028	Luxi County–Qiubei County, Yunnan; 24°16′52″N 103°48′54″E	China	
	Wushan Shennv Yangtze River Bridge	898 m (2,946 ft)	2	2028	Wushan County, Chongqing; 31°3′29″N 109°51′25″E	China	
	Bailizhou Yangtze River Bridge	890 m (2,920 ft)	2	2026	Zhijiang, Hubei; 30°25′1″N 111°46′36″E	China	
	Zhongshan Xiangshan Bridge	880 m (2,887 ft)	2	2026	Zhongshan, Guangdong; 22°34′43″N 113°32′25″E	China	
	Lena Bridge	840 m (2,756 ft)	3	2028	Yakutsk, Sakha Republic; 61°48′04″N 129°41′20″E	Russia	
	Chizhou Yangtze River Rail-Road Bridge	812 m (2,664 ft)	2	2027	Chizhou, Anhui; 30°45′28″N 117°34′31″E	China	
	Shenzhen-Jiangmen Rail-Road Hongqili Bridge	808 m (2,651 ft)	2	2028	Zhongshan, Guangdong; 22°40′36″N 113°31′27″E	China	
	Xiazhou Yangtze River Rail-Road Bridge	800 m (2,625 ft)	2		Yichang, Hubei; 30°39′20″N 111°19′34″E	China	
	Qinglongmen First Bridge	756 m (2,480 ft)	3	2027	Ningbo–Zhoushan, Zhejiang; 29°44′9″N 121°59′18″E	China	
	Fuling Yangtze River Rail-Road Bridge	736 m (2,415 ft)	2		Fuling District, Chongqing; 29°48′54″N 107°28′29″E	China	
	Min'an Bridge	716 m (2,349 ft)	2	2027	Fuzhou, Fujian; 26°3′15″N 119°30′31″E	China	
	Kapurthala Bridge	700 m (2,297 ft)	2	2028	Goindwal, Punjab; 31°20′25″N 75°8′18″E	India	
	Taoyaomen Rail-Road Bridge	666 m (2,185 ft)	2	2026	Zhoushan, Zhejiang; 30°6′3″N 121°57′36″E	China	
	Daxi River Bridge	650 m (2,133 ft)	2	2026	Fengjie County, Chongqing; 30°59′9″N 109°36′6″E	China	
	Pingnan Xun River Bridge	636 m (2,087 ft)	2	2025	Pingnan County, Guangxi; 23°28′37″N 110°29′46″E	China	
	Second Baishazhou Yangtze River Bridge	618 m (2,028 ft)	2		Wuhan, Hubei; 30°29′14″N 114°14′29″E	China	
	Fuling Shituo Yangtze River Rail-Road Bridge	608 m (1,995 ft)	2	2026	Fuling District, Chongqing; 29°43′16″N 107°7′58″E	China	
	Dongying Yellow River Rail-Road Bridge	600 m (1,969 ft)	2		Dongying, Shandong; 37°25′36″N 118°14′8″E	China	
	Msikaba Bridge	580 m (1,903 ft)	2	2027	Lusikisiki, Eastern Cape; 31°17′32″S 29°47′50″E	South Africa	
	Hengqin Expressway Yu River Bridge	580 m (1,903 ft)	2		Hengzhou, Guangxi; 22°44′2″N 109°23′39″E	China	
	G9221 Hangyong Yongjiang Bridge	570 m (1,870 ft)	3	2026	Ningbo, Zhejiang; 29°58′26″N 121°44′13″E	China	
	Songzihe Bridge	555 m (1,821 ft)	2		Songzi, Hubei; 30°22′15″N 111°44′54″E	China	
	Huangjueping Yangtze River Bridge	550 m (1,804 ft)	2		Jiulongpo District–Nan'an District, Chongqing; 29°29′31″N 106°32′52″E	China	
	Francis Scott Key Bridge replacement	507 m (1,663 ft)	2	2030	Baltimore, Maryland; 39°13′01″N 76°31′42″W	United States	
	Qingzhou Liujiang Bridge	506 m (1,660 ft)	2	2026	Liuzhou, Guangxi; 24°15′15″N 109°38′1″E	China	

== Longest cable-stayed bridge decks ==
The definition of cable-stayed bridge deck length used here is: A continuous part of the bridge deck that is supported only by stay-cables and pylons, or are free spans. This means that columns supporting the side span as for example found in Pont de Normandie, excludes most of the side span decks from the cable-stayed deck length.

There are some bridges with long bridge decks whose span lengths have not been published, and therefore are missing. Extradosed bridges are not included. The thirty longest decks are:

Name	Cable-stayed deck length	Pylons	Diagram
Ma'anshan Yangtze River Rail-Road Bridge	3,024 m (9,921.3 ft)	3	392+1120+1120+392
Jiaxing-Shaoxing Sea Bridge	2,540 m (8,333.3 ft)	6	200+428+428+428+428+428+200
Millau Viaduct	2,460 m (8,070.9 ft)	7	204+342+342+342+342+342+342+204
Lena Bridge under construction	2,280 m (7,480.3 ft)	3	300+840+840+300
Rio-Antirio Bridge	2,252 m (7,388.5 ft)	4	286+560+560+560+286
Changtai Yangtze River Bridge	2,156 m (7,073.5 ft)	2	490+1176+490
Husutong Yangtze River Bridge	2,016 m (6,614.2 ft)	2	462+1092+462
Huangmaohai Bridge	2,000 m (6,561.7 ft)	3	280+720+720+280
Pelješac Bridge	1,804 m (5,918.6 ft)	6	189+285+285+285+285+285+189
Queensferry Crossing	1,744 m (5,721.8 ft)	3	222+650+650+222
Sutong Yangtze River Bridge	1,688 m (5,538.1 ft)	2	300+1088+300
Nanjing Jiangxinzhou Yangtze River Bridge	1,636 m (5,367.5 ft)	3	218+600+600+218
Erqi Yangtze River Bridge	1,552 m (5,091.9 ft)	3	160+616+616+160
Nhật Tân Bridge	1,500 m (4,921.3 ft)	5	150+300+300+300+300+150
General Rafael Urdaneta Bridge	1,495 m (4,904.9 ft)	6	160+235+235+235+235+235+160
Zhoudai Bridge	1,474 m (4,836.0 ft)	3	160+616+616+160
Chishi Bridge	1,470 m (4,822.8 ft)	4	165+380+380+380+165
Pingtang Bridge	1,460 m (4,790.0 ft)	3	180+550+550+180

== Timeline of world record lengths ==
Many early suspension bridges included cable-stayed construction, including the 1817 footbridge Dryburgh Abbey Bridge, James Dredge's patented Victoria Bridge, Bath (1836), and the later Albert Bridge, London (1872), and Brooklyn Bridge (1883). Their designers found that the combination of technologies created a stiffer bridge. Albert Caquot's 1952 concrete-decked cable-stayed bridge over the Donzère-Mondragon canal at Pierrelatte is one of the first of the modern type, but had little influence on later development. The steel-decked Strömsund Bridge designed by Franz Dischinger (1956) is therefore more often cited as the first modern cable-stayed bridge.

This list tracks the bridge having the longest cable-stayed main span through time.

This list may be incomplete and detailed sources for pre-modern cable-stayed bridges may not be available, so the timeline might not be accurate.

Timeline of bridges with some form of cable-stay construction
Record	Name	Location	Main span: metres (feet)	Crosses	Notes
1871 – 1885	Old Redheugh Bridge	(United Kingdom) Newcastle upon Tyne	73 m (240 ft)	River Tyne	destroyed in 1885
1885 – 1891	Järnbron	(Sweden) Uppsala	35 m (115 ft)	Fyris River	
1891 – 1914	Bluff Dale Bridge	(United States) Bluff Dale, TX	43 m (141 ft)	Paluxy River	
1914 – 1922	Kaihihi Stream Bridge	(New Zealand) Okato	52 m (171 ft)		footbridge
1922 – 1926	Tauranga Bridge	(New Zealand) Ōpōtiki	58 m (190 ft)	Waioeka River	
1926 – 1952	Tempul Aqueduct	(Spain) Jerez de la Frontera	60 m (200 ft)	Guadalete River	
1952 – 1956	Donzère-Mondragon Bridge	(France) Pierrelatte	81 m (266 ft)	Donzère-Mondragon Canal	
1956 – 1957	Strömsund Bridge	(Sweden) Strömsund	182 m (597 ft)	Ströms vattudal	
1957 – 1959	Theodor Heuss Bridge	(Germany) Düsseldorf	260 m (850 ft)	Rhine	
1959 – 1969	Severin Bridge	(Germany) Cologne	302 m (991 ft)	Rhine	
1969 – 1971	Kniebrücke	(Germany) Düsseldorf	319 m (1,047 ft)	Rhine	
1971 – 1974	Duisburg-Neuenkamp Bridge	(Germany) Duisburg	350 m (1,150 ft)	Rhine	
1974 – 1983	Saint-Nazaire Bridge	(France) Saint-Nazaire	404 m (1,325 ft)	Loire River	
1983 – 1986	Ingeniero Carlos Fernández Casado Bridge	(Spain) León	440 m (1,440 ft)	Barrios de Luna Reservoir	
1986 – 1991	Alex Fraser Bridge	(Canada) Vancouver	465 m (1,526 ft)	Fraser River	
1991 – 1993	Skarnsund Bridge	(Norway) Inderøy	530 m (1,740 ft)	Skarnsundet	
1993 – 1995	Yangpu Bridge	(China) Shanghai	602 m (1,975 ft)	Huangpu River	
1995 – 1999	Pont de Normandie	(France) Le Havre	856 m (2,808 ft)	Seine River	
1999 – 2008	Tatara Bridge	(Japan) Imabari	890 m (2,920 ft)	Inland Sea	
2008 – 2012	Sutong Bridge	(China) Suzhou–Nantong	1,088 m (3,570 ft)	Yangtze River	
2012 – 2025	Russky Bridge	(Russia) Vladivostok	1,104 m (3,622 ft)	Eastern Bosphorus	
2025 –	Changtai Yangtze River Bridge	(China) Changzhou–Taizhou	1,176 m (3,858 ft)	Yangtze River	

== See also ==
- List of longest suspension bridge spans
- List of longest masonry arch bridge spans
- List of longest arch bridge spans
- List of longest beam bridge spans
- List of longest bridges
- List of highest bridges
- List of tallest bridges
- List of cable-stayed bridges in the United States
- List of spans — list of remarkable permanent wire spans
- Floating cable-stayed bridge
- Cable-stayed suspension bridge

== Notes and references ==
- Nicolas Janberg, Structurae.com, International Database for Civil and Structural Engineering
- Others references
- Notes
