= Danjiangkou Reservoir Bridge =

Cable-stayed bridge, China

Danjiangkou Reservoir Bridge 丹江口水库大桥
- Coordinates: 32°36′22″N 111°17′51″E
- Carries: Hubei S77 Shixi Expressway
- Crosses: Han River (Hubei and Shaanxi); Danjiangkou Reservoir
- Locale: Danjiangkou, Hubei, China

Characteristics
- Design: Cable-stayed
- Material: Steel, concrete
- Total length: 1,076 m (3,530 ft)
- Width: 31.6 m (104 ft)
- Height: 194.1 m (637 ft); 199.4 m (654 ft)
- Longest span: 760 m (2,493 ft)
- No. of lanes: 4

History
- Construction start: 26 August 2019
- Inaugurated: 6 January 2023

Location
- Interactive map of Danjiangkou Reservoir Bridge

The Danjiangkou Reservoir Bridge (Chinese: 丹江口水库大桥) is a cable-stayed bridge over the Danjiangkou Reservoir (Han River (Hubei and Shaanxi)) in Danjiangkou, Hubei province.

== See also ==
- List of bridges in China
- List of longest cable-stayed bridge spans
