= Second Badong Yangtze River Bridge =

Second Badong Yangtze River Bridge 巴东长江二桥
- Coordinates: 31°3′2″N 110°22′49″E
- Carries: Badong–Zhangjiajie Expressway
- Crosses: Yangtze River
- Locale: Badong County, Hubei, China
- Preceded by: Badong Yangtze River Bridge
- Followed by: Zigui Yangtze River Bridge

Characteristics
- Design: Cable-stayed bridge
- Material: Steel, concrete
- Width: 42.3 m (139 ft)
- Height: north tower 374 metres (1,227 ft) south tower 341 metres (1,119 ft)
- Longest span: 1,090 m (3,580 ft)

Location
- Interactive map of Second Badong Yangtze River Bridge

The Second Badong Yangtze River Bridge (Chinese: 巴东长江二桥) is an under-construction bridge spanning the Yangtze River in Badong County, Hubei, China. With a main span of 1,090 m (3,580 ft) it is one of the longest cable-stayed bridges in the world

== See also ==
- Bridges and tunnels across the Yangtze River
- List of bridges in China
- List of longest cable-stayed bridge spans
- List of tallest bridges
