= Langqi Min River Bridge =

Langqi Min River Bridge 琅岐闽江大桥
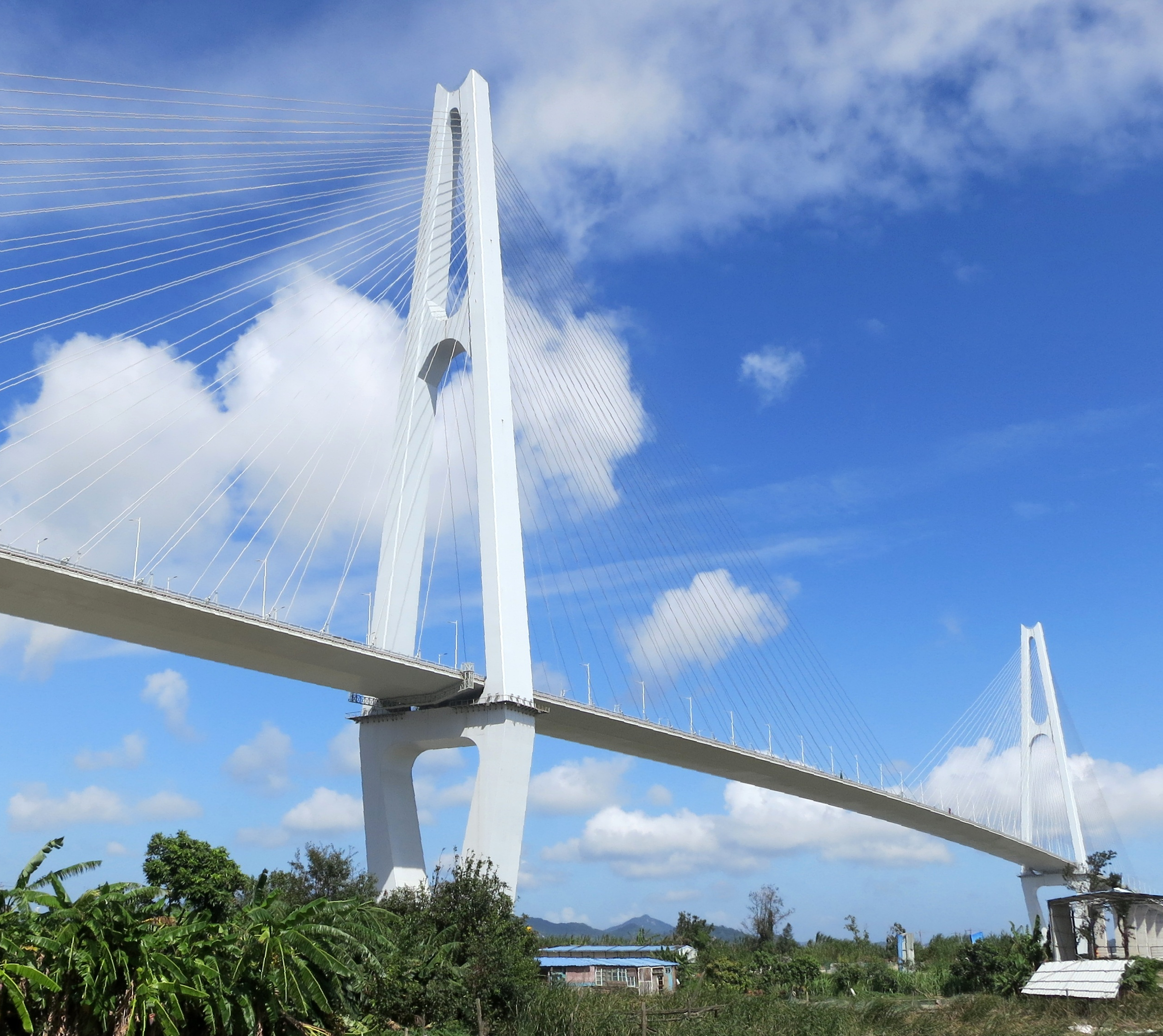
- Coordinates: 26°05′57″N 119°32′13″E
- Carries: S201 Provincial Highway
- Crosses: Min River (Fujian)
- Locale: Mawei, Fuzhou, Fujian, China
- Preceded by: Min'an Bridge (u/c)
- Followed by: Changmen Bridge

Characteristics
- Design: Cable-stayed bridge
- Material: Steel, concrete
- Total length: 2.675 km (1.662 mi)
- Width: 30.12 m (98.8 ft)
- Height: 223 m (732 ft)
- Longest span: 680 m (2,230 ft)

History
- Construction start: 24 September 2010
- Opened: 1 January 2014

Location
- Interactive map of Langqi Min River Bridge

The Langqi Min River Bridge (Chinese: 琅岐闽江大桥) is a bridge over the Min River (Fujian) in Fuzhou, China. The bridge is one of the longest cable-stayed bridge in the world when it opened in 2014.

== See also ==
- List of bridges in China
- List of longest cable-stayed bridge spans
- List of tallest bridges
