= Huangmaohai Sea-crossing Channel =

Cable-stayed bridge, China

Huangmaohai Sea-crossing Channel 黃茅海跨海通道
- Coordinates: 22°00′20″N 113°04′43″E
- Carries: Guangdong S36 Zhutai Expressway
- Crosses: Huangmao River
- Locale: Taishan–Zhuhai, Guangdong, China

Characteristics
- Material: Steel, concrete
- Total length: 31.22 km (19 mi)
- No. of lanes: 6

History
- Inaugurated: 11 December 2024

Location
- Interactive map of Huangmaohai Sea-crossing Channel

Huangmaohai Bridge 黄茅海大桥
- Coordinates: 22°00′37″N 113°05′40″E

Characteristics
- Design: Cable-stayed
- Width: 50.5 m (166 ft)
- Height: 262.83 m (862.3 ft) (central tower); 254.37 m (834.5 ft) (side towers)
- Longest span: 720 m (2,362 ft) x2

Gaolangang Bridge 高栏港大桥
- Coordinates: 22°01′16″N 113°07′16″E

Characteristics
- Design: Cable-stayed
- Width: 50.4 m (165 ft)
- Height: 254.7 m (836 ft)
- Longest span: 700 m (2,297 ft)

The Huangmaohai Sea-crossing Channel (Chinese: 黃茅海跨海通道) is a bridge complex over the Huangmao River river between Taishan and Zhuhai, Guangdong province.

== Huangmaohai Bridge ==
The Huangmaohai Bridge is a cable-stayed bridge with three towers and a span arrangement of 100+280+720+720+280+100 meters, when it opened, it is one of the longest double cable-stayed bridge with two 720 metres (2,360 ft) main spans.

== Gaolangang Bridge ==
The Gaolangang Bridge is a cable-stayed bridge with a span arrangement of 110+248+700+248+110 meters.

== See also ==
- Hong Kong–Zhuhai–Macau Bridge
- List of bridges in China
- List of longest cable-stayed bridge spans
- List of tallest bridges in the world
- Transport in China
