= Shishou Yangtze River Bridge =

Cable-stayed bridge, China

Shishou Yangtze River Bridge 石首长江大桥
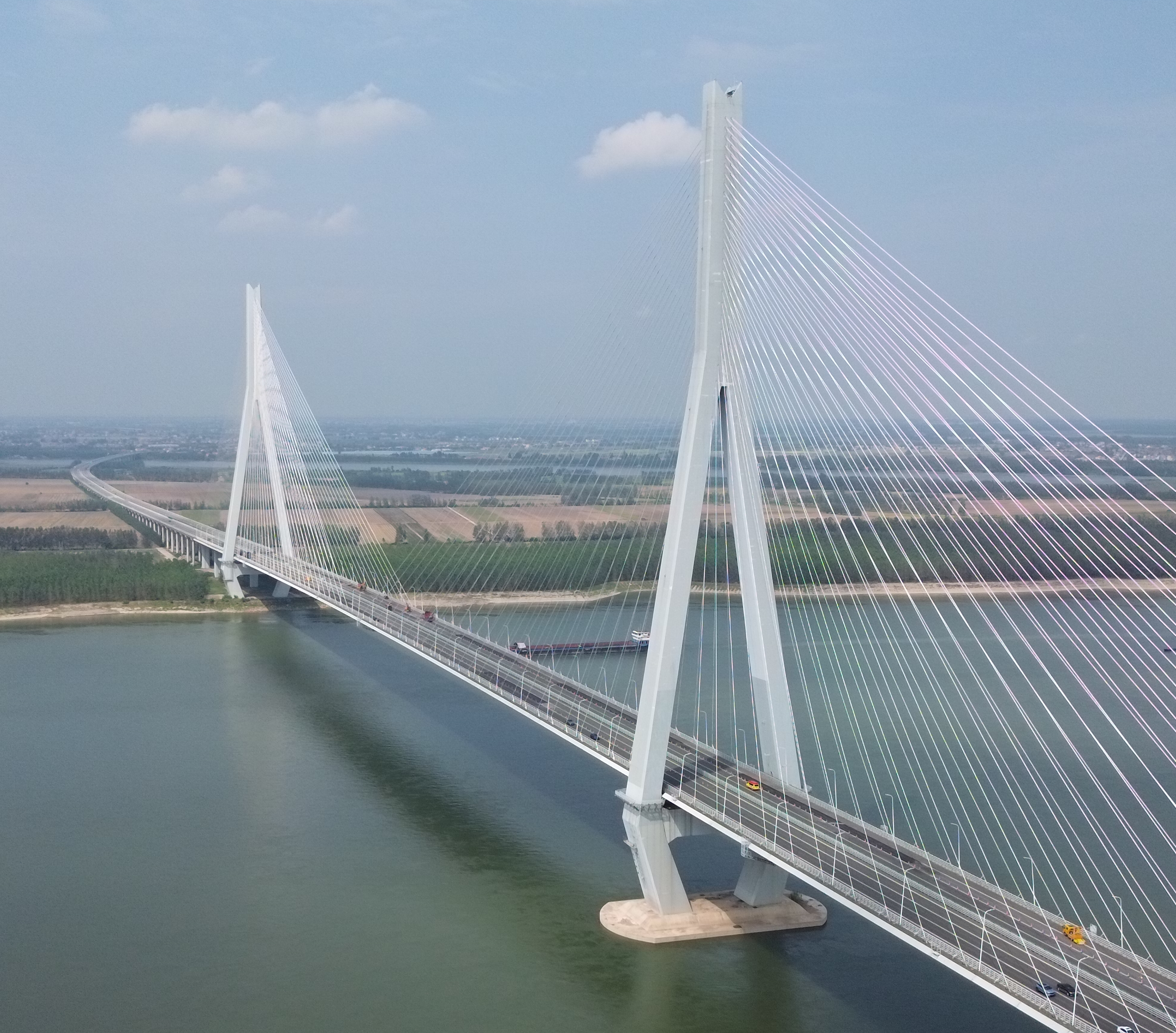
- Coordinates: 29°47′21″N 112°29′36″E
- Carries: G234; Hubei S53
- Crosses: Yangtze River
- Locale: Shishou, Hubei, China

Characteristics
- Design: Cable-stayed
- Material: Steel, concrete
- Width: 38.5 m (126 ft)
- Height: 234 m (768 ft) (north tower); 232 m (761 ft) (south tower)
- Longest span: 820 m (2,690 ft)

History
- Inaugurated: 28 September 2019

Location
- Interactive map of Shishou Yangtze River Bridge

The Shishou Yangtze River Bridge (Chinese: 石首长江大桥) is a cable-stayed bridge over the Yangtze river in Shishou, Hubei province.

When it opened, it is one of the longest cable-stayed bridges with a 820-metre (2,690 ft) main span.

== See also ==
- Bridges and tunnels across the Yangtze River
- List of bridges in China
- List of longest cable-stayed bridge spans
- List of tallest bridges in the world
