= Lujiang–Tongling railway =

Railway line in China

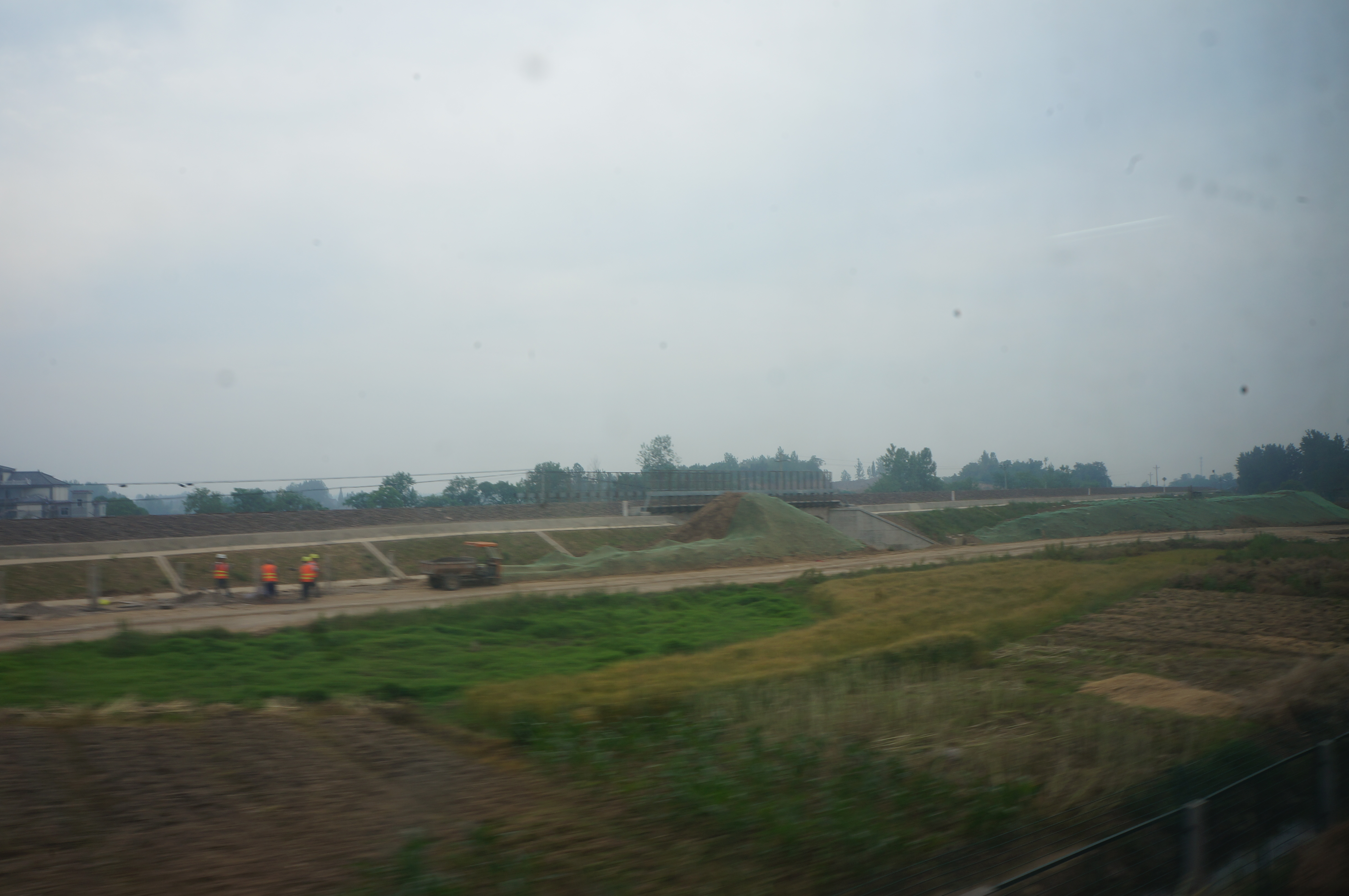
- Lujiang–Tongling railway

Overview
- Status: Operational

Service
- Type: Heavy rail

History
- Opened: 29 December 2018 (freight); 18 March 2019 (passengers)

Technical
- Line length: 112 km (70 mi)
- Track gauge: 1,435 mm (4 ft 8 1/2 in) standard gauge
- Operating speed: 120 km/h (75 mph)

The Lujiang–Tongling railway is a single-track railway in China. The combined passenger and freight line is 112 kilometres (70 mi) long and has a design speed of 120 kilometres per hour (75 mph). Passive provision was provided for electrification and a speed increase to 160 kilometres per hour (99 mph). It was built to transport freight, particularly coal and minerals.

== History ==
Construction began on 23 July 2014. The railway opened to freight on 29 December 2018. Passenger services began on 18 March 2019.

== Route ==
The line branches off from the Hefei–Jiujiang railway south of Lujiang and heads east. There are two intermediate passenger stations: Longqiao and Wuwei South. The line subsequently heads south and crosses the Yangtze via the Tongling Yangtze River Road-railway Bridge, which it shares with the Hefei–Fuzhou high-speed railway. The line ends at Zhongming, where it meets the Nanjing–Tongling railway.
