= Lingang Yangtze River Bridge =

Lingang Yangtze River Bridge 临港长江大桥
- Coordinates: 28°46′44″N 104°43′34″E
- Carries: Chongqing–Kunming high-speed railway Chengdu–Yibin high-speed railway Highway
- Crosses: Yangtze River
- Locale: Yibin, Sichuan, China
- Preceded by: Yanpingba Yangtze River Bridge
- Followed by: Nanxi Bridge

Characteristics
- Design: Cable-stayed bridge
- Material: Steel, concrete
- Total length: 1.729 km (1.074 mi)
- Width: 63.9 m (210 ft)
- Height: 253.8 m (833 ft)
- Longest span: 522 m (1,713 ft)
- No. of lanes: 6 highway lanes 4 railway tracks

History
- Construction start: 21 December 2018
- Opened: 26 December 2023

Location
- Interactive map of Lingang Yangtze River Bridge

The Lingang Yangtze River Bridge (Chinese: 临港长江大桥), also called Yibin Lingang Yangtze River Highway-Railway Bridge (Chinese: 宜宾临港长江公铁大桥), is a bridge over the Yangtze River in Yibin, Sichuan, China. It was opened to traffic on 26 December 2023.

== See also ==
- Bridges and tunnels across the Yangtze River
- List of bridges in China
- List of longest cable-stayed bridge spans
- List of tallest bridges
