= Libu Yangtze River Rail/Road Bridge =

Libu Yangtze River Rail/Road Bridge 李埠长江公铁大桥
- Coordinates: 30.2872°N 112.0758°E
- Carries: Upper level: 6 lanes highway Lower level: High-speed rail
- Crosses: Yangtze river
- Locale: Jingzhou, Hubei, China

Characteristics
- Design: double deck cable-stayed suspension bridge
- Material: Steel, concrete
- Height: 215.2 m (706 ft)
- Longest span: 1,120 m (3,670 ft)

History
- Construction end: 2028
- Construction cost: CN¥ 10.47 billion

Location
- Interactive map of Libu Yangtze River Rail/Road Bridge

The Libu Yangtze River Rail/Road Bridge (Chinese: 李埠长江公铁大桥) is a suspension bridge under construction over the Yangtze river in Jingzhou, Hubei, China, few kilometers upstream of the Jingzhou Yangtze River Bridge. The bridge is one of the longest suspension bridges with a main span of 1,120 m (3,670 ft).

== See also ==
- Bridges and tunnels across the Yangtze River
- List of bridges in China
- List of longest suspension bridge spans
