= Xiangshan Harbor Bridge =

Xiangshan Harbor Bridge 象山港大桥
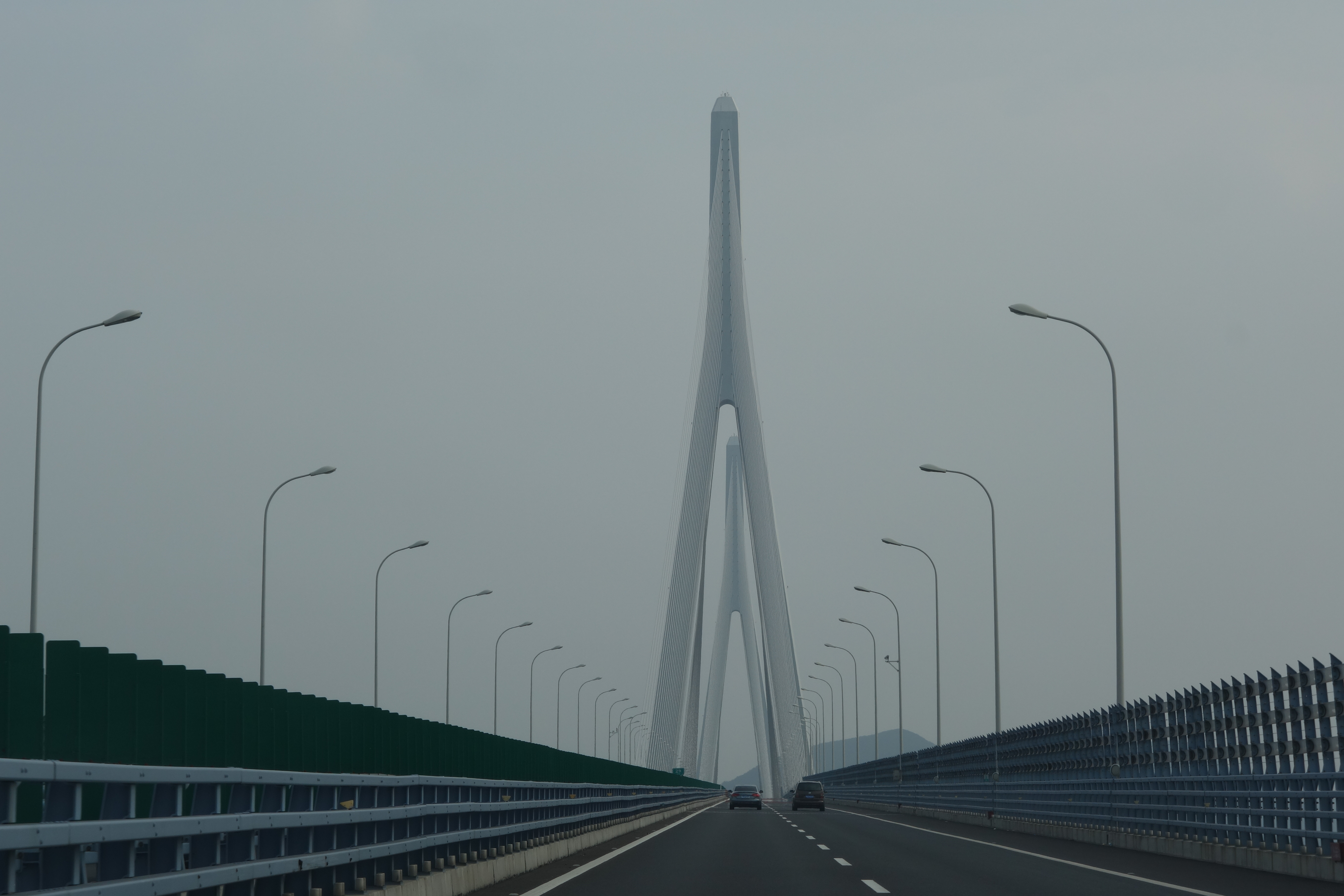
- Coordinates: 29°37′25″N 121°48′33″E
- Carries: G1523 Ningbo–Dongguan Expressway
- Crosses: Xiangshan Harbor
- Locale: Ningbo, Zhejiang

Characteristics
- Design: Cable-stayed
- Total length: 6,750 metres (22,150 ft)
- Width: 25.5 metres (84 ft)
- Height: 225.5 metres (740 ft)
- Longest span: 688 metres (2,257 ft)
- Clearance below: 53 metres (174 ft)

History
- Construction start: December 30, 2008
- Opened: December 29, 2012

Statistics
- Toll: RMB 25

Location
- Interactive map of Xiangshan Harbor Bridge

The Xiangshan Harbor Bridge is a large cable-stayed bridge in Ningbo. The bridge carries 6 lanes of traffic between Xiangshan County and Yinzhou District of Ningbo, Zhejiang. The bridge, which was opened in 2012, is one of the largest cable-stayed bridges and one of the tallest in bridges in the world.

The twin bridge for rail traffic is under construction next to the bridge, it has the same main span and height.

== See also ==
- List of bridges in China
- List of longest cable-stayed bridge spans
- List of tallest bridges
