= Baijusi Yangtze River Bridge =

Baijusi Yangtze River Bridge 白居寺长江大桥
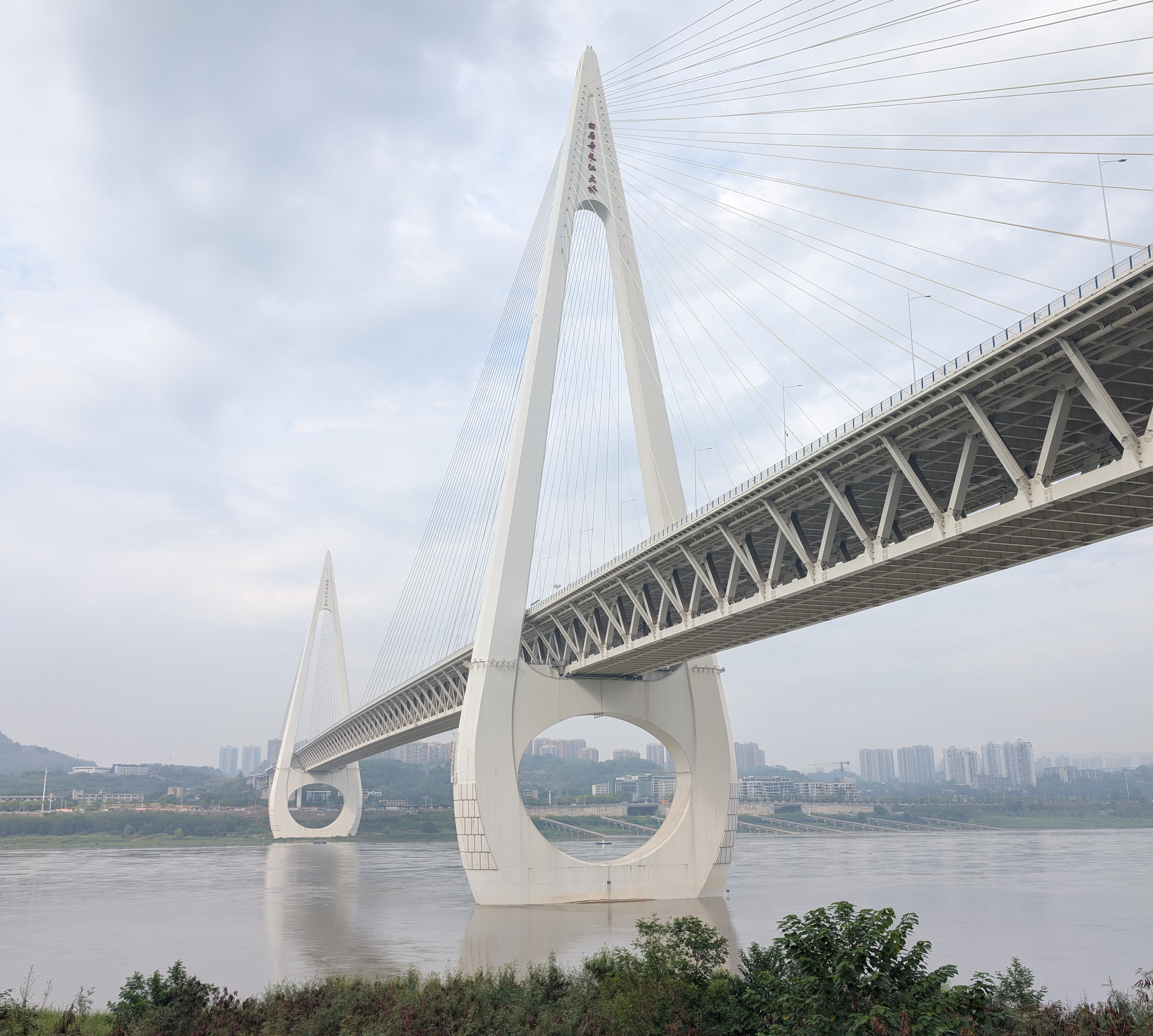
- The bridge in September 2025
- Coordinates: 29°25′54″N 106°30′25″E
- Carries: Two-way eight-lane road Line 18 (Chongqing Rail Transit)
- Crosses: Yangtze River
- Locale: Dadukou District–Banan District, Chongqing, China
- Preceded by: Yudong Yangtze River Bridge
- Followed by: Masangxi Bridge

Characteristics
- Design: Cable-stayed bridge
- Material: Steel, concrete
- Total length: 1.789 km (1.112 mi)
- Width: 38 m (125 ft)
- Height: 236 m (774 ft)
- Longest span: 660 m (2,170 ft)

History
- Construction start: 4 January 2016
- Opened: 24 January 2022

Location
- Interactive map of Baijusi Yangtze River Bridge

The Baijusi Yangtze River Bridge (Chinese: 白居寺长江大桥) is a bridge over the Yangtze River between Dadukou District and Banan District, Chongqing, China. It was opened to traffic on 24 January 2022.

== See also ==
- Bridges and tunnels across the Yangtze River
- List of bridges in China
- List of longest cable-stayed bridge spans
- List of tallest bridges
