= Second Wuhu Yangtze River Bridge =

Cable-stayed bridge, China

Second Wuhu Yangtze River Bridge 芜湖长江二桥
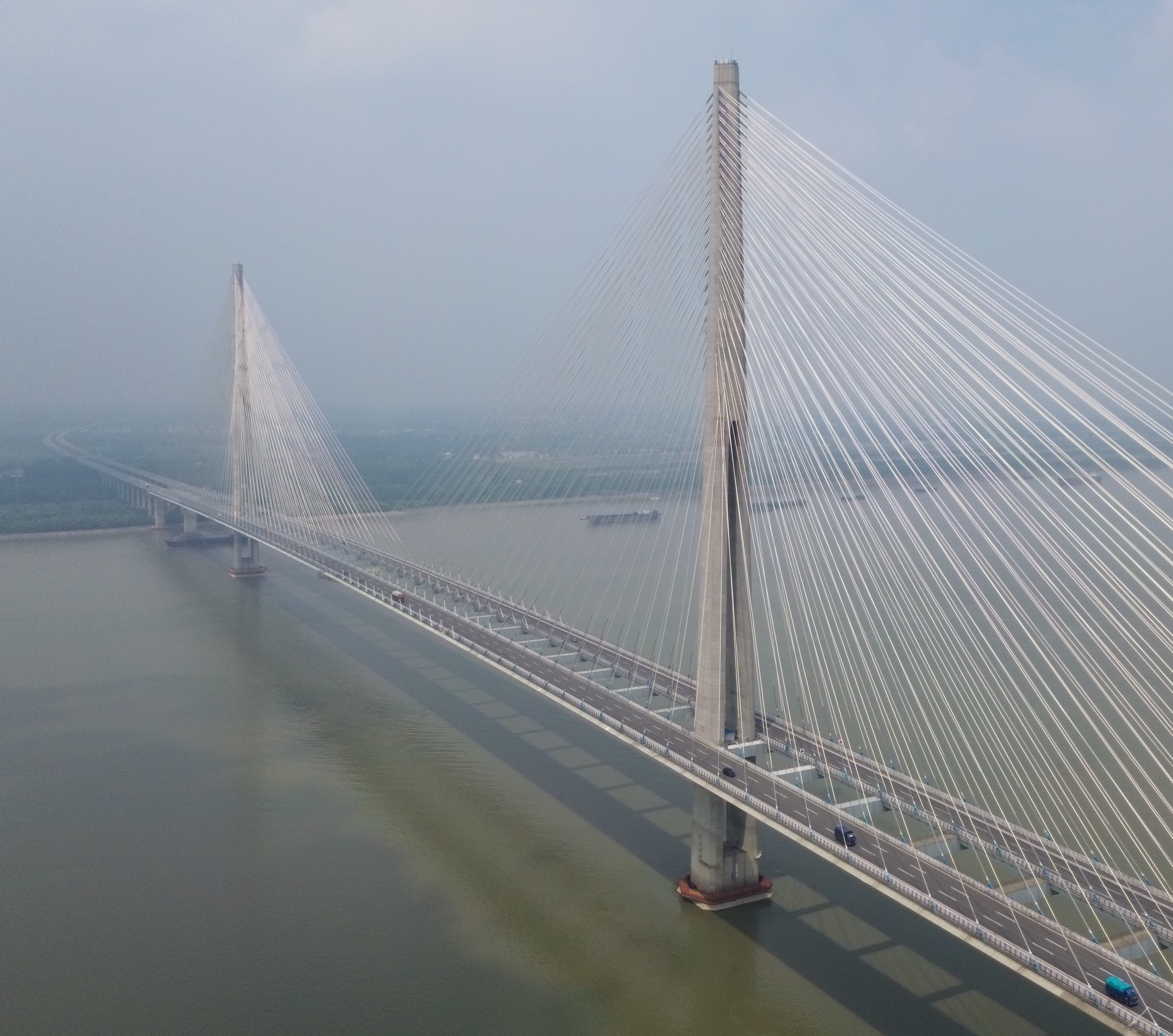
- Coordinates: 31°14′06″N 118°07′45″E
- Carries: Anhui S11
- Crosses: Yangtze River
- Locale: Wuhu, Anhui, China

Characteristics
- Design: Cable-stayed
- Material: Steel, concrete
- Width: 53 m (174 ft)
- Height: 262.5 m (861 ft)
- Longest span: 806 m (2,644 ft)

History
- Construction start: 28 June 2013
- Inaugurated: 30 December 2017

Location
- Interactive map of Second Wuhu Yangtze River Bridge

The Second Wuhu Yangtze River Bridge (Chinese: 芜湖长江二桥) is a cable-stayed bridge over the Yangtze river in Wuhu, Anhui province.

When it opened, it is one of the longest cable-stayed bridge with a 806-metre (2,644 ft) main spans.

== See also ==
- Bridges and tunnels across the Yangtze River
- List of bridges in China
- List of longest cable-stayed bridge spans
- List of tallest bridges in the world
