= Chizhou Yangtze River Bridge =

Cable-stayed bridge, China

Chizhou Yangtze River Bridge 池州长江大桥
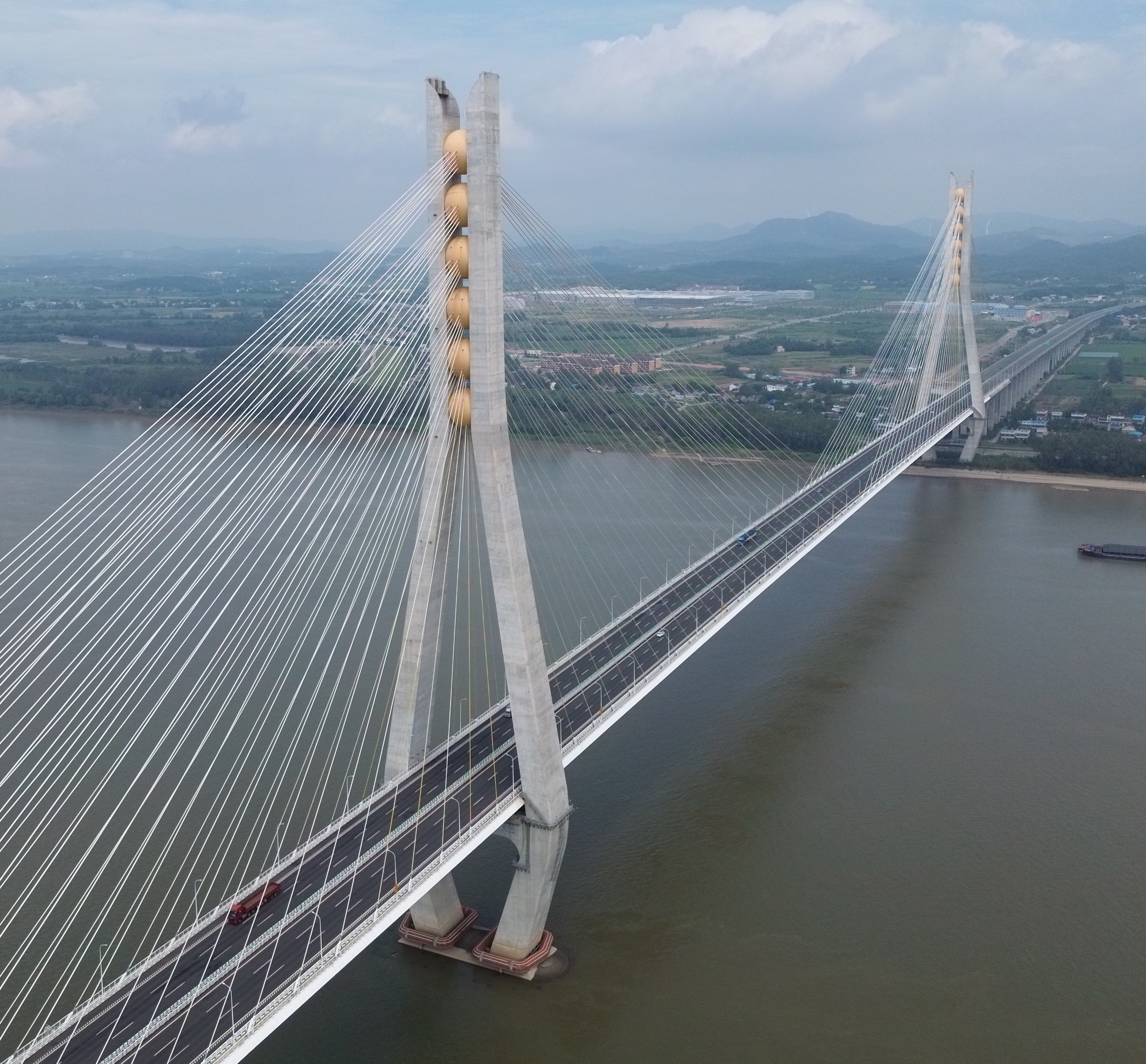
- Coordinates: 30°41′51″N 117°20′44″E
- Carries: G0321 Dezhou–Shangrao Expressway
- Crosses: Yangtze River
- Locale: Chizhou–Tongling, Anhui, China

Characteristics
- Design: Cable-stayed
- Material: Steel, concrete
- Width: 36.5 m (120 ft)
- Height: 237 m (778 ft) (north tower); 243 m (797 ft) (south tower)
- Longest span: 828 m (2,717 ft)

History
- Construction start: 30 December 2014
- Inaugurated: 31 August 2019

Location
- Interactive map of Chizhou Yangtze River Bridge

The Chizhou Yangtze River Bridge (Chinese: 池州长江大桥) is a cable-stayed bridge between Chizhou and Tongling, Anhui province.

When it opened, it is one of the longest cable-stayed bridge with a 828-metre (2,717 ft) main spans.

== See also ==
- Bridges and tunnels across the Yangtze River
- List of bridges in China
- List of longest cable-stayed bridge spans
- List of tallest bridges in the world
