= Chibi Yangtze River Bridge =

Cable-stayed bridge, China

Chibi Yangtze River Bridge 赤壁长江大桥
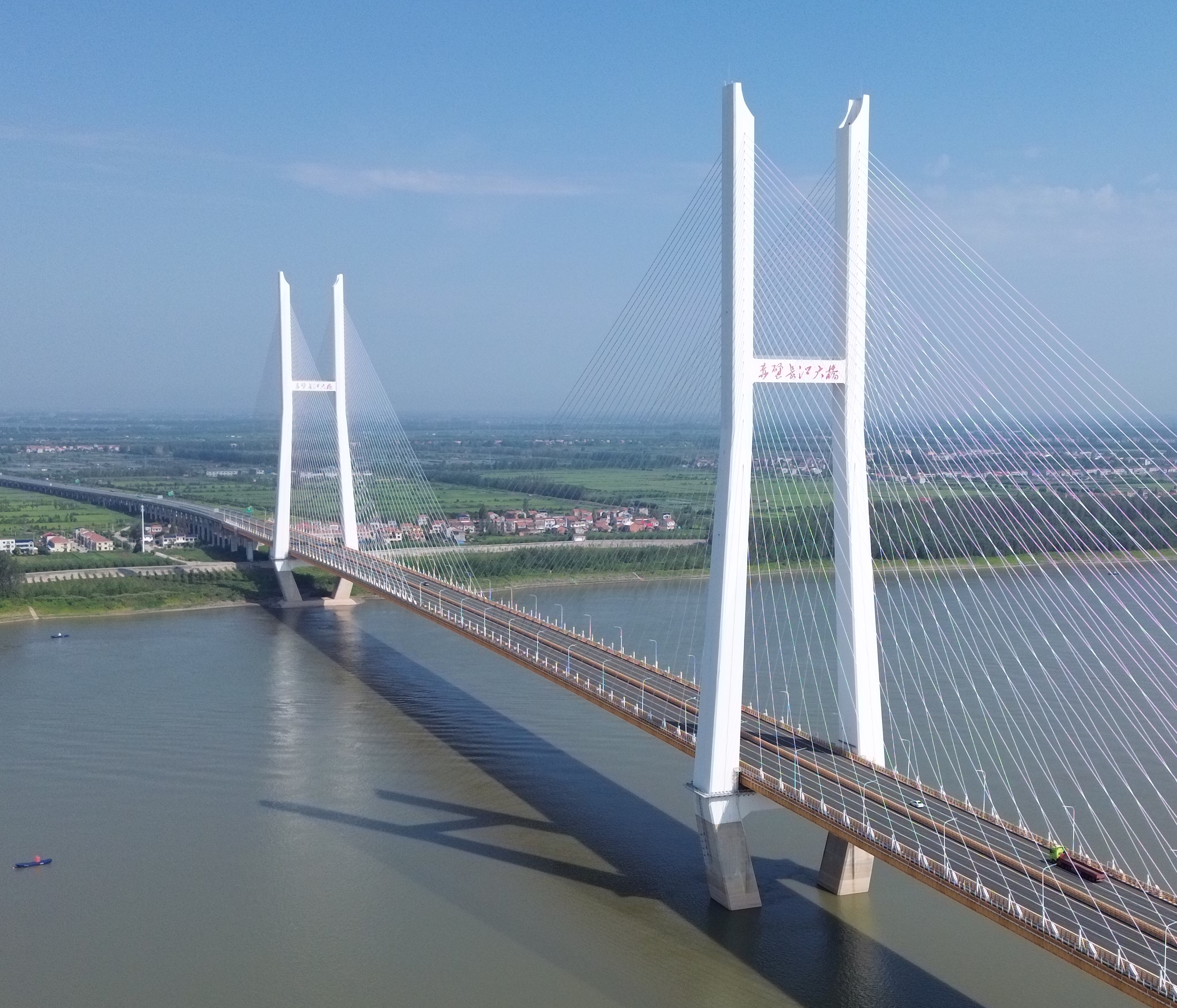
- Coordinates: 29°51′31″N 113°34′14″E
- Crosses: Yangtze River
- Locale: Chibi–Honghu, Hubei, China

Characteristics
- Design: Cable-stayed
- Material: Steel, concrete
- Width: 36.5 m (120 ft)
- Height: 217.3 m (713 ft) (north tower); 223 m (732 ft) (south tower)
- Longest span: 720 m (2,362 ft)

History
- Opened: 25 September 2021

Location
- Interactive map of Chibi Yangtze River Bridge

The Chibi Yangtze River Bridge (Chinese: 赤壁长江大桥) is a cable-stayed bridge over the Yangtze river between Chibi and Honghu, Hubei province.

== See also ==
- Bridges and tunnels across the Yangtze River
- List of bridges in China
- List of longest cable-stayed bridge spans
- List of tallest bridges in the world
