= Tongling Yangtze River Road-railway Bridge =

Tongling Yangtze River Road-railway Bridge 铜陵长江公铁大桥
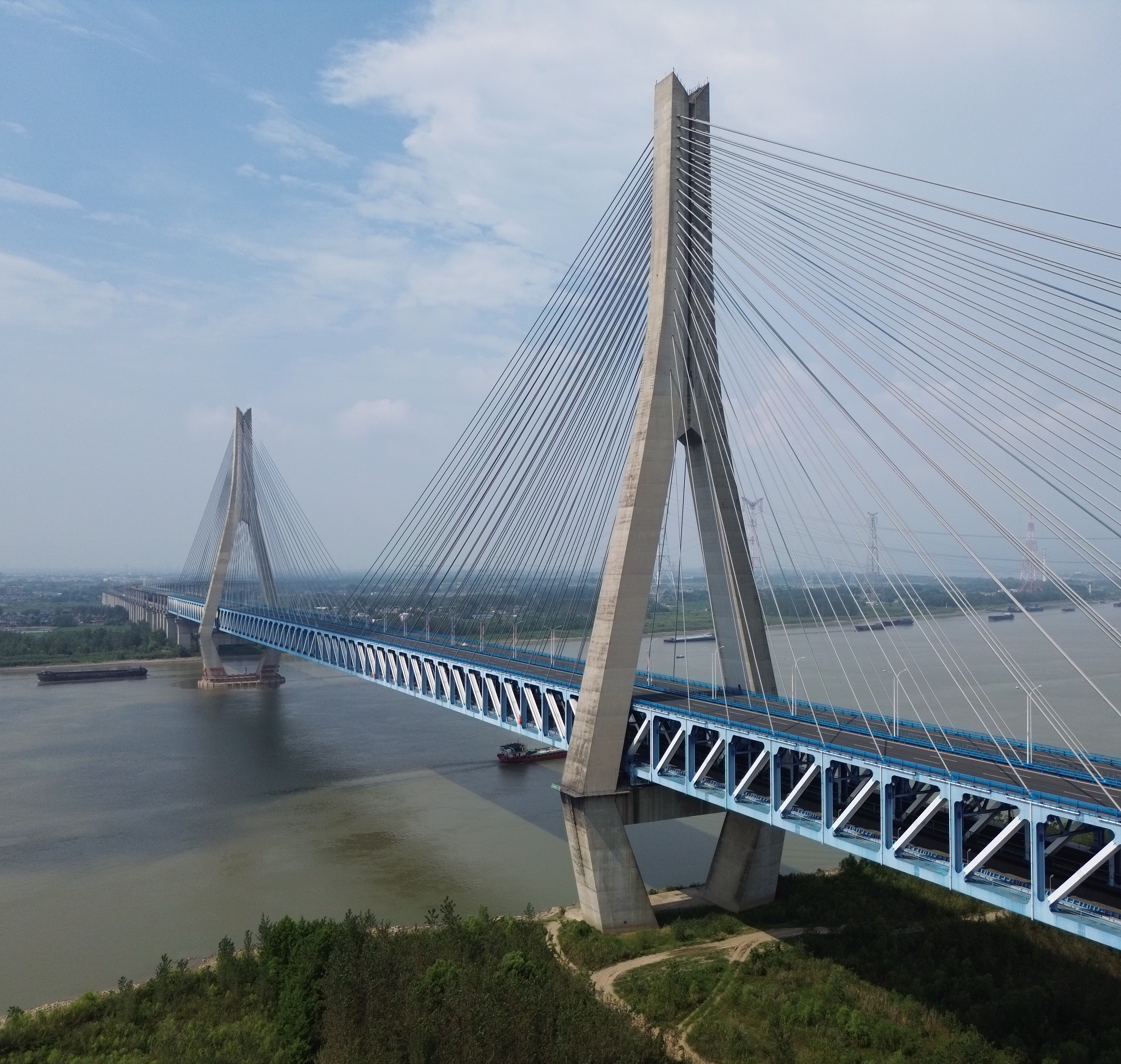
- Coordinates: 31°05′01″N 117°58′11″E
- Carries: S32 Xuanshang Expressway; Hefei–Fuzhou high-speed railway Lujiang–Tongling railway
- Crosses: Yangtze River
- Locale: Tongling, Anhui, China

Characteristics
- Design: double deck cable-stayed bridge
- Width: 34.2 m (112 ft)
- Height: 212 m (696 ft)
- Longest span: 630 m (2,067 ft)

History
- Opened: 28 June 2015

Location
- Interactive map of Tongling Yangtze River Road-railway Bridge

The Tongling Yangtze River Road-railway Bridge (Chinese: 铜陵长江公铁大桥) is a bridge across the Yangtze River located in Anhui, China.

== History ==
The bridge opened with the Hefei–Fuzhou high-speed railway on 28 June 2015.

== Design ==
The bridge has a length of 1,290 metres (4,230 feet) and a main span of 630 metres (2,070 feet). On its upper deck it carries a six-lane expressway. On its lower deck it carries the double-track Hefei–Fuzhou high-speed railway and the single-track Lujiang–Tongling railway. There is provision for the line to be upgraded to double-track in the future.

== See also ==
- Bridges and tunnels across the Yangtze River
- List of bridges in China
- List of longest cable-stayed bridge spans
- List of tallest bridges
