= Jiujiang Yangtze River Expressway Bridge =

Bridge in People's Republic of China

Jiujiang Yangtze River Expressway Bridge 九江长江公路大桥
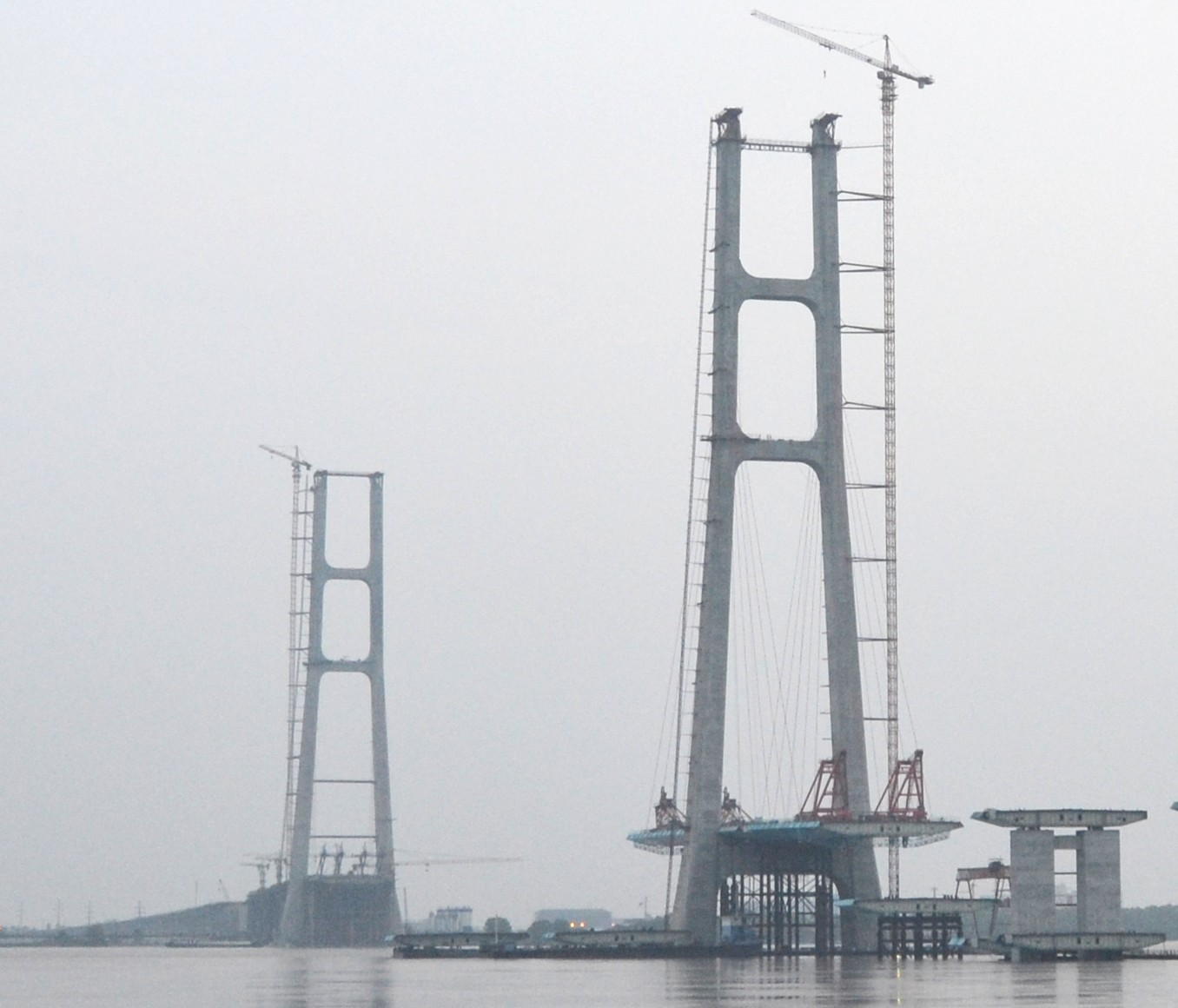
- Coordinates: 29°43′21″N 115°54′30″E
- Carries: G70 Fuzhou–Yinchuan Expressway
- Crosses: Yangtze River
- Locale: Huanggang, Hubei and Jiujiang, Jiangxi, China

Characteristics
- Design: Cable-stayed
- Total length: 1,405 m (4,610 ft) (total span); 8,462 m (27,762 ft) (total bridge length including approaches)
- Height: 244.3 m (802 ft)
- Longest span: 818 m (2,684 ft)

History
- Construction start: September 27, 2009
- Opened: October 28, 2013

Location
- Interactive map of Jiujiang Yangtze River Expressway Bridge

The Jiujiang Yangtze River Expressway Bridge (Chinese: 九江长江公路大桥), also known as the Second Jiujiang Bridge, is a cable-stayed bridge over the Yangtze River between Huangmei, Huanggang, in Hubei province and Jiujiang, in Jiangxi province. The bridge carries six lanes of traffic on the G70 Fuzhou–Yinchuan Expressway and is the second Yangtze River crossing in Jiujiang. Construction of the bridge started on September 27, 2009, and the bridge was completed on October 28, 2013.

The bridge's main span of 818 m (2,684 ft) is one of the longest cable-stayed bridge spans in the world. The total length of the bridge span across the Yangtze River is 1,405 m (4,610 ft). The bridge structure is 8,462 m (27,762 ft), which consists of the main span, secondary span, northern and southern approaches. The secondary span is 1,300 m (4,300 ft). The northern approach 2,166 m (7,106 ft) consists of the Huangguang Levee Bridge, Fen Road Elevated Bridge and G105 Highway Bridge). The southern approach 3,591 m (11,781 ft) consists of the Qili Lake Bridge and the Bridge over the Jingjiu Railway.

== See also ==
- Bridges and tunnels across the Yangtze River
- List of bridges in China
- List of longest cable-stayed bridge spans
- List of tallest bridges in the world
