= Jingzhou Yangtze River Bridge =

Jingzhou Yangtze River Bridge 荆州长江大桥
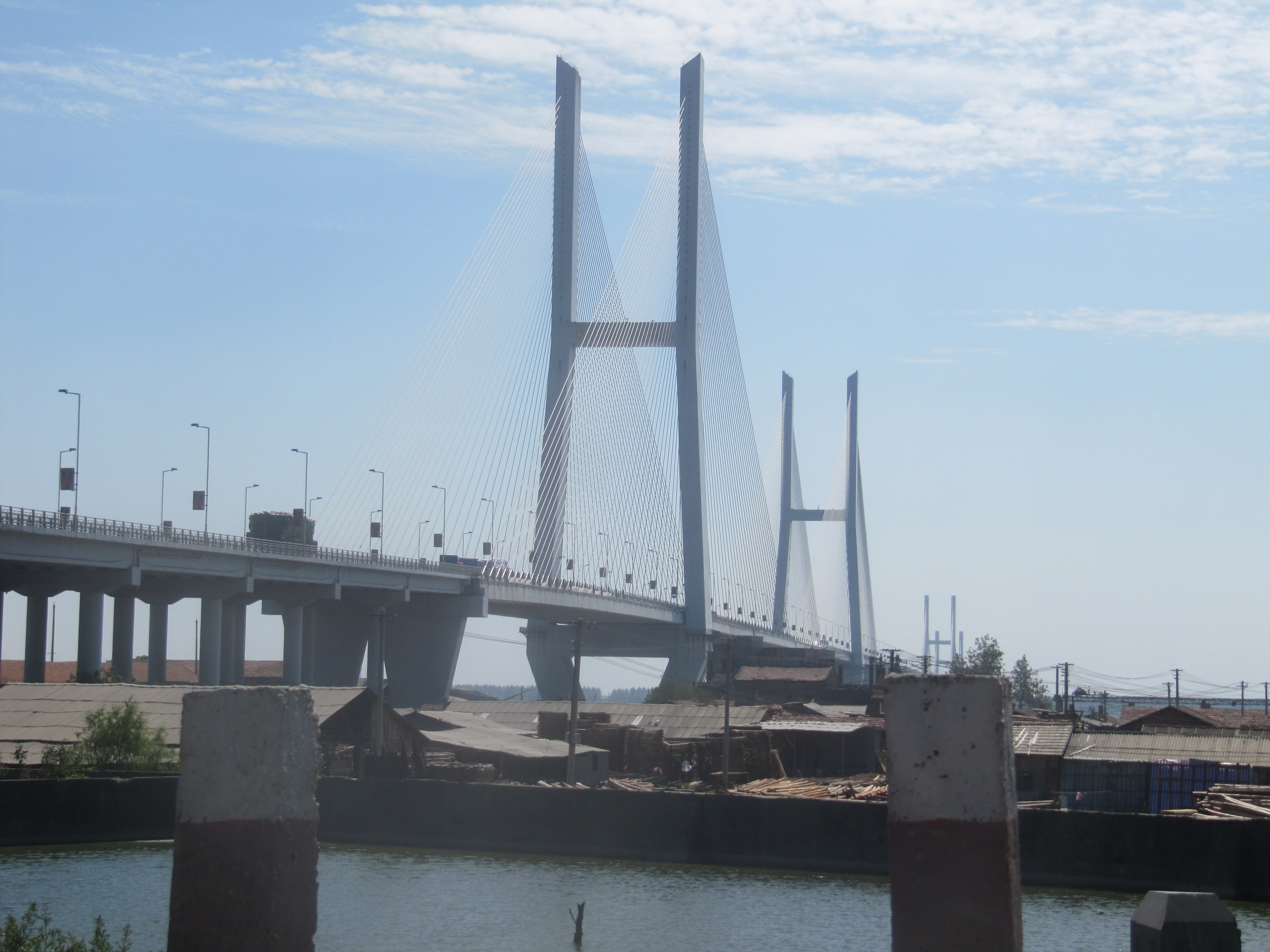
- Coordinates: 30.308837°N 112.21628°E
- Carries: G55 Erguang Expressway
- Crosses: Yangtze River
- Locale: Jingzhou, Hubei, China

Characteristics
- Design: Cable-stayed
- Total length: 4,398 metres (14,429 ft)
- Longest span: 500 metres (1,600 ft) North span

History
- Construction start: 1998
- Construction end: 2002

Location
- Interactive map of Jingzhou Yangtze River Bridge

The Jingzhou Yangtze River Bridge is a large bridge complex crossing the Yangtze River just south of the city-center of Jingzhou, Hubei. The bridge has two main cable-stayed spans (North and South) with lengths of 500 metres (1,600 ft) and 305 metres (1,001 ft) respectively. The bridge has nine box girder spans between the two large cable stayed spans, each measuring 151 metres (495 ft). The bridge carries four lanes of the G55 Erenhot–Guangzhou Expressway.

== See also ==
- Yangtze River bridges and tunnels
- List of largest cable-stayed bridges
